= Voodoo Macbeth =

Production of Macbeth adapted and directed by Orson Welles

Macbeth
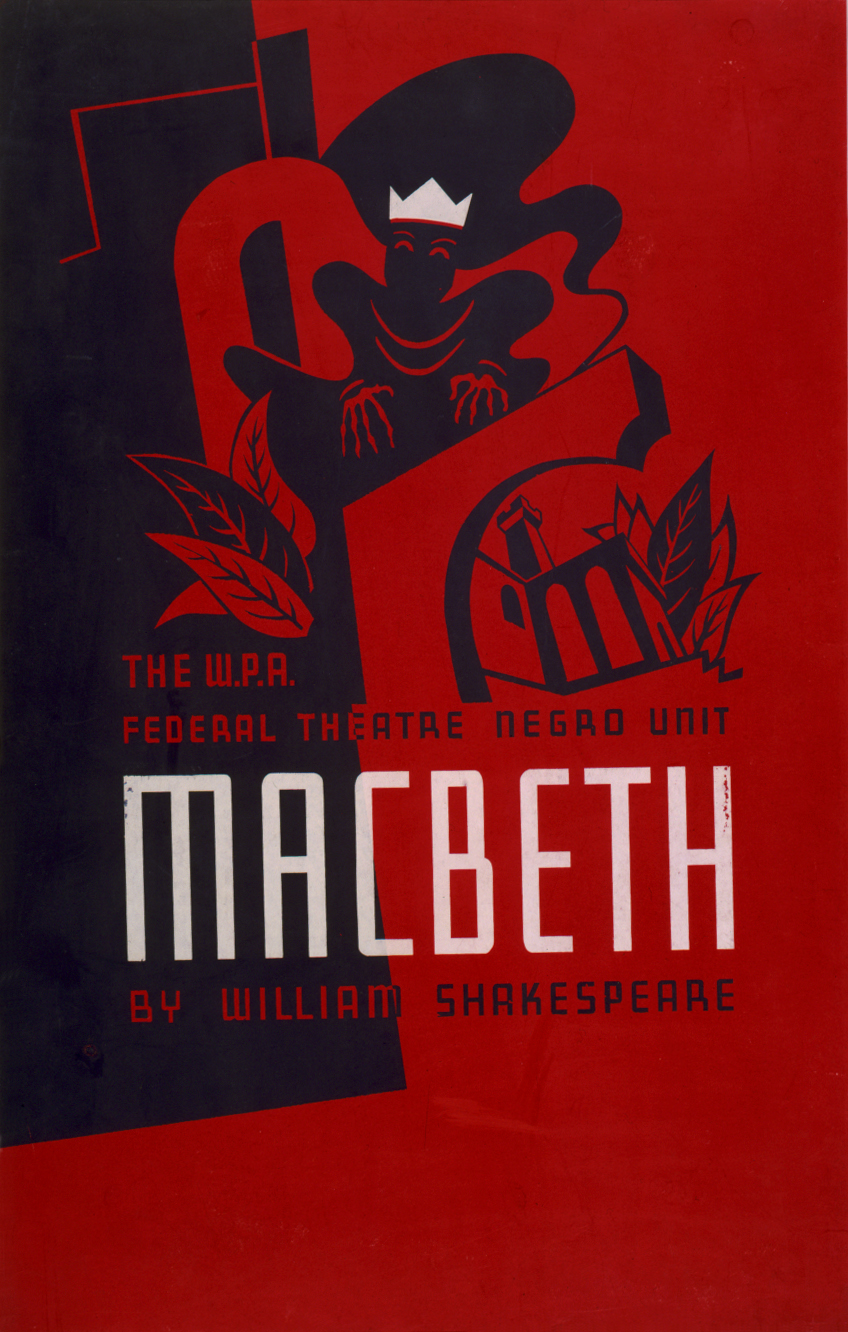
- Poster by Anthony Velonis
- Original language: English
- Written by: William Shakespeare (play); Orson Welles (adaptation)
- Genre: Tragedy

Premiere
- Date: April 14, 1936
- Place: Lafayette Theatre, Harlem, New York

The closing four minutes of the production are preserved in the 1937 film, We Work Again.

The Voodoo Macbeth is a common nickname for the Federal Theatre Project's 1936 New York production of William Shakespeare's Macbeth. Orson Welles adapted and directed the production, moved the play's setting from Scotland to a fictional Caribbean island, recruited an entirely Black cast, and earned the nickname for his production from the Haitian vodou that fulfilled the role of Scottish witchcraft. A box office sensation, the production is regarded as a landmark theatrical event for several reasons: its innovative interpretation of the play, its success in promoting African-American theatre, and its role in securing the reputation of its 20-year-old director.

== Background ==
The Works Project Administration provided economic stimulus during the Great Depression and, under its aegis as Federal Project Number One, was responsible for generating jobs in the arts for which the Federal Theatre Project was created. The Negro Theatre Unit was split into two halves, the "Contemporary Branch" to create theater on contemporary black issues, and the "Classic Branch", to perform classic drama. The aim was to provide a point of entry into the theater workforce for black writers, actors and stagehands, and to raise community pride by performing classic plays without reference to the color of the actors.

== Concept ==
Shakespeare's play is about the downfall of a usurper in medieval Scotland, who is encouraged in his actions by three witches. The central idea behind Welles's production was to perform the text straight, but to use costumes and sets that alluded to Haiti in the 19th century, specifically during the reign of the slave-turned-emperor Henri Christophe. Although the main reason for this choice was that it was an appropriate setting for an all-black cast, Welles felt that it also enhanced the play's realism: he thought the production's popularity was partly due to the fact that the idea of voodoo was more credible to a contemporary audience than was medieval witchcraft.

In many productions, the character of Hecate, the Queen of the Witches, is often cut. Instead, Welles turned the character into a pivotal figure. Performed by Eric Burroughs as a huge man with a bullwhip, Hecate presides over events as a ringmaster of magicians and often closes scenes. Hecate ends the play with the line, "The charm's wound up", repeated from Act 1. Welles's 1948 film version of Macbeth, in which Hecate does not appear, also ends with this line.

The production used a single, unchanging set of a castle in a jungle. The backdrops featured stylized palm trees and skeleton imagery.

It is not certain whether the production removed references to Scotland from the text. Welles's promptbook keeps them intact, but in the surviving film record of the production's climax, the line "Hail, King of Scotland" is truncated to "Hail, King".

== Production ==
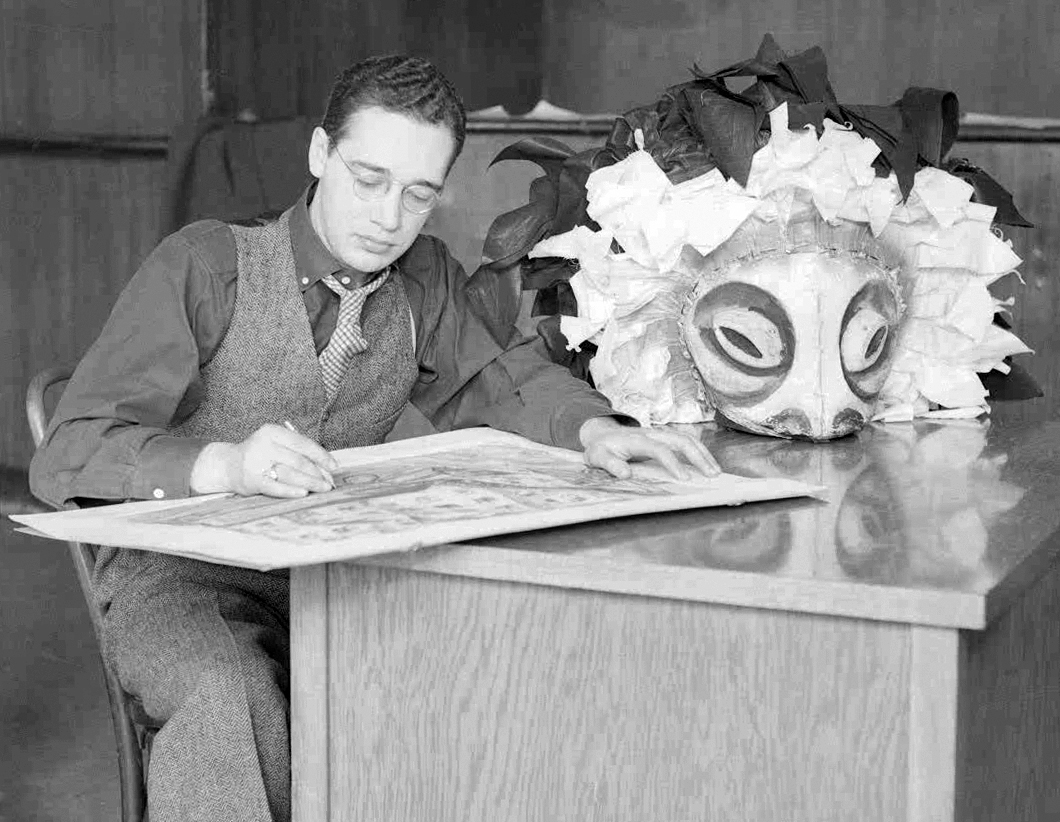
Designer Nat Karson (1908–54)

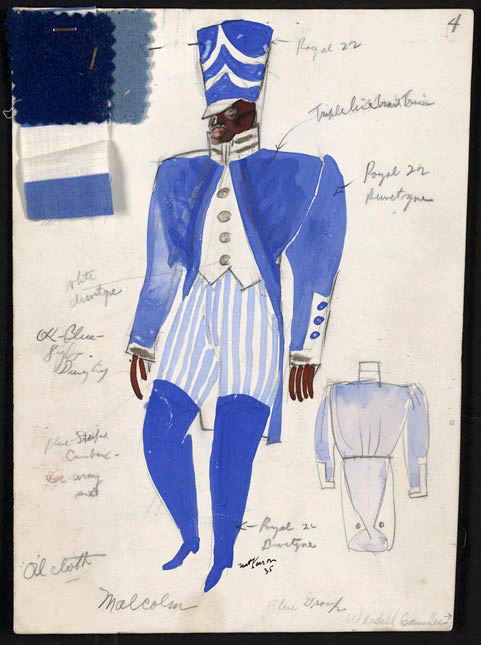
Costume drawing for Malcolm

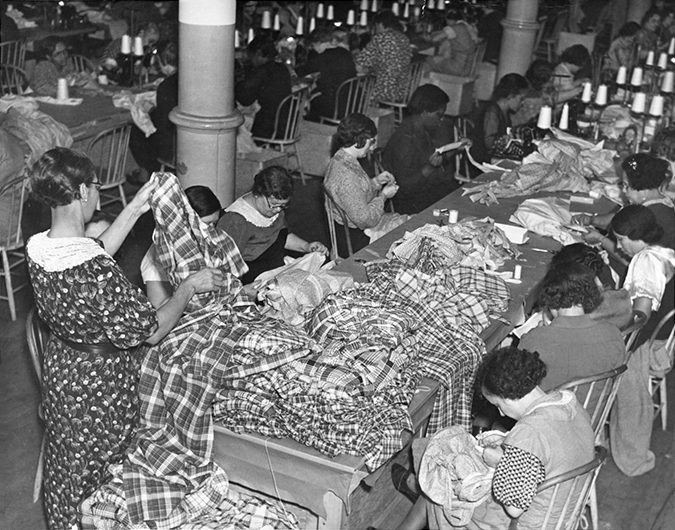
Costume construction by the Federal Theatre Workshop

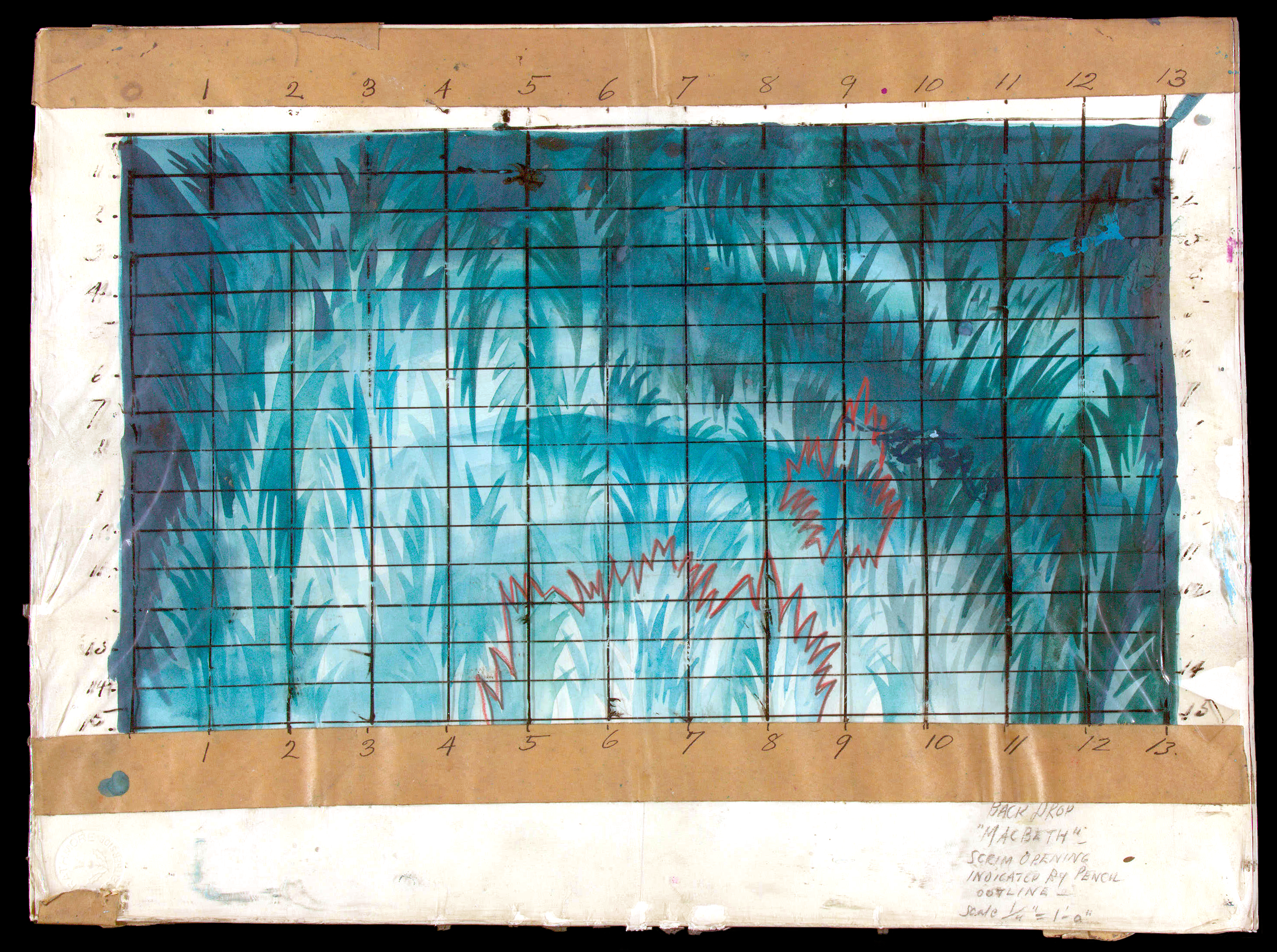
Backdrop design for the permanent set

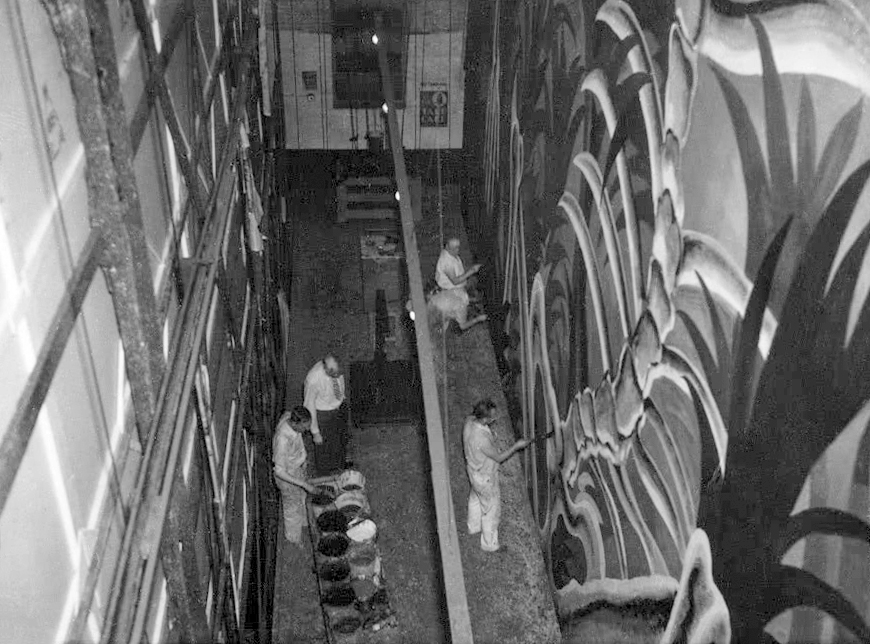
Set painting by the Federal Theatre Workshop

The Negro Theatre Unit of the Federal Theatre Project was formed in 1935 under the distinguished actress Rose McClendon. She advised national director Hallie Flanagan that the project should begin under experienced direction and selected producer John Houseman as co-director of the unit. Their partnership was never realized; it was soon apparent that McClendon was not well, and she made only a few formal appearances before she became critically ill in December 1935.

Regarding the unit's name, Houseman later wrote, "the word 'black' was taboo. 'Negro' was in official and general use though there was some ideological disagreement as to whether it should be spelled with a small or a capital N."

Houseman had established his credentials as general manager of the all-black production, Four Saints in Three Acts (1934). On the advice of composer Virgil Thomson, Houseman divided the unit into two sections between which the project members themselves could choose and could switch between from one production to another. One section was devoted to original black-themed contemporary drama. "The other," Houseman wrote, "would devote itself to the performance of classical works of which our actors would be the interpreters, without concession or reference to color."

"For this fine scheme to work," Houseman wrote, "there was one essential condition — that the quality of these 'classical' productions be exceptionally high. It would be fatal to undertake the risky and difficult business of producing Shakespeare in Harlem until I had found a director of whose creative imagination and power I was completely confident."

Houseman invited his recent collaborator, the 20-year-old Orson Welles, to join the project. Welles declined at first, since the work would cut into his lucrative radio career and he feared being put back into insolvency, but his young wife Virginia persuaded him to take the job. In the autumn of 1935, Welles called Houseman after he and Virginia had an inspiration. Welles proposed staging an all-black production of Macbeth, transposed from Scotland to a mythical island setting inspired by 19th-century Haiti and the fantasy world of The Tempest. The idea offered creative advantages in music, costumes and settings — and the ability to make the role of witchcraft credible to modern audiences by substituting Haitian voodooism. The production was universally known as the Voodoo Macbeth in advance of its presentation.

At Welles's request, Houseman stayed away from early rehearsals, leaving him able to concentrate on the first two Negro Theatre Unit productions, both from the contemporary wing. Walk Together Chillun, written and co-directed by actor Frank Wilson, was the modestly received first production presented in February 1936. The second was Rudolph Fisher's Conjur' Man Dies, a comedy-mystery starring Dooley Wilson (and directed by Joseph Losey) that was a smash hit.

In fact, since Conjur' Man Dies was playing onstage while the 150-person cast of Macbeth was rehearsing, their rehearsals had to start at midnight and run much of the night.

The settings and costumes were designed by Nat Karson. Welles and Karson researched Directoire style, uniforms of the Napoleonic era, and tropical vegetation. The sets and costumes were executed by the Federal Theatre Workshop at a cost of $2,000.

The lighting was created by Abe Feder, later regarded as a founder of lighting design profession. During production, Welles would often yell his many frustrations with the lighting design at Feder. This relationship went both ways as Fedar believed that Welles was too young and ignorant of the practicalities of theatre; he continued to hold this opinion when interviewed decades later.

In addition to Feder, Welles initially had a similarly contentious relationship with much of the cast. During a rehearsal where Welles was becoming increasingly more frustrated and aggressive with his cast, Edna Thomas, who played Lady Macbeth, pushed back against a specific insult given by Welles toward the cast, she said "Orson, don't do that; those people will take your head off." Thomas believed that this interaction had an impact on Welles because after it, Welles treated the cast much more kindly. Even though Welles had a tense start with the show's black cast and crew, he eventually won them over with his energy and warmth, and pleased everyone by cramming the rehearsal space with food and drink. Black cast and crew members interviewed decades later said that Houseman and Welles had their full confidence.

"I never would have amounted to anything in the theatre if it hadn't been for Orson Welles," Canada Lee recalled. "The way I looked at acting, it was interesting and it was certainly better than going hungry. But I didn't have a serious approach to it until … I bumped into Orson Welles. He was putting on a Federal Theatre production of Macbeth with Negro players and, somehow, I won the part of Banquo. He rehearsed us for six solid months, but when the play finally went on before an audience, it was right — and it was a wonderful sensation, knowing it was right. Suddenly, the theatre became important to me. I had a respect for it, for what it could say. I had the ambition — I caught it from Orson Welles — to work like mad and be a convincing actor."

=== Run ===
Opening night was originally scheduled to open on April 9, 1936, but was postponed; the production opened April 14, 1936, at the Lafayette Theatre in Harlem. The following week, a free performance offered on April 20 drew 3,000 more people than could be seated.

"By all odds my great success in my life was that play," Welles told BBC interviewer Leslie Megahey in 1982. "Because the opening night there were five blocks in which all traffic was stopped. You couldn't get near the theater in Harlem. Everybody who was anybody in the black or white world was there. And when the play ended there were so many curtain calls that finally they left the curtain open, and the audience came up on the stage to congratulate the actors. And that was, that was magical."

Macbeth played for ten sold-out weeks at the Lafayette Theatre (April 14–June 20, 1936). The production then moved to the Adelphi Theatre (July 6–18). On July 15, Jack Carter completed only the first act, and the performance was completed by understudy Thomas Anderson. Beginning July 16 Maurice Ellis played the role of Macbeth, with Charles Collins succeeding Ellis in the role of Macduff.

The production then toured WPA venues throughout the country, beginning with engagements in Bridgeport (July 21–25) and Hartford, Connecticut (July 28–August 1). Macbeth was performed in Dallas beginning August 6, and the production was featured at the Texas Centennial Exposition August 13–23. Performances were presented in the new bandshell and 5,000-seat open-air amphitheatre, where integrated seating was a unique experience for Dallas theatergoers. The production was one of the most talked-about features of the exposition and drew large, enthusiastic audiences. For many it was their first opportunity to see a professional dramatic performance by African American actors.

Welles was sent to join the company during the play's run in Indianapolis (August 25–29), to soothe inter-company quarrels that threatened the production after racial tensions escalated during the segment of the tour through the segregated South. Incognito, he performed the role of Macbeth at one performance there, when Ellis became ill. The 4,000-mile tour continued to Chicago, (September 1–13) Detroit, and Cleveland, finishing in Syracuse, New York (September 23–25).

After the company's return to New York, the final performances of Macbeth were presented October 6–17 at the Majestic Theatre in Brooklyn. The production was invited to London by impresario Charles B. Cochran, but Welles declined because he was trying to secure his career in New York.

The closing four minutes of the production are preserved in a rare 1937 film, We Work Again, a WPA documentary that is in the public domain and can be viewed online. Maurice Ellis and Charles Collins appear as Macbeth and Macduff, indicating that the filming took place after July 16, 1936.

Houseman produced only one more play for the Federal Theatre Project's Negro Theatre Unit. After ten months as the project's director he assured Hallie Flanagan that the unit was viable and should be directed by a triumvirate comprising West Indian intellectual Harry Edward, Carlton Moss and Gus Smith. He and Welles were authorized to create a new Classical Theatre unit that became known as Federal Theatre Project 891. Its first production, Horse Eats Hat, opened in September 1936.

== Cast ==
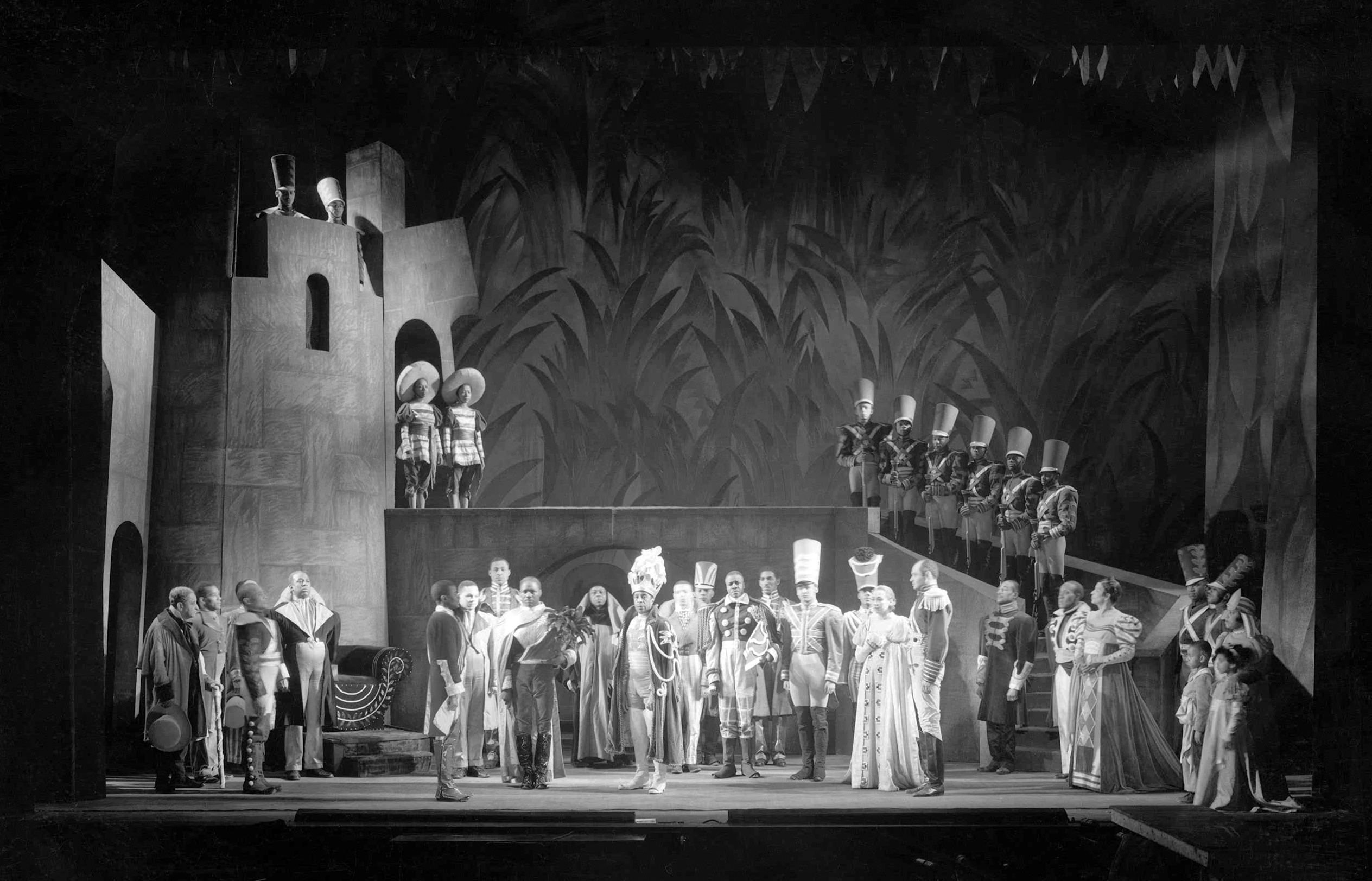
King Duncan arrives at Macbeth's palace

The cast of Macbeth numbered 150 people, but only four were professional actors: Jack Carter, Edna Thomas, Canada Lee, and Eric Burroughs.

Juano Hernandez was first cast as Macbeth, but he left the production after just three rehearsals to play the lead in an NBC radio series. Jack Carter, who played Crown in the original stage production of Porgy, was chosen for the role. Rose McClendon was to have portrayed Lady Macbeth, but when she became critically ill, Edna Thomas inherited the role. Both Carter and Thomas were light-skinned and wore dark makeup in order to avoid looking different from the rest of the cast. Thomas played Lady Macbeth as a mother figure to Macbeth.

Carter was a former criminal and an alcoholic, but Welles cast him despite being warned of his habit of disappearing for weeks on binges. Carter understood the importance of the production to his career and kept his drinking under control during the Harlem run. Welles expended a great deal of time on helping Carter channel his adrenalin into his performance. The two men bonded and hit the nightspots of Harlem together after rehearsals. His behavior became so troublesome during the Broadway run that he was replaced by Maurice Ellis, who had held the role of Macduff.

Canada Lee played Banquo. Lee met Welles prior to his involvement with the production, at a performance of Stevedore. The audience had been whipped into a frenzied shouting match, and Lee rescued Welles from being attacked by another audience member wielding a knife.

The role of Hecate, which Welles changed from the witch queen of the original to that of a male Voodoo priest, was played by Eric Burroughs, trained at London's Royal Academy of Dramatic Art. The New York Times noted that Burroughs' concluding line, "The charm’s wound up!" at the fall of the closing curtain prompted a 15-minute frenzy of cheering throughout the 1200-seat Lafayette Theatre.

Despite the fact that few professional African-American actors were available and many of the cast members had never acted in Shakespeare before, Welles believed that they showed a better understanding of the rhythm of the iambic pentameter than many professionals.

Welles also hired African drummers and dancers, led by Sierra Leonean drummer and choreographer Asadata Dafora. Dancer Abdul Assen, a member of Dafora's Shogola Aloba dance troupe who is credited only as "Abdul" on the program, was widely praised by reviewers in his role as the Witch Doctor. Dafora and Assen's presentation of voodoo practices and musical accompaniment of the witches' speeches with drumbeats were popular with audiences, critics, and with Welles himself. The involvement of Assen, Dafora, and diasporic African musical and dance tradition added a powerful feeling of authenticity to the Haitian setting that became part of the folklore surrounding the production.

=== Cast list ===
The cast and crew of Macbeth are credited in the original production notebook and in The Theatre of Orson Welles by Richard France.

- Duncan (The King) … Service Bell
- Malcolm (Son to the King) … Wardell Saunders
- Macduff … Maurice Ellis
- Banquo … Canada Lee
- Macbeth … Jack Carter
- Ross … Frank David
- Lennox … Thomas Anderson
- Siward … Archie Savage
- First Murderer … George Nixon
- Second Murderer … Kenneth Renwick
- The Doctor … Laurence Chenault
- The Priest … Al Watts
- First Messenger … Philandre Thomas
- Second Messenger … Herbert Glynn
- The Porter … J. Lewis Johnson
- Seyton … Larrie Lauria
- A Lord … Charles Collins
- First Captain … Lisle Grenidge
- Second Captain … Ollie Simmons
- First Chamberlain … William Cumberbatch
- Second Chamberlain … Benny Tattnall
- First Court Attendant … Chauncey Worrell
- Second Court Attendant … George Thomas
- First Page Boy … Sarah Turner
- Second Page Boy … Beryle Banfield
- Lady Macduff … Marie Young
- Lady Macbeth … Edna Thomas
- The Duchess … Alma Dickson
- The Nurse … Virginia Girvin
- Young Macduff … Bertram Holmes
- Daughter to Macduff … Wanda Macy
- Fleance … Carl Crawford
- Hecate … Eric Burroughs
- First Witch … Wilhelmina Williams
- Second Witch … Josephine Williams
- Third Witch … Zola King
- Witch Doctor … Abdul
- Court Ladies — Helen Carter, Carolyn Crosby, Eveyln Davis, Ethel Drayton, Helen Brown, Aurelia Lawson, Margaret Howard, Olive Wannamake, Evelyn Skipworth, Aslean Lynch
- Court Gentlemen — Herbert Glynn, Jose Miralda, Jimmy Wright, Otis Morse, Merritt Smith, Walter Brogsdale, Harry George Grant
- Soldiers — Benny Tattnall, Herman Patton, Ernest Brown, Ivan Lewis, Richard Ming, George Spelvin, Albert Patrick, Chauncey Worrell, Albert McCoy, William Clayton Jr., Allen Williams, William Cumberbatch, Henry J. Williams, Amos Laing, Louis Gilbert, Theodore Howard, Leonardo Barros, Ollie Simmons, Ernest Brown, Merritt Smith, Harry George Grant, Herbert Glynn, Jimmy Wright, George Thomas, Clifford Davis, Frederick Gibson, Emanuel Middleton, Thomas Dixon
- Witch Women — Juanita Baker, Beryle Banfield, Sybil Moore, Nancy Hunt, Jacqueline Ghant Martin, Fannie Suber, Ethel Millner, Dorothy Jones, Mildred Taylor, Hilda French, Rosetta LeNoire
- Witch Men — Archie Savage, Charles Hill, Leonardo Barros, Howard Taylor, Amos Laing, Allen Williams, Ollie Simmons, Theodore Howard
- Cripples — Clyde Gooden, Clarence Potter, Milton Lacey, Hudson Prince, Theodore Howard, Cecil McNair
- Voodoo Women — Lena Halsey, Jean Cutler, Effie McDowell, Irene Ellington, Marguerite Perry, Essie Frierson, Ella Emanuel, Ethel Drayton, Evelyn Davis
- Voodoo Men — Ernest Brown, Howard Taylor, Henry J. Williams, Louis Gilbert, William Clayton Jr., Albert McCoy, Merritt Smith, Richard Ming, Halle Howard
- Drummers — James Cabon, James Martha, Jay Daniel, Moses Myers, McLean Hughes

== Reception ==
Before the production opened, the Harlem Communists tried to agitate the community against the project, wrongly believing that Welles had cast black actors in order to create a comic or burlesque version of Shakespeare. The theatre was picketed throughout rehearsals. One man attempted to slash Welles's face with a razor, but Canada Lee, a former boxer, stopped him.

According to Welles, the anger was suddenly replaced "for no reason at all" by widespread excitement and pride in the community as the opening night approached. The "Voodoo Macbeth" defied all expectations, becoming a box office sensation. Seventh Avenue had to be closed for 10 blocks on either side of the theatre on opening night.

Most reviewers, including those from The New York Times and the New York Daily News, loved the production, praising its energy and excitement. However, Carter was criticized for poor verse delivery, and for seeming more interested in displaying his physique than acting. One reviewer, Percy Hammond of the Herald Tribune, was negative about the entire cast, accusing the actors of being inaudible and timid. In response, one of the African drummers created a voodoo doll of Hammond, stuck pins in it, and encouraged Welles to take responsibility for any torments Hammond suffered as a result. Welles says he found this amusing, until Hammond died shortly afterward.

== Gallery ==
=== Opening night ===
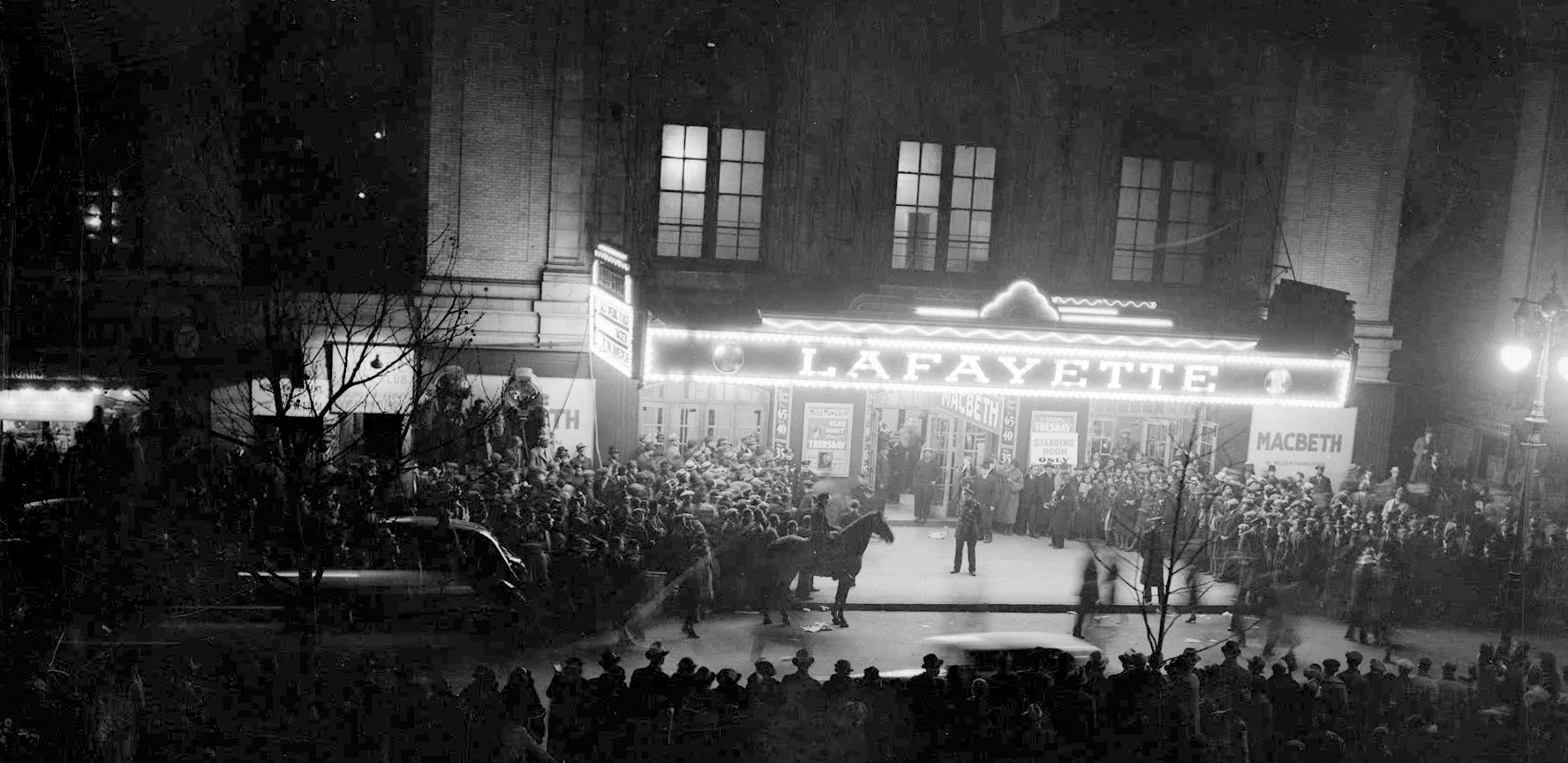
Opening night at the Lafayette Theatre (April 14, 1936)

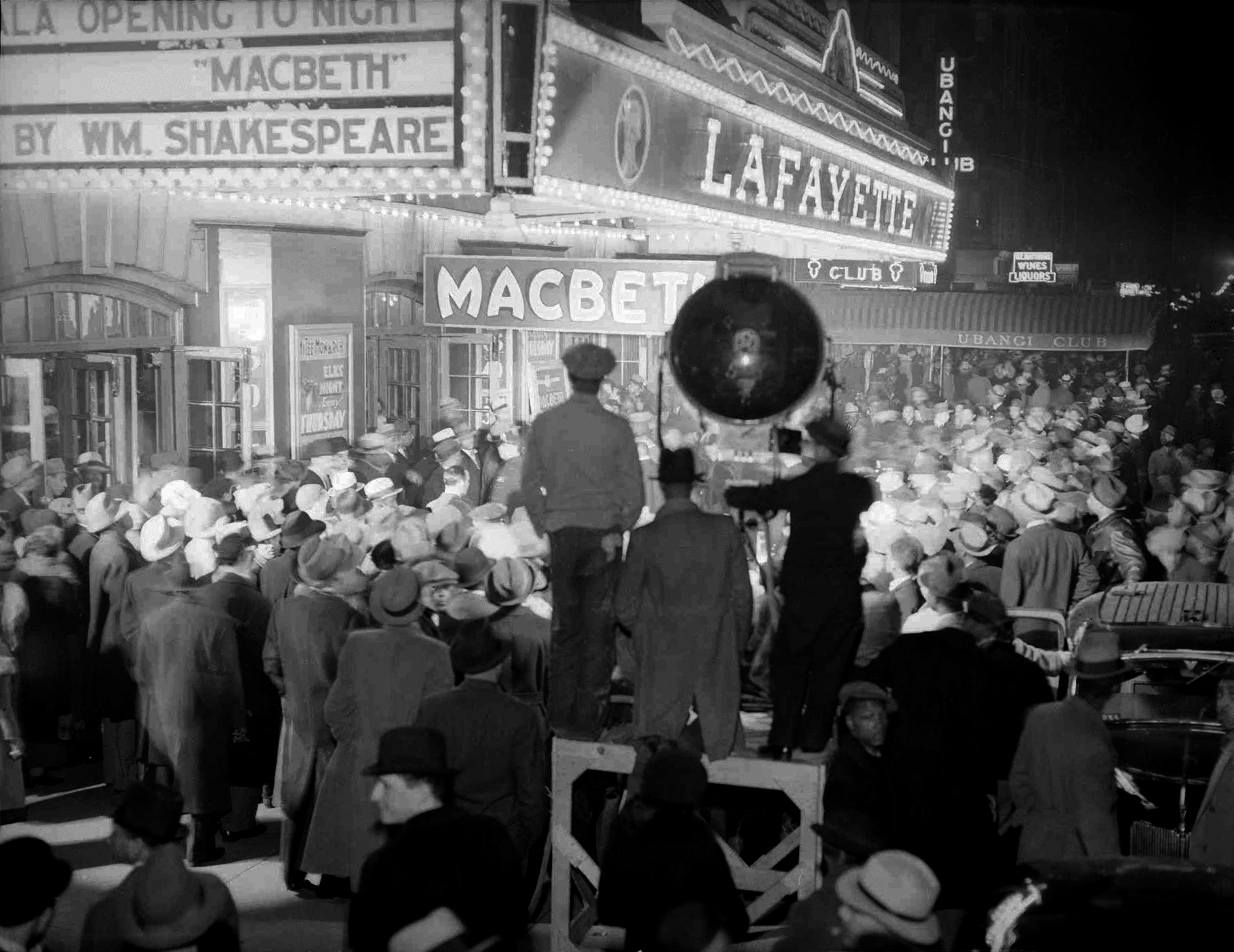
Opening night

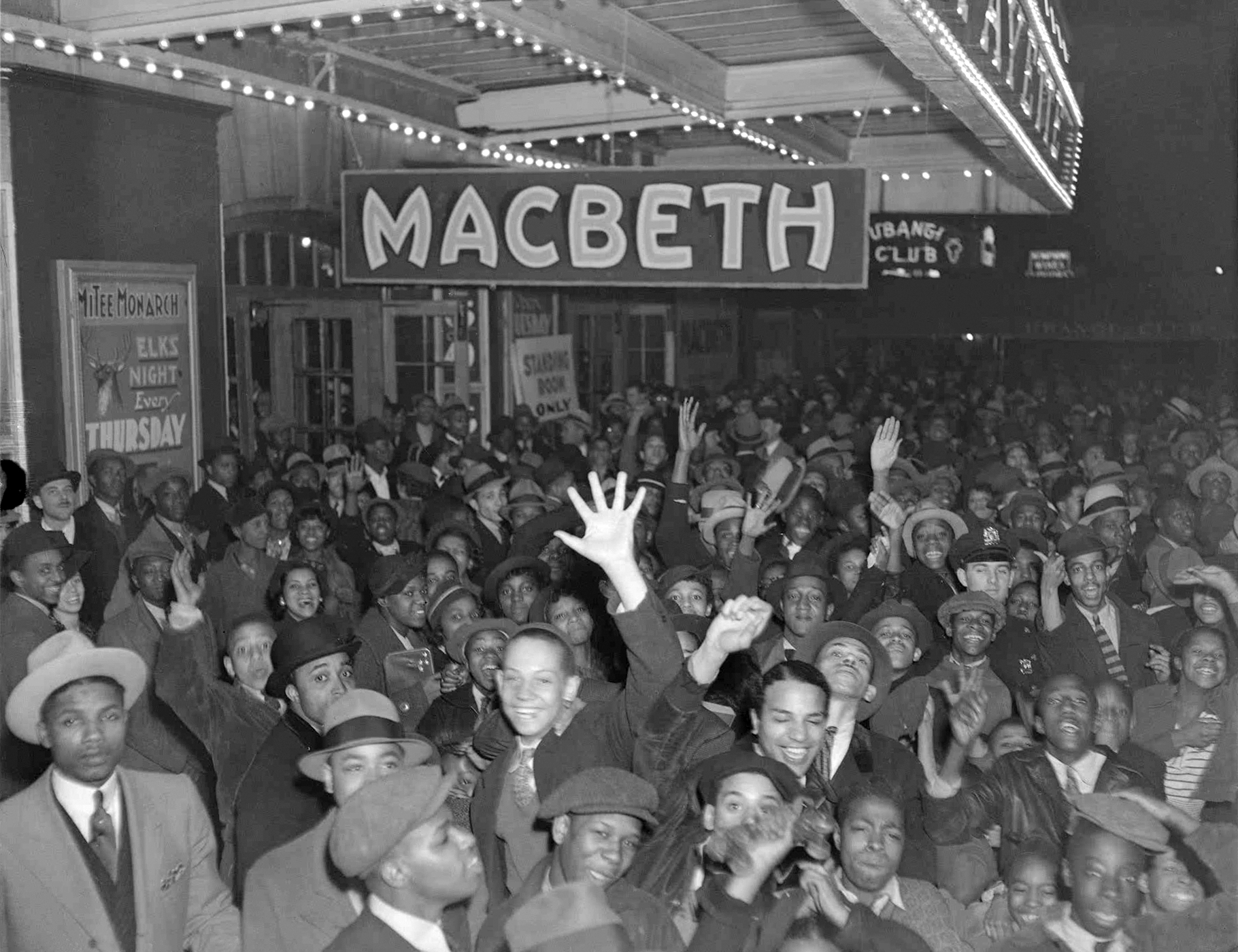
Opening night

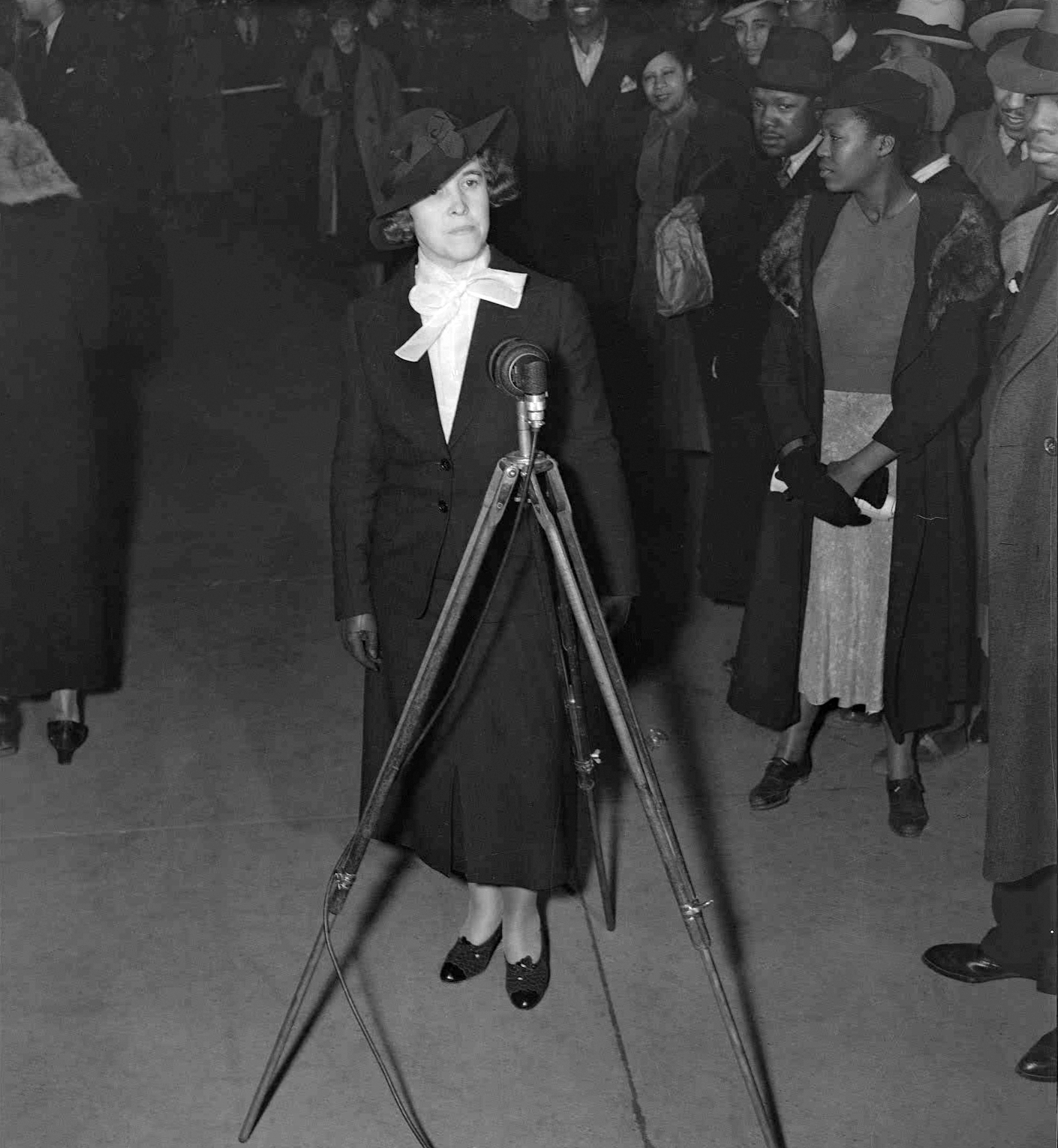
Hallie Flanagan, national director of the Federal Theatre Project

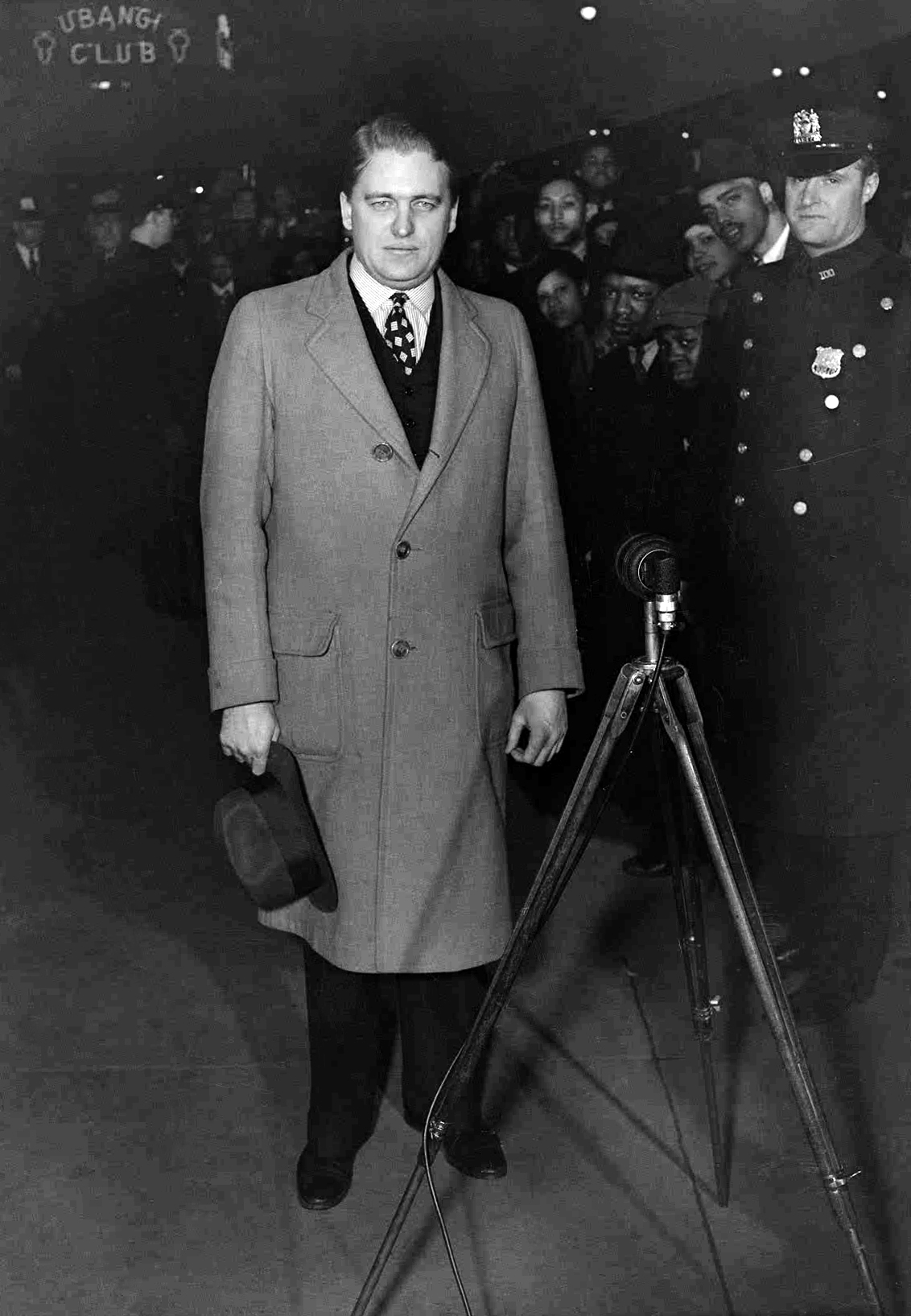
Philip W. Barber, FTP director for New York City

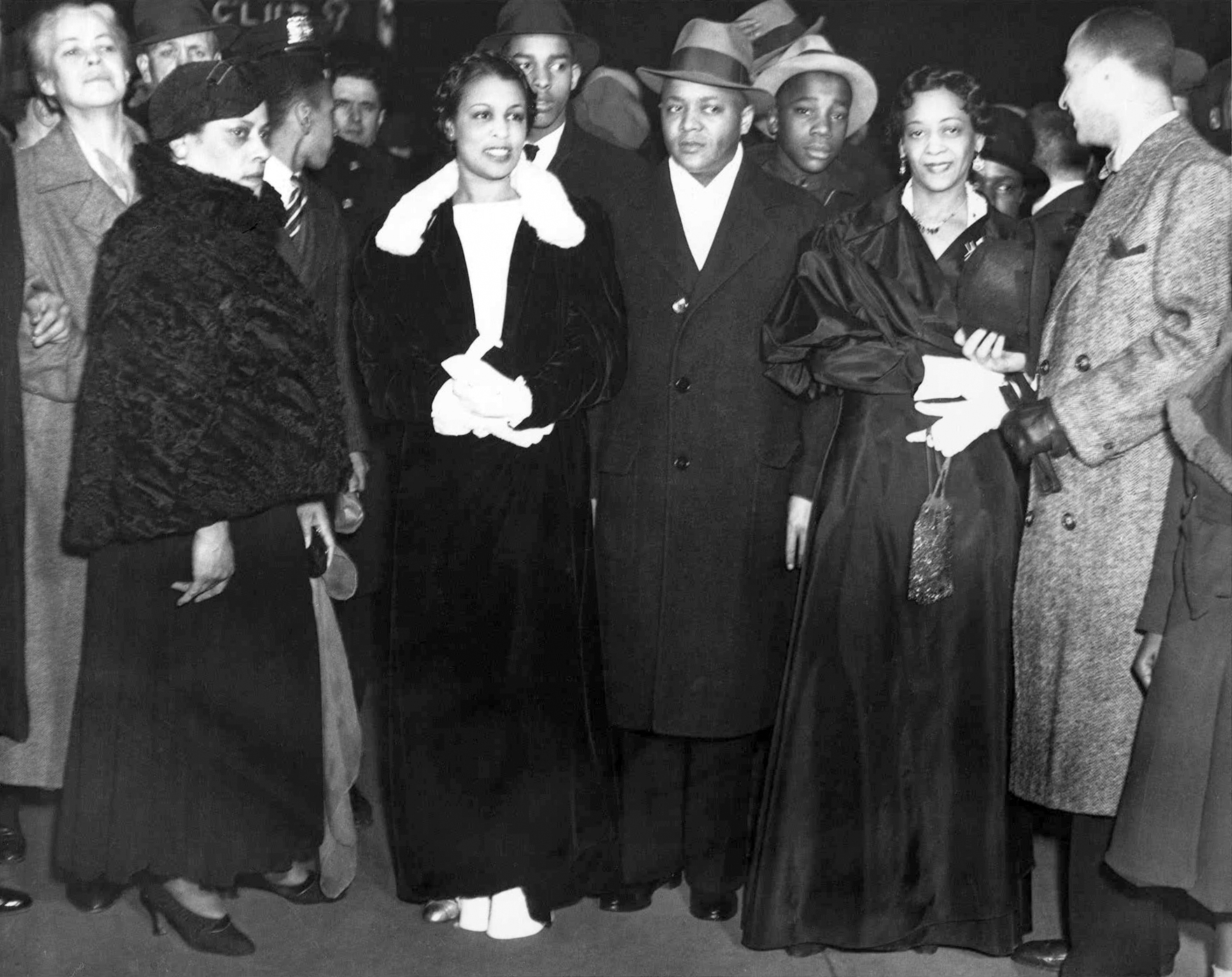
Rose McClendon, co-director of the Negro Theatre Unit, second from right

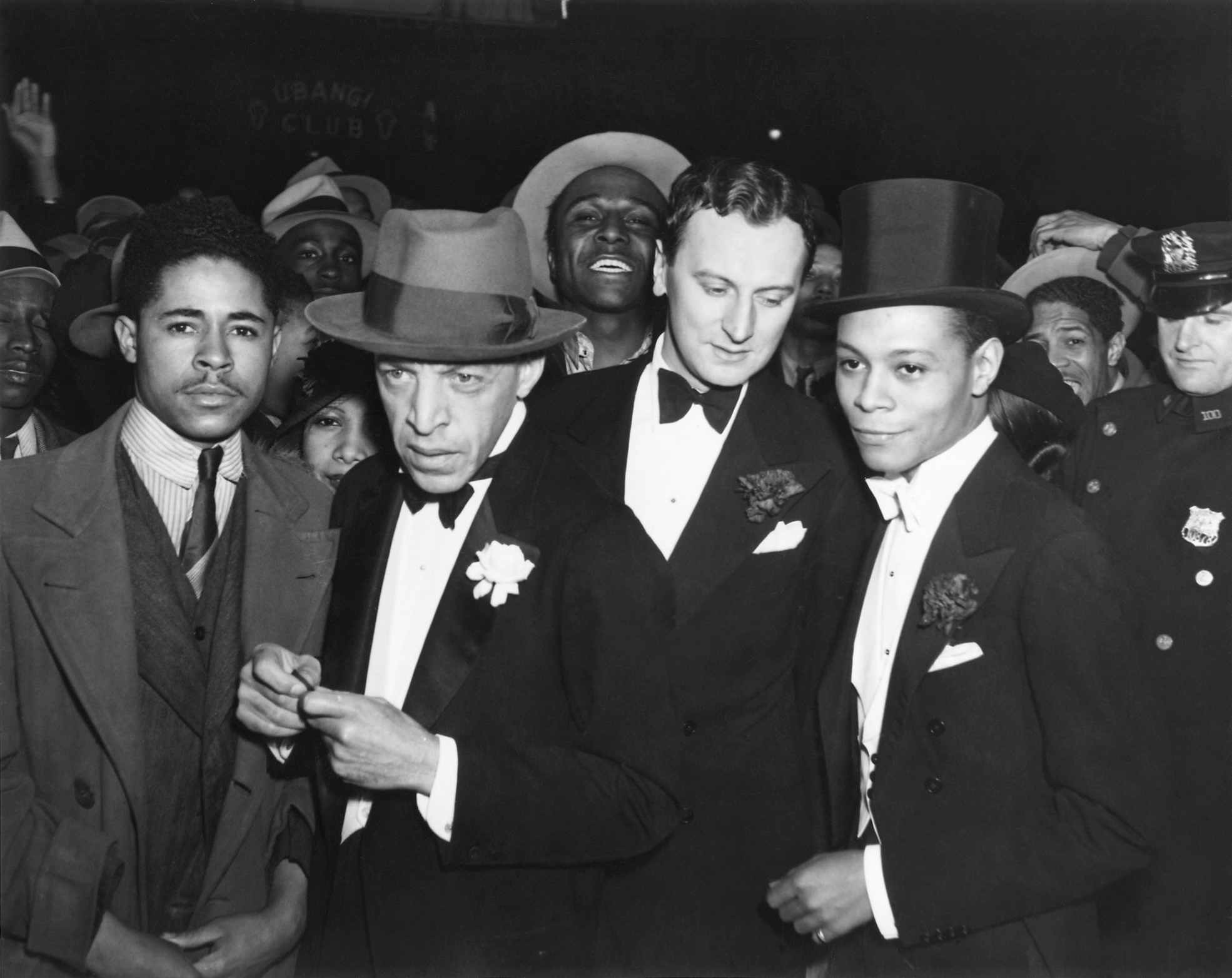
Lloyd Thomas, Kenneth Macpherson and Jimmie Daniels

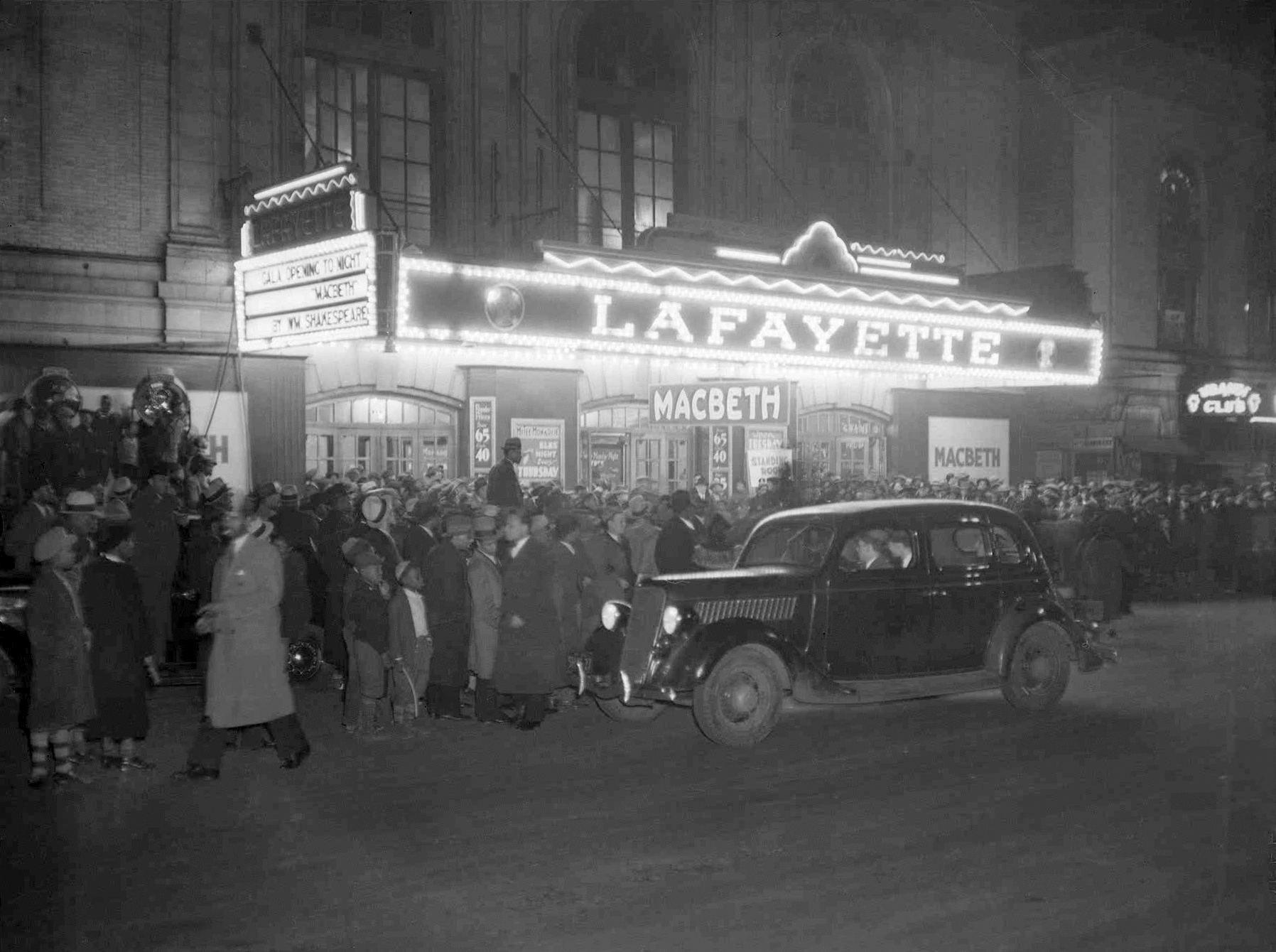
Opening night

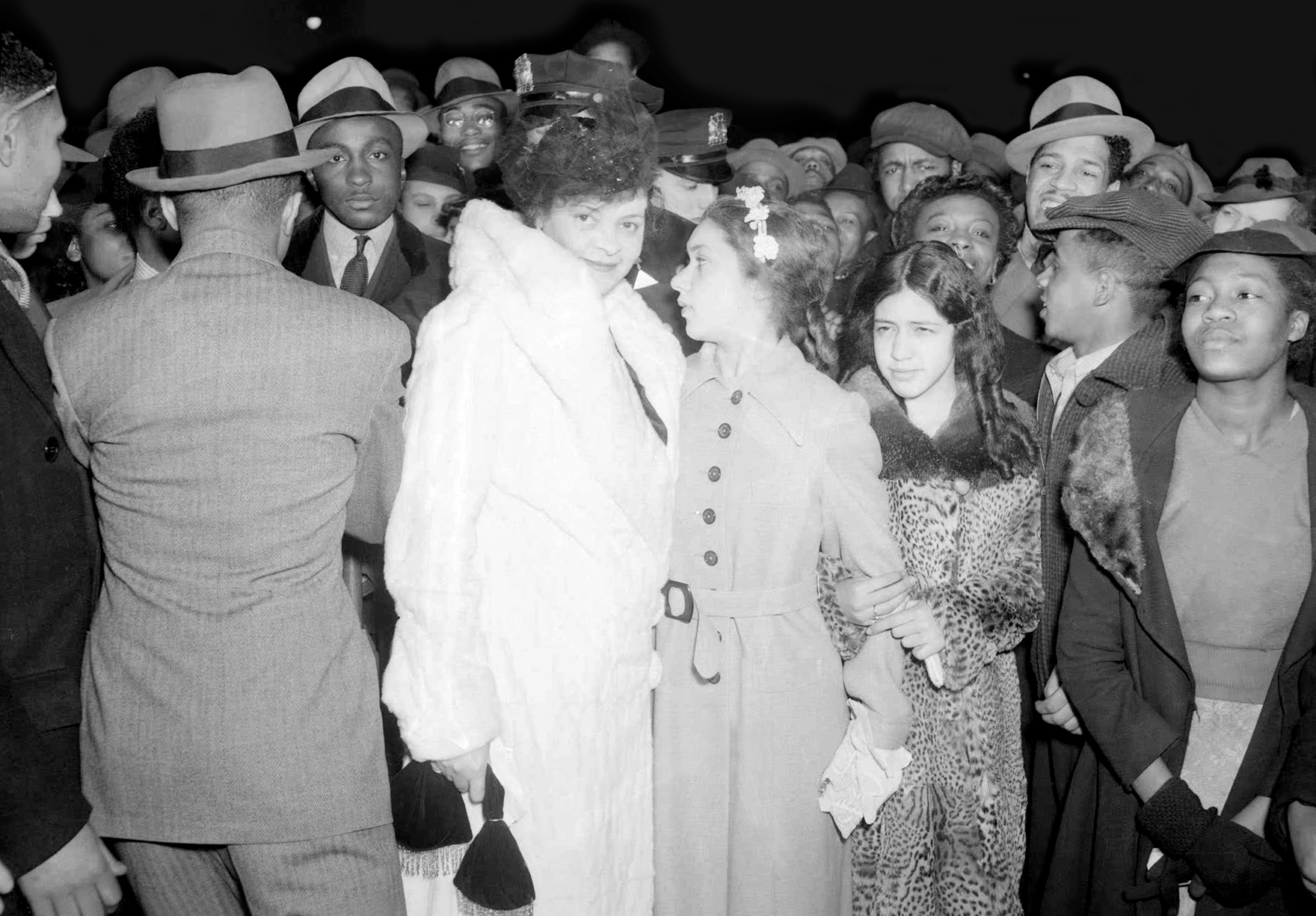
Opening night

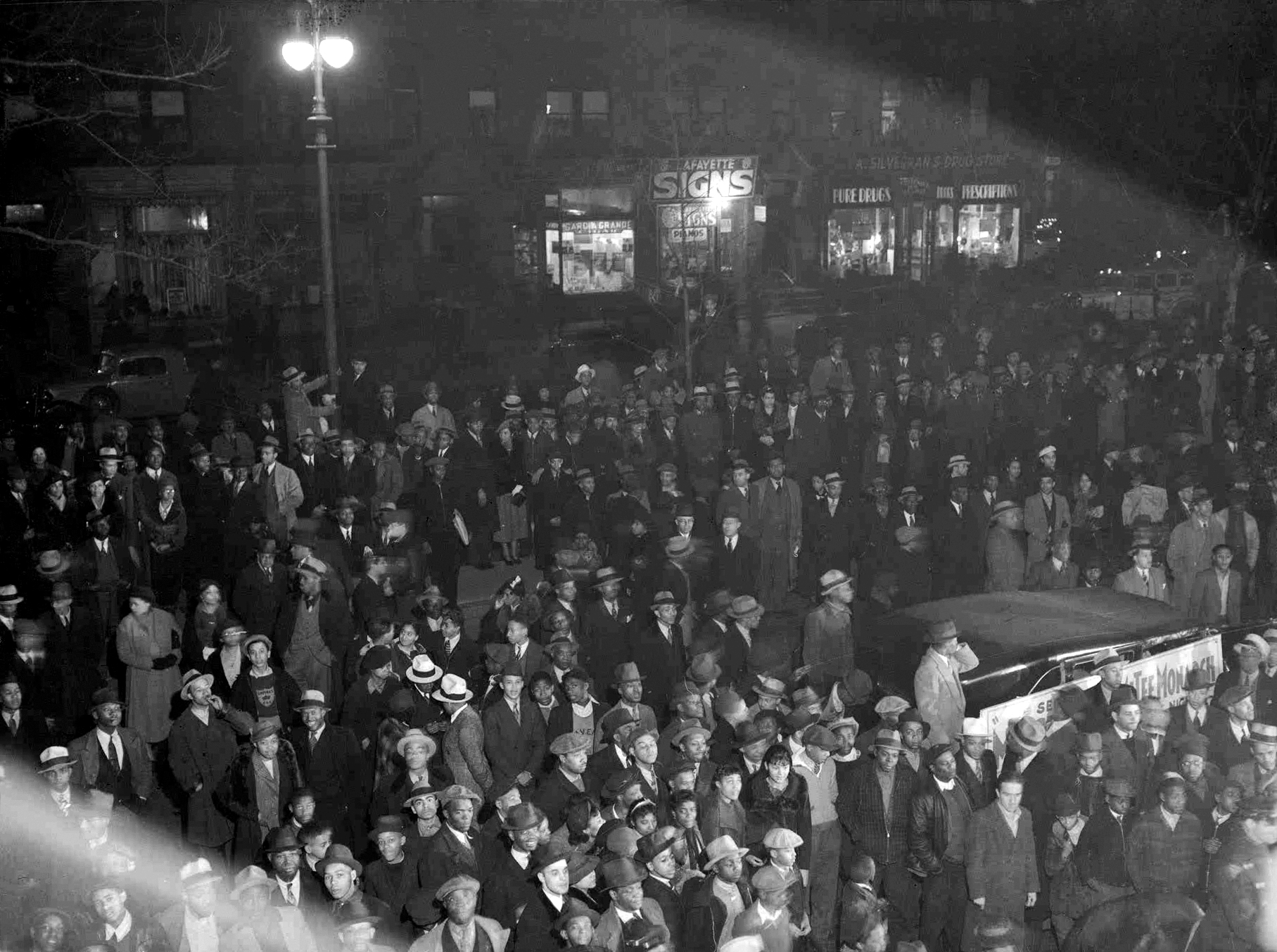
Opening night

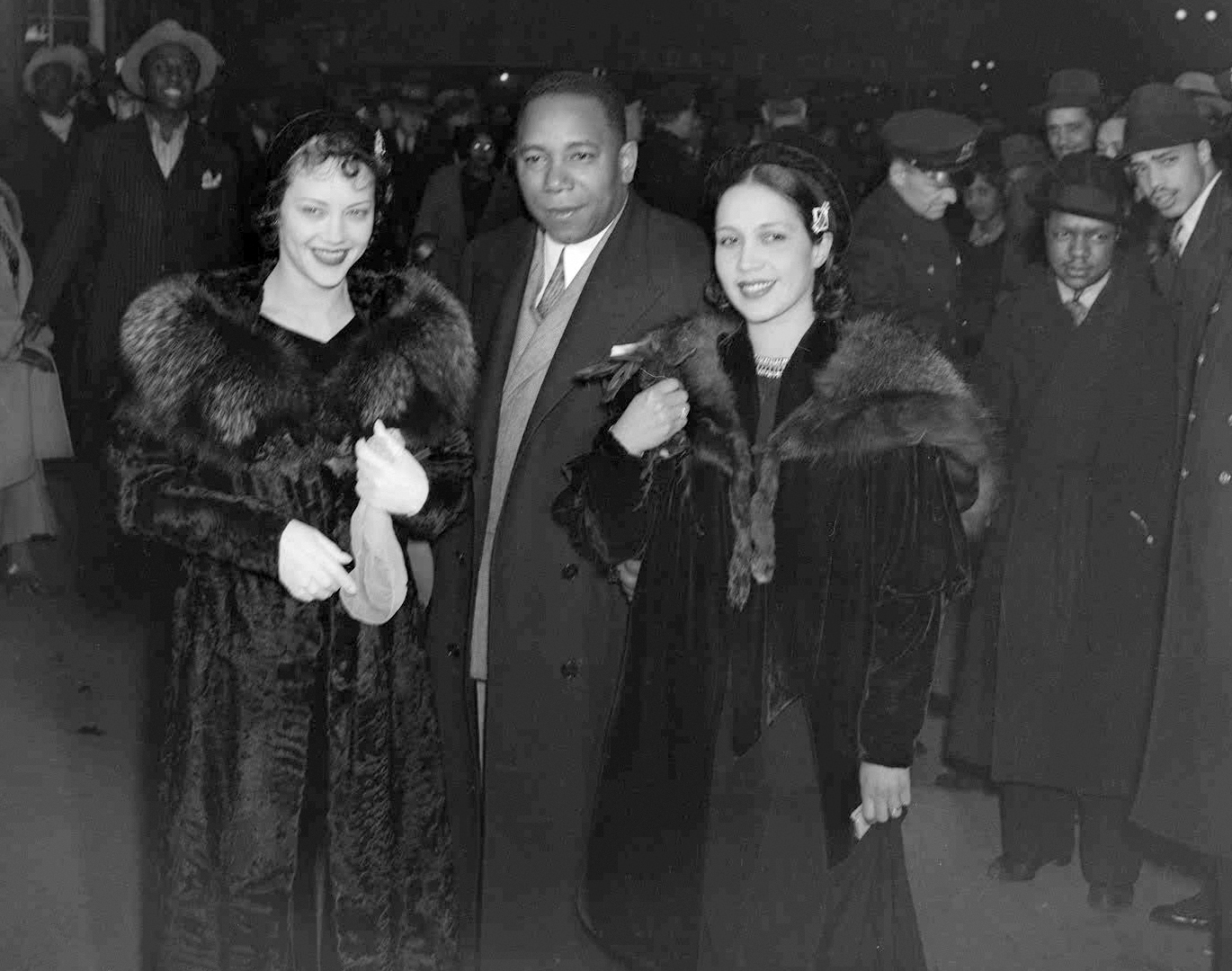
Opening night audience including Fredi Washington (left)

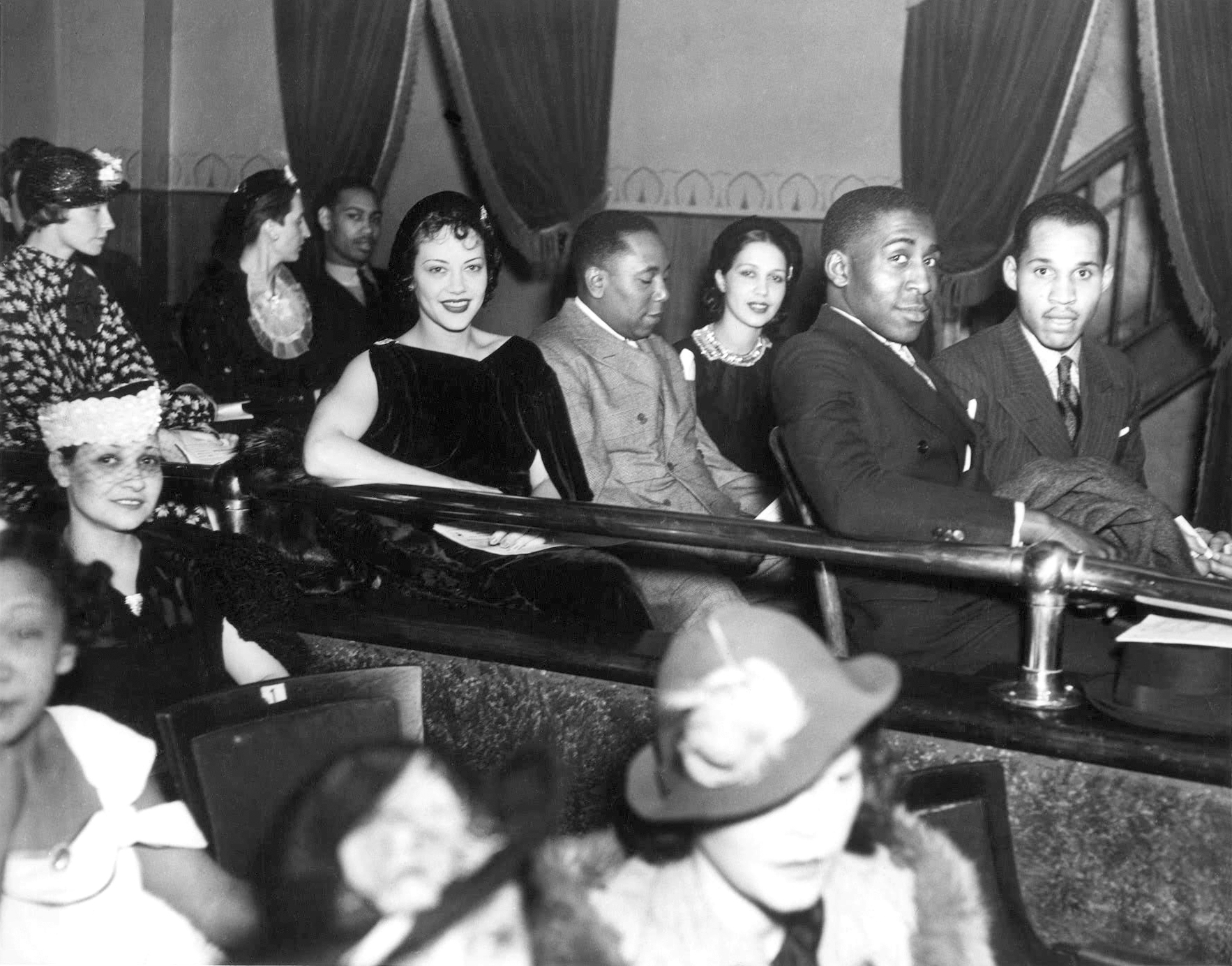
Opening night audience including Fredi Washington

=== Production stills ===
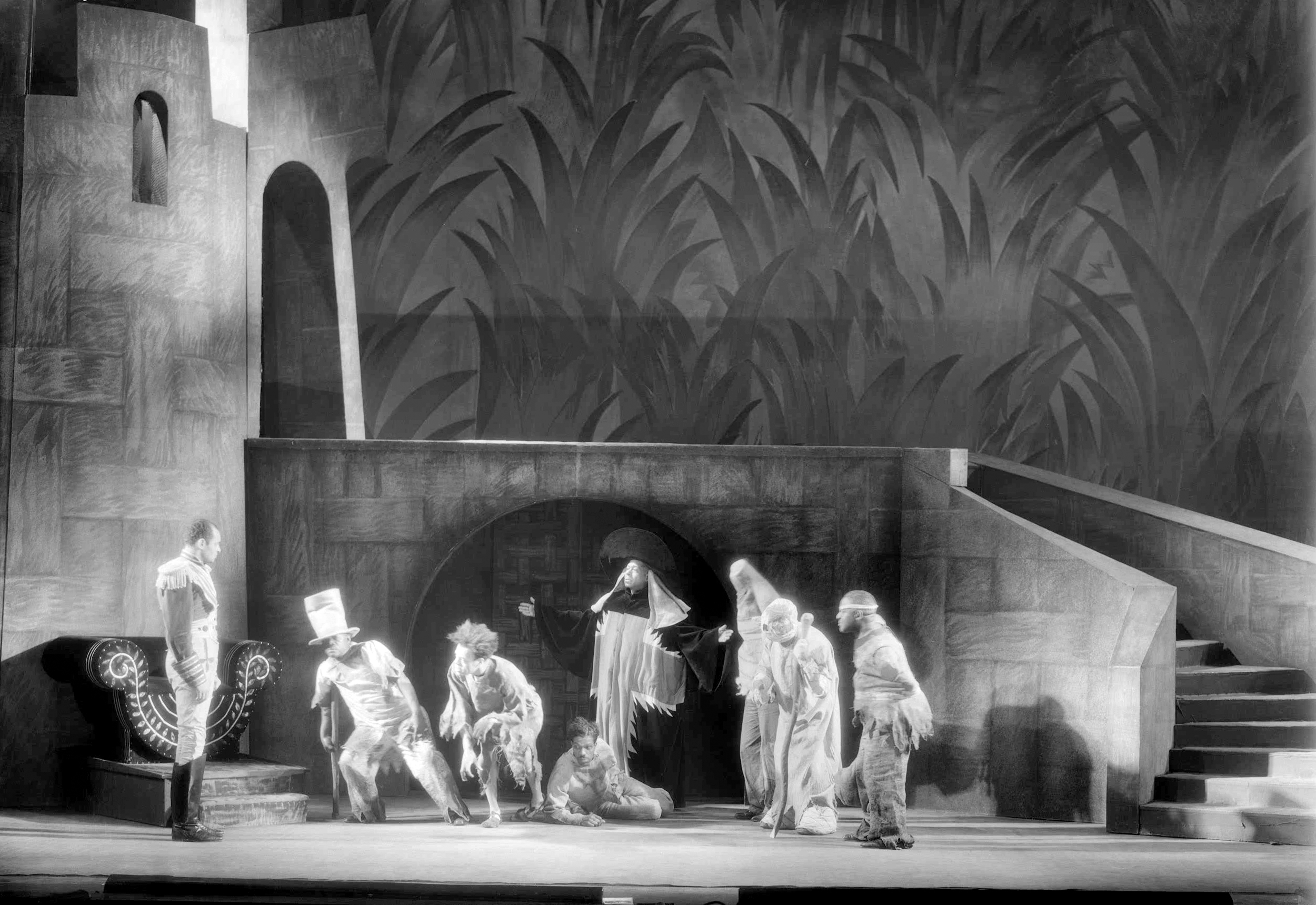
Macbeth with the Priest and cripples seeking the blessing of Duncan

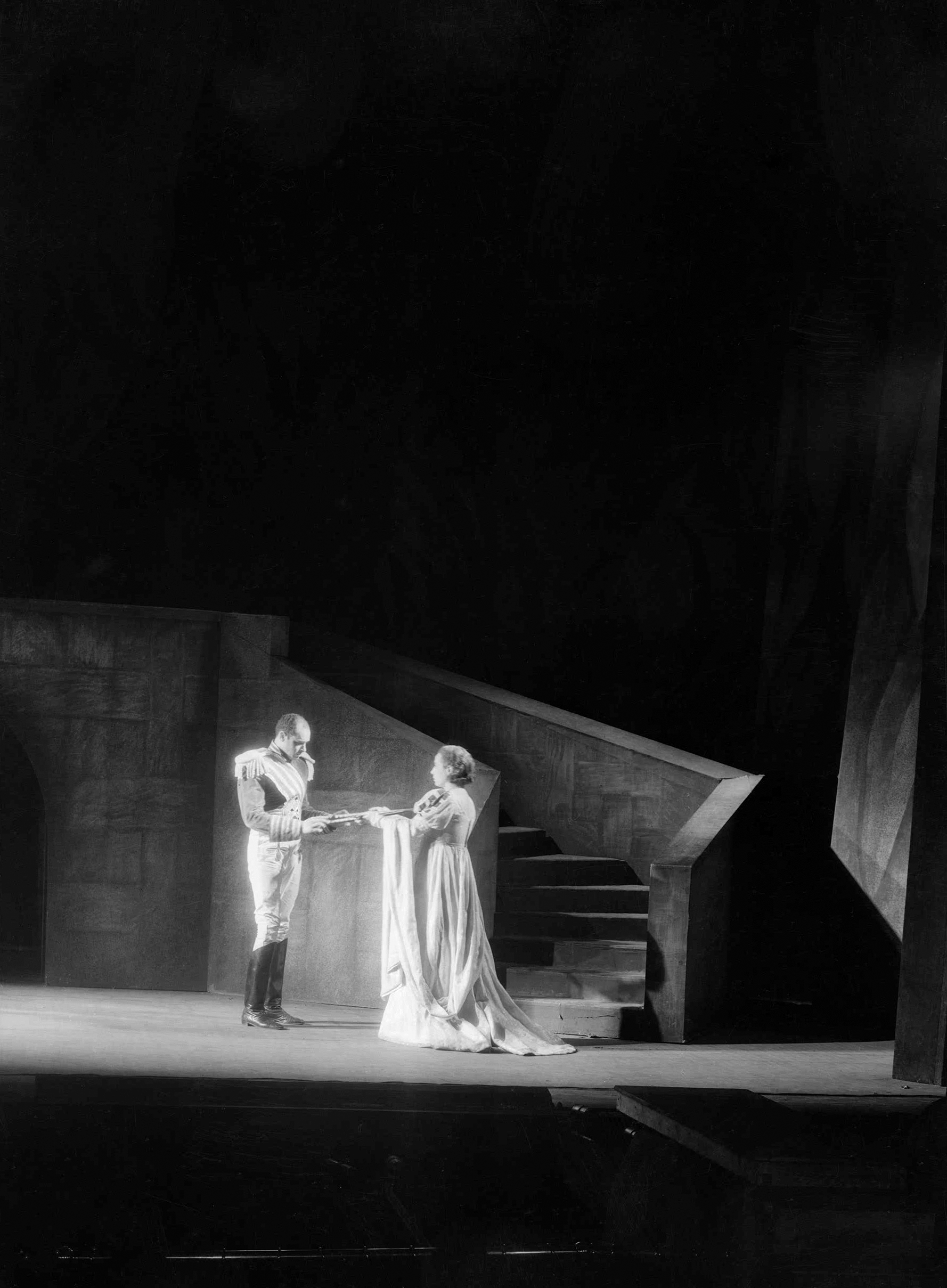
Macbeth and Lady Macbeth

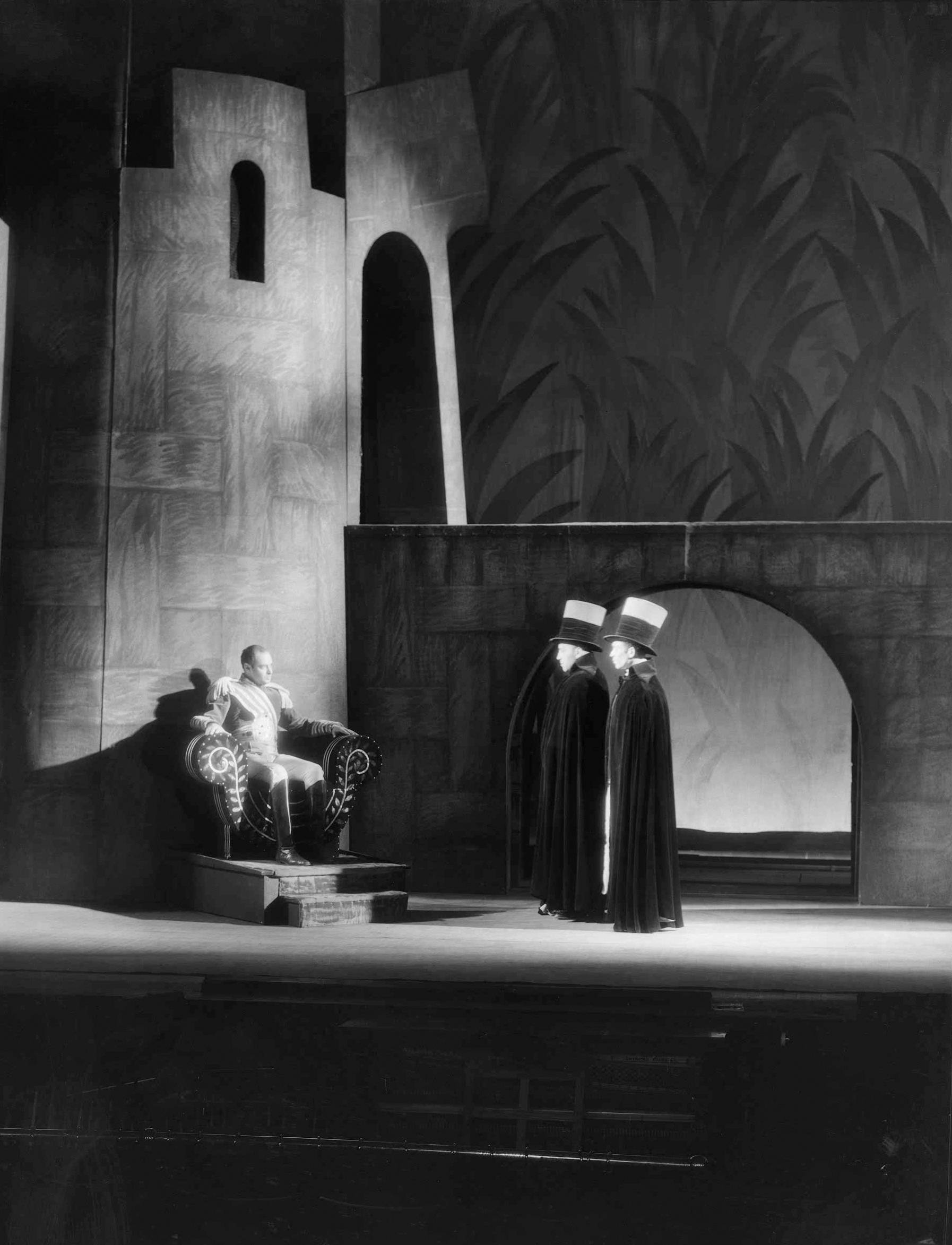
Murderers with Macbeth

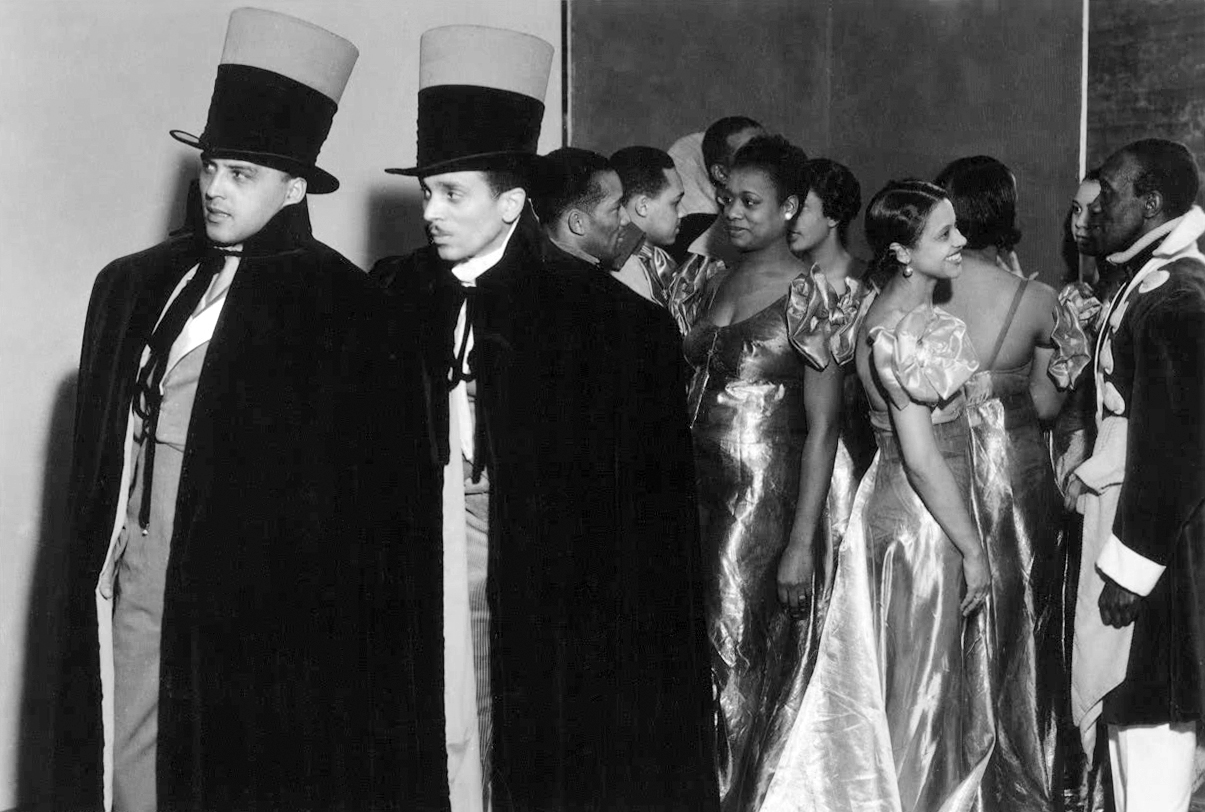
Murderers at Macbeth's coronation ball

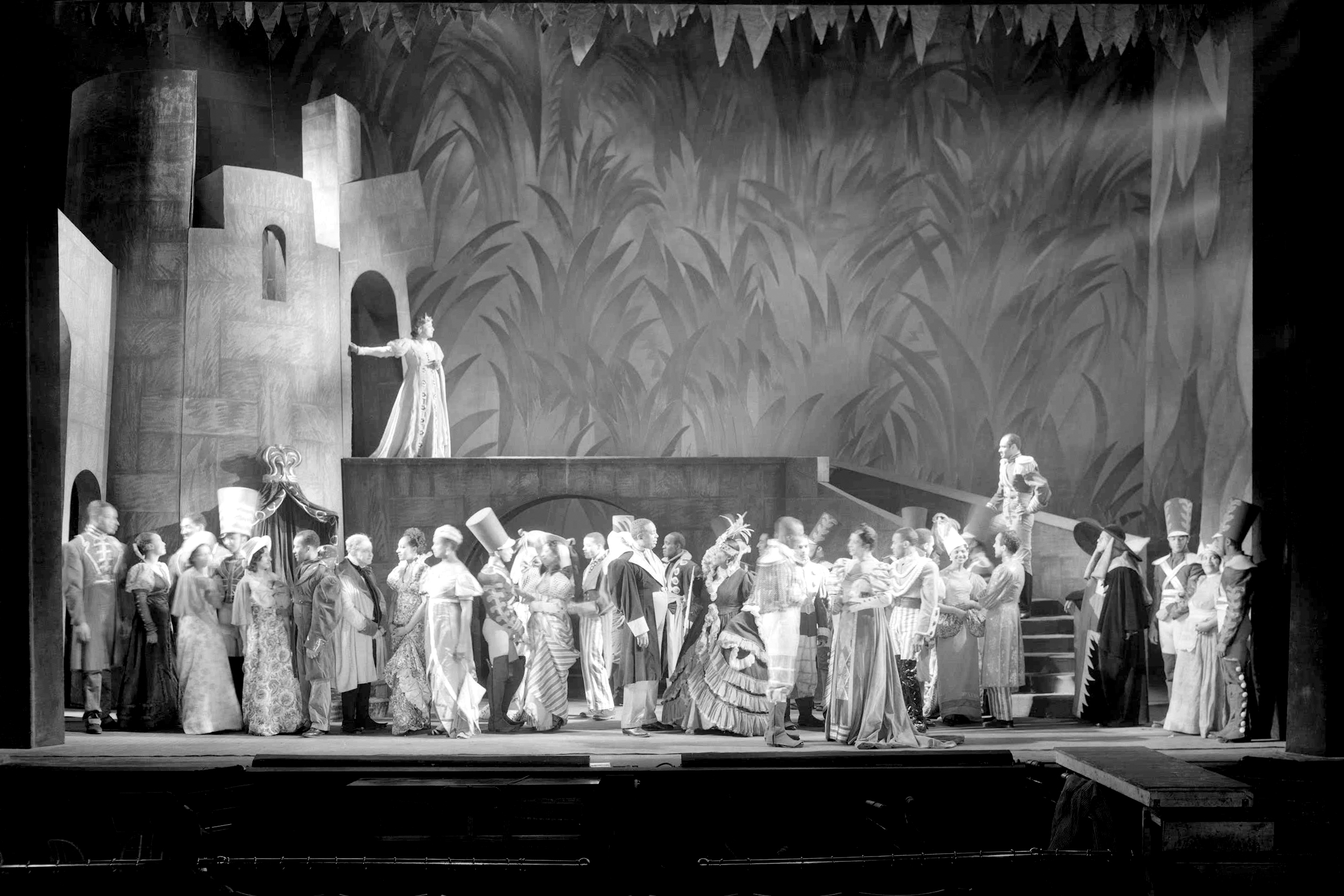
Lady Macbeth quiets the palace guests

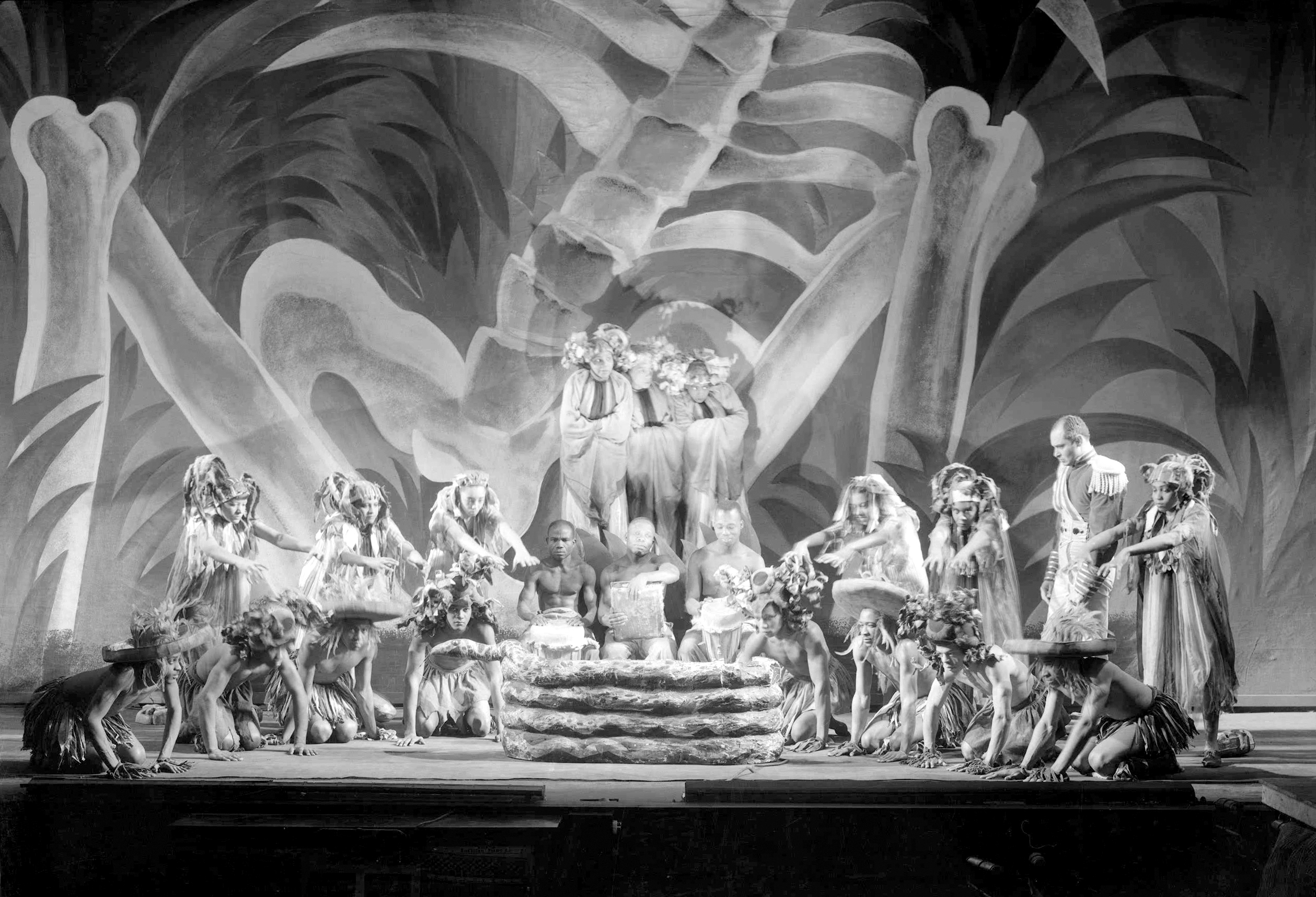
Macbeth with the Three Witches and voodoo celebrants

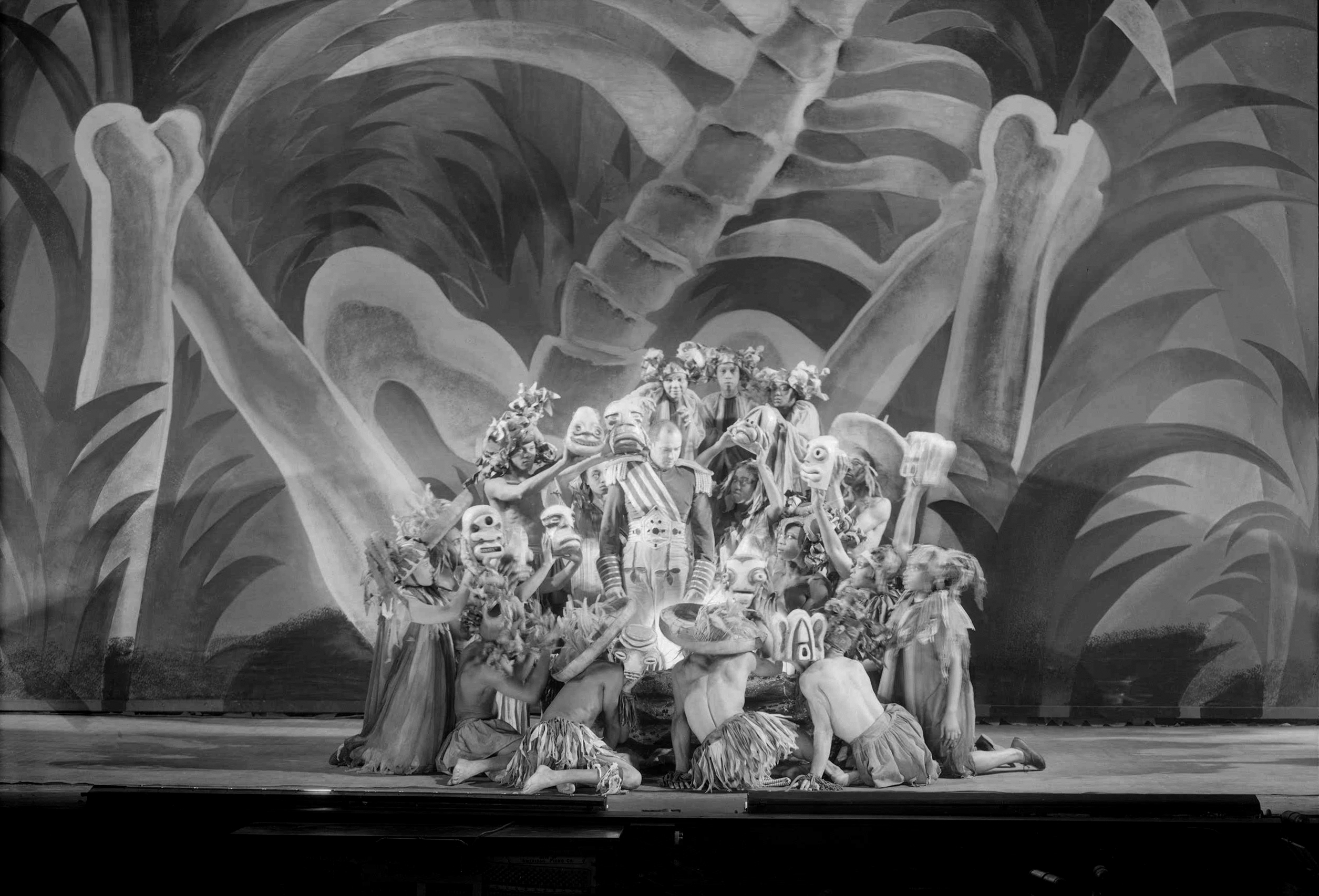
Macbeth

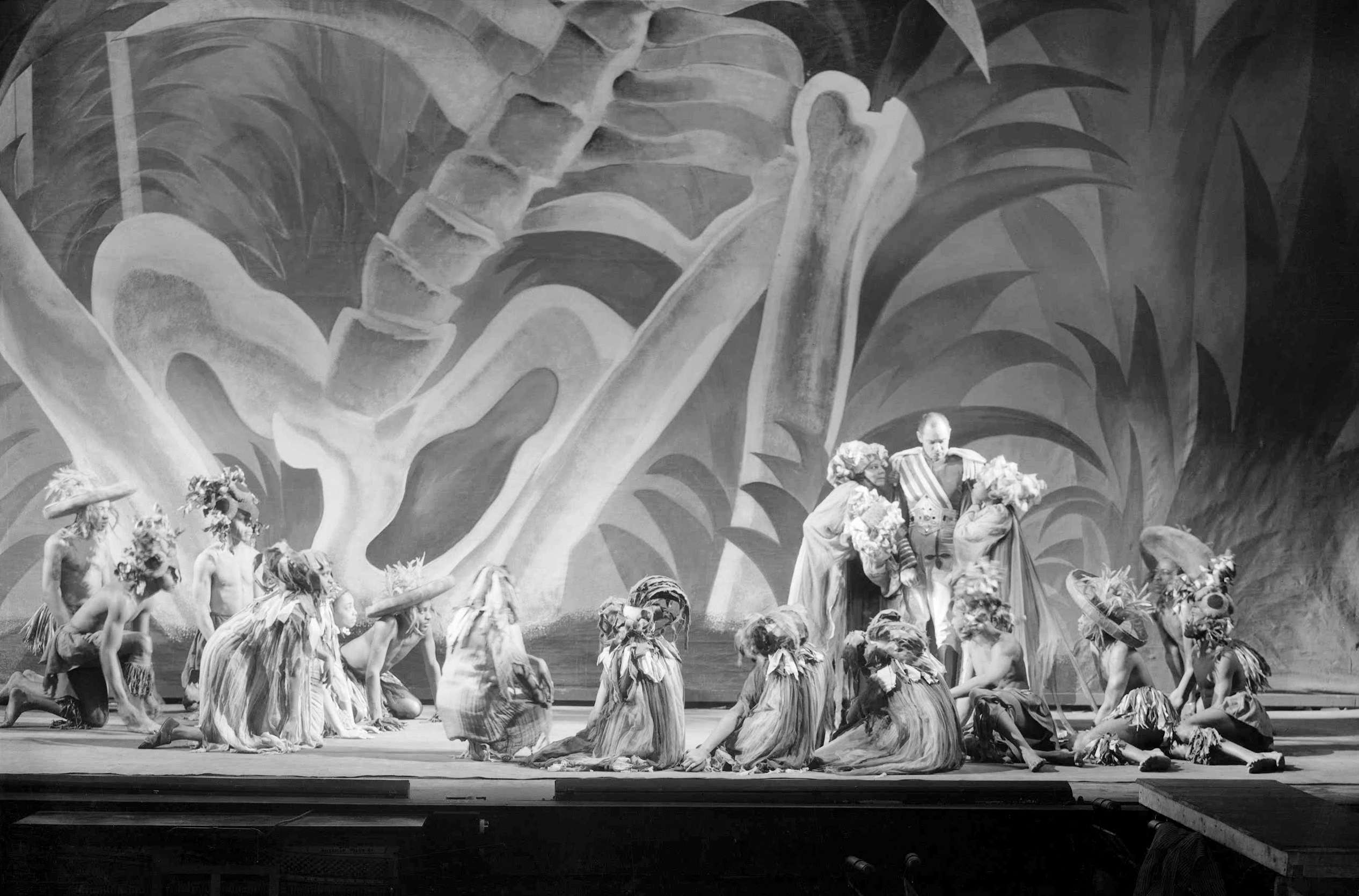
Macbeth

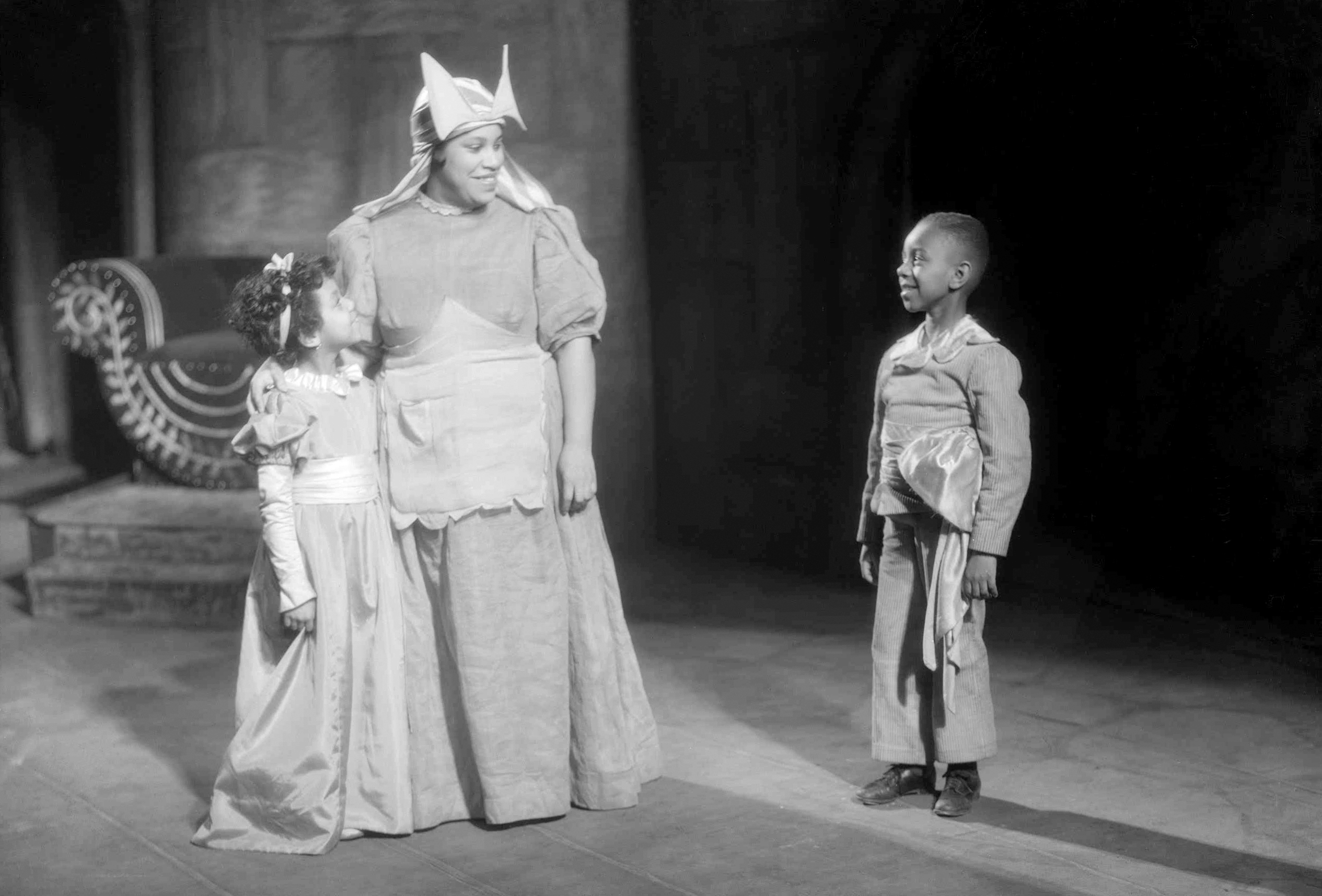
Macduff's son and daughter with Nurse

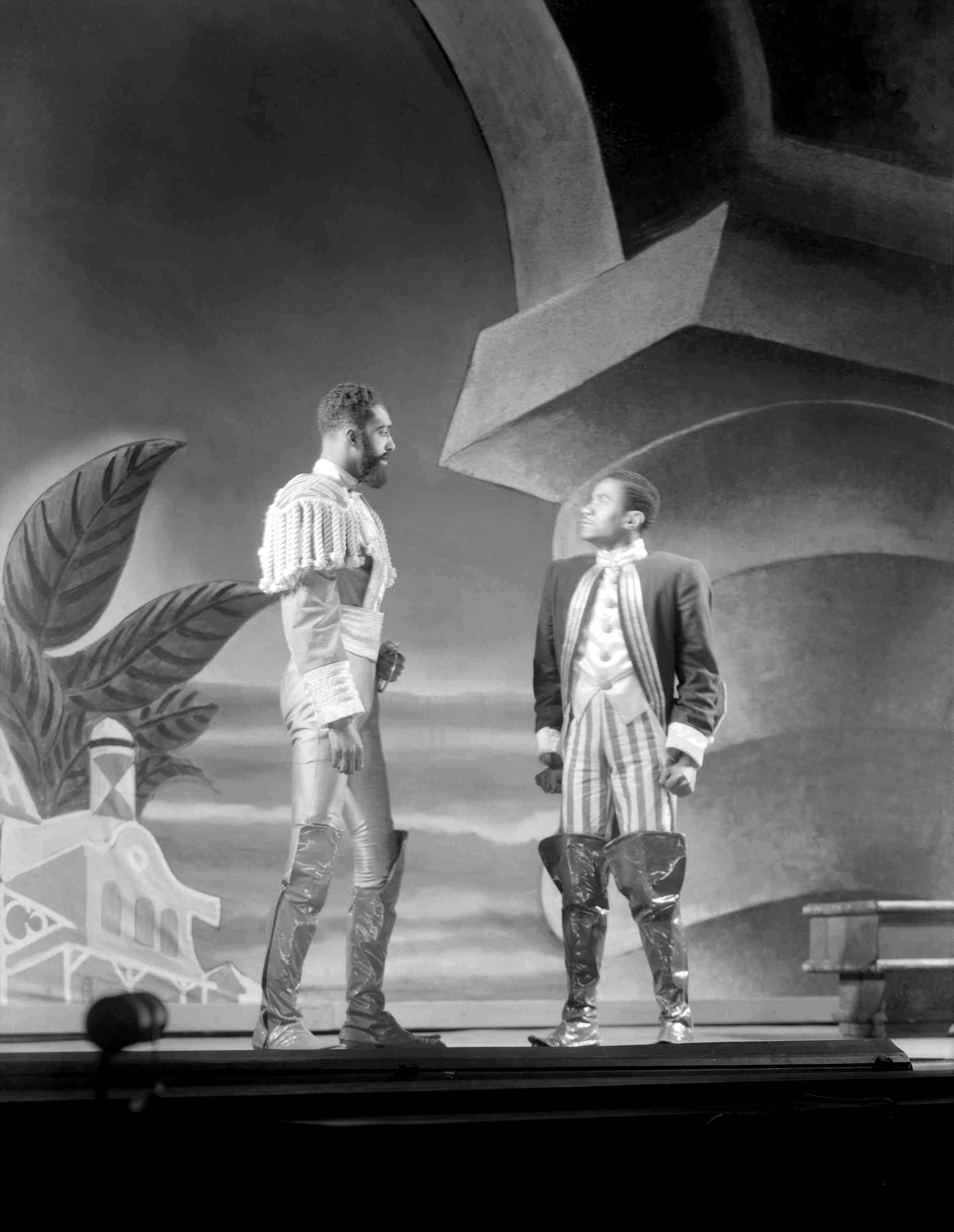
Macduff and Malcolm

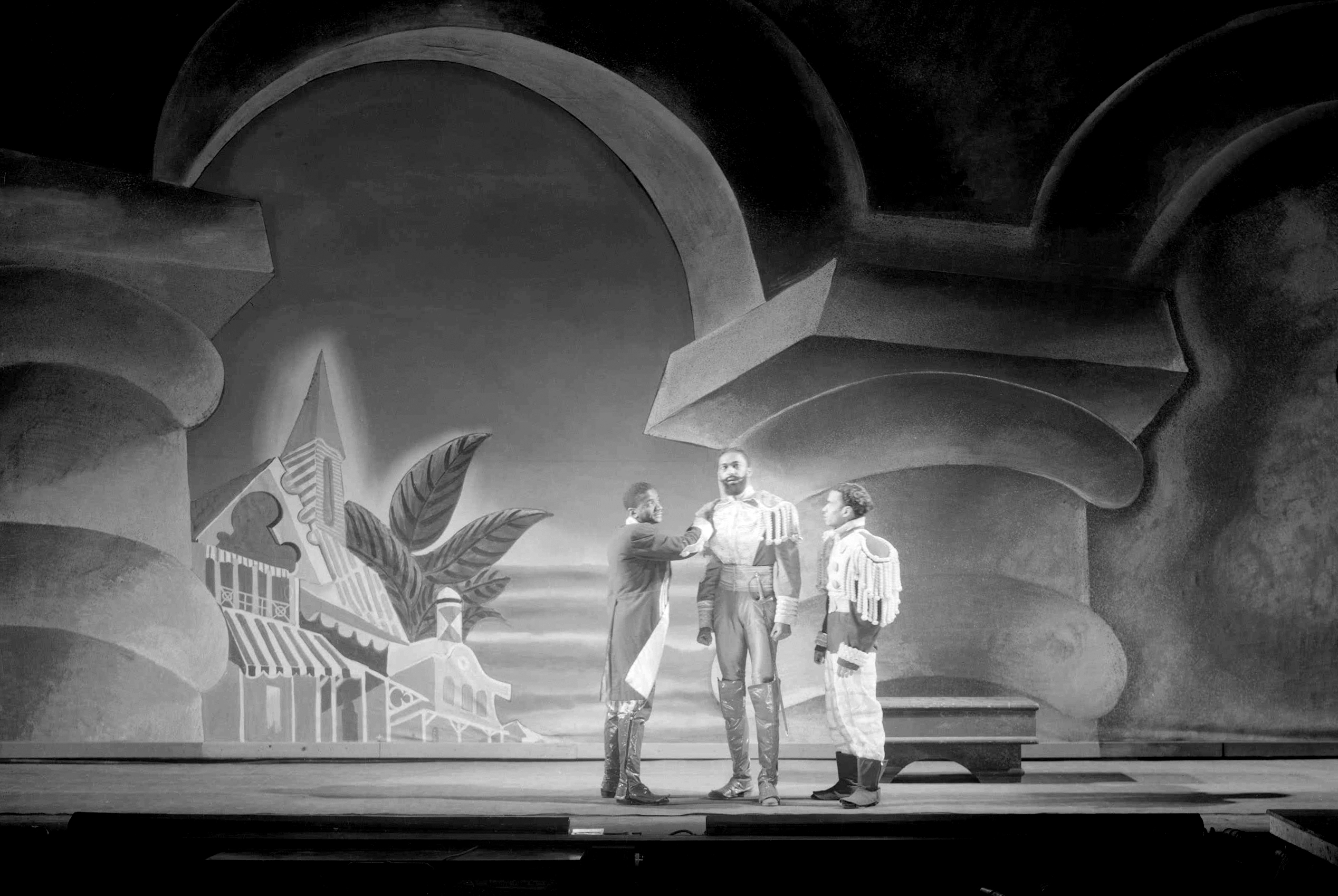
Macduff learns of the murder of his family

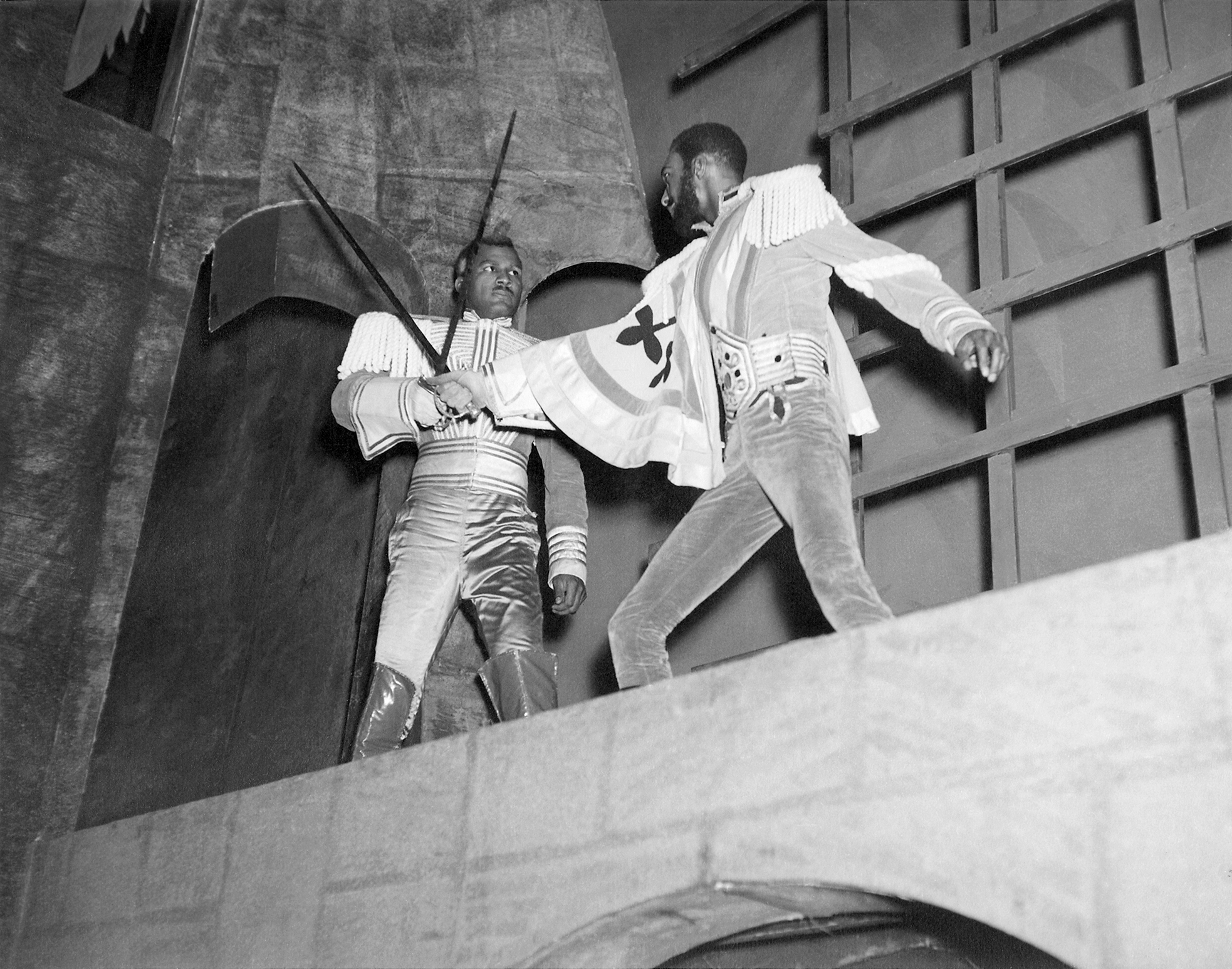
Macduff and Macbeth

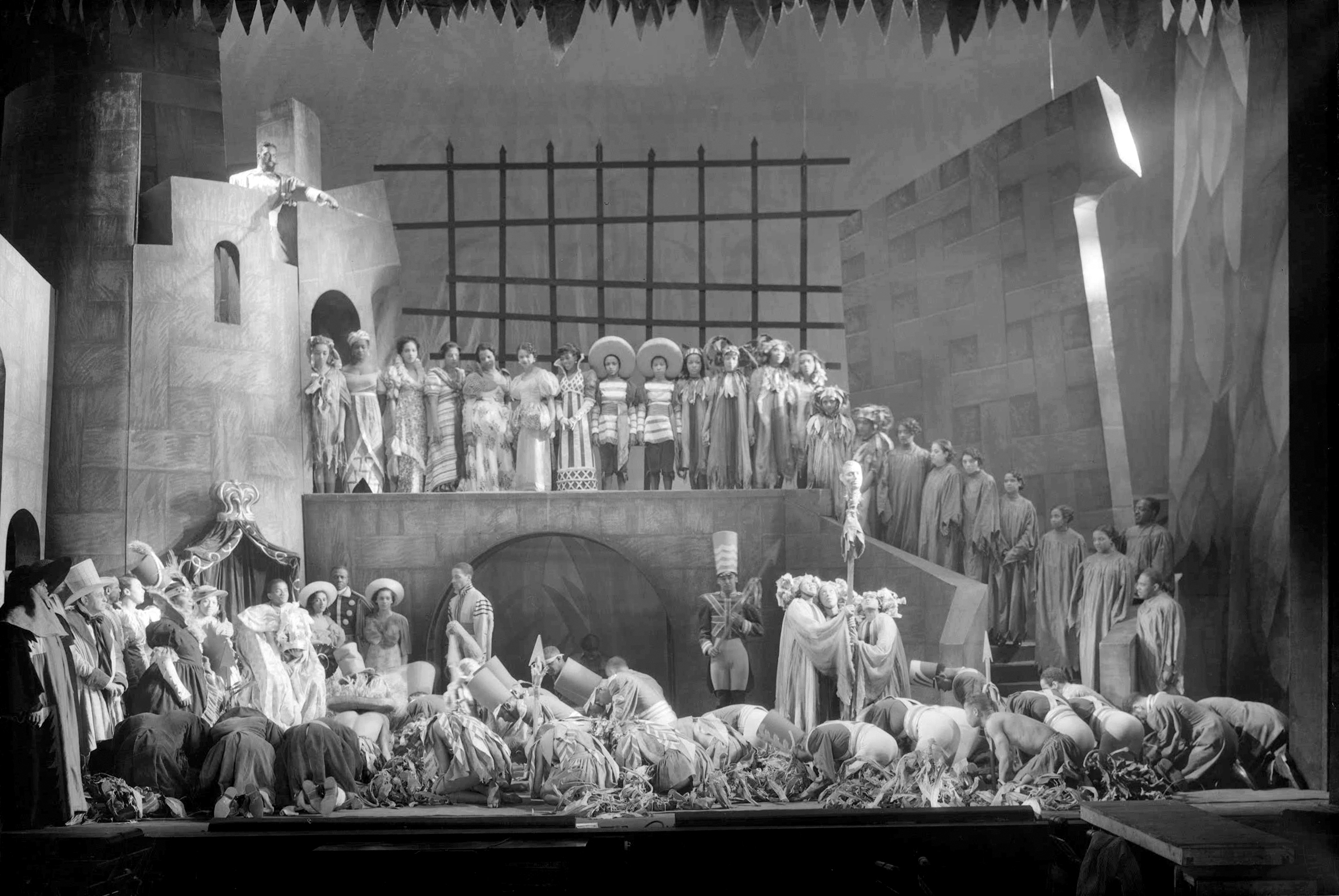
Macduff hails victory over Macbeth

=== Cast portraits ===
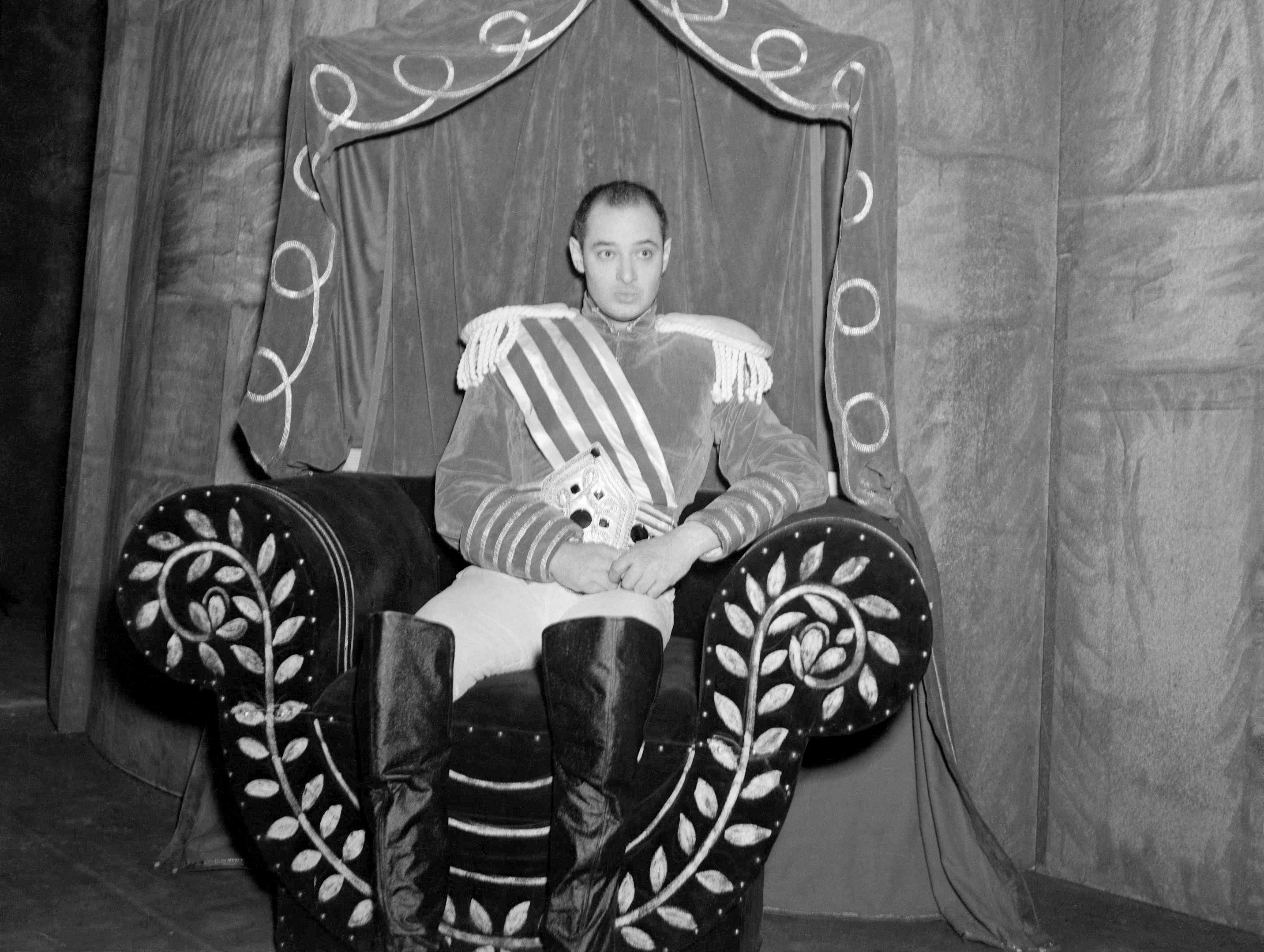
Jack Carter (Macbeth)

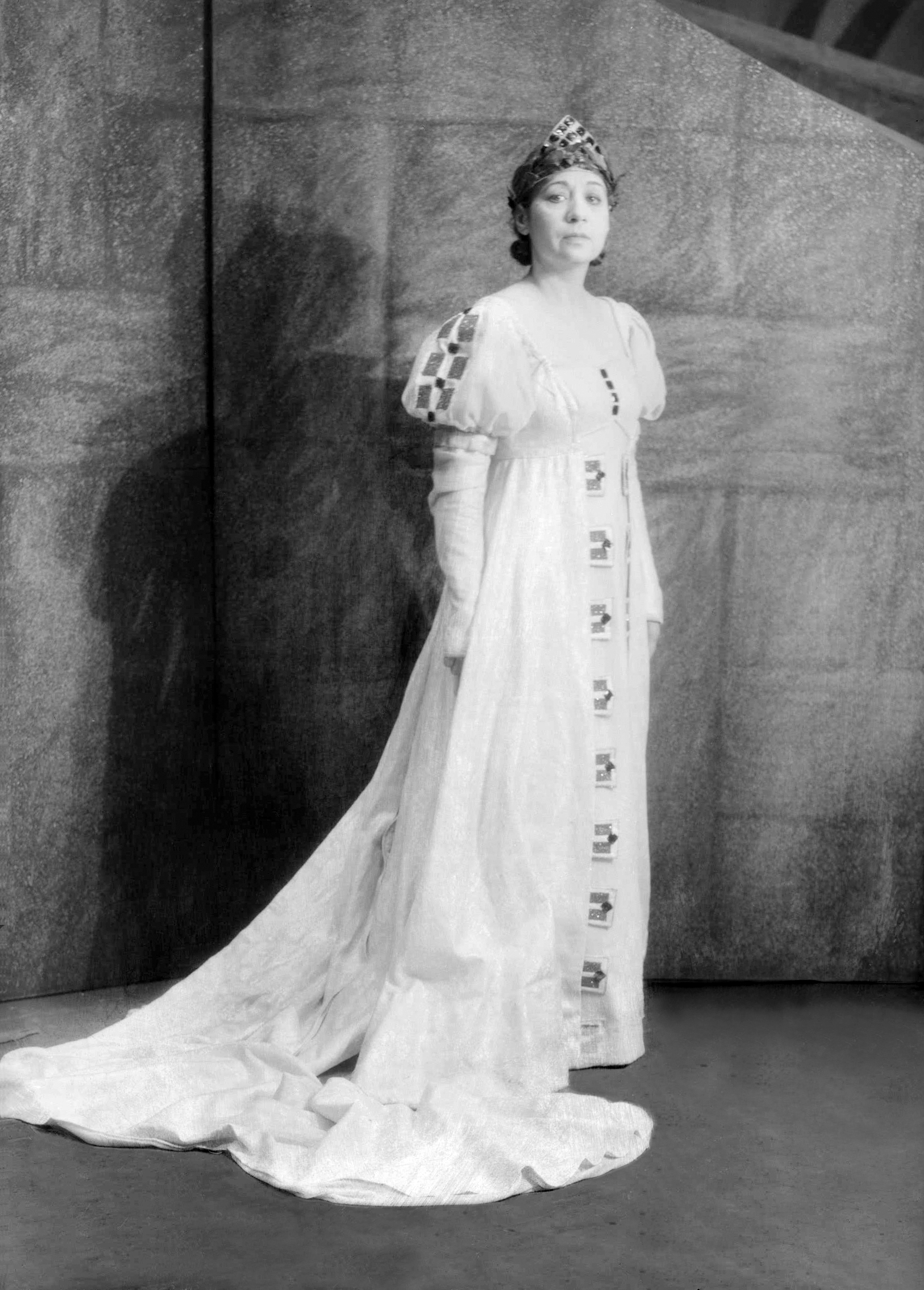
Edna Thomas (Lady Macbeth)

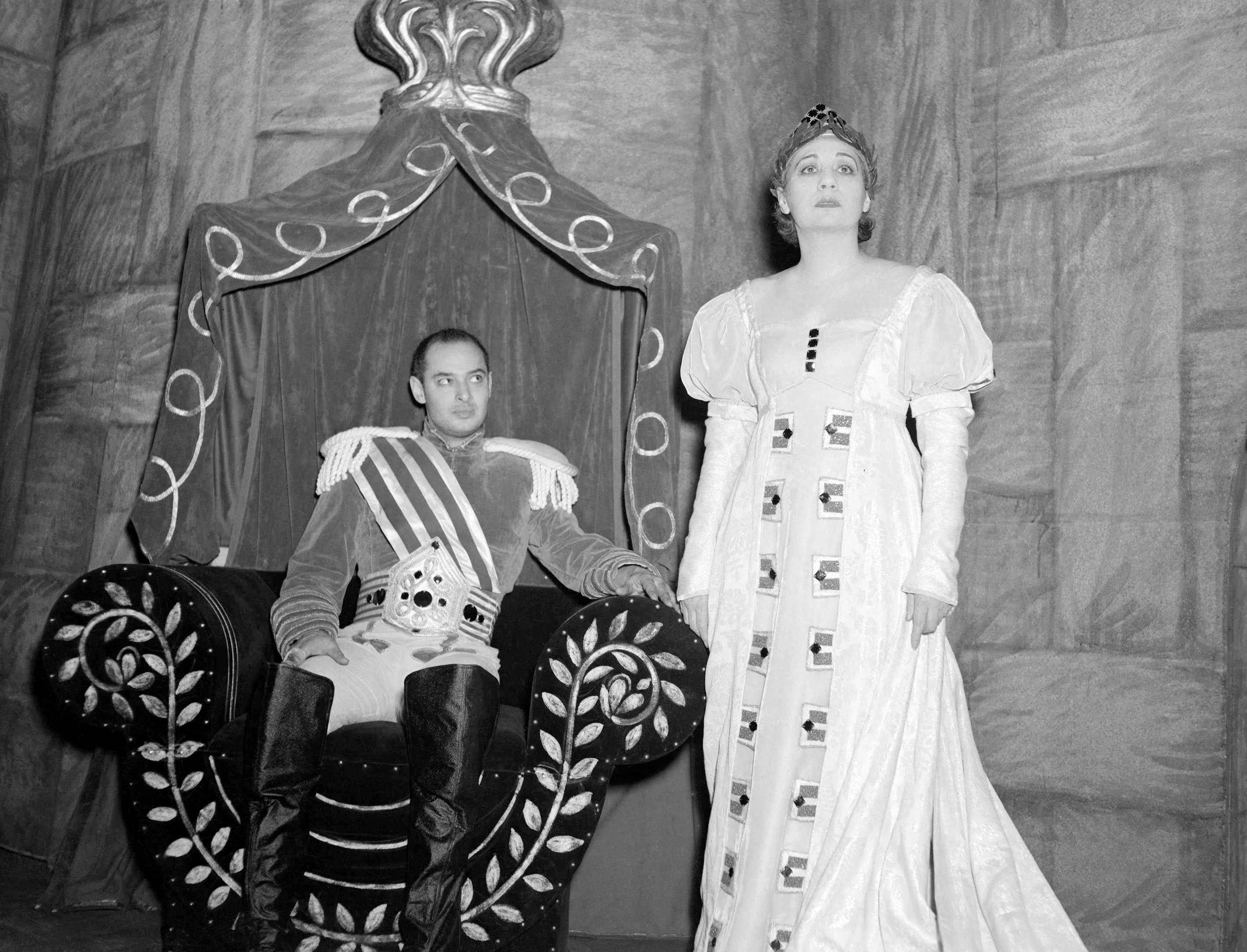
Jack Carter and Edna Thomas

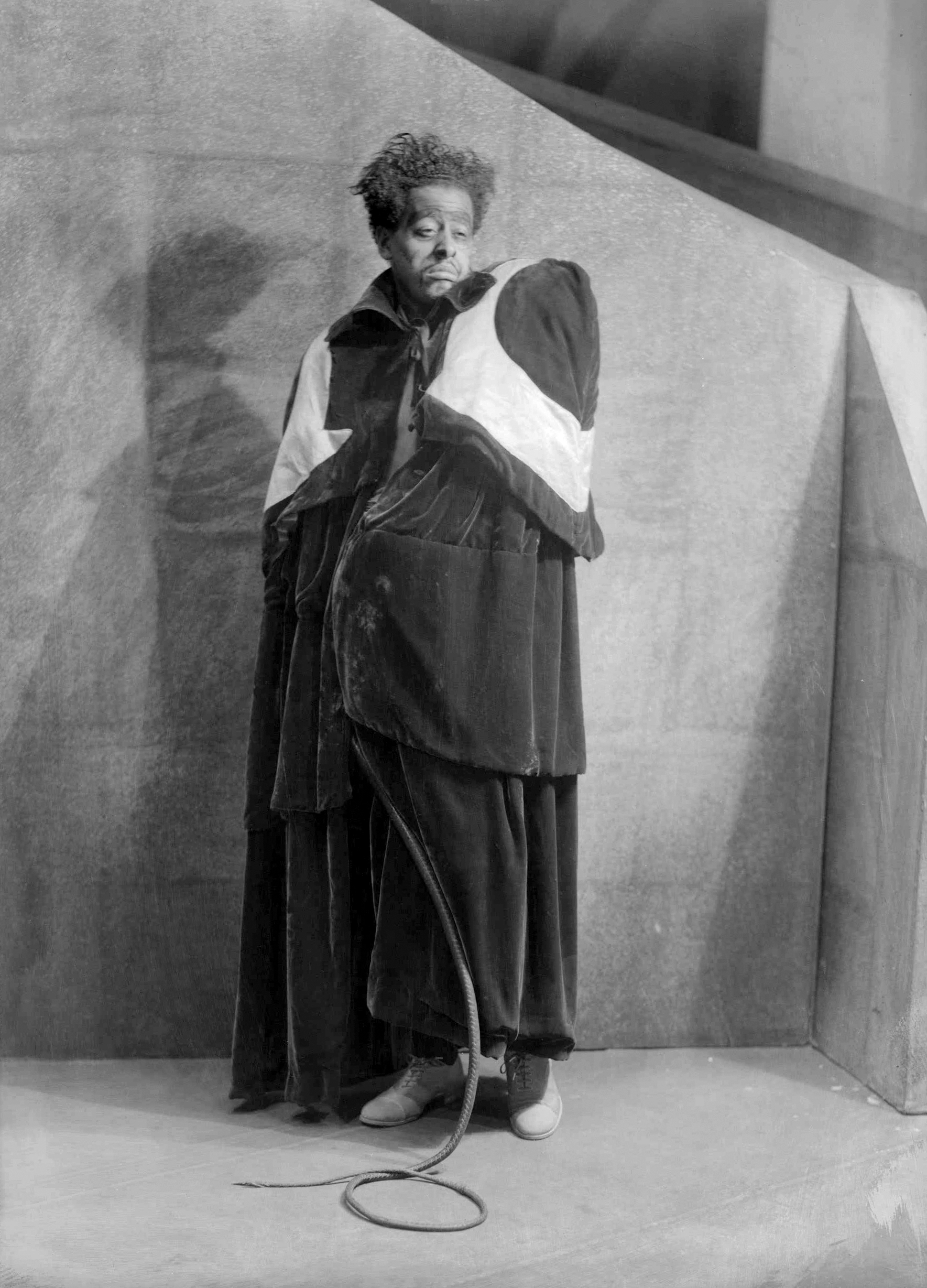
Eric Burroughs (Hecate)

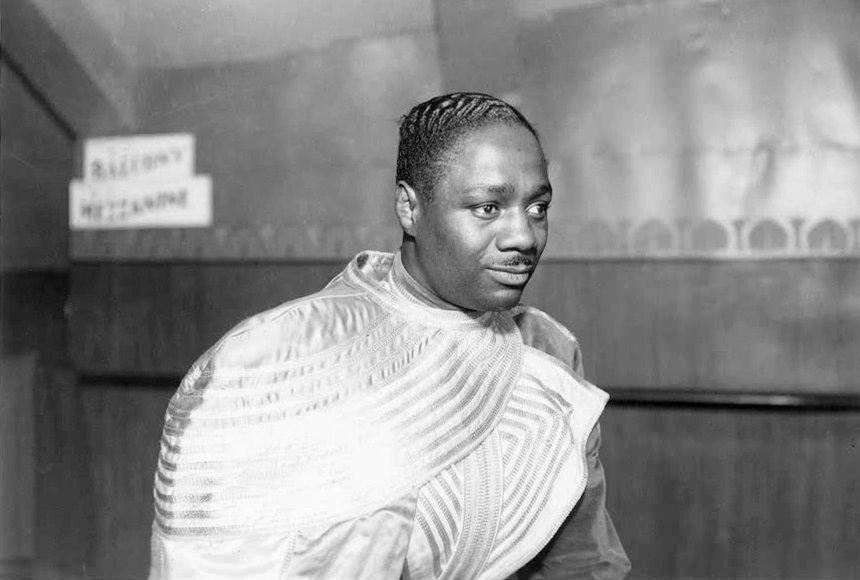
Canada Lee (Banquo)

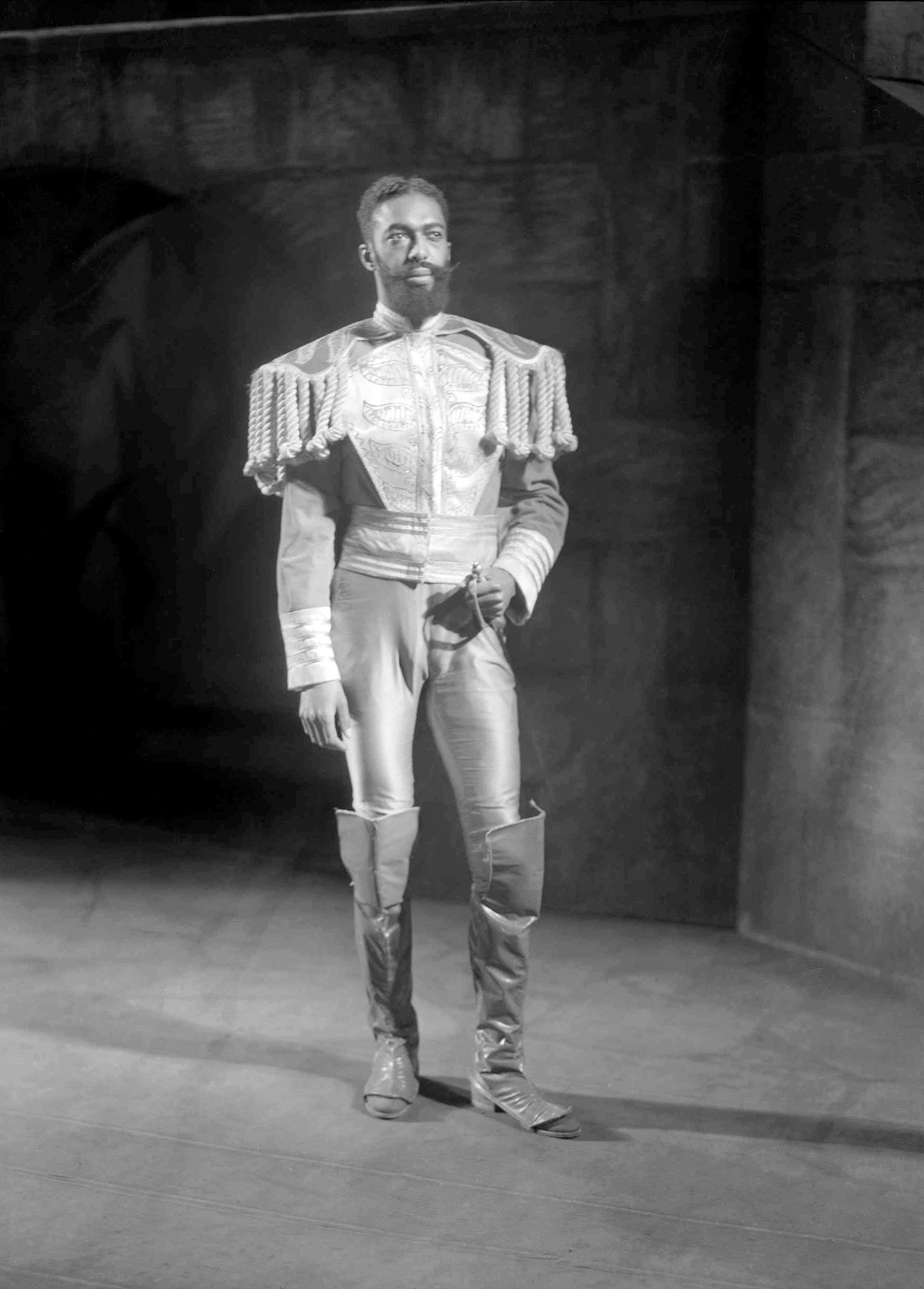
Maurice Ellis (Macduff)

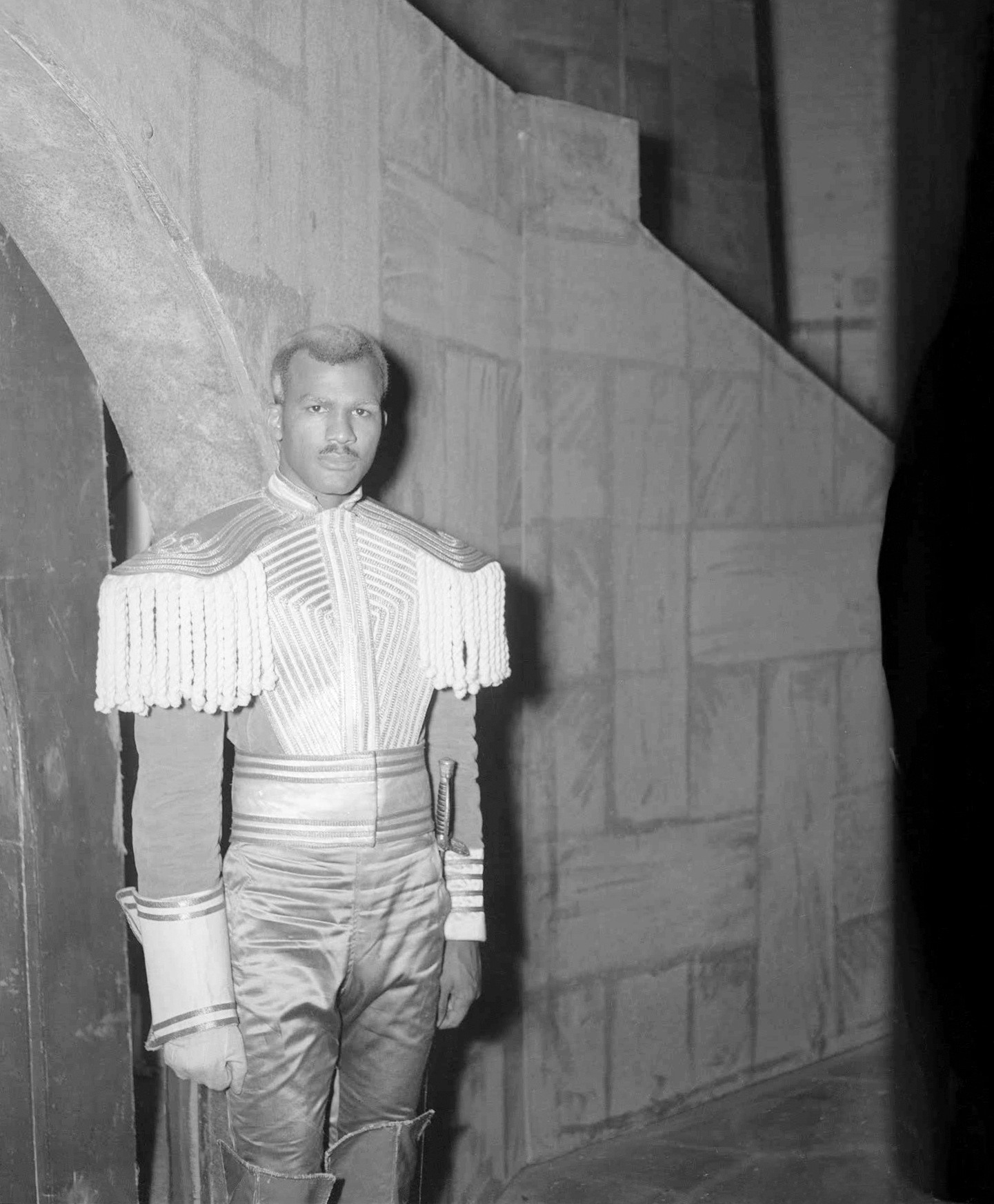
Charles Collins (Macduff)

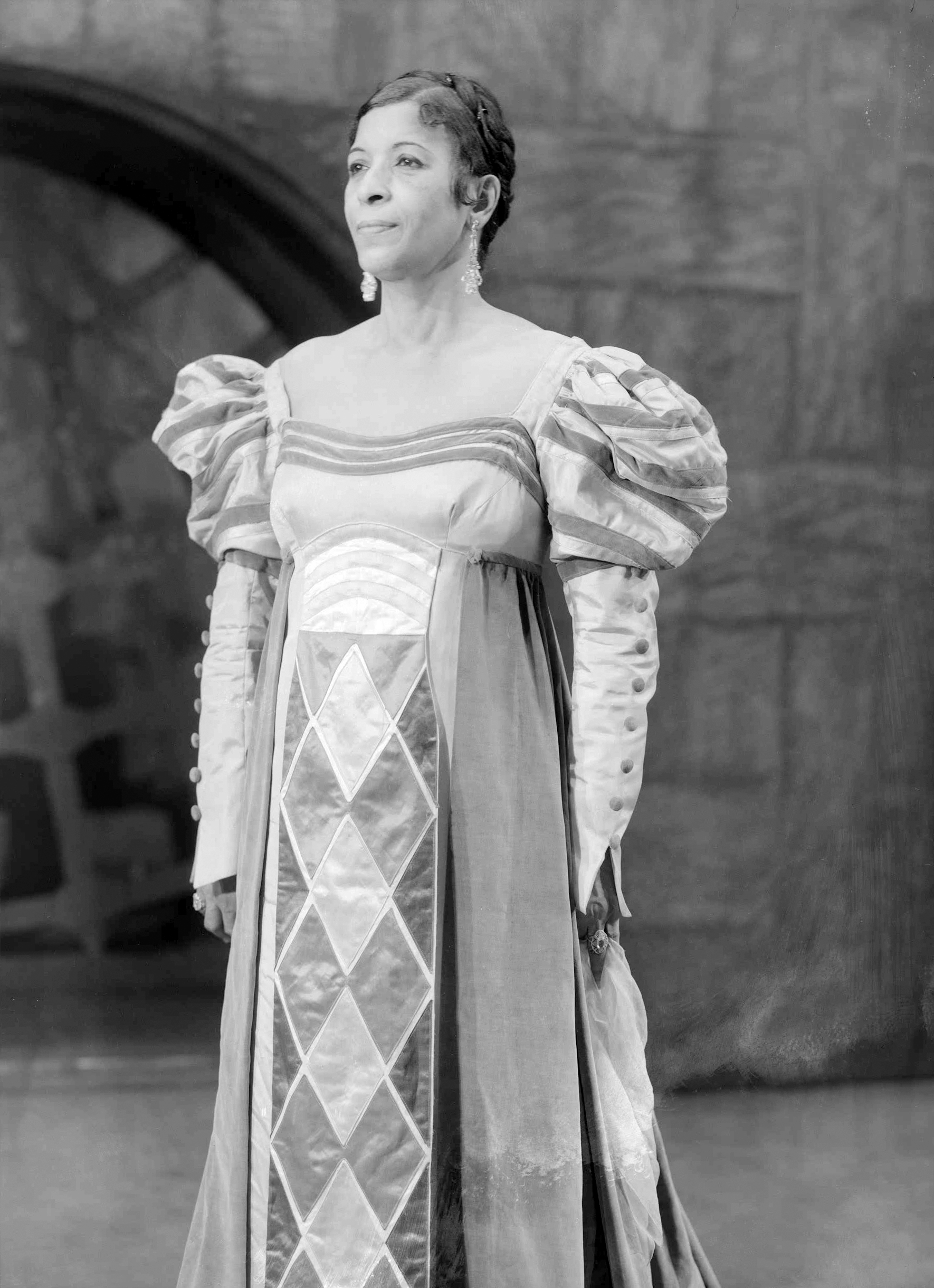
Marie Young (Lady Macduff)

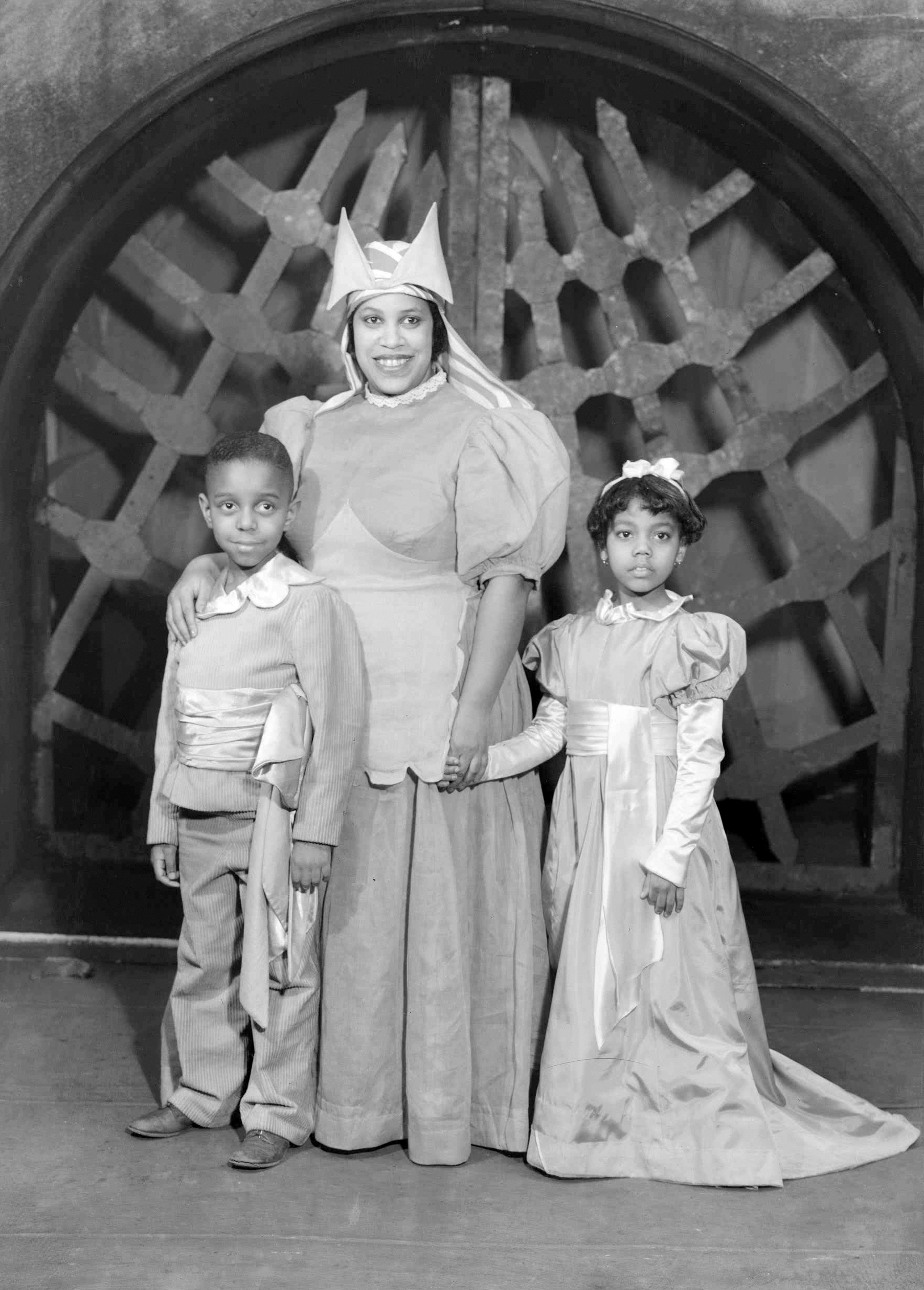
Virginia Girvin (Nurse), Bertram Holmes and Wanda Macy

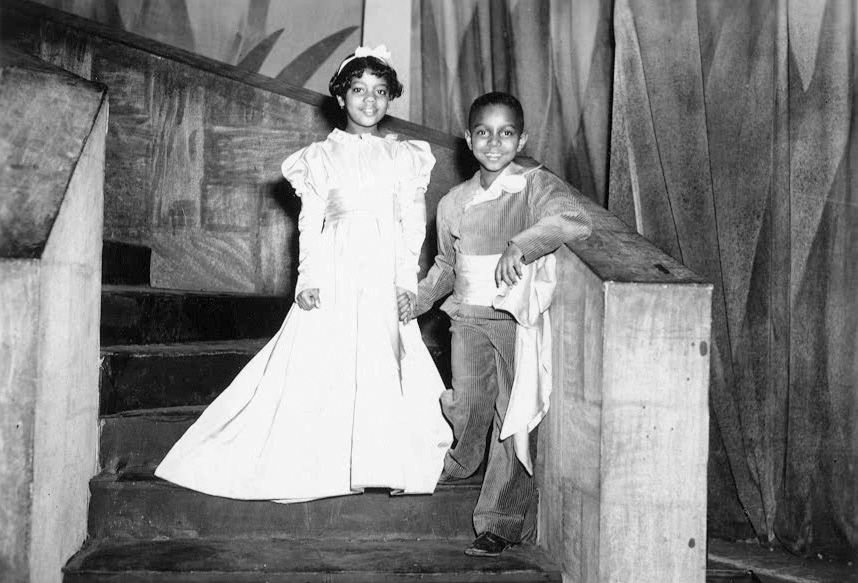
Wanda Macy and Bertram Holmes (Macduff's children)

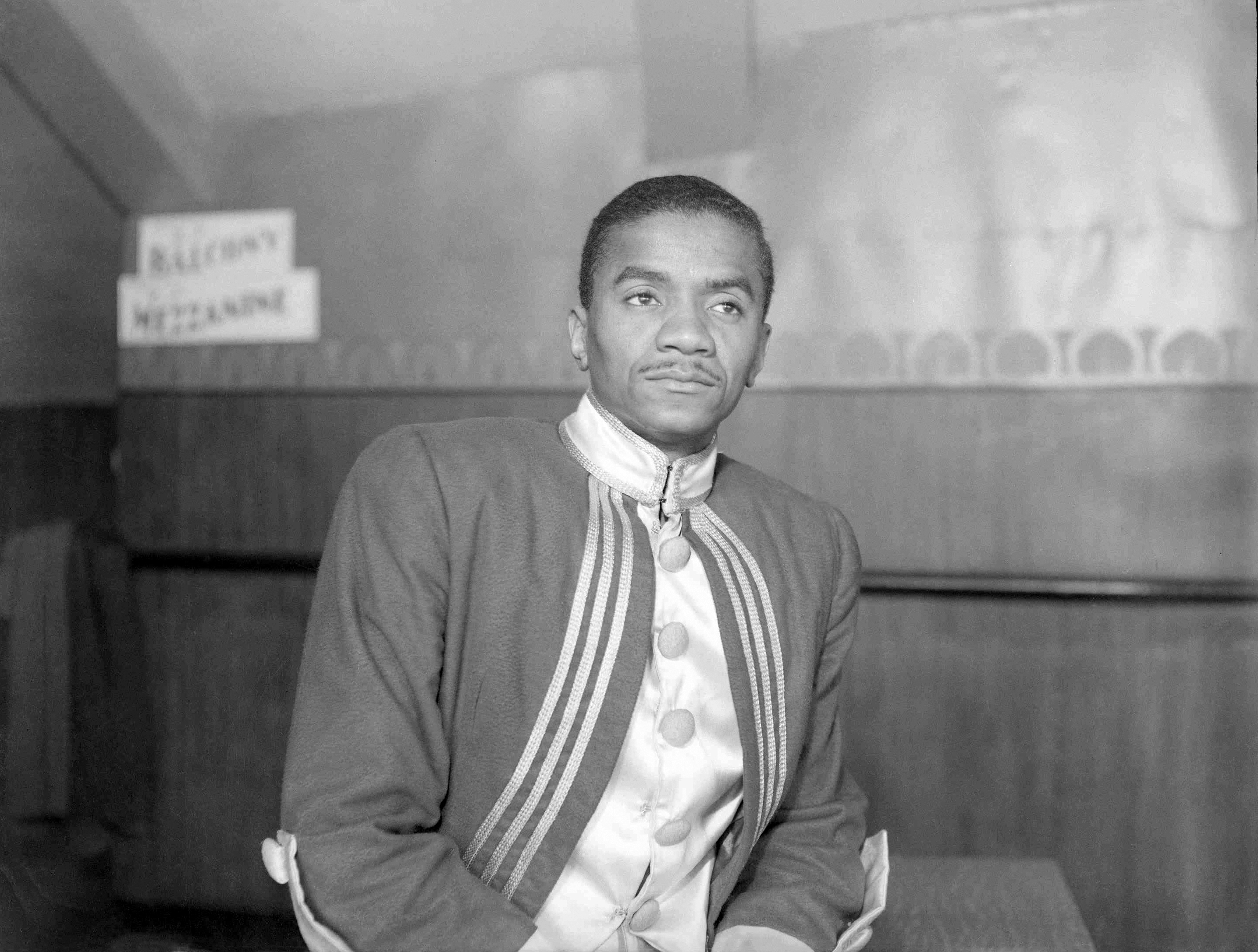
Wardell Saunders (Malcolm)

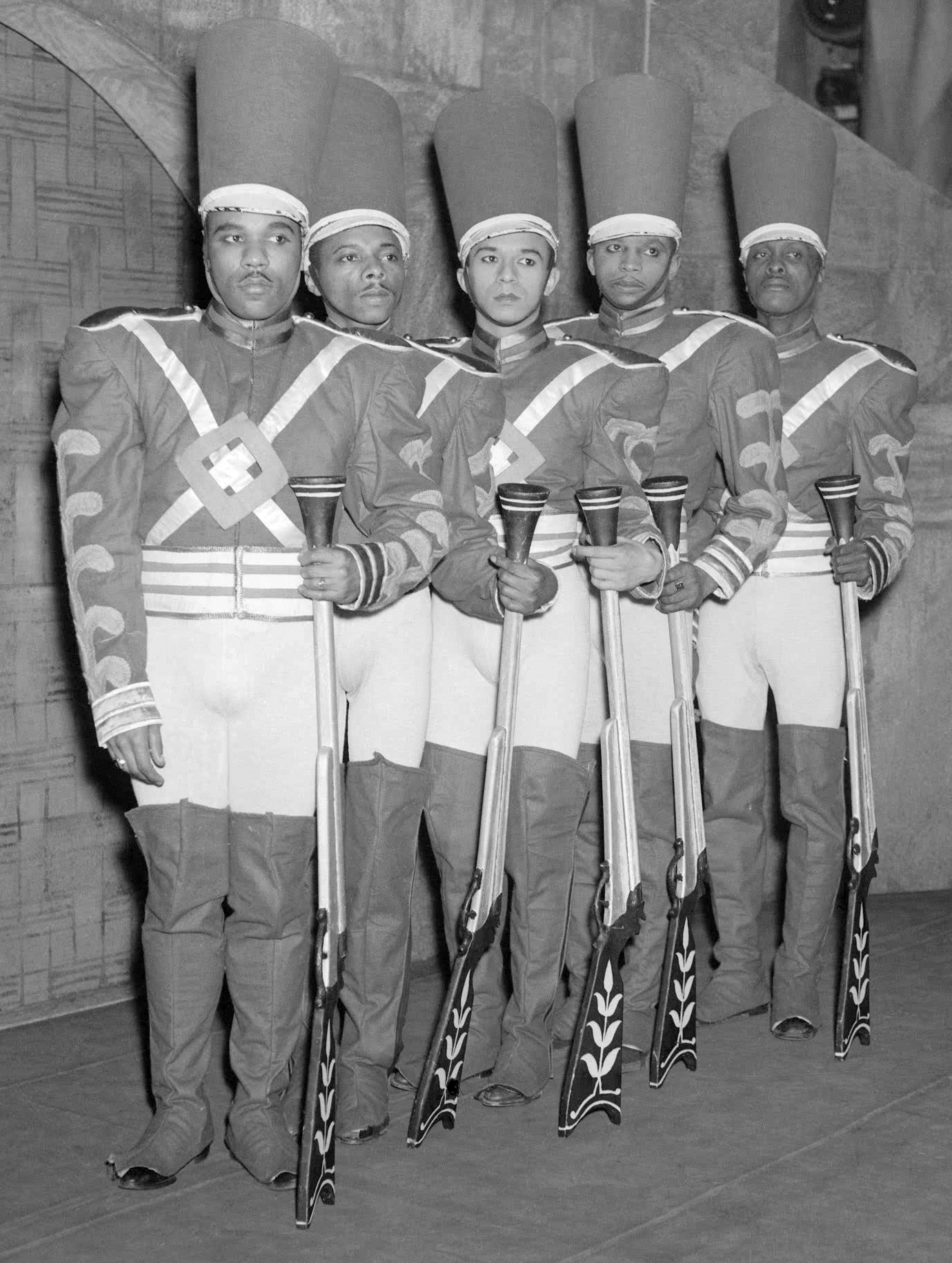
Macbeth's bodyguard

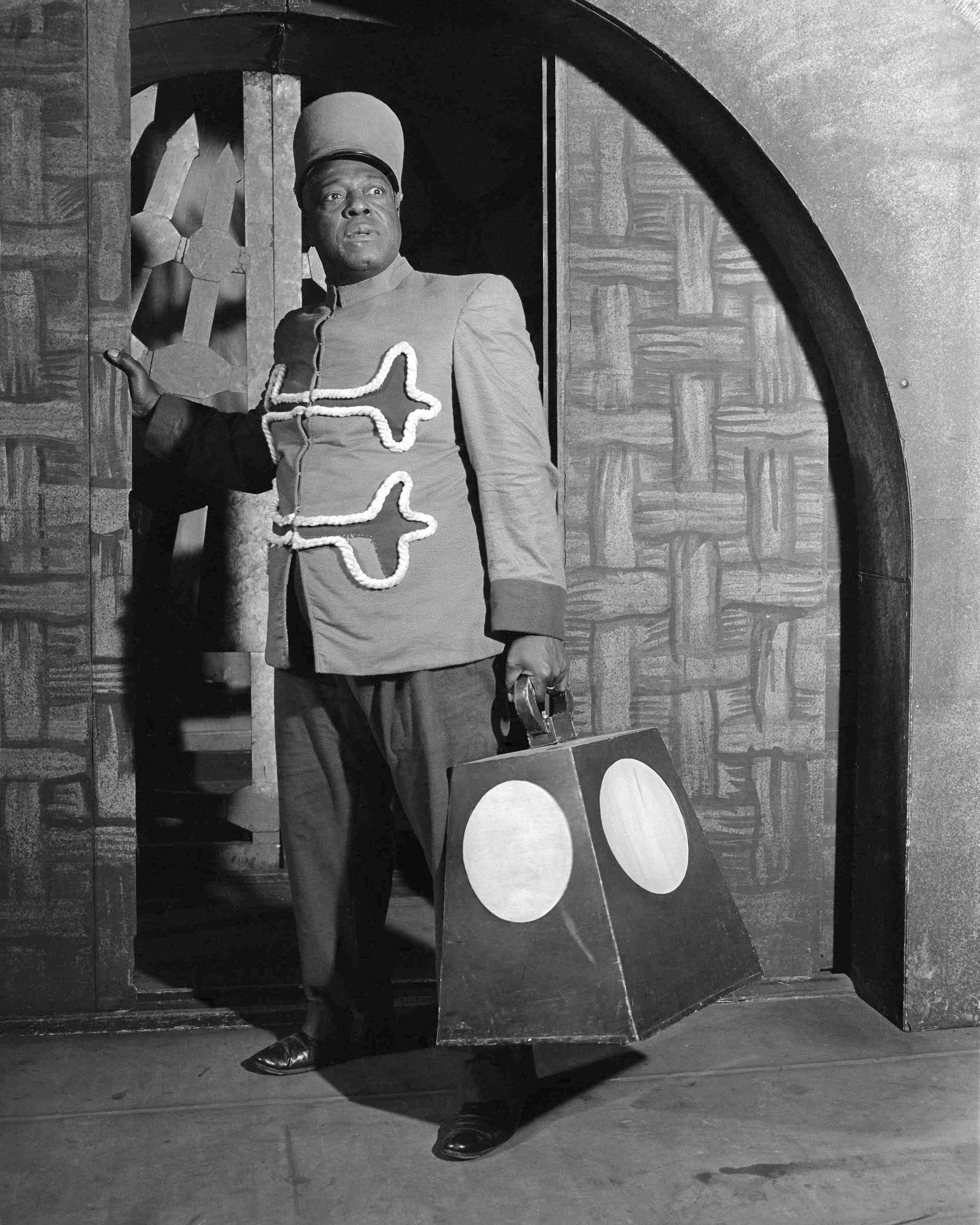
J. Lewis Johnson (The Porter)

== Revivals ==
Using the original 1936 promptbook, in 1977, the Henry Street Settlement's New Federal Theatre revived the production, starring Lex Monson and Esther Rolle.

In 2001, Lenwood Sloan created the Vo-Du Macbeth, inspired in part by the 1936 Federal Theatre production.

The National Black Arts Festival announced their plans to revive the play in 2012 in Atlanta, with funding from the National Endowment for the Arts.

The American Century Theater produced the play in 2013.

== Influence ==
In 2021, a biopic titled Voodoo Macbeth premiered at the Cleveland International Film Festival. Produced by the USC School of Cinematic Arts, it chronicles the creation of the original 1936 production, starring Inger Tudor as Rose McClendon and Jewell Wilson Bridges as Orson Welles.

In 2017, Bob Devin Jones directed a production of Voodoo Macbeth that was inspired by Welles's version. Jones' version starred Calvin M. Thompson as Macbeth and Erica Sutherlin as Lady Macbeth. The show ran from April 7th to April 23, and it was performed at Studio@620 in St. Petersburg, Florida.
