= Canada Lee =

American boxer and actor (1907–1952)

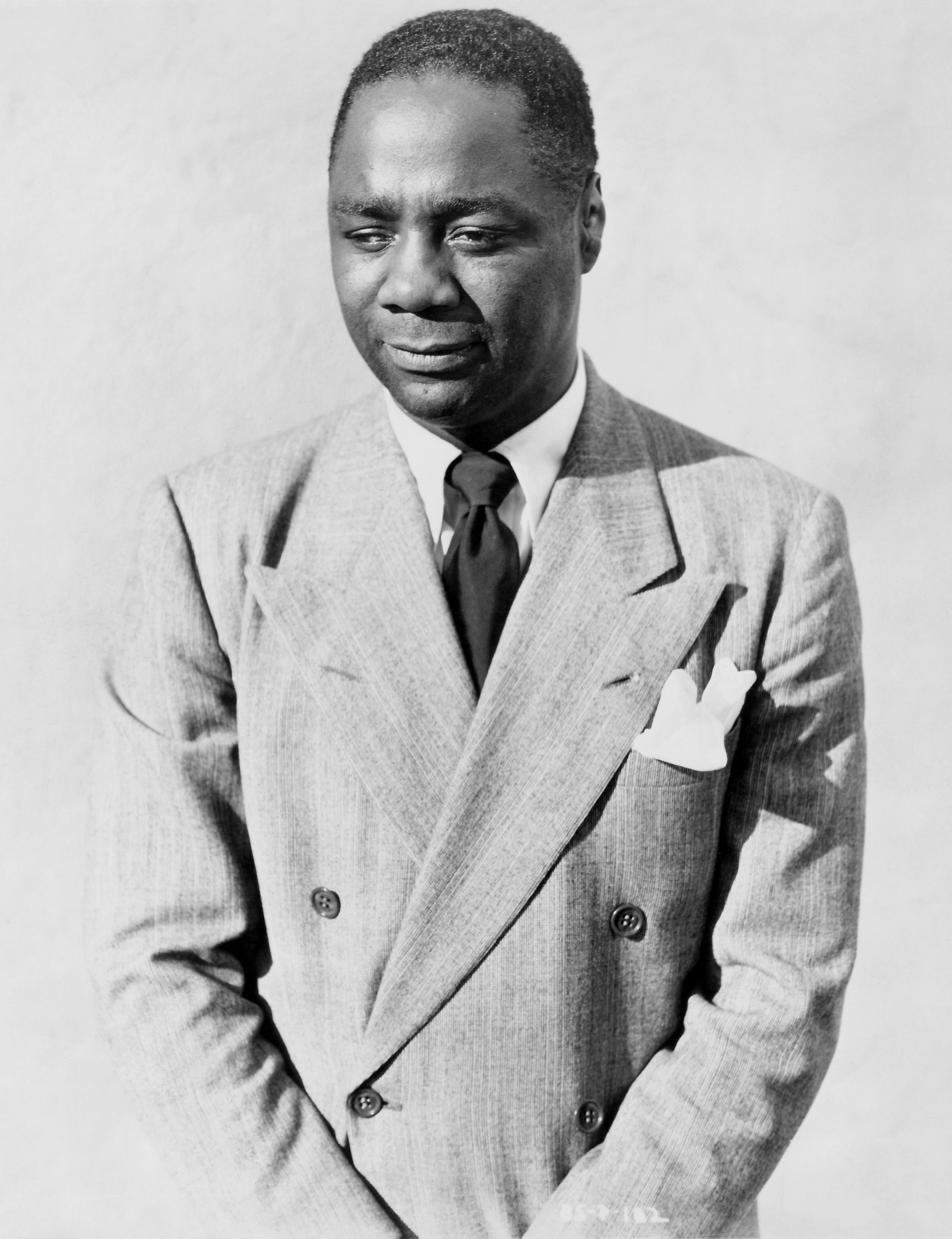
- Lee in 1948
- Born: Leonard Lionel Cornelius Canegata; March 3, 1907; New York City, New York, U.S.
- Died: May 9, 1952 (aged 45); New York City, New York, U.S.
- Other name: Lionel Canegata
- Occupation: Actor
- Years active: 1926–1952
- Spouses: Juanita Waller (1925–42); Frances Pollack (1951–52)
- Children: 2, including Carl Lee
- Boxing career
- Height: 5 ft 9 in (1.75 m)
- Weight: Welterweight
- Stance: Orthodox

Boxing record
- Total fights: 91; with the inclusion of newspaper decisions
- Wins: 42
- Win by KO: 17
- Losses: 37
- Draws: 10
- No contests: 2
- Website: canadalee.org

Leonard Lionel Cornelius Canegata (March 3, 1907 – May 9, 1952), known professionally as Canada Lee, was an American professional boxer and actor who pioneered roles for African Americans. After careers as a jockey, boxer and musician, he became an actor in the Federal Theatre Project, including the 1936 production of Macbeth adapted and directed by Orson Welles. Lee later starred in Welles's original Broadway production of Native Son (1941). A champion of civil rights in the 1930s and 1940s, Lee was blacklisted and died shortly before he was scheduled to appear before the House Un-American Activities Committee. He advanced the African-American tradition in theatre pioneered by such actors as Paul Robeson. Lee is the father of actor Carl Lee.

== Biography ==
=== Early life ===
Lee was born Leonard Lionel Cornelius Canegata on March 3, 1907, in the San Juan Hill neighborhood of Manhattan in New York City. His father, James Cornelius Lionel Canegata, was born on the Caribbean island of St. Croix, and as a youth had migrated to New York, where he married Lydia Whaley Gadsen. Raised by his parents in Harlem, Lee had an aptitude for music, and at age seven he began studying violin and piano with J. Rosamond Johnson at the Music School Settlement for Colored People. He made his concert debut at age 11, performing a student recital at Aeolian Hall. But after seven years of music studies, without explanation, he put away his violin and ran away from home. In 1921, aged 14, Lee went to Saratoga Springs, New York, and began a two-year career as a jockey.

Lee returned to his parents' home in Harlem in 1923 with no idea what he was going to do next. He considered returning to music, but an old school friend suggested that he try boxing. At one amateur match, fight announcer Joe Humphries saw the name "Canagata, Lee" on the card he was using. He tossed the card aside and instead announced "Canada Lee"—a name that Lee liked and adopted. In the amateur ring he won 90 out of 100 bouts and the national amateur lightweight title.

=== Professional boxer ===
Lee turned pro at age 19, in October 1926, and became a favorite with audiences. At 5 feet 9 inches (1.75 m) and about 144 pounds (65 kg), he fought as a welterweight. His boxing statistics vary due to incomplete coverage and record keeping for the sport in the 1920s and 1930s. Boxing historian Donald R. Koss documents Lee having 60 bouts 1927–31, the majority of them taking place 1927–28. The New York Times reported that Lee had some 200 professional matches and lost only about 25.

During his victorious 10-round bout with Andy Divodi at Madison Square Garden on December 12, 1929, Lee was dealt a blow over his right ear that detached his retina. With treatment his vision could have been saved, but Lee feared losing his successful career and masked his injury. In time he lost all sight in his right eye. He quit professional boxing in 1933.

Despite having made an estimated $90,000 during his boxing career (roughly equivalent to $2.1 million today), Lee was broke. "Just threw it away," Lee later said. Lee eventually lobbied for insurance, health care, financial consultation and retirement homes for fighters. "The average boxer possesses little education," he said in 1946. "If he winds up broke, he has no trade, no education and nobody to turn to."

As Lee's fighting career began to wind down, he put together a small dance band that played at obscure clubs. When an old friend, sportswriter Ed Sullivan, plugged him in his new entertainment column, Lee and his group began landing better engagements. His career as a bandleader peaked in 1933 when his group played at the Lafayette Theatre in Harlem. The following year he opened his own small club, The Jitterbug, which he managed to operate for six months. When it closed he had no prospects, and his mother convinced him to simply get a job.

=== Acting ===
All my life I've been on the verge of something. I'm almost becoming a concert violinist and I run away to the races. I'm almost a good jockey and I go overweight. I'm almost a champion prizefighter and my eyes go bad. Now I've got it, now I've got what I'm going to be.

— Canada Lee

Lee discovered a love for Broadway theatre during his years as a prizefighter. He remembered Show Boat as the first stage production he ever saw: "A big, tough fighter, all muscle, just sobbing," he recalled.

His acting career began by accident in 1934. While at a YMCA to apply for a job as a laborer, Lee stumbled upon an audition in progress and was recognized by playwright Augustus Smith. Lee was invited to try out, and won a supporting role in Brother Mose, directed by Frank H. Wilson. Sponsored by New York's Civil Works Administration, the show toured the boroughs, playing at community centers and city parks into the fall of the year. In October 1934, Lee succeeded Rex Ingram in the Theatre Union's revival of Stevedore, which toured to Chicago, Detroit and other U.S. cities after its run on Broadway. It was his first professional role.

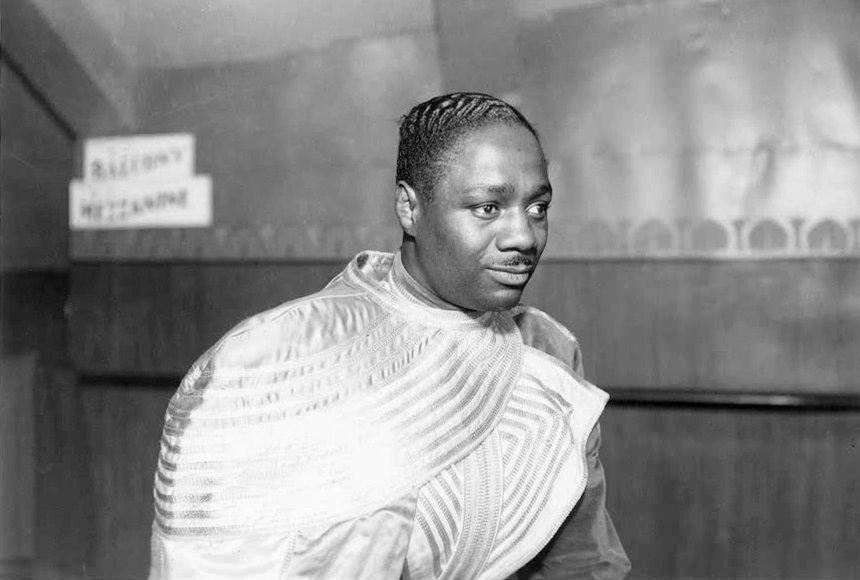
Lee as Banquo in the Federal Theatre Project production of Macbeth (1936)

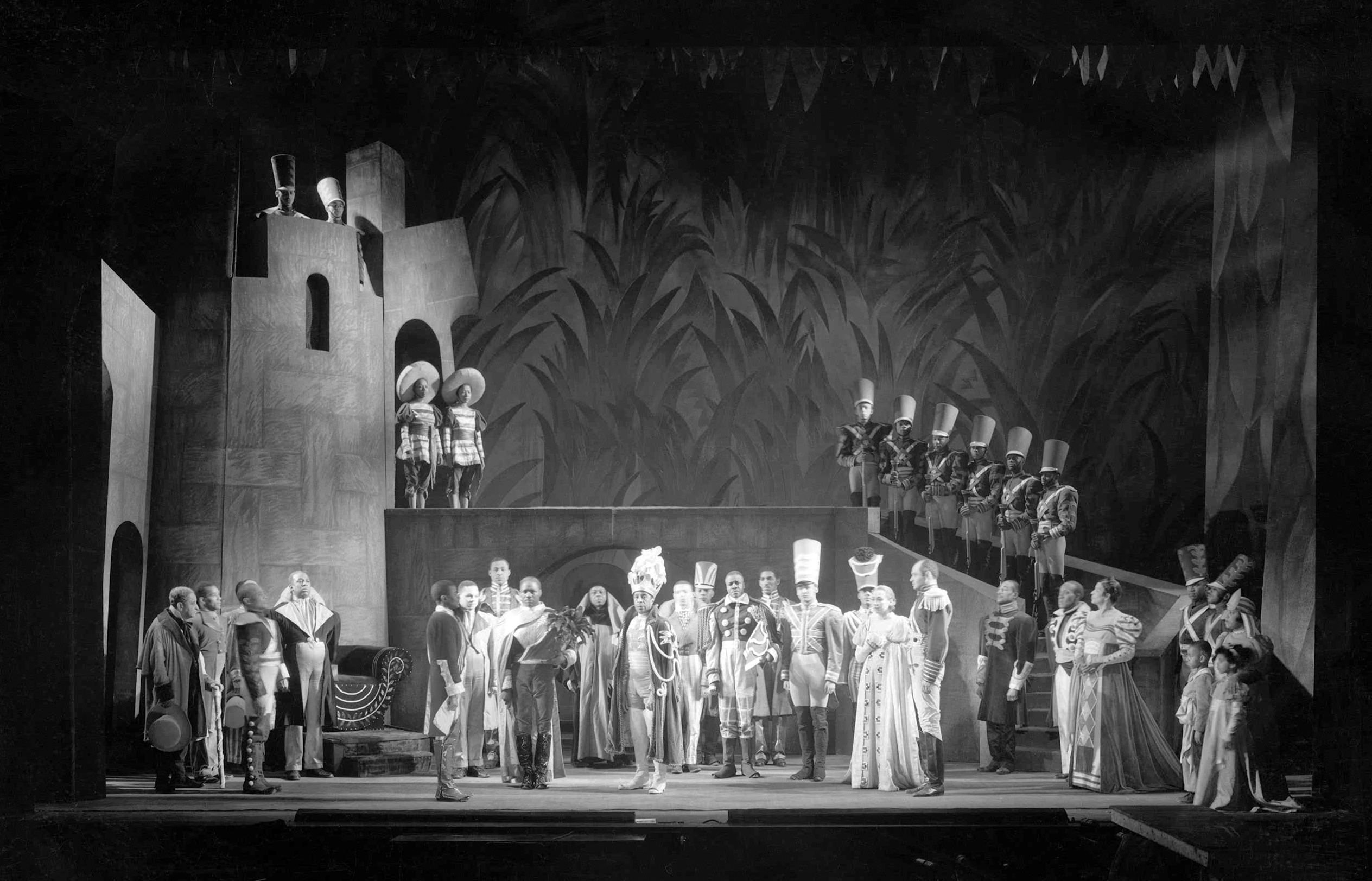
Lee (center left) as Banquo in Act I, Scene 2, of Macbeth

Lee then was cast in his first major role, Banquo, in the legendary Federal Theatre Project production of Macbeth (1936), adapted and directed by Orson Welles.

"I never would have amounted to anything in the theatre if it hadn't been for Orson Welles," Lee recalled. "The way I looked at acting, it was interesting and it was certainly better than going hungry. But I didn't have a serious approach to it until … I bumped into Orson Welles. He was putting on a Federal Theatre production of Macbeth with Negro players and, somehow, I won the part of Banquo. He rehearsed us for six solid months, but when the play finally went on before an audience, it was right—and it was a wonderful sensation, knowing it was right. Suddenly, the theatre became important to me. I had a respect for it, for what it could say. I had the ambition—I caught it from Orson Welles—to work like mad and be a convincing actor."

Macbeth was sold out for ten weeks at the Lafayette Theatre. After an additional two weeks on Broadway it toured the nation, including performances at the Texas Centennial Exposition in Dallas.

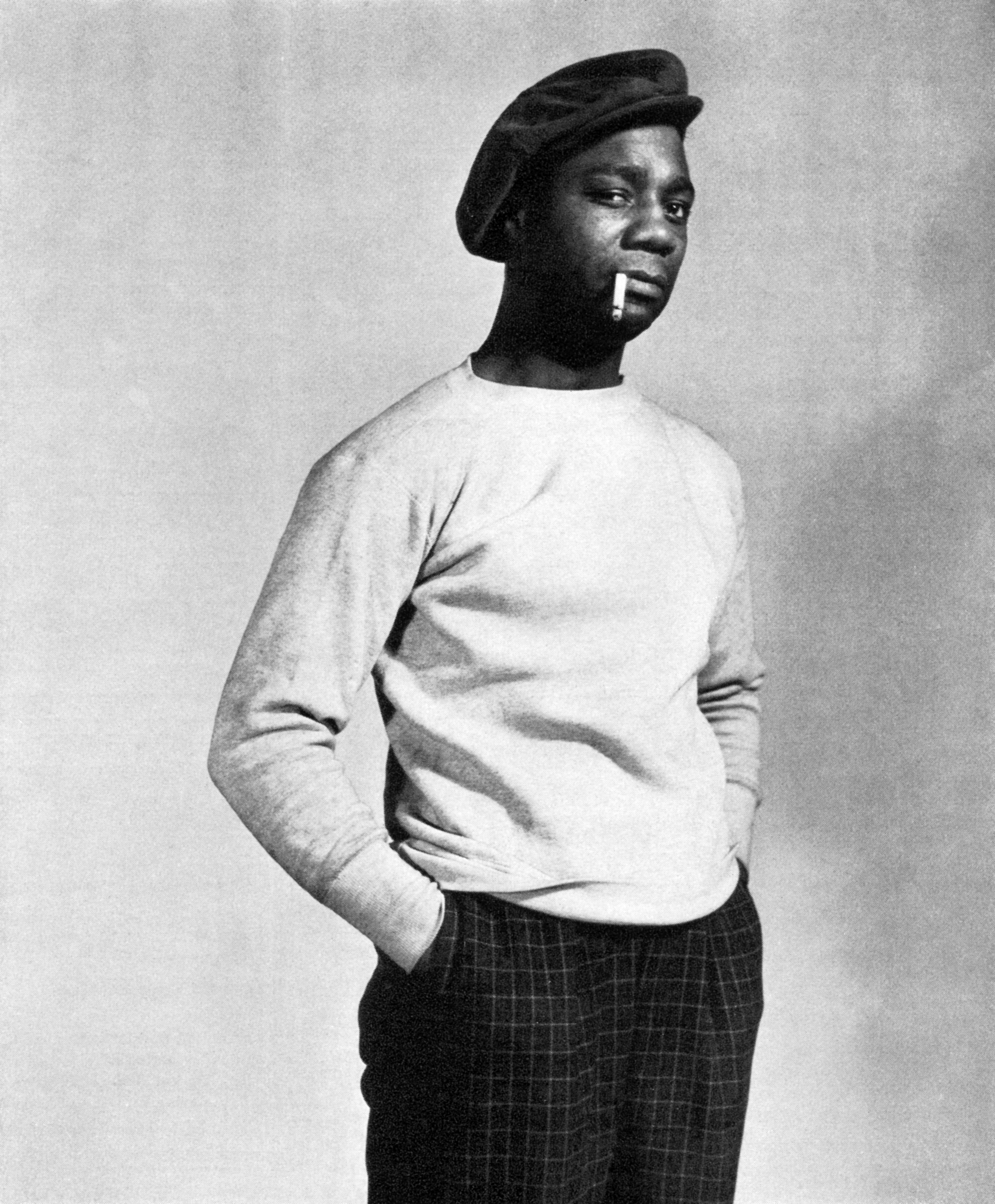
Lee as Bigger Thomas in the Mercury Theatre production of Native Son (1941)

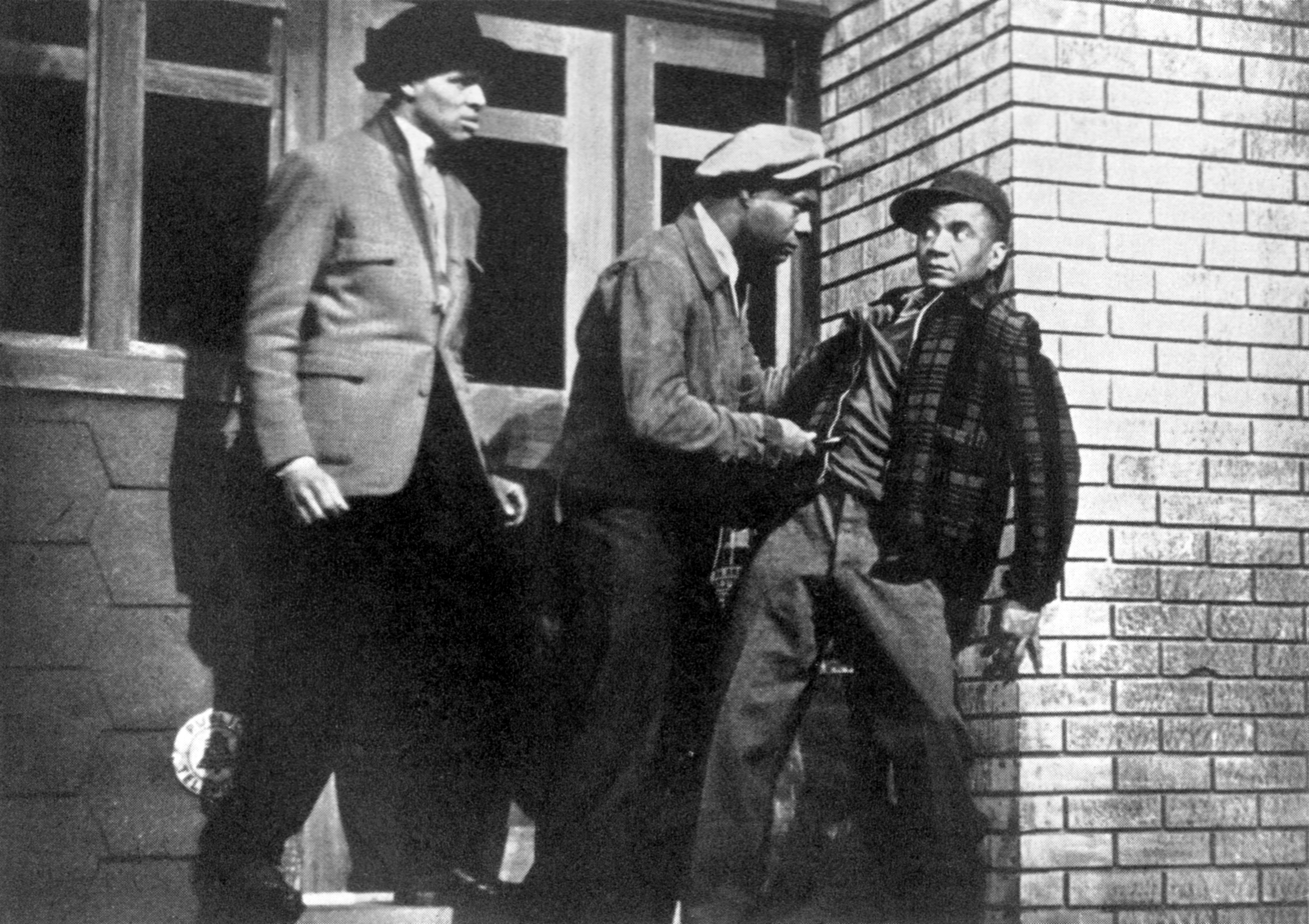
J. Flashe Riley (Jack), Lee (Bigger Thomas) and Wardell Saunders (Gus Mitchell) in Native Son

After five months in a supporting role, Lee succeeded Rex Ingram as the lead in the stage production Haiti (1938), portraying Haitian slave turned emperor Henri Christophe. One of the Federal Theatre Project's most popular productions, Haiti was seen by some 90,000 people at the Lafayette Theatre in Harlem and at Boston's Copley Theatre.

In January 1939, with the end of the Federal Theatre Project, Lee gained a role in Mamba's Daughters (based on DuBose Heyward's 1929 novel), a Broadway success that toured North America and returned to Broadway for another brief run in 1940. Lee took a break from the road tour to make his motion picture debut in Keep Punching (1939), a film about boxing. He made his radio debut as narrator of the weekly CBS jazz series Flow Gently, Sweet Rhythm (1940–41). As that regular series came to an end, he opened a restaurant at 102 West 136th Street, Canada Lee's Chicken Coop, which offered authentic South Carolina cuisine, jazz and blues. Lee kept it going despite chronic financial difficulties.

Lee played the lead role in the 1940 revival of Theodore Ward's Big White Fog. A 1938 Federal Theatre Project production, the play was remounted by the newly created Negro Playwrights Company, founded in New York by Ward, Langston Hughes, Paul Robeson, Theodore Browne, Richard Wright and Alain Locke.

Lee became a star overnight in his ultimate stage success, Native Son (1941), an adaptation of Richard Wright's novel staged on Broadway by Orson Welles. The show was a spectacular hit for both Welles and Lee, who starred in the initial New York run, a 19-month national tour, and a second run on Broadway with accessible ticket prices. "Mr. Lee's performance is superb," wrote Brooks Atkinson of The New York Times, who called him "certainly the best Negro actor of his time, as well as one of the best actors in this country." Wright also applauded the performance, noting the contrast between Lee's affable personality and his intensity as Bigger Thomas. The sympathetic portrayal of a black man driven to murder by racial hatred brought much criticism however, especially from the Catholic Diocese of Brooklyn and the Legion of Decency, and the ensuing pressure forced the play to close.

During World War II, Lee continued to act in plays and in films. In 1942, he played in two comedies by William Saroyan, and earned approving reviews despite the generally negative response to these plays. In 1943, his name was above the title on the marquee for South Pacific, a race-themed drama directed by Lee Strasberg that again was panned by critics but won Lee critical praise.

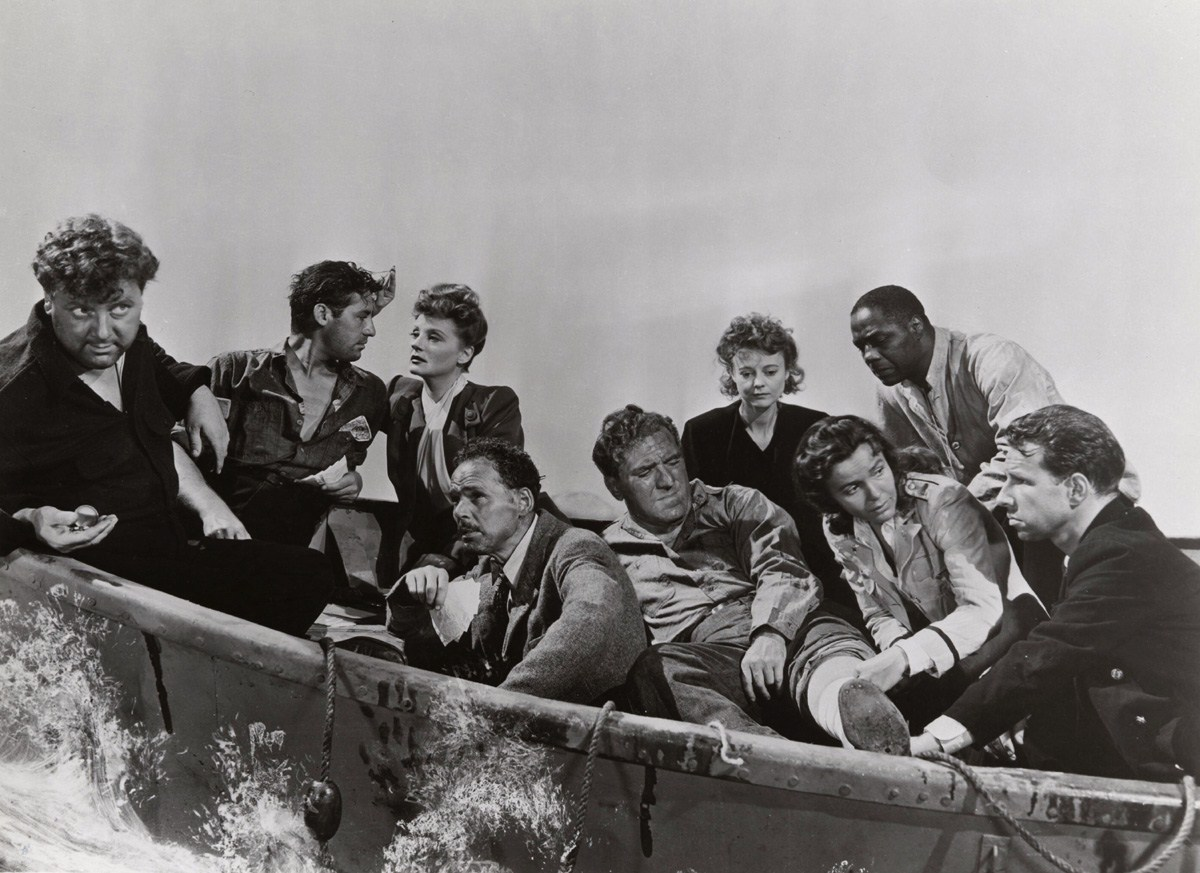
The cast of Alfred Hitchcock's Lifeboat (1944), from left: Walter Slezak, John Hodiak, Tallulah Bankhead, Henry Hull, William Bendix, Heather Angel, Mary Anderson, Canada Lee, Hume Cronyn

Perhaps Lee's best known film role was in Alfred Hitchcock's Lifeboat (1944), in which he played ship's steward Joe Spencer, one of 8 men and women who survive the sinking of the freighter carrying them from New York to London and are joined in their lifeboat by a survivor of the crew of the U-boat that destroyed their vessel.

According to a June 22, 1943, Hollywood Reporter news item, Lee was the first actor cast for the film. The script was criticized for making Joe "too stereotypical". Lee testified that he attempted to round out the character by revising dialogue, primarily eliminating repeated "yessir"s and "nossir"s that sounded subservient, and cutting some actions. An NAACP critique of the film condemned the role of Joe and praised Lee's performance. The Baltimore Afro-American's review, while commenting on the character's shortcomings, praised Lee's portrayal. Historian Rebecca Sklaroff, while writing in 2009 that Joe's role was more "tokenistic" than black roles in the wartime films Sahara and Bataan, wrote that Joe was depicted as compassionate, dependable and heroic. He is the only one who resists the impulse of mob fury that leads the other characters to kill the German. He is the only character who steps forward to disarm the wounded German sailor rescued at the end of the film.

Lee's successful radio career continued with New World A-Comin', which made its debut in March 1944. He narrated the first two seasons of the groundbreaking WMCA radio series that presented Negro history and culture to mainstream American audiences.

He became the first African American to play Caliban, in Margaret Webster's 1945 Broadway production of The Tempest. Lee had admired Shakespeare since his turn in Macbeth; indeed, at the time of his death he was preparing to play Othello on film.

In 1946, Lee played a principal role in On Whitman Avenue, a drama by Maxine Wood about racial prejudice directed by Margo Jones. Lee produced the play, making him the first African-American producer on Broadway. The play spoke directly to the need for interracial housing following World War II and won the praise of former First Lady Eleanor Roosevelt, who wrote weekly columns encouraging readers to see it.

In the autumn of 1946, Lee made American theatre history when he portrayed the villain Daniel de Bosola in John Webster's The Duchess of Malfi. Presented in Boston and on Broadway, the production marked the first time a black actor had played a white role on the stage. Lee wore a special white paste that had been used medically, to cover burns and marks, but had never before been used in the theatre. He had a supporting role in Robert Rossen's Body and Soul (1947), another boxing picture.

In 1948, Lee played his last stage role, that of a devoted slave in Set My People Free, Dorothy Heyward's drama based on the aborted 1822 slave revolt led by Denmark Vesey.

In 1949, he took a supporting role in Lost Boundaries, a drama based on William Lindsay White's book of the same title, a nonfiction account of Dr. Albert C. Johnston and his family, who passed for white while living in New England in the 1930s and 1940s.

Lee's last film appearance was the starring role of minister Stephen Kumalo in Cry, the Beloved Country (1951).

=== Civil rights activism ===
As an actor, Lee came into contact with many of the leading progressive figures in the country. Langston Hughes, for instance, wrote two brief plays for Lee; these were submitted to the Theater Project, but their criticism of racism in America was deemed too controversial, and neither was staged. Lee spoke to schools, sponsored various humanitarian events, and began speaking directly against the existing segregation in America's armed forces, while simultaneously acknowledging the need to win World War II. To this latter end, he appeared at numerous USO events; he won an award from the United States Recruiting Office and another from the Treasury Department for his help in selling war bonds. These sentiments would carry on throughout his life, culminating in his early firsthand account of apartheid in South Africa.

Lee was an early influence on physician and human rights activist H. Jack Geiger. They met in 1940 when Geiger, a 14-year-old middle-class Jewish runaway, was backstage at a Broadway production of Native Son. Lee agreed to take Geiger in when he showed up at his door in Harlem asking for a place to stay. With the consent of his parents, Geiger stayed with Lee for over a year. Lee took on the role of surrogate father and introduced Geiger to Langston Hughes, Billy Strayhorn, Richard Wright, and Adam Clayton Powell. Geiger eventually became a journalist, then a doctor who co-founded the first community health center in the United States, Columbia Point Health Center in Dorchester, Massachusetts. He became a founder of Physicians for Social Responsibility and Physicians for Human Rights, and established community health centers in Mississippi and South Africa. Geiger says he would never have moved so deeply in these worlds so quickly if not for his experiences with Canada Lee.

By the late 1940s, the rising tide of anti-communism had made many of Lee's earlier contacts politically dangerous. In 1949, the trade journal Variety stated that under no circumstance was Lee to be used in American Tobacco's televised production of a radio play he had recently starred in because he was "too controversial".

The same year, the FBI offered to clear Lee's name if he would publicly call Paul Robeson a communist. Lee refused and responded by saying, "All you're trying to do is split my race." According to newspaper columnist Walter Winchell, Lee stated that he intended to come out and "publicly blast Paul Robeson." However, the fact that the friendship between the two actors remained until Lee's death suggests that Robeson put no faith in Winchell's claim.

At the height of the Hollywood blacklist, Lee managed to find work in 1950 as the star of a British film Cry, The Beloved Country, for which both he and Sidney Poitier were smuggled into South Africa as indentured servants in order to play their roles as African ministers. During filming, Lee had his first heart attack, and he never fully recovered his health. The film's message of universal brotherhood stands as Lee's final work towards this aim.

Being on the Hollywood blacklist prevented him from gaining further work. Scheduled to appear in Italy to begin production on a filmed version of Othello, he was repeatedly notified that his passport "remained under review". Lee was reportedly to star as Bigger Thomas in the Argentine version of Native Son but was replaced in the role by Richard Wright, author of the novel, when Lee had to withdraw.

=== Family life ===
In December 1925, Lee married Juanita Eugenia Waller. On November 22, 1926, they had a son, Carl Vincent Canegata, who became actor Carl Lee. The couple separated while their son was young, and they were amicably divorced in 1942.

In 1934, Lee began a love affair with publisher and peace activist Caresse Crosby, despite the threat of miscegenation laws. They often had lunch in uptown New York in Harlem at the then-new restaurant "Franks", where they could maintain their secret relationship. When Lee was performing in Washington, D.C., during the 1940s, the only restaurant in the city where they could eat together was an African restaurant named the Bugazi. Crosby and Lee's intimate relationship continued into the mid-1940s.

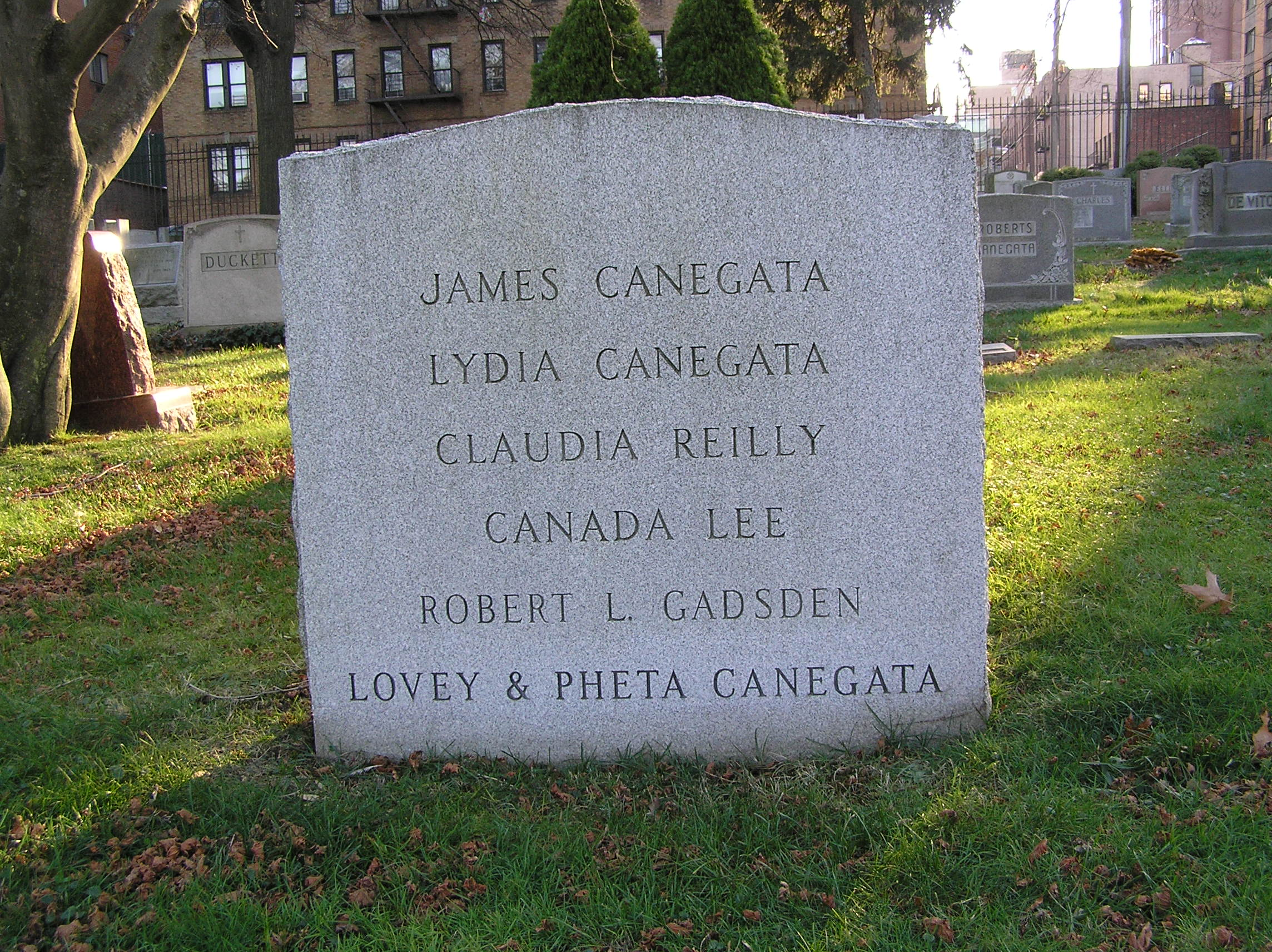
Lee's grave at Woodlawn Cemetery

In March 1951, Lee married Frances Pollack. They remained together until he died just over a year later.

=== Death ===
Lee died of a reported heart attack at the age of 45 on May 9, 1952, in Manhattan. It was later revealed by his widow, Frances Pollack, that he had been diagnosed with uremia and died of kidney disease, slipping into a coma and dying 10 days after his diagnosis. He was buried at Woodlawn Cemetery in The Bronx.

== Theatre credits ==
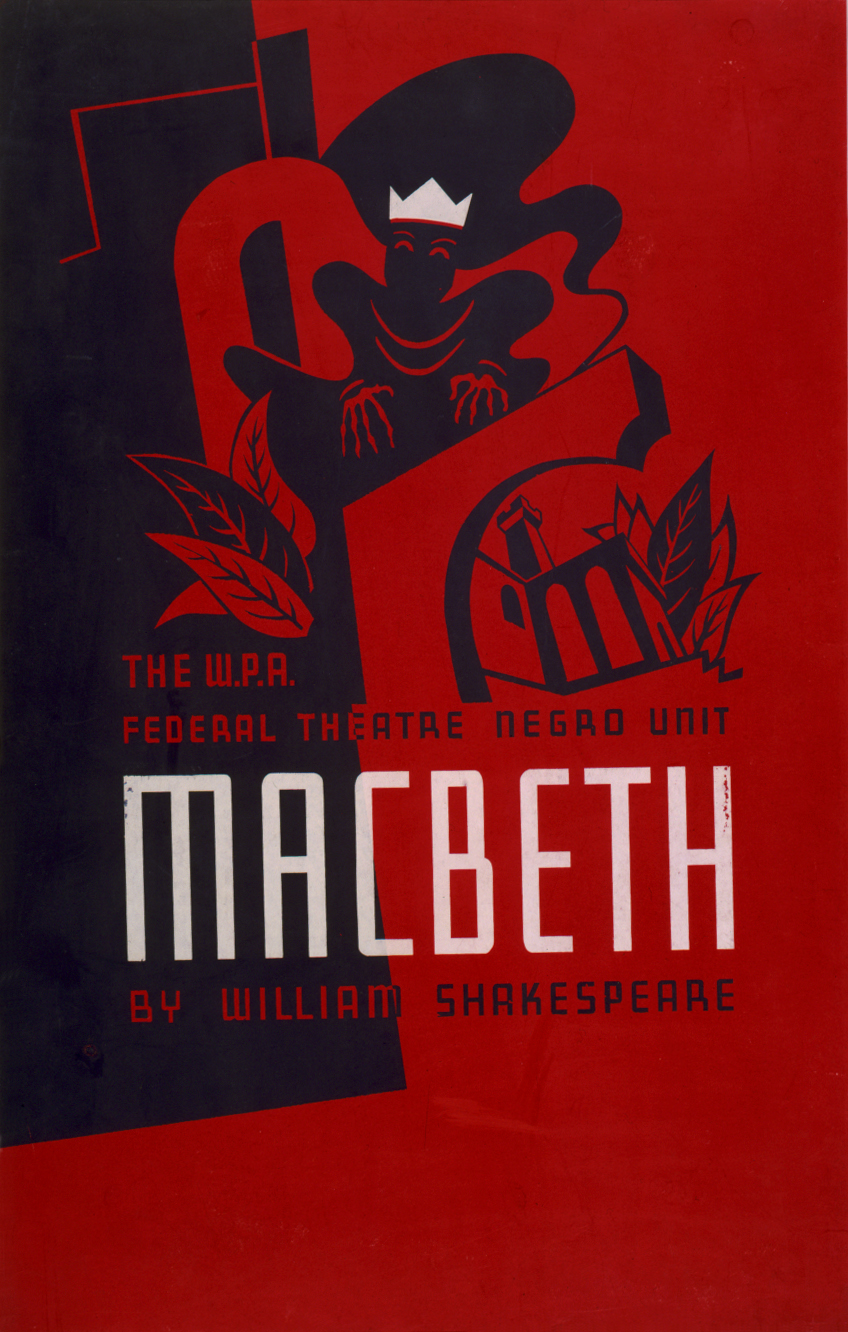
Poster for Macbeth (1936)

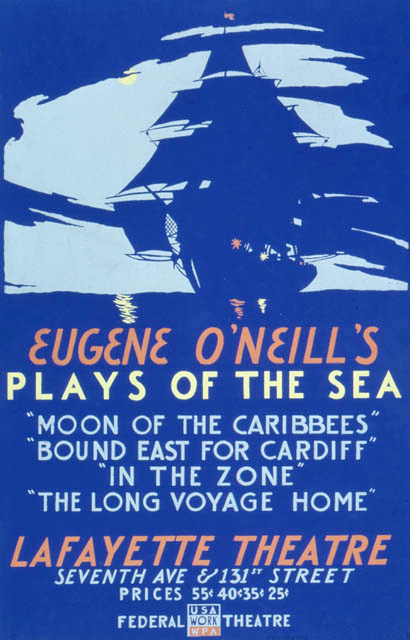
Lee appeared in two of the four one-act plays comprising Eugene O'Neill's S.S. Glencairn cycle (1937)

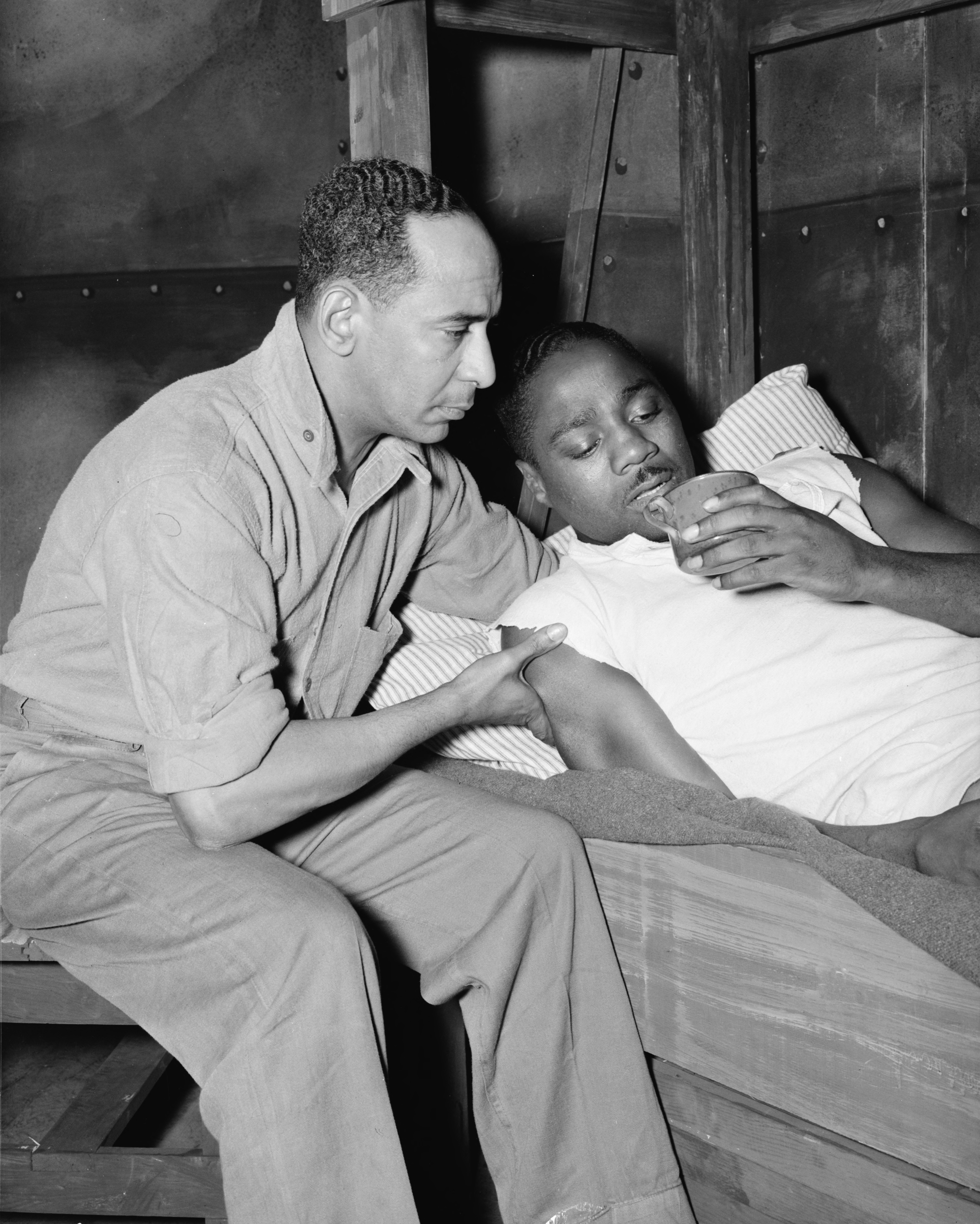
Driscoll (Lionel Monagas) comforts the dying Yank (Canada Lee) in the Federal Theatre Project revival of Eugene O'Neill's Bound East for Cardiff, comprised in the production One-Act Plays of the Sea (1937)

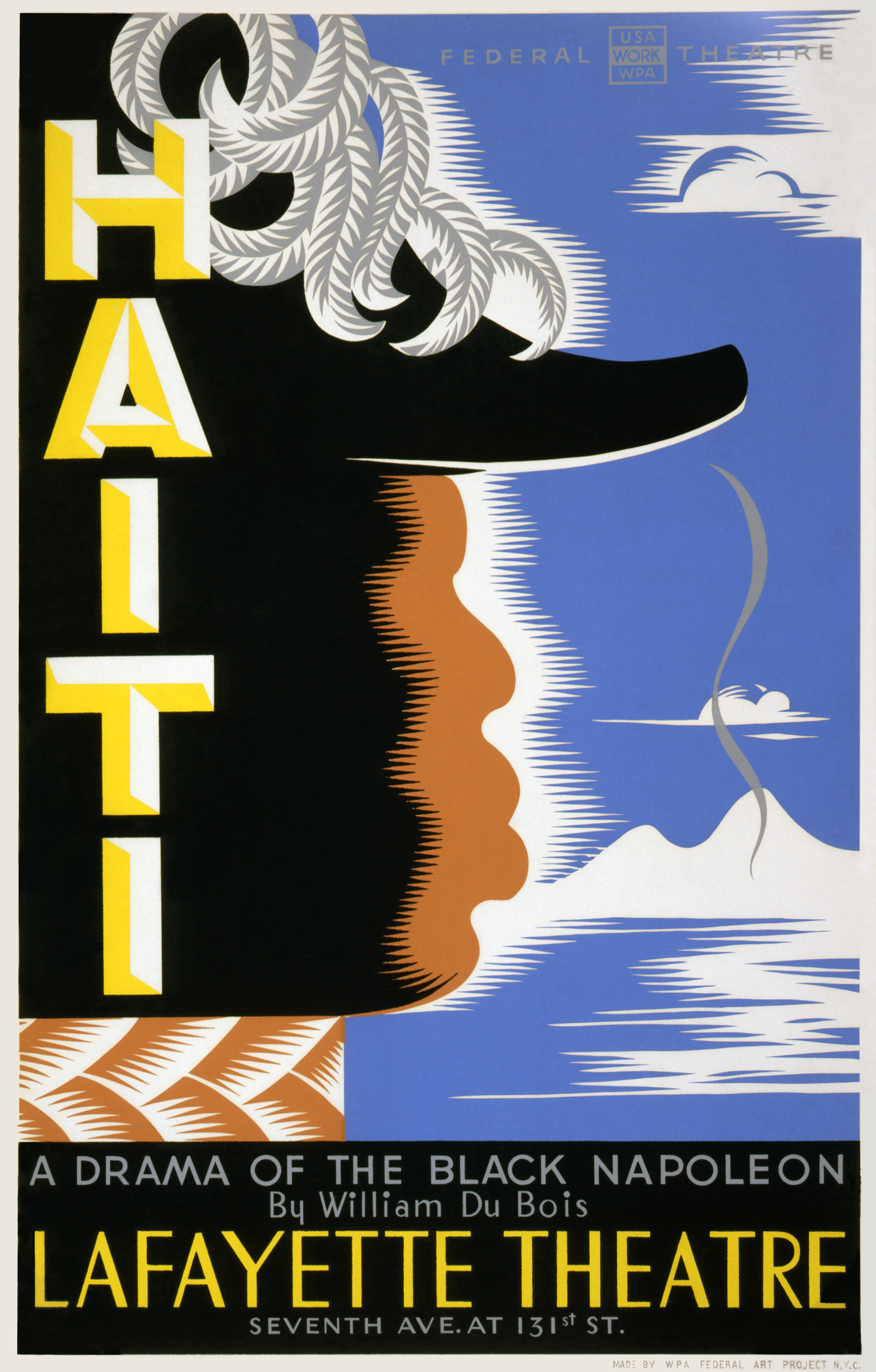
Poster for Haiti (1938)

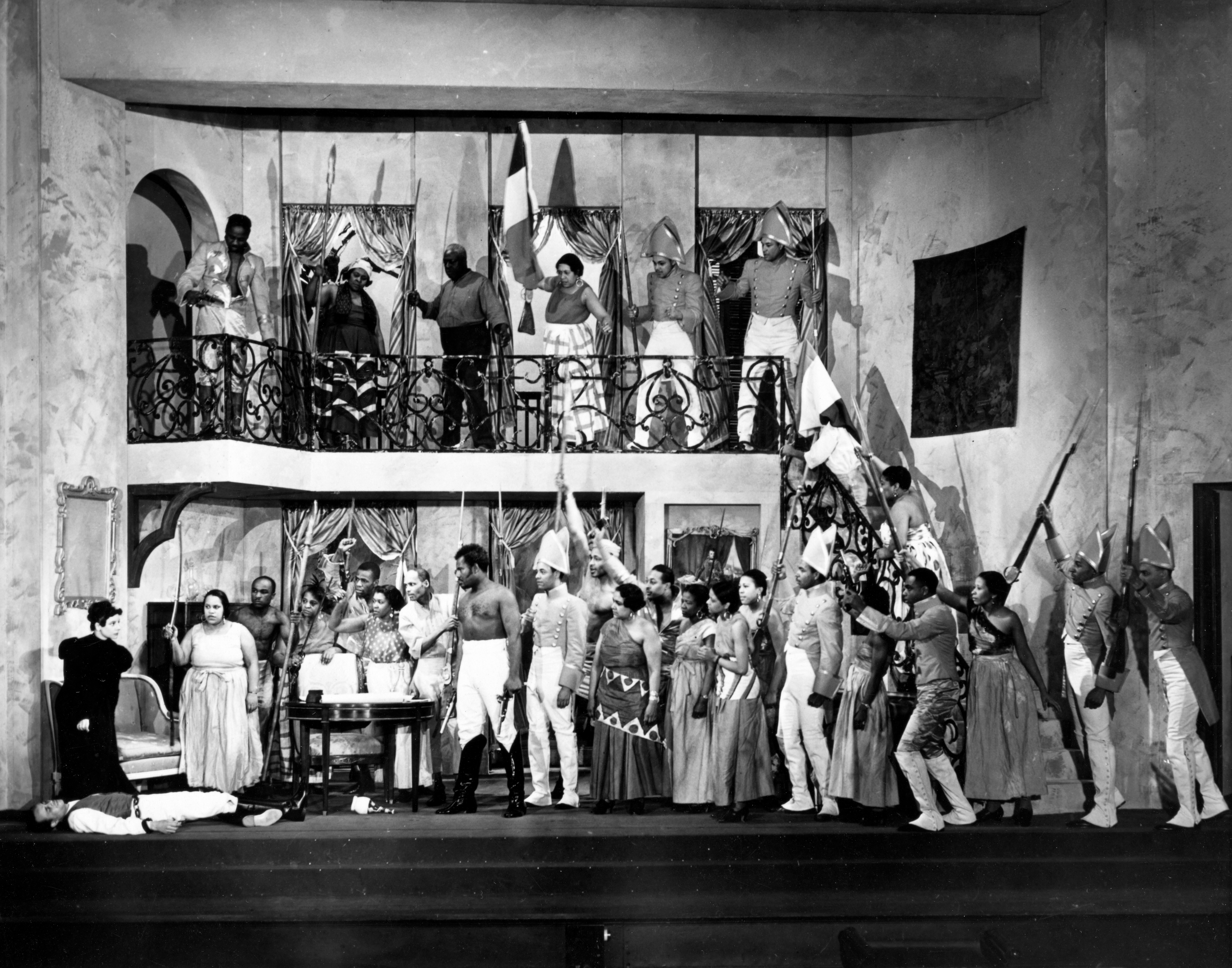
Lee (upper row left) as Bertram in Haiti (1938)

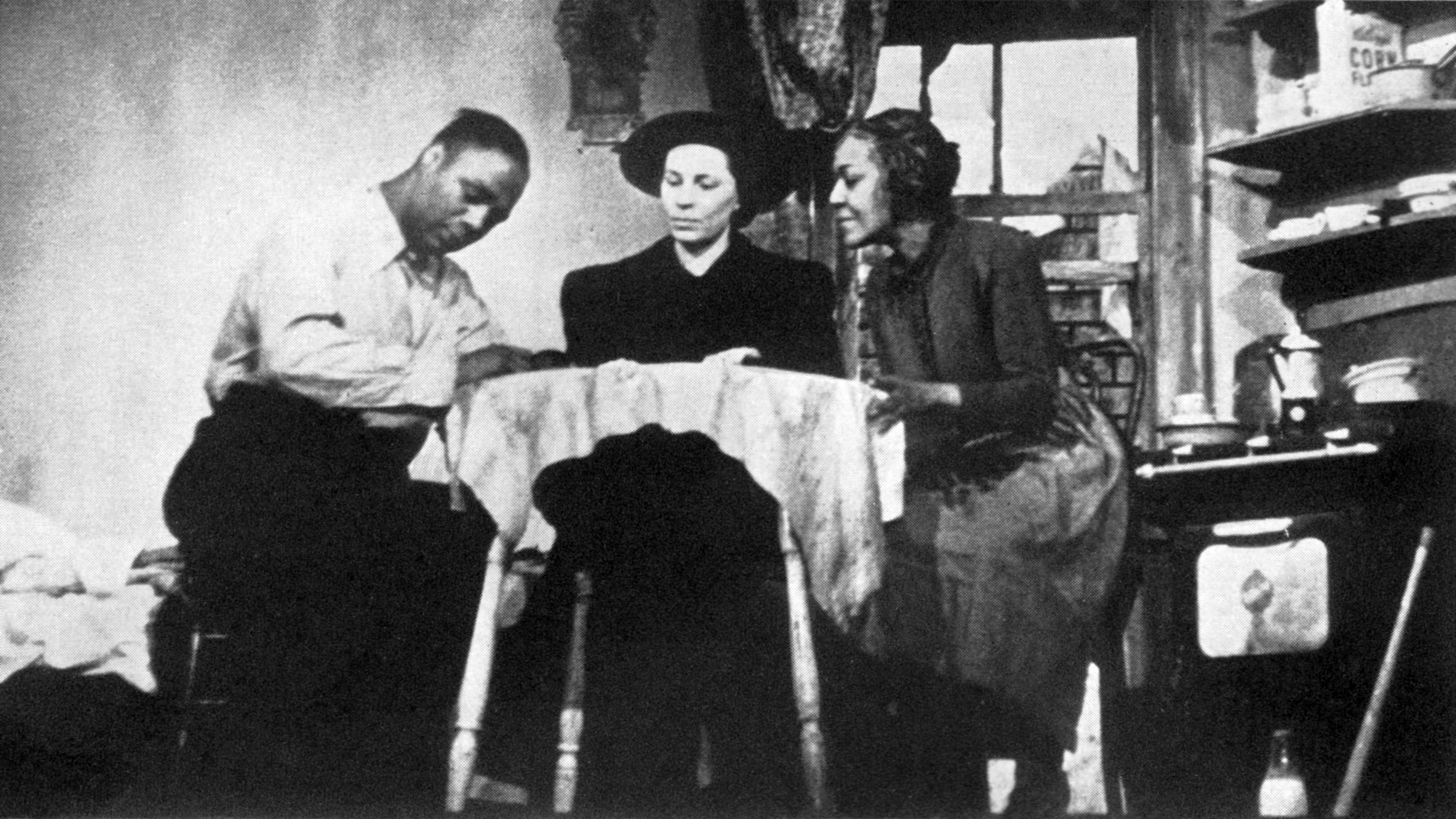
Canada Lee (Bigger Thomas), Eileen Burns (Miss Emmet) and Evelyn Ellis (Hannah Thomas) in Native Son (1941)

Date	Title	Role	Notes
1934	Brother Mose	Nathan	Debut; tour of New York City boroughs under the Civil Works Administration and Federal Emergency Relief Administration
October 1 – November 1934	Stevedore	Blacksnake	Civic Repertory Theatre, New York
? – Spring 1935	Stevedore	Blacksnake	Tour of U.S. cities including Chicago and Detroit
May 3 – May 1935	Sailor, Beware!	Herb Marley	Lafayette Theatre, Harlem, New York
April 12, 1936	Macbeth	Banquo	Lafayette Theatre, Harlem, New York; A free preview draws 3,000 more people than can be seated
April 14 – June 20, 1936	Macbeth	Banquo	Lafayette Theatre, Harlem, New York; Sold out for all ten weeks
July 6–18, 1936	Macbeth	Banquo	Adelphi Theatre, New York
July 21–25, 1936	Macbeth	Banquo	Park Theatre, Bridgeport, Connecticut
July 28 – August 1, 1936	Macbeth	Banquo	Hartford, Connecticut
August 6–?, 1936	Macbeth	Banquo	Exhibit Theatre, Dallas, Texas
August 13–23, 1936	Macbeth	Banquo	Amphitheater, Texas Centennial Exposition, Dallas, Texas; Integrated seating was a unique experience for theatergoers in Dallas
August 25–29, 1936	Macbeth	Banquo	Keith's Theatre, Indianapolis, Indiana
September 1–13, 1936	Macbeth	Banquo	Great Northern Theater, Chicago, Illinois
September 1936	Macbeth	Banquo	Detroit, Michigan
September 1936	Macbeth	Banquo	Cleveland, Ohio
September 23–25, 1936	Macbeth	Banquo	Civic University, Syracuse, New York
October 6–17, 1936	Macbeth	Banquo	Majestic Theatre, Brooklyn, New York
October 29, 1937 – January 15, 1938	One-Act Plays of the Sea	Yank	Lee appears in two of the four one-act plays in the Glencairn cycle: The Moon of the Caribbees and Bound East for Cardiff; Lafayette Theatre, Harlem, New York
December 2–4, 1937	Brown Sugar	Henry	Biltmore Theatre, New York
March 2 – August 7, 1938	Haiti	Bertram	Lafayette Theatre, Harlem, New York
August 9 – September 24, 1938	Haiti	Henri Christophe	Lafayette Theatre, Harlem, New York
October 24 – November 5, 1938	Haiti	Henri Christophe	Copley Theatre, Boston, Massachusetts
January 3 – May 1939	Mamba's Daughters	Drayton	Empire Theatre, New York
September 1939 – ?	Mamba's Daughters	Drayton	Tour of U.S. cities including Detroit, Toronto, Chicago and St. Louis
March 23 – April 6, 1940	Mamba's Daughters	Drayton	Broadway Theatre, New York
October 22 – December 14, 1940	Big White Fog	Victor Mason	Lincoln Theatre, Harlem, New York
March 24 – June 28, 1941	Native Son	Bigger Thomas	St. James Theatre, New York
July–August 1941	Native Son	Bigger Thomas	Tour of New York City boroughs
September 1941 – April 1942	Native Son	Bigger Thomas	National tour to cities including Boston, Baltimore, Detroit, Chicago, St. Louis, Cleveland, Minneapolis, St. Paul, Madison, Milwaukee, Toronto, Rochester, Philadelphia and Pittsburgh
August 17–22, 1942	Across the Board on Tomorrow Morning	Thomas Piper	Belasco Theatre, New York
August 17–22, 1942	Talking to You	Blackstone Boulevard	Belasco Theatre, New York
October 23, 1942–January 2, 1943	Native Son	Bigger Thomas	Majestic Theatre, New York
December 29, 1943 – January 1, 1944	South Pacific	Sam Johnson	Cort Theatre, New York
August 30 – October 1944	Anna Lucasta	Danny	Mansfield Theatre, New York
January 25 – April 21, 1945	The Tempest	Caliban	Alvin Theatre, New York (January 25 – March 17); Broadway Theatre, New York (March 19 – April 21)
May 8 – September 14, 1946	On Whitman Avenue	David Bennett	Cort Theatre, New York
September 23 – ?, 1946	The Duchess of Malfi	Daniel de Bosola	Shubert Theatre, Boston
October 15 – November 16, 1946	The Duchess of Malfi	Daniel de Bosola	Ethel Barrymore Theatre, New York
July 1948	Othello	Othello	Week long production in Boston also starred Clare Luce and Wesley Addy.
November 3–27, 1948	Set My People Free	George	Hudson Theatre, New York
July 1949	Anna Lucasta	Danny	Two-week revival at the Apollo Theater, Harlem
Summer 1949	Native Son	Bigger Thomas	Crest Theater, Long Beach, New York
March 6, 1952	NAACP fundraising show	Himself	Madison Square Garden, New York

== Film and television credits ==
Henry Browne, Farmer (1942)

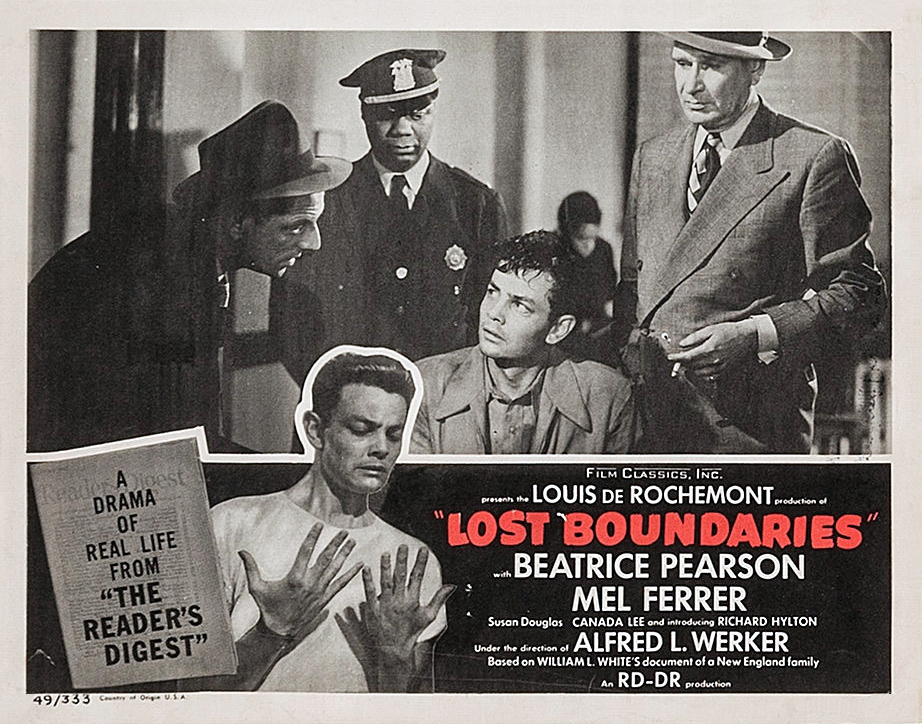
Lobby card for Lost Boundaries (1949)

Year	Title	Role	Notes
1939	Keep Punching	Speedy	
1942	Henry Browne, Farmer	Narrator	Oscar-nominated documentary short
1944	Lifeboat	Joe Spencer	
1945	Ask the OPA	Narrator	Documentary short about the Office of Price Administration
1947	Body and Soul	Ben Chaplin	
1947	The Roosevelt Story	Narrator (Joe, the voice of the Depression)	Documentary biography of Franklin D. Roosevelt
1949	Lost Boundaries	Lt. Thompson	
1950	The Chevrolet Tele-Theatre (TV series)	Unknown; Police Officer	"The Final Bell" "Oropalo"
1951	Cry, the Beloved Country	Stephen Kumalo	
1952	American Inventory	George Washington Carver	Episode titled "Biography Book" aired by NBC on April 13, 1952. This also featured his son, billed as Canada Lee Jr, playing a student at Tuskegee Institute.

== Radio credits ==
Date	Title	Notes
April 7, 1940 – January 12, 1941	Flow Gently, Sweet Rhythm	Weekly 30-minute CBS Radio jazz series also called The John Kirby Show; Cast: Canada Lee (narrator), John Kirby, Charlie Shavers, Russ Procope, Buster Bailey, Billy Kyle, O'Neil Spencer, Maxine Sullivan, Ella Fitzgerald
April 13, 1941	The Free Company	"A Start in Life"; Cast: Canada Lee, Luis Van Rooten, Georgette Harvey, Edna Mae Harris
May 11, 1941	Those Who Have Made Good	Clifford Burdette interviews Canada Lee, subject of the first episode of the series
June 9, 1941	Salute to Canada Lee	Nationwide Mutual Network program that concludes with Canada Lee and Ray Collins performing the last scene from Native Son; Cast: Paul Robeson (emcee), Eddie Anderson, Ray Collins, Duke Ellington, Canada Lee, Hattie McDaniel, Bill Robinson, Richard Wright
1942	Freedom's People	"Contributions to the Theatre", final episode of an eight-part series sponsored by the U.S. Office of Education; Cast: Canada Lee, Carol Bright, Maurice Ellis (narrator)
February 8, 1944	Words at War	"George Washington Carver"; Cast: Fredric March, Canada Lee
March 5, 1944	New World A-Comin'	First episode in a weekly WMCA series written by Roi Ottley, based on his 1943 book Cast: Canada Lee (narrator), Muriel Smith
March 12, 1944	New World A-Comin'	"The Negro: Fascism and Democracy"; Cast: Canada Lee, Muriel Smith (singing "When The Lights Go On Again All Over The World"), Ralph Bell, Will Geer
March 19, 1944	New World A-Comin'	"The Negro in Early America"; new series theme song by Duke Ellington; Cast: Canada Lee, Muriel Smith, Leigh Whipper, Will Geer, Ralph Bell, John Ireland, Alexander Scourby
March 26, 1944	New World A-Comin'	"The Negro in Entertainment"; Cast: Canada Lee, Hazel Scott, Bill Wirges, Hester Sondergaard, Ralph Bell
April 2, 1944	New World A-Comin'	"Ghettos"; Cast: Canada Lee, Ethel Everett, Hilda Ottley, Humphrey Davis, Ken Reynard, Leigh Whipper, Martin Wolfson, Muriel Smith, Ralph Bell, Richard Huey
April 9, 1944	New World A-Comin'	"The Negro and Health"; Cast: Canada Lee, Ethel Everett, Hilda Ottley, James Fuller, Joseph Julian, Martin Wolfson, Ralph Bell, Andrew Pendleton
April 16, 1944	New World A-Comin'	"The Story of Negro Humor", adapted from Langston Hughes' "White Folks Do Some Funny Things"; Cast: Canada Lee, Clarence Foster, David Kerman, Grace Rogrers, Leigh Whipper, Martin Wolfson, Maxine Sullivan, Andrew Pendleton
April 23, 1944	New World A-Comin'	"The Story Behind the Headline in the Negro Press"; Cast: Canada Lee, Gordon Heath, Grace Rogers, Hilda Ottley, Martin Wolfson, Ralph Bell
April 25, 1944	Columbia Presents Corwin	"Dorie Got a Medal", Norman Corwin's biographical ballad about Doris Miller; Cast: Canada Lee, Josh White, Mary Lou Williams, Laura Duncan, Jim Backus
April 30, 1944	New World A-Comin'	"The Story of the Negro Church in New York"; Cast: Maurice Ellis (narrator), Canada Lee, Hilda Ottley, Ralph Bell, Randolph Eckles, Betty Berghart, Bill Lipton, Sanford Bickart
May 14, 1944	New World A-Comin'	"The Colored Orphan Asylum"; Cast: Canada Lee (narrator), Ethel Everett, Laurina Scott, Hilda Ottley, Jimmy Wright, Ralph Bell, Alexander Scourby, Eugene Boyd, Doris Black
May 21, 1944	New World A-Comin'	"The Story of James Pearson"; Cast: Canada Lee (narrator), Joseph Julian, Ralph Bell, Martin Wolfson, Norman Rose, Betty Berghart, Randolph Eckles, Michael Everett, Sanford Bickart, Eric Roberts
May 28, 1944	New World A-Comin'	"The Story of Ted Morgan, a Negro Reporter"; Cast: Maurice Ellis (narrator), Canada Lee, Hilda Ottley, Ralph Bell, Randolph Eckles, Betty Berghart, Bill Lipton, Sanford Bickart, John Velasco
June 4, 1944	New World A-Comin'	"Life in the Ghetto"; Cast: Dr. Algernon Black (guest speaker), Canada Lee, Algernon Blackwood, Betty Berghart, Fred Carter, Grace Rogers, Howard Smith, Jimmy Wright, Ken Reynard, McKeeter Anderson, Sanford Bickart
June 18, 1944	New World A-Comin'	"The Mammy Legend"; Cast: Canada Lee, Eric Roberts, Ethel Everett, Georgette Harvey, Lurene Scott, Ralph Bell, Sanford Bickart
June 25, 1944	New World A-Comin'	"The Story of Negro Music" (last show of the first season); Cast: Canada Lee (narrator), Billie Holiday, Slam Stewart, Josh White, Charlie Shavers, The Hall Johnson Choir, Art Tatum, Ben Webster, Benny Morton, Roy Eldridge, Vic Dickenson, Edmond Hall, Arthur Trappe, Al Casey
October 22, 1944	New World A-Comin'	"The Vermont Experiment" (first show of the second season); Cast: Canada Lee (narrator), Lurene Scott, Joyce Michael, Frederick O'Neal, Daniel Whittaker, Ronald Liss, Humphrey Davis, Richard Coogan, Paula Bowersmith
November 12, 1944	New World A-Comin'	"Inside Harlem Hospitals"; Cast: Canada Lee, Celeste Holm, Muriel Smith, Hilda Simms
November 19, 1944	New World A-Comin'	"The Life and Music of W. C. Handy"; Cast: Canada Lee, John Kirby and His Orchestra, Josh White, Leigh Whipper
November 26, 1944	New World A-Comin'	"Parachutes for Democracy"; Cast: Canada Lee, Alan Devitt, Andrew Pendleton, Frederick O'Neal, Harry Davis, Isabel Martin, Jerry Shears, Joseph Boland, Richard Coogan, Sanford Bickart
1944	Treasury Briefs	"Sixth War Loan Talks"; Cast: Canada Lee
1944?	Treasury Star Parade	"I Got Wings", drama about the first black pilots in the Air Force; Cast: Canada Lee
January 28, 1945	New World A-Comin'	"Roll Call"; Cast: Canada Lee, Myron McCormick
February 4, 1945	New World A-Comin'	"There are Things to Do"; Cast: Canada Lee, Miriam Hopkins
February 8, 1945	The American School of the Air	"Dr. George Washington Carver, Scientist"; Cast: Carl Van Doren (host), Canada Lee
February 11, 1945	New World A-Comin'	"They Knew Lincoln"; Cast: Canada Lee, Frank Wilson (narrator), Georgia Burke, Richard Coogan, Sanford Bickart, Walter Mosley
April 1, 1945	New World A-Comin'	"The Negro in Early America"; Cast: Canada Lee, Charles Perry, Don Gibson, Fred Carter, Georgia Burke, Hilda Simms, Jerry Shears, John Adair, Sanford Bickart (narrator), Will Geer
April 15, 1945	New World A-Comin'	Tribute to the late President Franklin D. Roosevelt; Cast: Canada Lee (reading FDR's famous D-Day prayer), U.S. Rep. Adam Clayton Powell Jr. (presenting a eulogy), Channing Tobias, Muriel Smith, Sheldon Hale Bishop, William Franklin
April 22, 1945	New World A-Comin'	"The Story of Negro Nurses"; Cast: Anne Burr, Canada Lee, Charles Perry, Don Gibson, Fred Carter, Georgia Burke, Hilda Simms, Jack Gordon, Jerry Shears, John Adair
April 29, 1945	New World A-Comin'	"Report from the Front"; Cast: Canada Lee, Charles Perry, Don Gibson, Fred Carter, Frederick O'Neal, Jerry Shears, John Adair, Paul Mann
May 20, 1945	New World A-Comin'	"The Meaning of V-E Day to Negroes"; Cast: Oliver Harrington, Canada Lee, Portia White
May 27, 1945	New World A-Comin'	"The Wind at My Back" (end of season one); Cast: Canada Lee, Juano Hernandez
July 17, 1945	The Green Pastures	Transcribed for BBC broadcast Cast: Daniel L. Haynes, Oscar Polk, Georgette Harvey, Amanda Randolph, Edna Thomas, Viola Dean, Canada Lee, Maurice Ellis, Kenneth Spencer, Fred O'Neal, Alvin Childress, Juano Hernandez
November 11, 1945	Theatre Guild on the Air	"The Emperor Jones"; Cast: Canada Lee (The Emperor)
1945	Two Men on a Raft	National USO–YMCA race relations program about two men lost at sea who must depend on each other Cast: Raymond Massey, Canada Lee
1946	Lest We Forget: These Brave Americans	"The Story of George Washington Carver"; Cast: Juano Hernandez, Canada Lee
May 31, 1947	This Is Jazz	Cast: Rudi Blesh (host), Wild Bill Davison, Albert Nicholas, Joe Sullivan, Pops Foster, Danny Barker, Baby Dodds, Canada Lee, Blue Lou Barker
December 23, 1947	A Music Version of "A Christmas Carol"	Cast: Canada Lee, Sarah Fussell, Jack Lazar, Artie Malvin, Barry Thompson (narrator), Abby Lewis, Janet Tyler, Tommy Anderson
1947	Lest We Forget: The American Dream	"The Story of the Carolina Kid"; Cast: Canada Lee
April 16, 1948	The Colgate Sports Newsreel	Cast: Bill Stern (host), Canada Lee
December 5, 1948	You Are There	"The Execution of Maximillian"; Cast: Canada Lee, Don Hollenbeck, Ned Calmer, Quincy Howe, Richard C. Hottelet, Art Hannes, Ken Roberts, Guy Sorel, Michael Ingram, Elspeth Eric, Harold Huber, William Podmore, Ann Shephard, Roc Rogers, Bert Cowlan
January 2, 1949	You Are There	"The Surrender of Sitting Bull"; Cast: Karl Swenson, John Daly, Ken Roberts, Don Hollenbeck, Peter Hobbs, Julian Noa, Crazy Bull, Canada Lee, Raymond Edward Johnson
January 23, 1949	You Are There	"The Betrayal of Toussaint L'Ouverture"; Cast: George Coulouris, Canada Lee, Joe DeSantis, Guy Sorel, John Daly, Don Hollenbeck, Quincy Howe, Ken Roberts, Richard Newton
February 21, 1949	Turning Points	"Savior of the South", biography of George Washington Carver; Cast: Canada Lee
April 10, 1949	You Are There	"Peary's Dash to the North Pole"; Cast: Eric Dressler, Canada Lee, Staats Cotsworth, Matt Crowley, John Daly, Ned Calmer, Marie Ahnighito Peary, Cliff Carpenter, Joseph Conway, John Merlin, Guy Sorel
May 1, 1949	You Are There	"Montezuma and the Spaniards"; Cast: Arnold Moss, Canada Lee, Don Hollenbeck, Douglas Edwards, Inge Adams, Joe DeSantis, John Daly, Ken Roberts (announcer), Luis Van Rooten, Quincy Howe
June 8, 1949	The Big Story	Investigating the case of Jamie Goodwin, sentenced to 40 years for a murder he didn't commit Cast: Robert Sloane (narrator), Canada Lee
June 12, 1949	You Are There	"Caesar Crosses the Rubicon"; Cast: Art Hannes, Canada Lee, Douglas Edwards, Guy Sorel, John Daly, Malcolm Keen, Ned Calmer, Quincy Howe, Staats Cotsworth, Torin Thatcher
September 23, 1949	The Barry Gray Show	Canada Lee is interviewed and discusses the blacklist
