= Raymond Gallois-Montbrun =

French composer

- Born: 15 August 1918; Saigon, Vietnam
- Died: 13 August 1994 (aged 75); Paris, France
- Education: Conservatoire de Paris
- Occupations: Violinist and Composer
- Notable work: Japan, Danger de mort (1947), Cry, the Beloved Country (1951)

Raymond Gallois-Montbrun (15 August 1918, Saigon – 13 August 1994, Paris) was a French violinist and composer. He was the director of the Conservatoire de Paris from 1962 to 1984.

He studied violin and composition at the Conservatoire de Paris, and won the Prix de Rome in 1944.

His works include a violin concerto and the symphony Japan, as well as film scores, such as Danger de mort (1947) and Cry, the Beloved Country (1951).
