= Mamba's Daughters =

1929 novel by DuBose Heyward

- Author: DuBose Heyward
- Language: English
- Publication date: 1929

Mamba's Daughters (ISBN 1570030421) is a 1929 novel written by DuBose Heyward and published by the University of South Carolina Press. It was later adapted by Heward and his wife Dorothy Heyward for the stage; the play premiered on Broadway in 1939.

== Novel ==
The book is set in the early 20th century, following three different families in scenes of deception and social transformation. The book also explores racial boundaries during that period of the 20th century. It received positive reviews, with the Georgia Historical Quarterly commenting that it provided "a unique perspective not only of Charleston's racial tensions, but also of the unique subculture shared by Charleston's elite whites and poorer blacks".

Mamba's Daughters was translated into French (1932) and Dutch (1939). The Literary Guild of America published a special edition of the novel in the United States in February 1929. The novel features illustrations by Harold Van Schmidt.

== Stage adaptation ==
The novel was adapted for the stage by Heyward and his wife Dorothy Heyward, with songs by Jerome Kern; it premiered on Broadway at the Empire Theatre on January 3, 1939, starring Ethel Waters, for whom the Heywards wrote the adaptation, and José Ferrer, and directed by Guthrie McClintic. It initially ran for 162 performances, closing on May 20, 1939. After a run in Chicago, the production had a return engagement the following year to the Broadway Theatre, running for 17 performances, from March 23, 1940, to April 6, 1940. Perry Watkins, the scenic designer, was the first African-American to design a Broadway show. Producer and theatre critic Rita Hassan was his assistant scenic designer for Mamba's Daughters.

=== Original cast ===
- Ethel Waters – Hagar
- Anne Brown – Gardenia
- Willie Bryant – Gilley Bluton
- Georgia Burke – Eva
- Helen Dowdy – Willie May
- José Ferrer – St. Julien DeC. Wentworth
- Georgette Harvey – Mamba (Hagar's mother)
- Alberta Hunter – Dolly
- J. Rosamond Johnson – The Reverend Quintus Whaley
- Canada Lee – Drayton
- Harry Mestayer – The Judge
- Fredi Washington – Lissa
- Jimmy Wright – Tony

=== Broadcast and revivals ===
Waters was the first African-American to star in a television show, The Ethel Waters Show, which was first broadcast on NBC on June 14, 1939; it included a dramatic sequence from the play, along with two actresses from the stage production, Harvey and Washington.

The first revival played at Here theatre, produced by the Target Margin Theatre in New York City in 1998, directed by David Herskovits.
