= Porgy (novel) =

1925 novel by DuBose Heyward

- Modern Library edition 1934
- Author: DuBose Heyward
- Language: English
- Publication date: 1925
- Publication place: United States

Porgy is a novel written by the American author DuBose Heyward and published by the George H. Doran Company in 1925.

The novel tells the story of Porgy, a disabled street beggar living in the black tenements of Charleston, South Carolina, in the 1920s. The character was based on Charlestonian Samuel Smalls. In some of the novel's passages, black characters speak in Gullah, a creole language that had developed among enslaved African Americans during the slavery years on the Sea Islands.

The novel was adapted for a 1927 play of the same name by Heyward and his wife, playwright Dorothy Heyward. Even before completing the play, Heyward was in discussions with composer George Gershwin for an operatic version of his novel. This was produced in 1935 as Porgy and Bess.
