= Brown Sugar (play) =

Brown Sugar is a melodrama in three acts and seven scenes by Mrs. Bernie Angus. It premiered on Broadway at the Biltmore Theatre on December 2, 1937, in a production directed and produced by George Abbott. It used sets designed by Cirker & Robbins and costumes designed by Helene Pons.

Written by a white woman, it is set in Harlem and featured what was billed as an all-black cast. While the cast was praised for its performances, Angus was criticized for having an unfocused plot with too many ideas that presented a "tourist's idea of Harlem" which was widely panned in the American press. However, The Brooklyn Eagle gave a favorable review of the show during its pre-Broadway run at Brooklyn's Majestic Theatre in November 1937. Some of the cast members included Butterfly McQueen as Lucille, Eric Burroughs as Musken, Alvin Childress as Slim, Ruby Elzy as Sarah, Georgette Harvey as Lily May, Juano Hernandez as Sam, and Canada Lee as Henry.
