= Native Son (play) =

1941 Broadway drama by Paul Green and Richard Wright

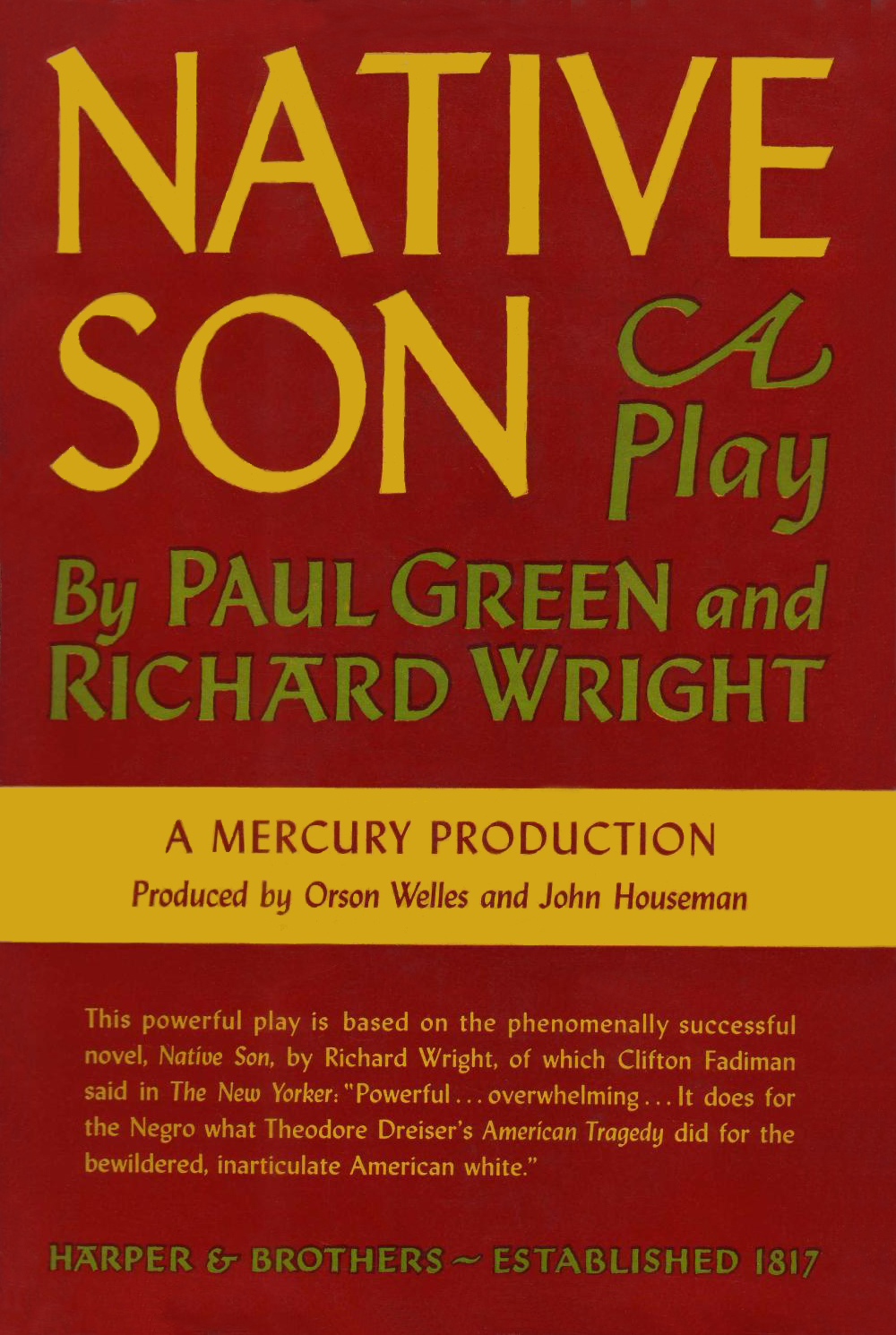
- First edition 1941
- Written by: Paul Green; Richard Wright
- Original language: English
- Genre: Drama
- Setting: Chicago, Illinois

Premiere
- Date premiered: March 24, 1941
- Place premiered: St. James Theatre; New York City, New York

Native Son is a 1941 Broadway drama written by Paul Green and Richard Wright based on Wright's novel Native Son. It was produced by Orson Welles and John Houseman, with Bern Bernard as associate producer, and directed by Welles with scenic design by John Morcom. It ran for 114 performances from March 24, 1941 to June 28, 1941 at the St. James Theatre.

This is the last time Welles and Houseman, co-founders of the Mercury Theatre, ever worked together.

== Synopsis ==
In Chicago's South Side during the 1930's, 20-year-old Bigger Thomas struggles to realize his dreams in a world that has shut him out. After taking a job in a wealthy white man's house, Bigger unwittingly unleashes a series of events that violently seal his fate.

== Differences in plot ==
Richard Wright and Paul Green edited Native Son's plot to fit the time constraints of a play more easily. Certain parts are edited or cut completely. In the novel, the daughter of Bigger Thomas's employers, Mary, has a communist boyfriend, Jan, whom Bigger tries to blame for Mary's murder. Bigger even tries to collect ransom for Mary's supposedly missing body. He also becomes the Daltons' chauffeur only after a failed robbery attempt of a white man's store. In the drama, these details are erased. It becomes simpler and more objective—Bigger becomes the Daltons' chauffeur because of a social worker. He kills Mary by accident, as in the book, but is shortly found after a manhunt through Chicago.

Green's original script called for Bigger to become devoutly religious at the end of the story, a theme not present in the novel; Wright helped Houseman remove this aspect and did not inform Green. Houseman believed that the religion twist went against Wright's viewpoint.

== Production ==
=== Cast ===
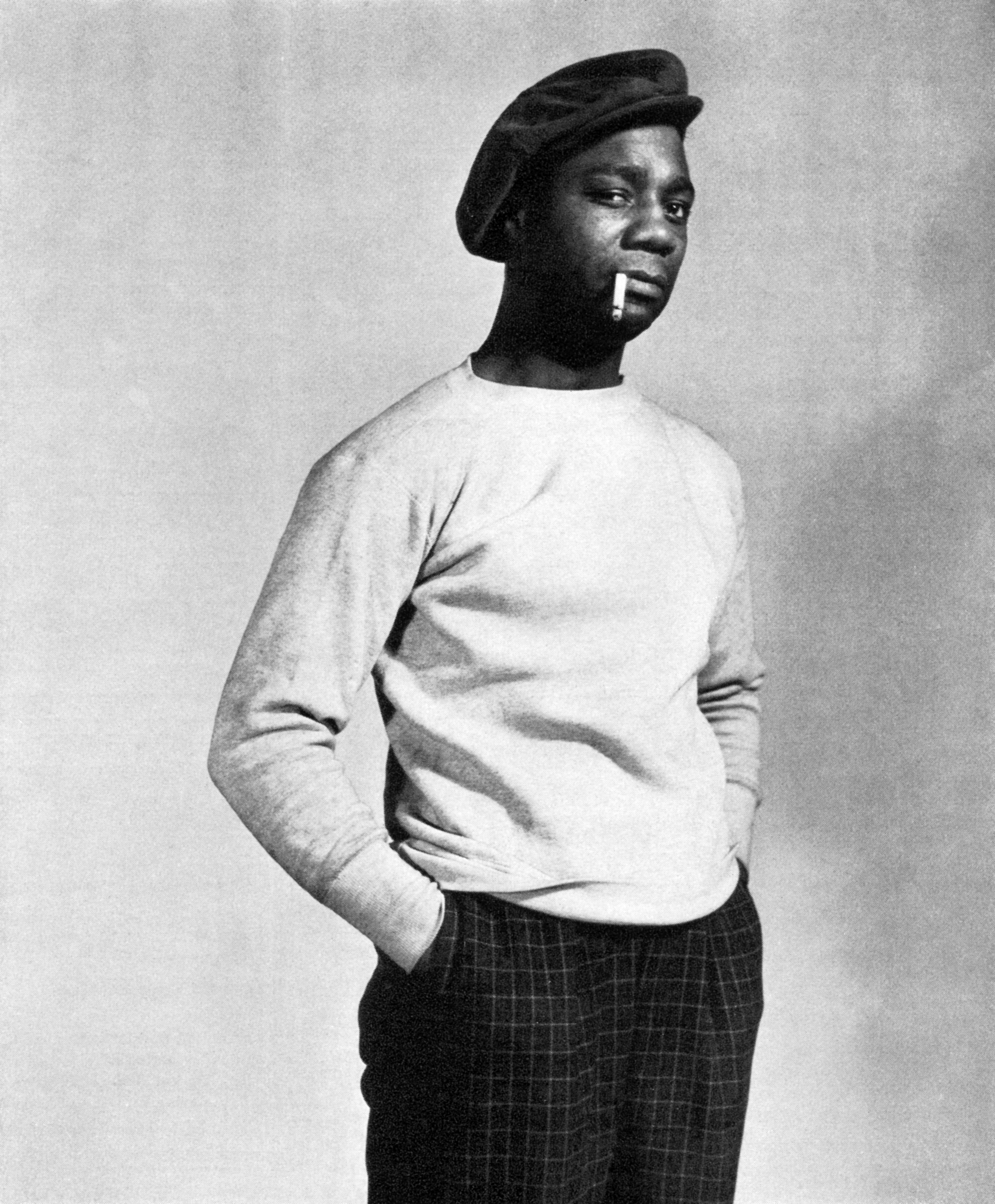
Canada Lee as Bigger Thomas in Native Son

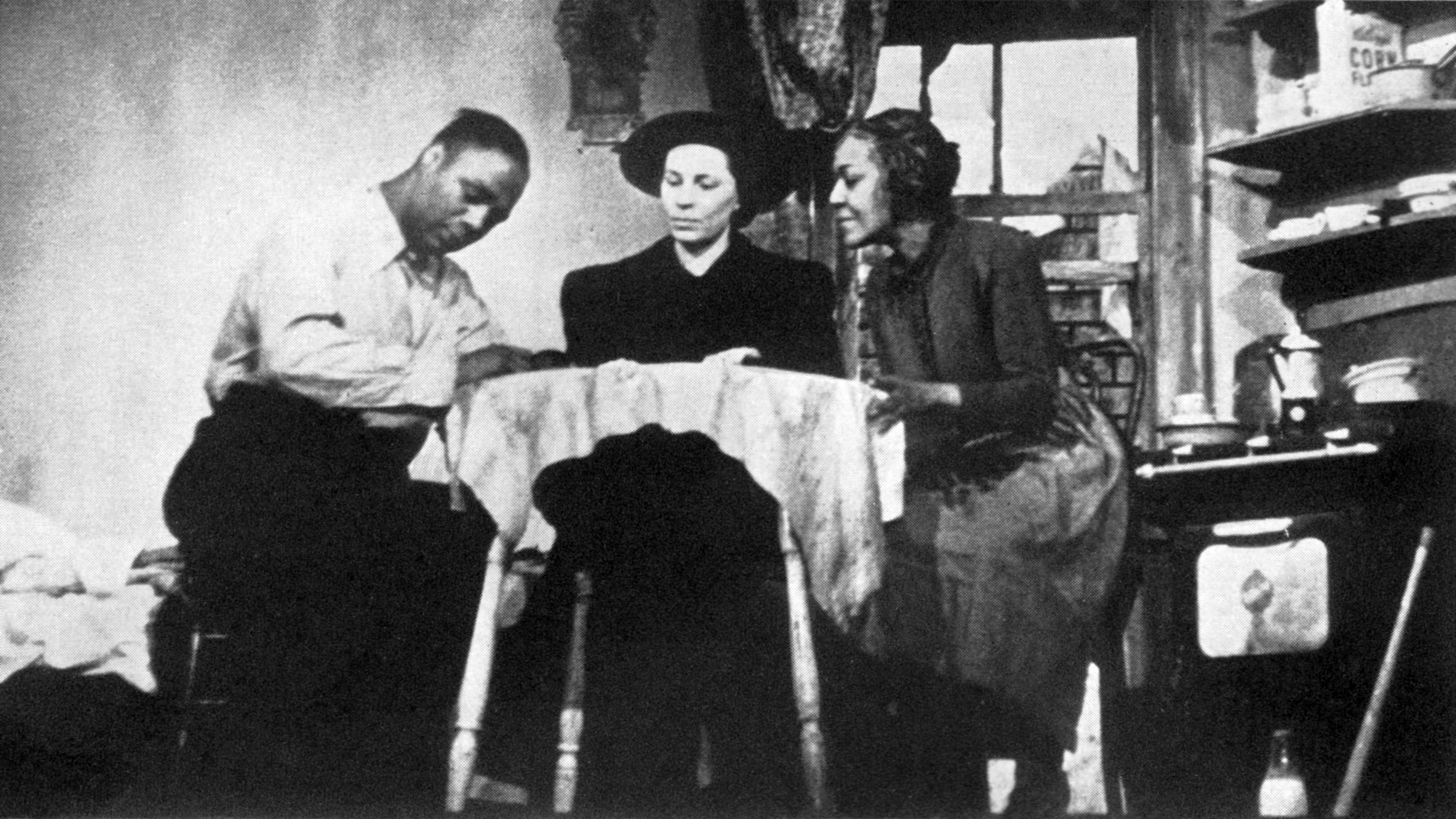
Canada Lee (Bigger Thomas), Eileen Burns (Miss Emmett) and Evelyn Ellis (Hannah Thomas)

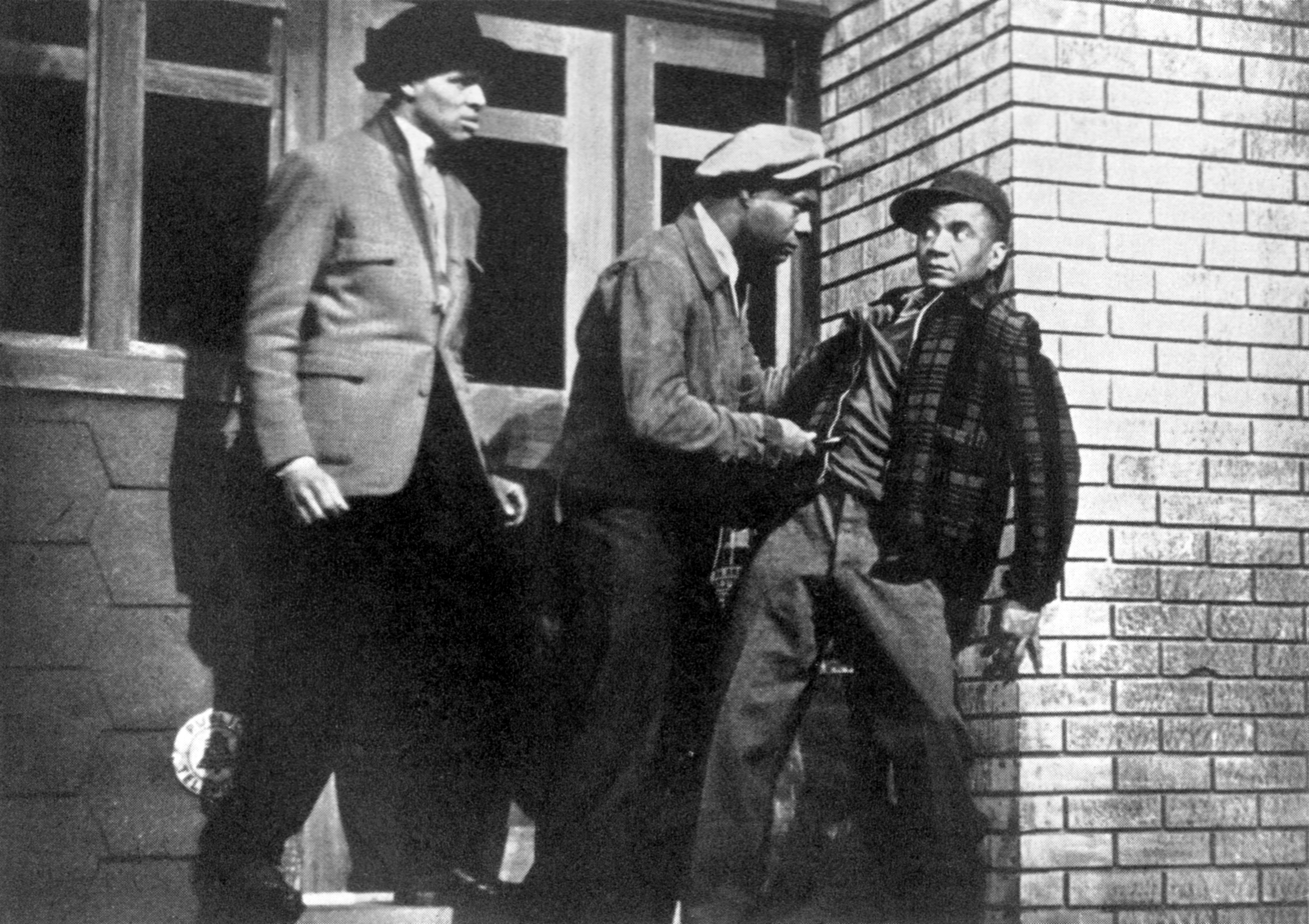
J. Flashe Riley (Jack), Canada Lee (Bigger Thomas) and Wardell Saunders (Gus Mitchell)

- Canada Lee as Bigger Thomas
- Frances Bavier as Peggy
- Everett Sloane as Britten
- Philip Bourneuf as Buckley, District Attorney
- Ray Collins as Paul Max, defense attorney
- John Berry as a reporter
- Helen Martin as Vera Thomas
- Evelyn Ellis as Hannah Thomas
- Joseph Pevney as Jan Erlone
- Erskine Sanford as Mr. Dalton
- C. M. "Bootsie" Davis as Earnie Jones
- Eileen Burns as Miss Emmett
- Anne Burr as Mary Dalton
- Nell Harrison as Mrs. Dalton
- Jacqueline Ghant Andre as a neighbor
- William Malone as Judge
- Rena Mitchell as Clara
- J. Flashe Riley as Jack
- Wardell Saunders as Gus Mitchell
- Rodester Timmons as G. H. Rankin
- Lloyd Warren as Buddy Thomas

Newspaper Men:

- Don Roberts
- Stephen Roberts
- Paul Stewart
- George Zorn

== Versions ==
The 1941 adaptation of the novel was revised in 1978 for the dedication of the Paul Green Theatre at the University of North Carolina at Chapel Hill. The script by Green and Wright was adapted again in 2006 by Cheryl West for Seattle's Intiman Theatre, however, she withdrew the right to perform it prior to the play's opening. An adaptation by director Kent Gash was presented in its stead. A later adaptation, not based on the Green-Wright script, was written by Nambi E. Kelley in 2016 for a joint production from American Blues Theater and Court Theatre in Chicago.

== Critical reception ==
Critics greeted Native Son's 1941 premiere warmly, especially praising Canada Lee's turn as Bigger Thomas. Said Rosamond Gilder in Theatre and Arts, May 1941: “Much of what is important in the novel but is lost in the play—the profound subjective exposure of the Negro's unconscious motivations- is restored by the actor's performance. Bigger's smouldering resentment against the world as he has always known it; his unreflecting violence breaking out even more easily against the things he loves—his mother, his friends, his girl—than against the things he hates; his profound frustration stemming from the denial of his right to live.” The New York Times said it was "powerful" and "exciting". Time called it "the strongest play of the season".

Aljean Harmet, writing in The New York Times, stated, “the play got excellent reviews and did good business.”
