= Cry, the Beloved Country (1951 film) =

1951 British film by Zoltán Korda

- U.S. theatrical release poster
- Directed by: Zoltán Korda
- Written by: Alan Paton (novel & screenplay); John Howard Lawson (screenplay) originally uncredited
- Produced by: Zoltan Korda; Alan Paton
- Starring: Canada Lee; Charles Carson; Sidney Poitier; Joyce Carey
- Cinematography: Robert Krasker
- Edited by: David Eady
- Music by: Raymond Gallois-Montbrun
- Production company: London Films
- Distributed by: British Lion Films
- Release dates: 23 January 1952 (U.S.); 25 April 1952 (UK)
- Running time: 103 minutes
- Country: United Kingdom
- Language: English
- Box office: £95,433 (UK)

Cry, the Beloved Country is a 1951 British drama film directed by Zoltán Korda and starring Sidney Poitier, Charles Carson and Canada Lee, in his last film role. The film is based on the novel of the same name written by Alan Paton.

== Plot ==
From the Union of South Africa, black minister Stephen Kumalo journeys to Johannesburg to help his sister in the mid-1940s, who has been reported to be ill, and to search for his son, who left home and has not kept in contact. He is also asked to visit the daughter of someone who has not heard from her for some time. With the help of fellow minister Reverend Msimangu, Kumalo discovers that his sister, a prostitute with a young son, left home to find her husband but failed to find him and has been incarcerated in prison. He discovers that his son has impregnated a young girl and is a thief and murderer. Both live in a poverty-stricken urban community. The ministers confront the already harsh reality of the pass laws before apartheid existed and its inimical effects on the country.

== Cast ==
- Canada Lee as Stephen Kumalo
- Sidney Poitier as Reverend Msimangu
- Charles Carson as James Jarvis
- Joyce Carey as Mrs. Jarvis
- Geoffrey Keen as Father Vincent
- Michael Goodliffe as Martens
- Edric Connor as John Kumalo
- Lionel Ngakane as Absolom
- Vivien Clinton as Mary
- Albertina Temba as Mrs. Kumalo
- Charles McRae as Kumalo's Friend
- Ribbon Dhlamini as Gertrude Kumalo

== Production ==
Cry, the Beloved Country was the first major film shot in South Africa, with interiors filmed in the UK at Shepperton Studios. As South Africa was under apartheid, stars Sidney Poitier and Canada Lee and producer/director Zoltan Korda informed the South African immigration authorities that Poitier and Lee were not actors but were Korda's indentured servants. After his work on the film, Lee planned to prepare a full report about life in South Africa. He was called to appear before the House Un-American Activities Committee to explain his actions but died of heart failure before he could testify.

== Release ==
The film had its premiere on 23 January 1952 at the Bijou Theatre in New York City.

== Reception ==
The film holds an 89% rating on Rotten Tomatoes. Those praising the film included Bosley Crowther in The New York Times, who stated: "It is difficult to do proper justice to the fine qualities of this film or to the courage and skill of Mr. Korda in transmitting such a difficult and sobering theme."

== Awards ==
Won

- 2nd Berlin International Film Festival – Bronze Berlin Bear

Nominated

- 1952 Cannes Film Festival – Palme d'Or
