= Evelyn Ellis =

African-American actress (1894–1958)

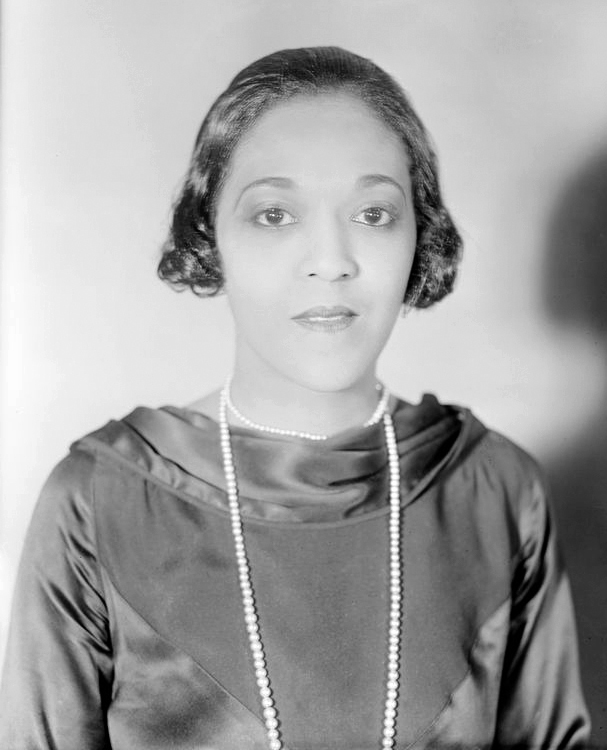
- Ellis as Bess in Porgy (1927–30)
- Born: February 2, 1894; Boston, Massachusetts, U.S.
- Died: June 5, 1958 (aged 64); Saranac Lake, New York, U.S.
- Occupation: Actress
- Years active: 1919–1953

Evelyn Ellis (February 2, 1894 – June 5, 1958) was an American character actress of stage and film. Devoting herself to the theatre, her film roles were few, but she appeared in films including The Joe Louis Story and The Lady from Shanghai. Toward the end of her career, Miss Ellis, as she was referred to in the press also directed a few theater plays, including an all-black Broadway production of Tobacco Road. The Baltimore Afro American newspaper in its issue in October 26, 1929, described her as a “quiet and unassuming young lady with a very charming personality".

== Early life ==
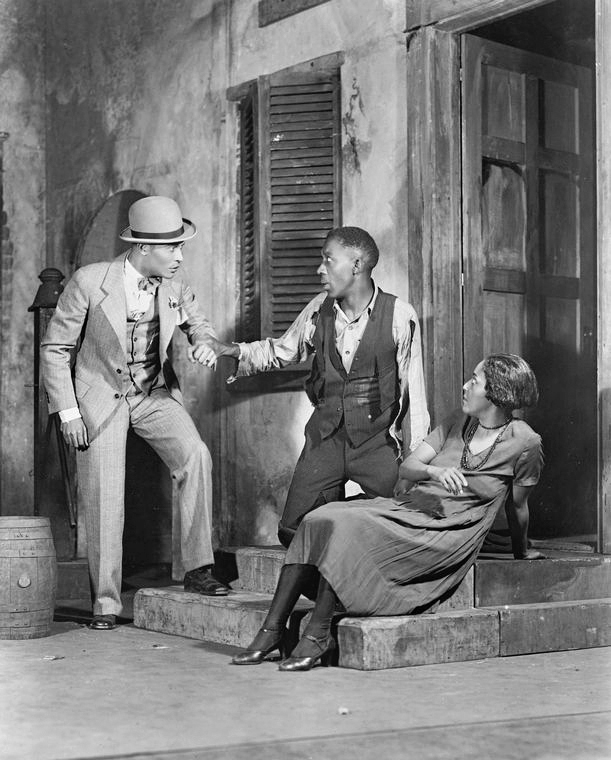
Ellis (right) as Bess, with Percy Verwayne (Sporting Life) and Frank Wilson (Porgy) in the original Broadway production of Porgy (1927)

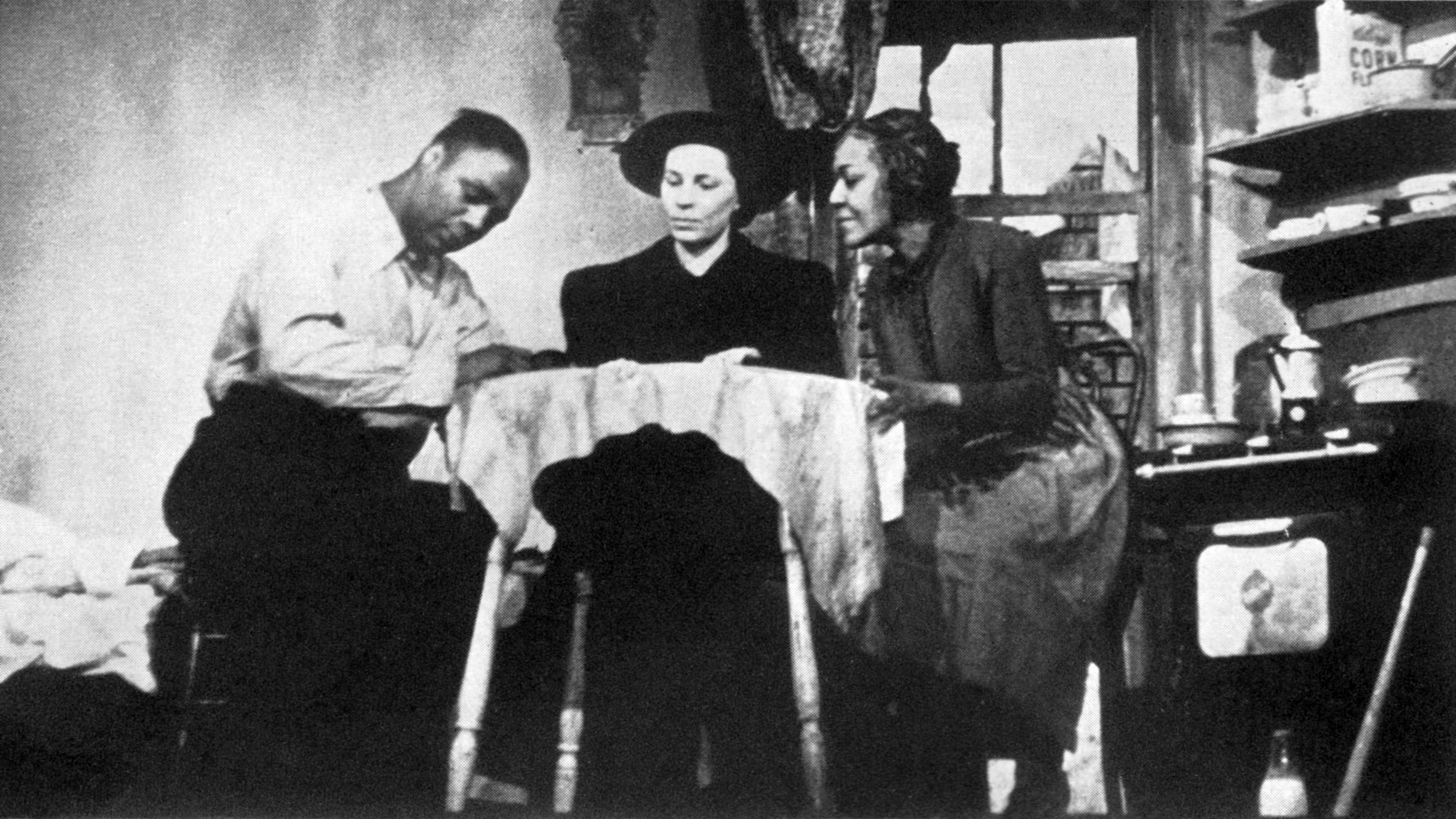
Canada Lee (Bigger Thomas), Eileen Burns (Miss Emmett) and Ellis (Hannah Thomas) in the original Broadway production of Native Son (1941)

Evelyn Ellis was born in Boston, Massachusetts, on February 2, 1894. Not much is known about her early life and introduction to acting, but she became a prominent actor within the black community, starting in 1919 until 1955. Ellis made her theatrical debut at the Lafayette Theatre in Harlem in a production of Othello in 1919. She then moved to Broadway, making her debut in the production of Roseanne by Nan Bagby Stephens. Ellis's next big Broadway show was Porgy in 1927, in which she is known for creating the character of Bess, and appeared with Rose McClendon and Frank H. Wilson. That same year, she played a lead role in Ernest Howard Culberston's production of Goat Alley, which dealt with black life in the slums of Washington, D.C. She played the character of Lucy Bell Dorsey and was praised by the New York Times Theatre Review for "her telling portrayal". She was inactive a few years due to the stock market crash of 1929 that led to the Great Depression, but she came right back and even started directing.

Ellis played in various other theatrical plays, such as Arnaud d'Usseau and James Gow's Deep Are the Roots on Broadway in 1945, in which she played Bella Charles, the mother of the returned African-American war veteran, and The Royal Family in 1952. Her next big role, however, was in Orson Welles's original Broadway production of Native Son (based on the novel of the same name by Richard Wright), in which she played Hannah Thomas, the mother of Bigger Thomas, who was played by actor Canada Lee. She also played the same role a year later in a successful revival of the play. The Afro American Baltimore states her role was "so realistic that she had already earned the praised of Broadway critics". Ellis continued to play various lead roles through her year working with the Dunbar Players of Philadelphia. During this year, she also started a drama school in Long Island for youth.

== Directing career ==
Ellis directed Horse Play in 1937 and then put on the play Little Woman in 1938 with the junior department at the Negro Little Theatre. Her most notable work as a director as well as an actress is in the all-black production of Tobacco Road in 1950. She played the role of a starving mother, which The New York Times singled out as “truthful elements that left a lasting impression”. Through her directing of a youth play and her creation of the drama school, Ellis was active in getting younger kids interested in the art of drama.

== Other works ==
- Blue Holiday (1945),
- Supper for the Dead (1954).
- Easy Money (1921)
- A Son of Satan (1924)

== Death ==
Ellis made her last Broadway appearance in 1953 and ended her acting career in 1955 with the film Interrupted Melody. Two years later, she died from a heart ailment on June 5, 1958, at the age of 64. She was hospitalized from December 1957 until her death at the Will Rogers Memorial Hospital in Saranac Lake, New York.

== Filmography ==
Year	Title	Role	Notes
1924	A Son of Satan		
1947	The Lady from Shanghai	Bessie	
1952	The Joe Louis Story	the Fighter's Mother	
1955	Interrupted Melody	Maid	

== See also ==
- Abbie Mitchell
- Florence Mills
- Rose McClendon
