= Porgy (play) =

Play by Dorothy Heyward and DuBose Heyward

Porgy: A Play in Four Acts
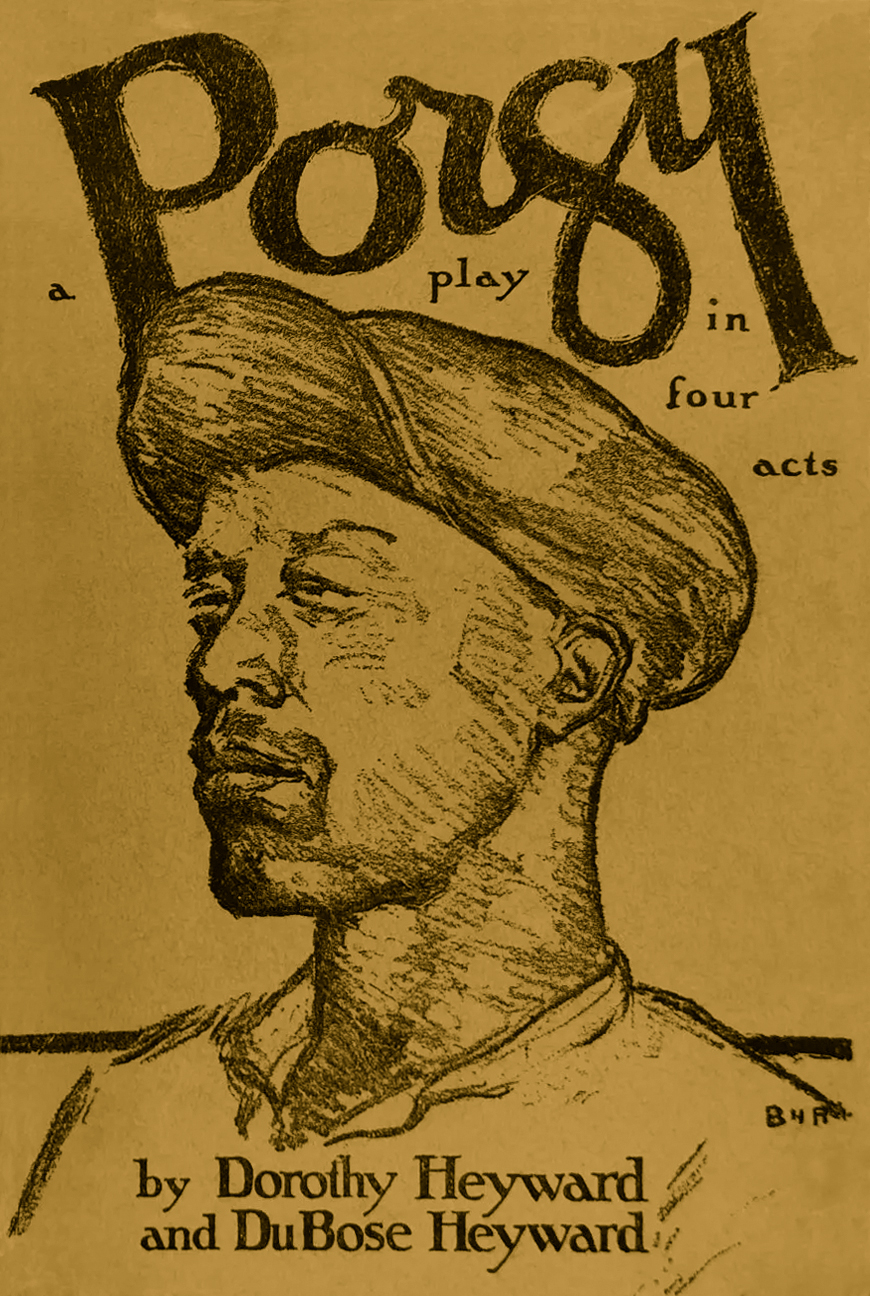
- First edition
- Written by: Dorothy Heyward; DuBose Heyward

Premiere
- Date: October 10, 1927
- Place: Guild Theatre, New York City, New York

Porgy: A Play in Four Acts is a play by Dorothy Heyward and DuBose Heyward, adapted from the short novel by DuBose Heyward. It was first produced by the Theatre Guild and presented October 10, 1927 – August 1928 at the Guild Theatre in New York City. Featuring a cast of African Americans at the insistence of its authors—a decision unusual for its time—the original production starred Frank Wilson, Evelyn Ellis, Jack Carter, and Rose McClendon. Porgy marked the Broadway directing debut of Rouben Mamoulian. The play ran a total of 55 weeks in New York, and the original cast toured the United States twice and performed for 11 consecutive weeks in London.

The play tells the story of Porgy, a disabled black beggar who lives in the slums of Charleston, South Carolina. It relates his efforts to rescue Bess, the woman he loves, from Crown, her violent and possessive lover, and a drug dealer called Sportin' Life.

The play is the basis of the libretto of the opera Porgy and Bess (1935).

== History ==
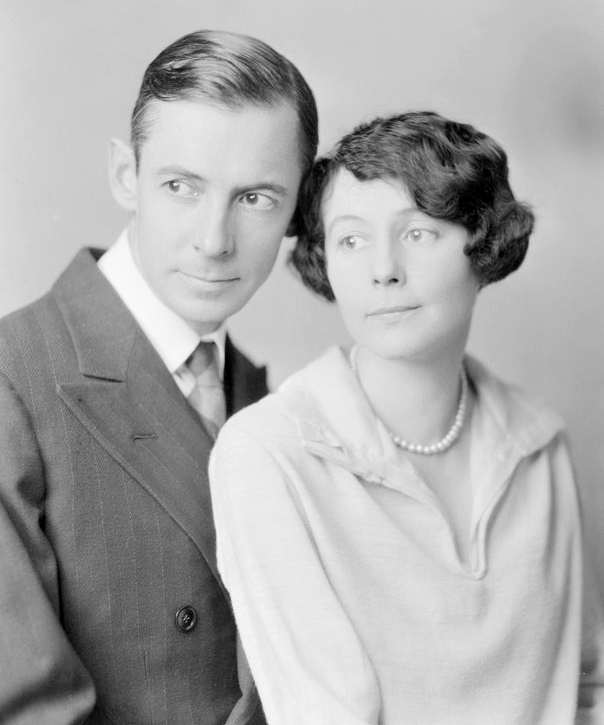
DuBose and Dorothy Heyward, authors of the play Porgy

A descendant of Thomas Heyward, Jr., DuBose Heyward was from an old, white family in Charleston, South Carolina. In 1925, he published his first and best-regarded novel, Porgy, which was inspired by a news story and drawn from his sympathetic observations of African-American culture. The book was a best seller. Porgy was one of a number of works portraying black life written by white authors, but it was infused with human understanding at a time that such an approach was new.

Heyward's wife, playwright Dorothy Heyward, roughed out a stage adaptation of the novel that persuaded her husband of the story's dramatic possibilities. They wrote the play together, strengthening the character of Bess, incorporating folk songs, and creating a more upbeat ending that shows Porgy following Bess to New York.

In 1959, the year the Porgy and Bess film was released, Dorothy Heyward detailed her—and her husband's—respective contributions to the novel's stage adaptation: “I was recovering from my first Broadway play venture at the time ‘Porgy’ was published. I had had a rather rough experience with my ‘Nancy Ann,’ which was played by a great star of that period, Francine Larrimore, but which lasted only 40 performances. I still think it deserved a better fate. Anyway, I was not in good health, and I wasn’t supposed to be doing my work. But ‘Porgy’ seemed to me to have a stage potential. My husband was not especially theatrically minded at that time, being more concerned with novels and poetry. So, I worked on an adaptation secretly. This went on for about seven months. When I had finished the dramatizations, I read it to DuBose. He was surprised and amused. But he liked it except for certain passages. For example, he said the crap-shooting scene had an effeminate quality about it. He fixed that and some other portions, and we sent it off to New York as a co-authored play. The first three managements that read the script wanted it. The Theater Guild won out.”

Just as the novel had been one of the first to regard African-American culture seriously, Porgy was the first authentic presentation of black culture on the Broadway stage. The Heywards insisted that an African-American cast perform the play, providing much-needed employment for black actors and offering white audiences a mature view of African-American life. DuBose Heyward credited the actors—many of whom had theater experience going back generations—as collaborators whose contributions transformed the drama on the stage.

== Production ==
Sponsored by the Theatre Guild, Porgy was given its premiere on Broadway, running October 10, 1927, to August 1928, at the Guild Theatre and the Republic Theatre.

Porgy then went on tour—for nine weeks in Chicago, 11 weeks in London, and in cities including Boston, Philadelphia, Cincinnati, Washington, Cleveland, Pittsburgh, Baltimore, Detroit, San Francisco, Los Angeles, and others in the northwestern United States and Canada. The show returned to New York, running September 13 to October 1929 at the Martin Beck Theatre.

After a total of 55 weeks in New York, all of the original principal cast members of Porgy toured the nation once again, performing from October 14, 1929, into January 1930.

Porgy marked the Broadway directing debut of Rouben Mamoulian. Settings were designed by Cleon Throckmorton. Portraying an aristocratic Charleston attorney, Erskine Sanford was one of only three white actors in the 65-member cast of Porgy. The boys band from the Jenkins Orphanage of Charleston was also featured.

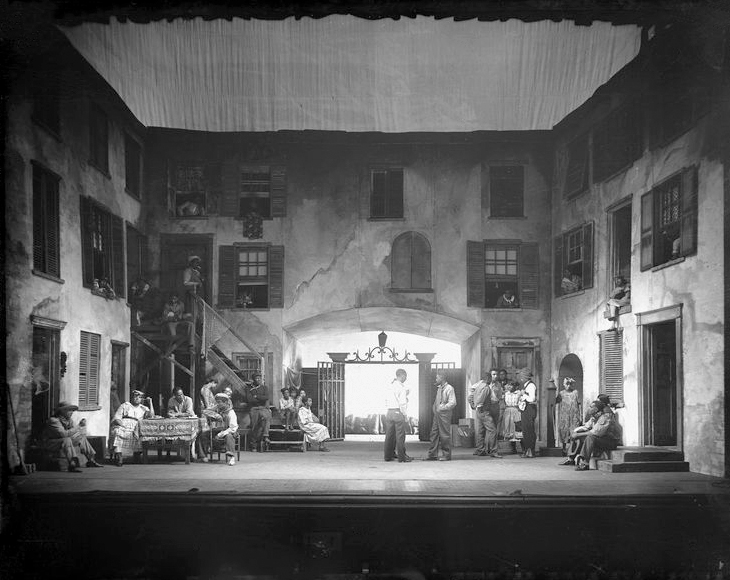
Setting for Catfish Row by Cleon Throckmorton

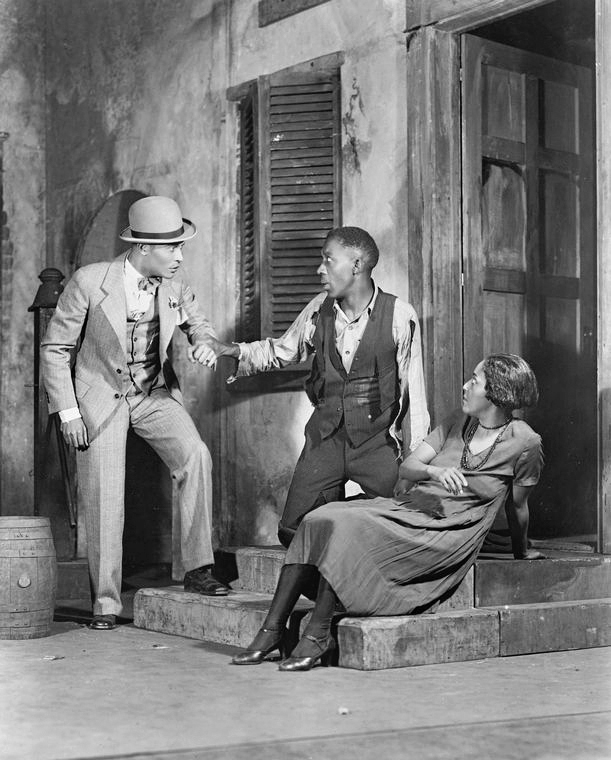
Percy Verwayne (Sporting Life), Frank Wilson (Porgy) and Evelyn Ellis (Bess)

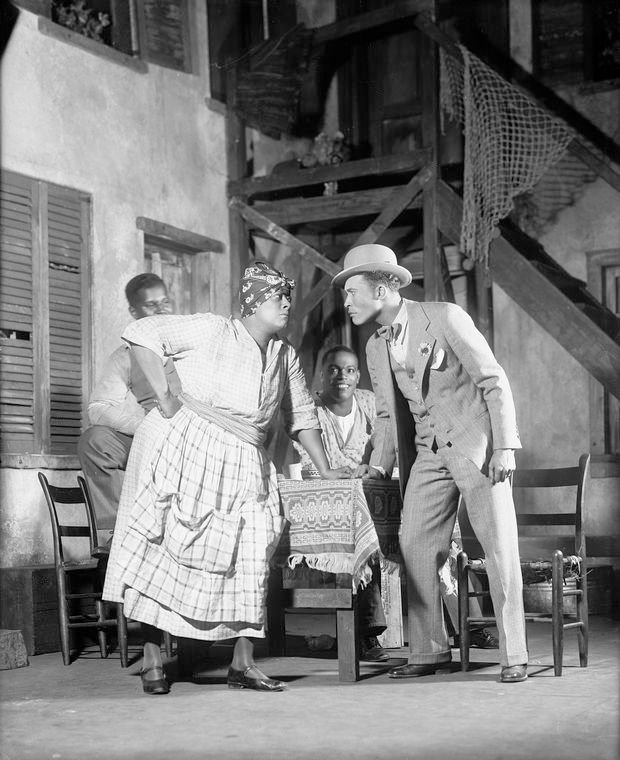
Georgette Harvey (Maria) and Percy Verwayne (Sporting Life)

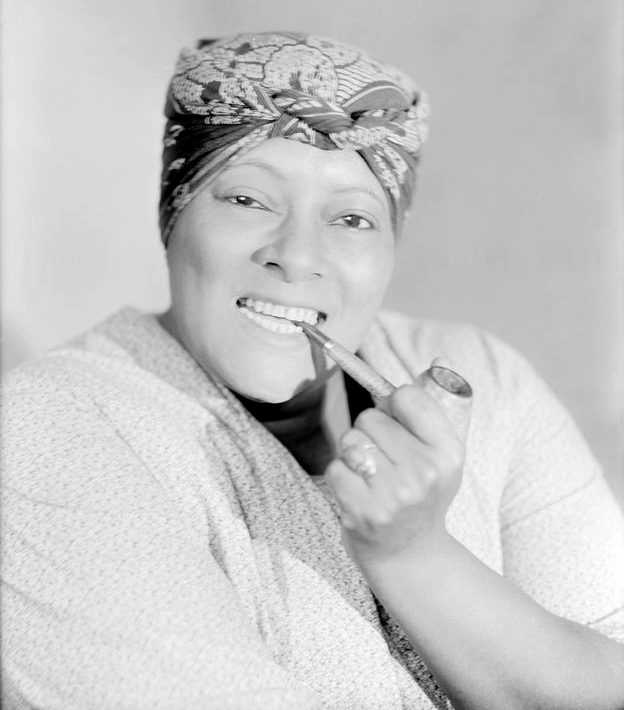
Georgette Harvey (Maria)

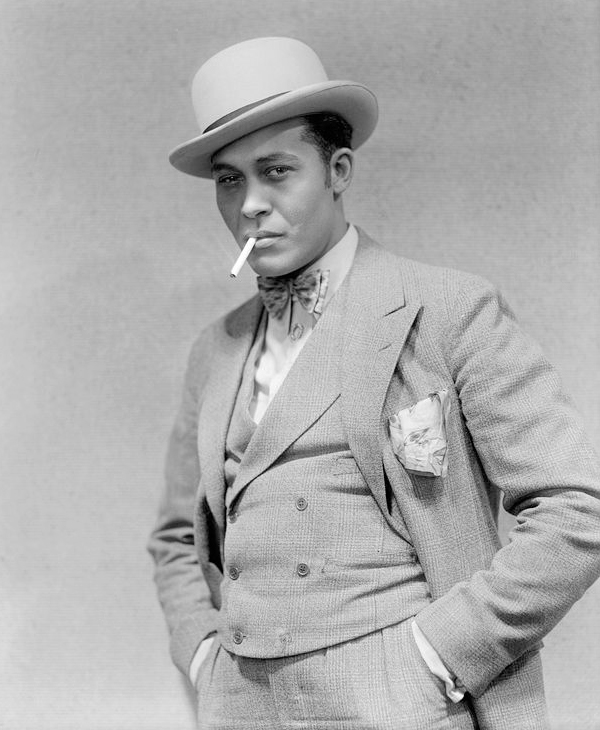
Percy Verwayne (Sporting Life)

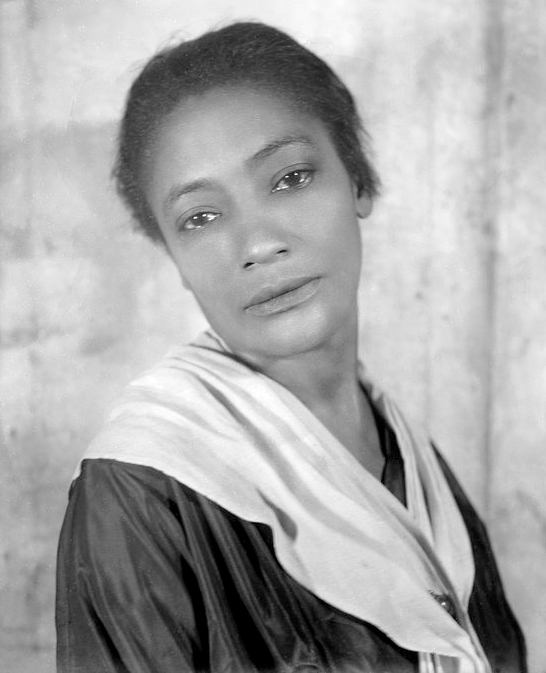
Rose McClendon (Serena)

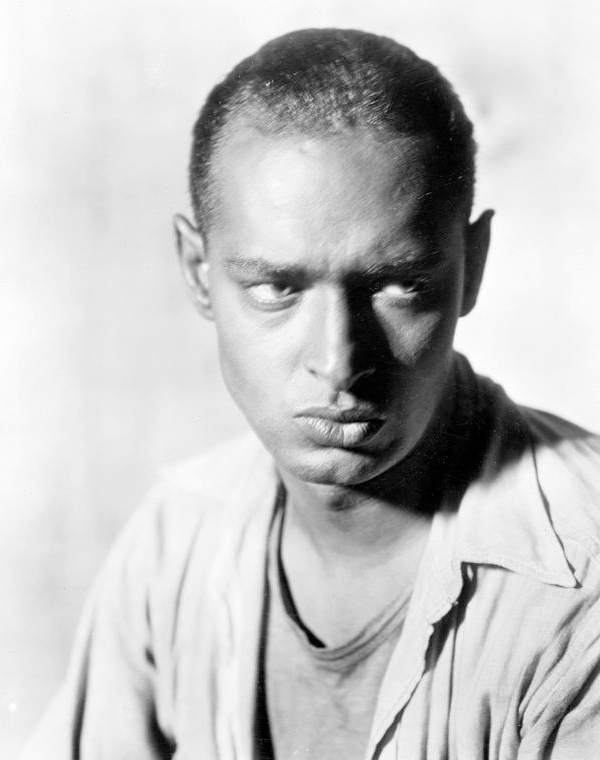
Jack Carter (Crown)

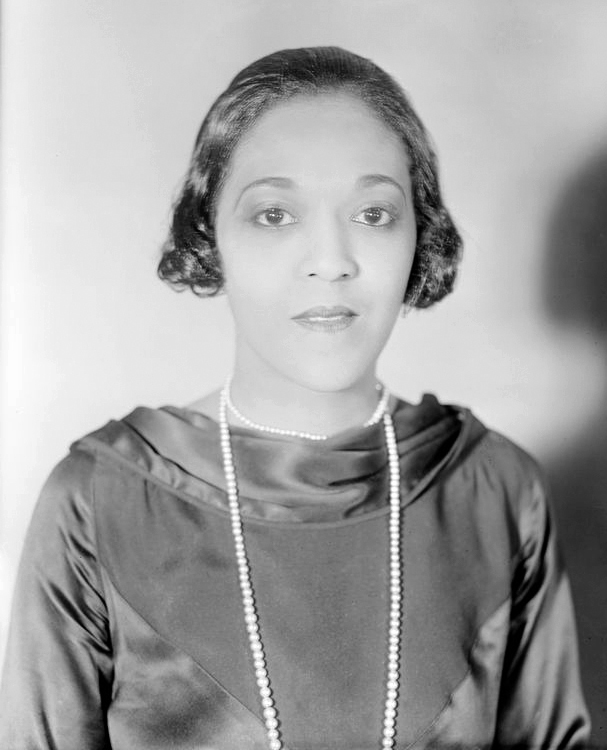
Evelyn Ellis (Bess)

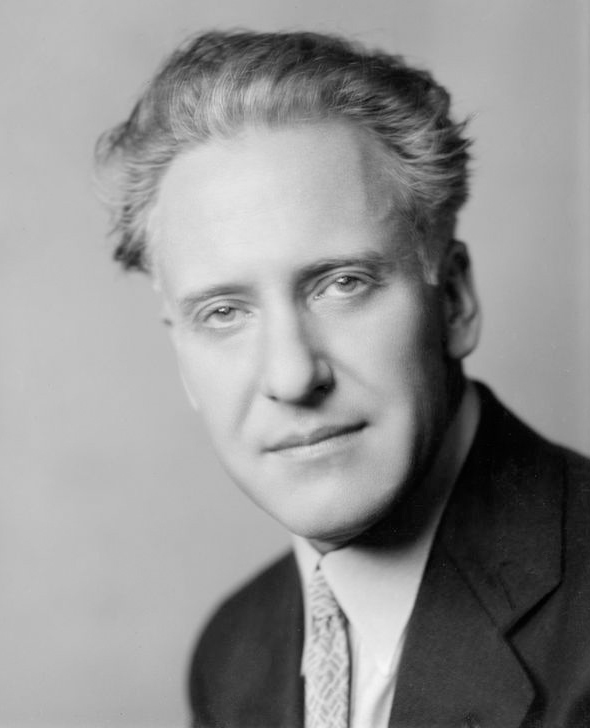
Erskine Sanford (Alan Archdale)

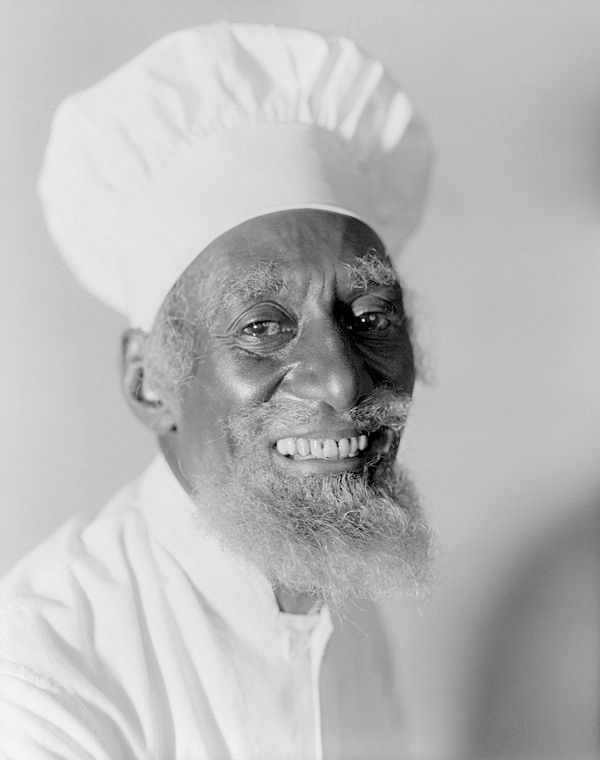
Leigh Whipper (The Crab Man)

=== Cast ===
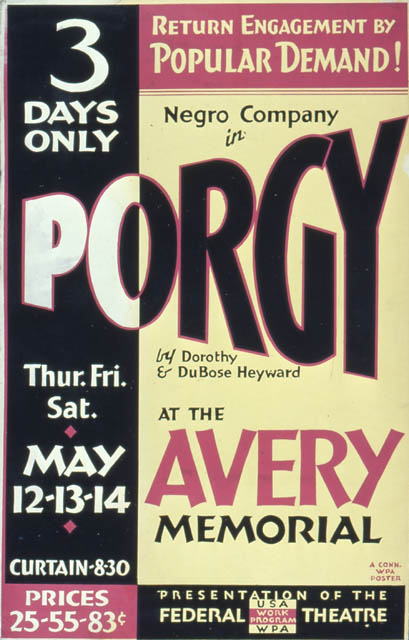
Poster for the 1938 Federal Theatre Project production at Avery Memorial Theatre in Hartford, Connecticut

The original cast members are listed in order of appearance.

- Maria, keeper of the cookshop … Georgette Harvey
- Jake, captain of the fishing fleet … Wesley Hill
- Lily … Dorothy Paul
- Mingo … Richard Huey
- Annie … Ella Madison
- Sporting Life … Percy Verwayne
- Serena, Robbins' wife … Rose McClendon
- Robbins, a young stevedore … Lloyd Gray
- Jim, a stevedore … Peter Clark
- Clara, Jake's wife … Marie Young
- Peter, the honeyman … Hayes Pryor
- Porgy, a crippled beggar … Frank Wilson
- Crown, a stevedore … Jack Carter
- Crown's Bess … Evelyn Ellis
- A Detective … Stanley DeWolfe
- Two Policemen … Maurice McRae, Hugh Rennie
- Undertaker … Leigh Whipper
- Scipio … Melville Greene
- Simon Frazier, a lawyer … A. B. Comathiere
- Alan Archdale … Erskine Sanford
- The Crab Man … Leigh Whipper
- The Coroner … Garrett Minturn
- Residents of Catfish Row, Fishermen, Children, Stevedores, etc. … Clarissa Blue, Marguerite Booth, Lillian Cowan, Zora Donahoo, Catherine Francis, Ella Gordon, Rosa Johnson, Marie Remsen, Musa Williams, Frank Allen, Edward Perry, Smith Reed, Charles Taylor, Philip Thomas, Carl Mahon, Edward Chauers, Teddie Brown, Richard Bruce, Mable Ridley, John Dowling

== Publication ==
The Theatre Guild acting version of the play Porgy was published in 1927 by Doubleday, Doran and Company.
