= Frank H. Wilson =

American actor (1886–1956)

Frank Wilson
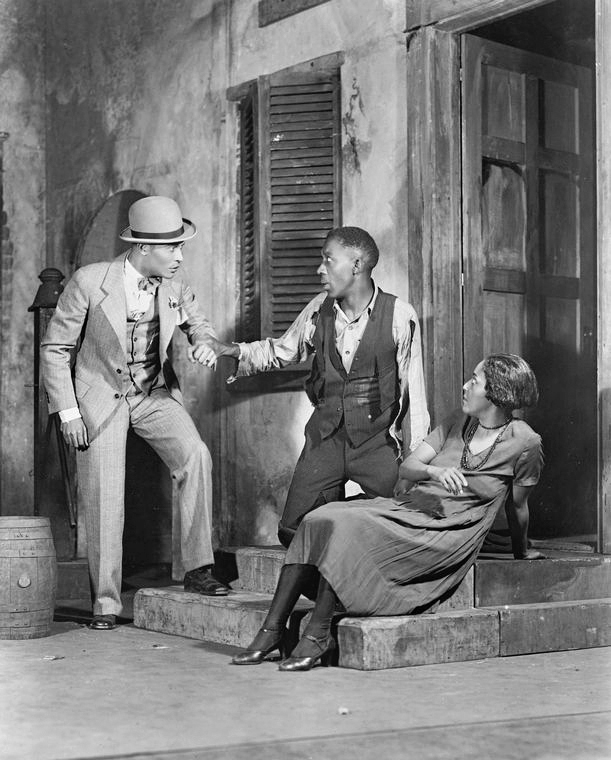
- Frank Wilson (center) as Porgy, with Percy Verwayne and Evelyn Ellis in the original Broadway production of Porgy (1927)
- Born: Frank Henry Wilson; May 4, 1886; Harlem, New York
- Died: February 16, 1956 (aged 69); Queens, New York
- Occupation: Actor
- Years active: 1914–1954
- Spouse(s): Effie King (stage name of Anna Green; maiden; 1887–1944)
- Children: Emmett Barrymore Wilson (1923–2013)

Frank Henry Wilson (May 4, 1886 – February 16, 1956) was an American stage, radio, and film actor and writer.

== Career ==
His father was Thomas M. Wilson. Frank started out in show business in vaudeville and minstrelsy. He appeared in many plays, including the original 1927 version of Porgy with Rose McClendon and Evelyn Ellis. In 1925, he was in the cast of a revival of O'Neill's The Emperor Jones in 1925. In 1929 he appeared in Eugene O'Neill's play All God's Chillun Got Wings at the Royal Court Theatre in London. He was also cast in Clifford Odets' 1949 play The Big Knife.

He made his film debut in 1932 and later played in films that had stage origins: The Emperor Jones (1933) and Warner Bros.' Green Pastures (1936) and Watch on the Rhine (1943). Wilson made his television debut in 1953 before dying in 1956.

== Selected filmography ==
Year	Title	Role	Notes
1932	The Girl from Chicago	Wade Washington	
1933	The Emperor Jones	Jeff	
1936	The Green Pastures	Moses	
1940	Paradise in Harlem	Lem Anderson	Also writer (original story)
1941	Murder on Lenox Avenue		Writer (original story)
1941	Sunday Sinners		Writer (original story)
1943	Watch on the Rhine	Joseph	
1946	Beware	Professor Drury	

== Family ==
Wilson married actress Effie King, the stage name of Anna Green (maiden; 1888–1944), on June 12, 1907. They married in Manhattan at St. Mark's Methodist Episcopal Church on West 53rd Street, a block that was a cultural center for artistic and intellectual African Americans. Effie King, at the time, was a dancer and contralto who performed as a duet with Lottie Gee (née Charlotte O. Gee; 1886–1973), a dancer and soprano in African-American vaudeville circuits. From about 1911 through 1913, King and Gee were known as Ford Dabney's Ginger Girls.
