= Georgette Harvey =

American actress and singer (1882–1952)

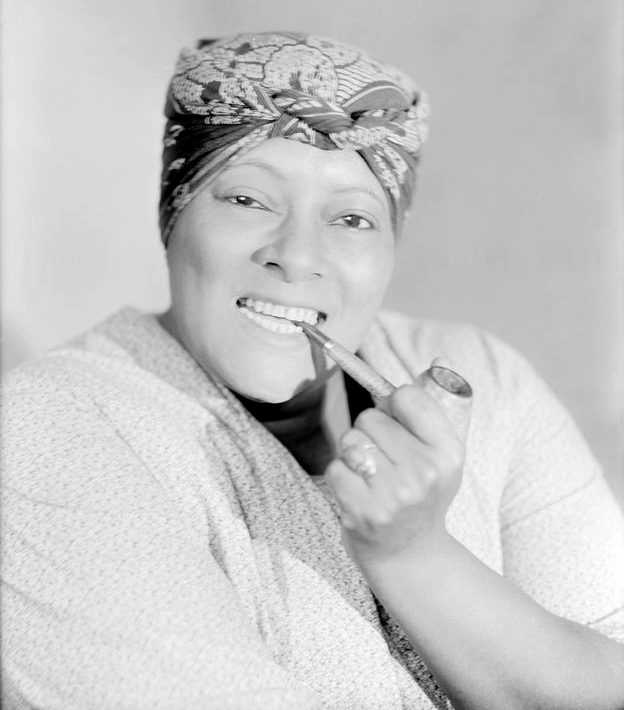
- Harvey as Maria in Porgy (1927)
- Born: December 31, 1884; St. Louis, Missouri, U.S.
- Died: February 17, 1952 (aged 67); New York City, U.S.
- Occupations: Actress, singer
- Years active: 1902–1939

Georgette Harvey (December 31, 1884 – February 17, 1952) was an American singer and actress who performed on stage and in films. She is perhaps most famous for creating the role of Maria in the original Broadway production of Porgy (1927) and the 1935 Broadway production of George Gershwin's opera Porgy and Bess.

== Biography ==
At age 18 Georgette Harvey left her native St. Louis, Missouri, for New York City. She formed a quartet, the Creole Belles, that performed briefly in the U.S. before going to Europe. After some years the group disbanded but Harvey stayed on, performing in nightclubs and cabarets.

She lived and performed in Russia for 16 years, and left at the outset of the Russian Revolution. She briefly performed in Japan before returning to the United States. She became a character actress and singer on the Broadway stage. Her credits include Brown Sugar (1937), Porgy, Stevedore, Porgy and Bess, Mamba's Daughters and Anna Lucasta.

Although Harvey made a screen test for the role of Mammy in Gone With the Wind (1939), Hattie McDaniel won the role. Harvey's screen test survives today and a portion can be glimpsed in the documentary The Making of a Legend: Gone with the Wind (1988).

Harvey died February 17, 1952, aged 69.

== Theater ==
- Porgy (1927)
- Ol' Man Satan (1932)
- Stevedore (1934)
- Porgy and Bess (1935)
- Brown Sugar (1937)
- Mamba's Daughters (1939)
- Anna Lucasta (1944)
- Lost in the Stars

== Filmography ==
- Social Register (1934)
- Chloe, Love Is Calling You (1934)
- Back Door to Heaven (1939)
- The Middleton Family at the New York World's Fair (1939)
