= Dorothy Heyward =

American dramatist (1890–1961)

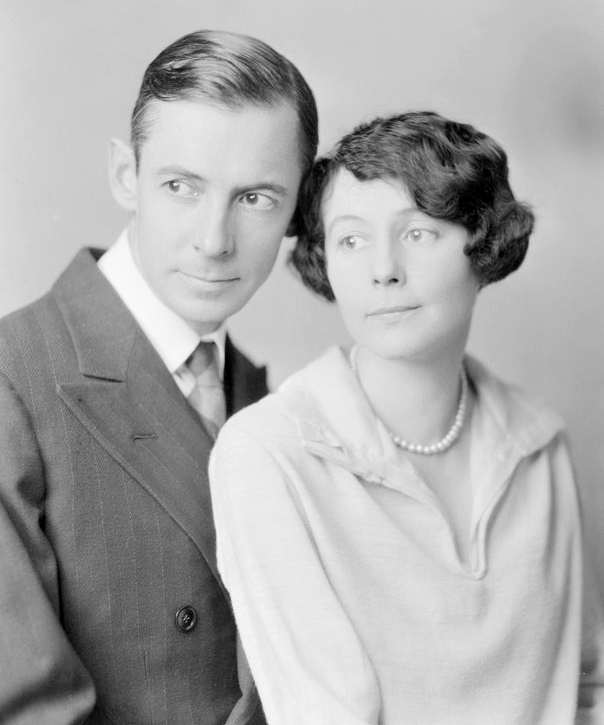
DuBose and Dorothy Heyward, authors of the play Porgy (1927)

Dorothy Heyward (née Kuhns; June 6, 1890 – November 19, 1961) was an American playwright.

In addition to several works of her own, she co-authored the play Porgy (1927) with her husband DuBose Heyward, adapting it from his novel of the same name. Their work is now known best in its adaptation as the opera Porgy and Bess (1935), with music by George Gershwin.

== Early life and education ==
She was born in Wooster, Ohio, as Dorothy Kuhns, and lived in New York, Puerto Rico, and Washington, DC, throughout her childhood years. She was interested in literature from an early age and started writing plays. After graduating from high school, she attended Harvard University, where she studied to become a playwright.

In 1922, Kuhns attended MacDowell Colony, where she met DuBose Heyward. They married in September 1923 and she changed her name.

== Career as a playwright ==
In 1924, Heyward wrote her first play, The Dud, for which she won a Harvard Prize and participated in Dr. George Pierce Baker's Workshop 47. The Dud was later retitled to Nancy Ann, and Nancy Ann was produced on Broadway in 1924, running a total of 40 performances.

When her husband was writing his novel Porgy, Dorothy Heyward saw dramatic possibilities in the story. She convinced him that it would work as a play. They collaborated to adapt it to the stage, making sure the play's company be cast with only black actors. This was seen as a controversial decision during its time, when black characters were almost always portrayed by white actors in blackface. Nonetheless, the play was a success and the 1927 Theatre Guild production ran for 367 performances.

Their play was later adapted as the opera Porgy and Bess (1935), with music by George Gershwin and lyrics by Ira Gershwin and DuBose Heyward. This was adapted as a film by the same name in 1959.

Throughout her career, Heyward wrote many plays, most of which did not achieve the same level of success as Porgy. Her play Jonica, co-written in 1930 with playwright Moss Hart, and her plays South Pacific, Cinderelative, and Set My People Free, were all performed on Broadway but were ultimately short-lived.

In 1939, Heyward collaborated with her husband on their play Mamba's Daughters, which was adapted from DuBose's 1929 novel of the same name.

Many of her works focused on African-American culture and often touched on subjects such as slavery and prejudice.

In the 1930s, Heyward wrote several novels, including one in 1930 titled Three-a-Day, and another in 1932 titled The Pulitzer Prize Murders.

== Plays ==
- The Dud (Retitled Nancy Ann) (1924)
- Love in a Cupboard (1925)
- Porgy (1927), co-written with DuBose Heyward
- Jonica (1930), musical: book co-written with Moss Hart; lyrics by William Moll; music by Joseph Meyer
- Cinderelative (1930), co-written with Dorothy De Jagers
- Mamba's Daughter's (1939), co-written with DuBose Hayward, adapted from DuBose Heyward's 1929 novel of the same name
- South Pacific (1943), co-written with Howard Rigby (not correlated with the Rodgers and Hammerstein musical of the same name)
- Set My People Free (1948)
- Babar the elephant (1953), children's opera: co-written with Nicolai Berezowsky and Judith Randal; based on the Babar the Elephant stories by Jean de Brunhoff

== Novels ==
- Three-a-Day (1930)
- The Pulitzer Prize Murders (1932)
