= The Schemers (1922 film) =

The Schemers is a 1922 REOL Productions film with a plot about chemists developing a substitute for gasoline. Written and directed by Wallace Johnson, it stars African American actors George Edward Brown, Lawrence Chenault, Walter Thomas and Edna Morton. Lobby cards for the film were donated to the New York Public Library. Three of the images are online. Pursuers of the formula carry out a kidnapping and a detective works the case.

Robert Levy is listed as director in the copyright.

== Cast ==
- Edna Morton
- G. Edward Brown
- Lawrence Chenault
- Walter Thomas
- Bob Slater
- Orma Crosby
