= Percy Verwayne =

American actor (1895–1968)

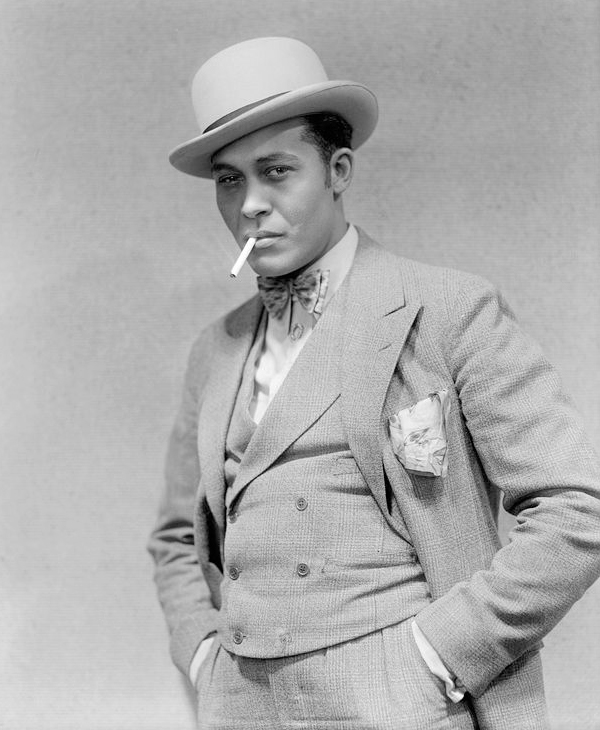
- Verwayne as Sporting Life in the original Broadway production of Porgy (1927)
- Born: March 10, 1895; Georgetown, British Guyana
- Died: November 1968 (aged 73); New York City, U.S.
- Occupation: Actor
- Years active: 1921–1957

Percy Verwayne (March 10, 1895 – November 1968), sometimes spelled Percy Verwayen, was an American stage, vaudeville and film actor. He featured in several films with African American casts including the 1921 REOL Productions film The Call of His People and Oscar Micheaux films. He played "Sporting Life" in Porgy, when it was first produced in 1927. He was also in the 1946 Toddy Pictures production Fight That Ghost.

== Biography ==
Verwayne was born in Georgetown, British Guyana, in 1895. The first movie Verwayne was known to have starred in was The Call of His People (1921), which co-starred actors like Edna Morton, Lawrence Chenault, and Mercedes Gilbert. In 1924, Verwayne played a part in multiple vaudeville acts at the Dunbar Theatre, alongside Edna Lewis Thomas.

== Theatre ==
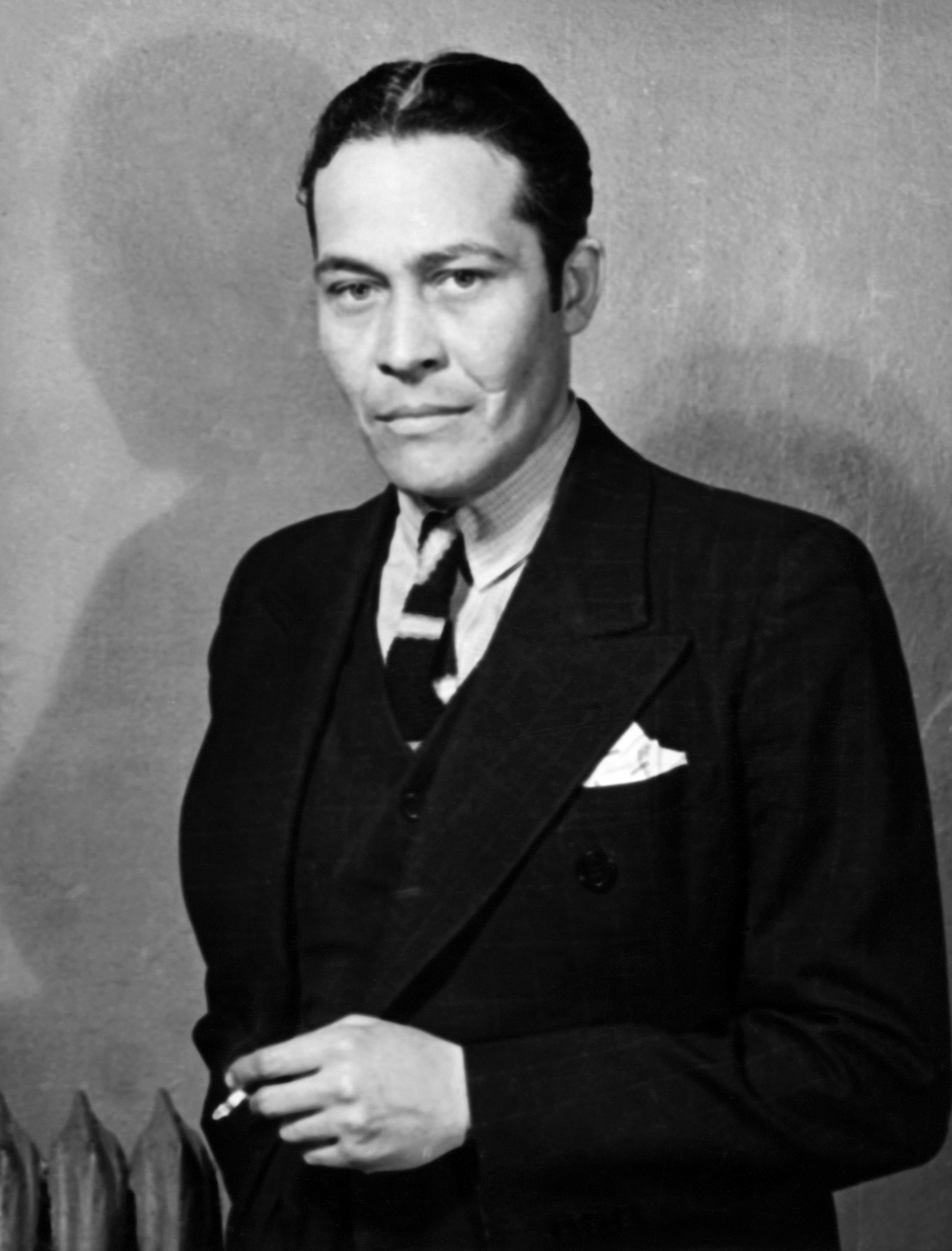
Verwayne as Mr. Primero in the Federal Theatre Project production of Frank Wilson's Walk Together Chillun (1936)

- Porgy (1927)
- Confidence (1930), by and starring Frank Wilson

== Filmography ==
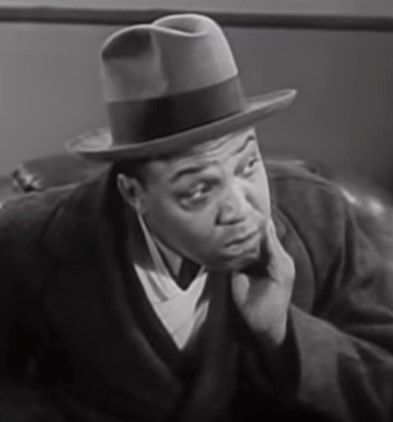
Verwayne in Paradise in Harlem (1939)

- The Call of His People (1921)
- The Simp (1921 film)
- The Burden of Race (1921)
- The Secret Sorrow (1921)
- A Daughter of the Congo (1930) as Pidgy Muffy
- Paradise in Harlem (1939) as Spanish
- Fight that Ghost (1946)
- Sepia Cinderella (1947) as MacMillan
