= The Call of His People =

1922 American race film

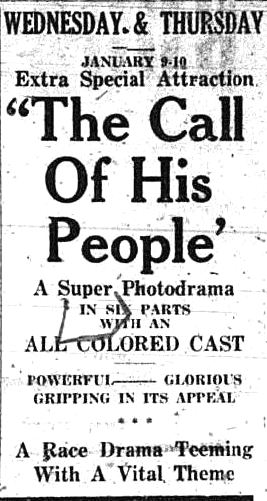

The Call of His People is a 1922 American race film adapted from Aubrey Bowser's serialized novel, The Man Who Would Be White. It was the second film produced by REOL Productions, Robert Levy's film company that made films with black casts.

The story is about a coffee businessman who passes for white before reconnecting with his heritage and a past love.

The New York Public Library has stills from the film.

== Cast ==
- George Edward Brown
- Edna Morton
- Mae Kemp
- James Steven
- Lawrence Chenault
- Mercedes Gilbert
- Percy Verwayen
