= Spitfire (1922 film) =

Spitfire is a lost 1922 REOL Productions film. Stills from the film survive, but the film itself is lost. The film stars George E. Brown and Edna Morton. It was advertised as a "virile heart stirring drama".

The film is about a man in Maryland who moves to a small town and helps build a library and school. He secures love and fulfillment. The film incorporated the social theories of Booker T. Washington.

It was written by Osborne Williams. Brown and Morton also started in the 1922 REOL film The Call of His People.

== Cast ==
- Edna Morton
- George Edward Brown (G. Edward Brown) as Guy Rogers
- Lawrence Chenault
- Daisy Martin
- Mabel Young
- Sam Cook
- Edward Williams

== See also ==
- Race film
- African American cinema
