= The Jazz Hounds =

Short comedy film with African American cast

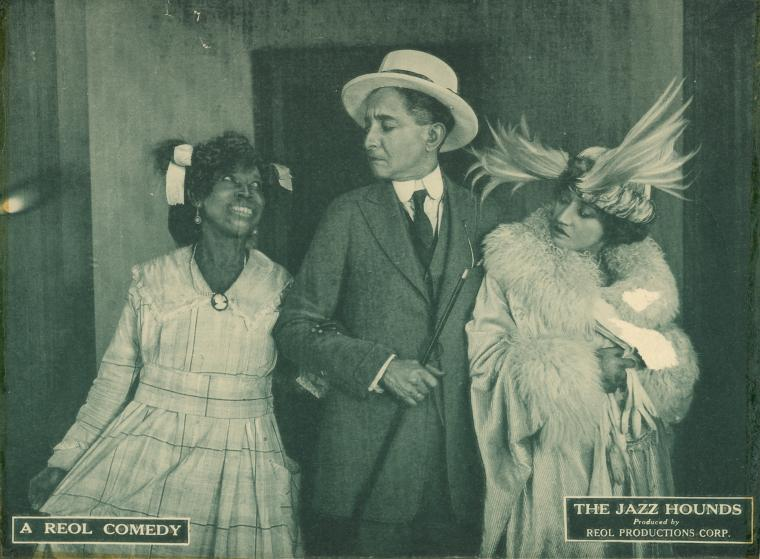
Publicity still

The Jazz Hounds is a 1922 American short comedy film with an African American cast. Robert Levy's REOL Productions produced the film. Stills from the film are extant.

This film and Easy Money were the only REOL films that were not dramas.

== Cast ==
- Edna Morton
- Lawrence Chenault
