= Ties of Blood =

1921 American film

- Color process: Black and white
- Production company: REOL Productions
- Release date: 1921
- Language: Silent

Ties of Blood is a 1921 American silent race film and drama, produced by REOL Productions. It is considered a lost film as of October 2019.

Many of the cast had been members of the Lafayette Players of Harlem. It was released in September 1921 at Philadelphia's Royal Theater.

== Cast ==
- Inez Clough
- Arthur Ray
- Henry Pleasant
