= Estelle Pinckney Clough =

American opera singer (1866–1929)

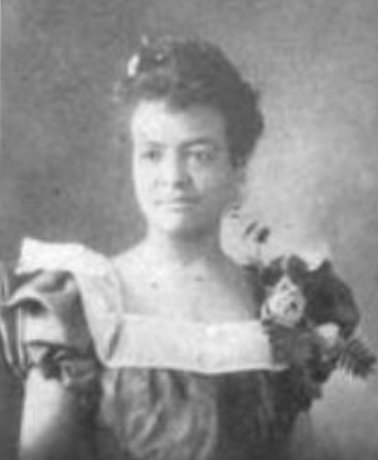
- Estelle Pinckney Clough, from a 1901 publication
- Born: 1866
- Died: June 8, 1929 (aged 62–63); Worcester, Massachusetts, U.S.
- Resting place: Hope Cemetery
- Other names: Estella Pinckney, Stella Pinckney Clough
- Occupation: Opera vocalist
- Relatives: Inez Clough (sister-in-law)

Estelle Pinckney Clough (1866 – June 8, 1929) was an American opera singer and concert performer, based in Worcester, Massachusetts. She was known for her performances in the title role of Aida in the early 1900s.

== Career ==
Clough, a coloratura soprano, was one of several African-American sopranos who sang the title role in Verdi's Aida around the turn into the twentieth century, along with Caterina Jarboro and Florence Cole Talbert. Clough was Aida when the opera was performed by the Theodore Drury Opera Company in New York in 1903 and 1906. She was a soloist in Samuel Coleridge-Taylor's Hiawatha in Washington, D.C. in 1904, sharing the bill with Harry Burleigh. A 1905 review praised her "wonderful timbre and flexibility of her well-cultured voice," adding that "she was loudly encored, and in her response with more familiar songs the mellow sweetness of her voice was evidenced." In 1906, she was soloist at the first concert of the Coleridge-Taylor Singing Union in New Haven, and sang at a fundraiser for the Colored Men's Branch of the YMCA.

In 1908, Clough sang at a memorial service for inventor Joseph Lee, with her daughter as her accompanist. In 1911, she and her daughter were on the program at a commemoration of the centenary of abolitionist Charles Sumner at Faneuil Hall. In 1916, she sang at a tribute to newspaper editor William Monroe Trotter. In 1918, she sang at a benefit concert to raise funds for "necessary comforts for the colored soldiers" serving in World War I.

Clough was also a soloist at church concerts, and taught voice students from her own studio in Worcester.

== Personal life ==
Pinckney married postal carrier Benjamin H. Clough in 1889; his sister Inez Clough was also a noted performer. They had a daughter, Harriet, who died from tuberculosis as a young woman in 1913. Clough died in 1929, in her sixties, in Worcester. She was buried in Hope Cemetery in Worcester.
