= Elizabeth Boyer =

Elizabeth Boyer may refer to:

- Elizabeth Boyer (actress) (1902–1946), played in The Sport of the Gods (1921) and featured on 2008 US postage stamp
- Elizabeth H. Boyer (born 1952), American fantasy author
- Elizabeth M. Boyer (1913–2002), American lawyer, feminist founder of Women's Equity Action League (WEAL), and writer
