= The Secret Sorrow =

1921 American film

- Written by: J.C. Brown
- Produced by: Robert Levy
- Color process: Black and white
- Production company: REOL Productions
- Release date: 1921
- Country: United States
- Language: Silent

The Secret Sorrow is a 1921 American silent race film with an all African American cast, produced by REOL Productions. It was written by J.C. Brown. It is a lost film as of October 2019, but a film clip is extant and was preserved by the University of Southern California HMH Foundation Moving Image Archive.

== History ==
Villa Lewaro, Irvington, New York

It was filmed at Villa Lewaro in Irvington-on-Hudson in New York state, a historic house where A'Lelia Walker had lived.

Actress Edna Morton was featured in an advertisement for the film that described it as a "heart-throbbing story of mother love." It also noted it was, "enacted by an all star cast of Colored Artists." Morton had starred in several REOL Productions films.

== Plot ==
The film is a dramatic account of an African American widow named Anne Morgan, and her two young sons, Arthur and Joe. The two brothers are adopted and raised apart in opposite living conditions, and they are unaware of their relationship. As adults the brothers are reunited when one brother is a prisoner and the other serves as his lawyer.

== Cast ==
- George Edward Brown, as Arthur Morgan
- Percy Verwayen, as Joe Morgan
- Lawrence Chenault, as Sam Dugan
- Edna Morton
- Henry Pleasant, as doctor
- J. H. Woodson
- Ida Anderson
- Inez Clough
