= Aubrey Bowser =

American writer and literary critic

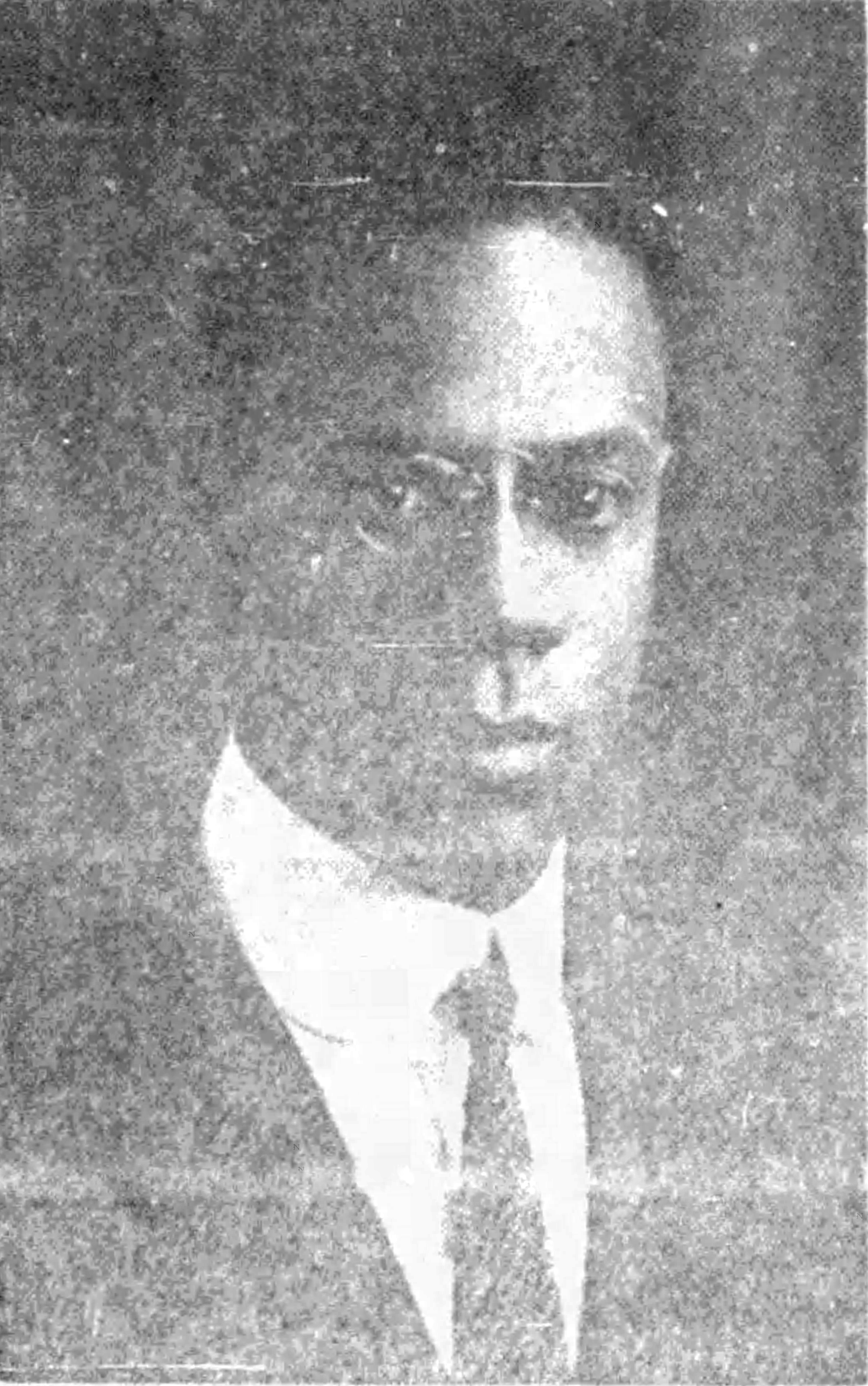
- Bowser c. 1921
- Born: Aubrey Howard Bowser; April 4, 1886 La Mott, Pennsylvania, US
- Died: February 12, 1980 (aged 93)
- Occupation: Literary critic, editor, author
- Education: Harvard College, 1907
- Notable works: The Man Who Would Be White

Aubrey Howard Bowser (April 4, 1886 – 1980) (Note: The New York Public Library holds the Aubrey Howard Bowser Papers donated by his daughter. The Social Security Administration lists his date of death as February 1980.) was an American writer, literary critic, and educator. He reviewed books for the New York Amsterdam News. His writings include a serialized novel, The Man Who Would Be White, which was made into the race film The Call of His People. He founded and edited literary magazine The Rainbow from 1919 to 1920. One of his pen names was Jane La Mott. He was the son-in-law of publisher and civil rights leader Timothy Thomas Fortune.

== Early life and education ==
Bowser was born in La Mott, Pennsylvania, a historically black community in Cheltenham Township. He came from a family of Pennsylvanians born in Montgomery County going back five generations. His grandfather William Bowser was one of the earliest black landowners in La Mott.

At age 12, Aubrey Bowser earned money as a newsie selling The Philadelphia Tribune. As a teenager, he published his poems in the literary column of Philadelphia Evening Bulletin.

In 1903, he graduated from Cheltenham High School as class orator and poet. As the first student from Cheltenham to be accepted to Harvard, he received a four-year scholarship funded by John Wanamaker.

Bowser received an A.B. degree from Harvard College in 1907. He was one of nine black students to graduate from Harvard that year. Later in life, he studied for a master's degree and completed a teaching qualification in New York City in 1943.

== Career ==
=== Early years ===
Upon finishing college, Bowser moved to New York City, hoping to pursue a career in journalism. In December 1907, he started writing for The New York Age, the African American newspaper founded by T. Thomas Fortune. After quitting due to differences with his editor, Bowser tried unsuccessfully to get hired as a reporter at any of the city's daily newspapers. Within a year of graduation, he found himself working as a porter at the New York Stock Exchange. For three years, he wrote short stories which he submitted to magazines, but was unable to get them published.

In 1913, Bowser started working as a government clerk in the United States Railway Mail Service after taking the civil service examinations. By 1917, he was promoted to clerk-in-charge of six mail trains operating between New York City and Croton-on-Hudson, New York. He remained with the railway mail service for six years before resigning to start his own magazine.

=== The Rainbow ===
In 1919, Bowser launched his literary magazine, The Rainbow: A Weekly Magazine of Song and Story. Affiliated with the Salem Methodist Episcopal Church, the magazine was designated its "official organ". The October 23 issue that year featured a profile of its pastor, Frederick Asbury Cullen. A recurring section, "You Can Do It Too", included biographies of African American journalists, clergymen, entrepreneurs, and others who were successful in their professions. Many of the short stories in The Rainbow were romances which also promoted sobriety and entrepreneurship to advance the black community.

In the aftermath of the Red Summer of 1919, Bowser condemned lynching as an existential threat to the United States. In his editorial, "Letter to the Pulpits" in the January 8, 1920 issue of The Rainbow, Bowser denounced white churches for their silence after the lynching of African-American World War I veterans. The Rainbow folded in 1920 due to a paper shortage after World War I. Editions of it are available online.

=== Fiction writing ===
By 1922, Bowser had written and published two serial novels: The Iron Altar and The Man Who Would Be White. He originally wrote The Iron Altar for The Rainbow, and later republished an edited version of the story with the title "The Vamp and the Virgin" in the Baltimore Afro-American, the New York Amsterdam News, and the Norfolk Journal and Guide.

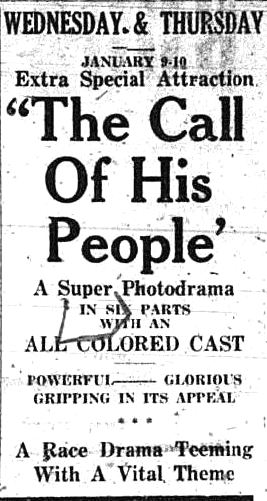
Advertisement for showings of The Call of His People

The Man Who Would Be White (1919) became the basis for the 1921 race film The Call of His People, produced by REOL Productions. In the story, the protagonist Nelson Holmes passes as white for more than 20 years before confessing to his employer and the woman he loves that he is black. Bowser originally published The Man Who Would Be White under the pseudonym Jane La Mott.

Several of Bowser's short stories were syndicated in African American weekly newspapers. "Toosaynte Lee Ovachoo Brown", a series of satirical short stories, was published in the Baltimore Afro-American, Cleveland Call and Post, and Washington Bee. In July 1926, Bowser's detective novella "Who Killed the King of the New York Underworld?" was published in the Amsterdam News. His other published works included "The Naughty Calantha" which appeared in the Afro-American in October 1928, and "The Arrow of Scandal" in the Pittsburgh Courier in December 1928.

=== Amsterdam News ===
In the 1920s, Bowser began writing book reviews and literary criticism for the New York Amsterdam News, then considered the best local black newspaper in the country, according to journalist Eugene Gordon. Bowser sometimes assisted editor-in-chief William Kelly in writing editorials for the paper. In 1929, Bowser became city editor at the Amsterdam News.

=== Teaching ===
Bowser worked as an English teacher in the New York City public school system. He received his license to teach in New York City high schools in 1943. One of the schools where he taught was New York Vocational High School, where he became dean.

== Notable works ==
=== Serial novels ===
- The Iron Altar
- The Man Who Would Be White

=== Short story series ===
- "Toosaynte Lee Ovachoo Brown"

== Personal life and legacy ==
Bowser married Jessie Fortune, the daughter of T. Thomas Fortune, in 1912. They had four children, including one who died as an infant.

He died in 1980. The manuscript for his unpublished novel Black Pilgrim: A Novel of Harlem's Early Life is part of the Aubrey Howard Bowser papers donated by his daughter Elizabeth Bowser to the New York Public Library.
