= The Simp (1921 film) =

1921 American film

- Color process: Black and white
- Production company: REOL Productions
- Distributed by: States Rights Independent Exchanges
- Release date: 1921
- Country: United States
- Language: Silent

The Simp is a 1921 American silent comedy race film, produced by REOL Productions. It is a 35 mm black and white feature. It starred Sherman H. Dudley Jr., Inez Clough, Edna Morton, and Percy Verwayen. The film is presumed lost.

== Cast ==
- Sherman H. Dudley Jr. (credited S.H. Dudley Jr.)
- Inez Clough
- Edna Morton
- Alex K. Shannon
- Percy Verwayen
