= Three Miles Out =

1924 film

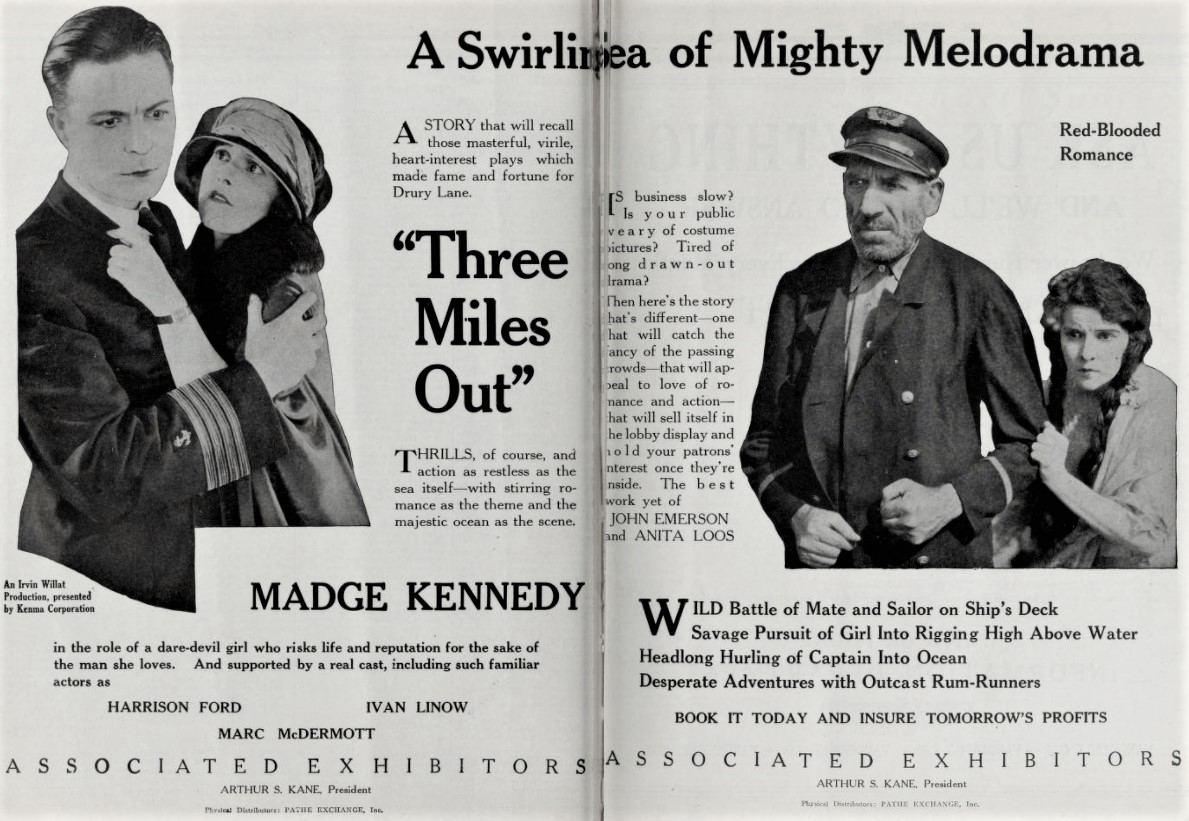
- Advertisement
- Directed by: Irvin Willat
- Written by: John Emerson; Anita Loos
- Story by: Neysa McMein
- Starring: Madge Kennedy; Harrison Ford; Marc McDermott
- Cinematography: Henry Cronjager
- Production company: Kenma Corporation
- Distributed by: Associated Exhibitors
- Release date: February 10, 1924
- Running time: 60 minutes
- Country: United States
- Language: Silent (English intertitles)

Three Miles Out is a 1924 American silent drama film directed by Irvin Willat and starring Madge Kennedy, Harrison Ford, and Marc McDermott. The title of the film refers to the three-mile limit which formerly defined the territorial waters of the United States.

== Plot ==
As described in a film magazine review, Molly Townsend is on the eve of her marriage to Luis Riccardi, a steamship man who secretly is a bootlegger. She follows John Locke, the man she really loves, on a steamship bound for Rio. He is thrown overboard, leaving her at the mercy of a crew full of bad men. She is nearly their victim when she is rescued by John and her mother. When the police come aboard, the leader of the band reveals the true character of Riccardi, leaving Molly and John happy together.

== Cast ==
- Madge Kennedy as Molly Townsend
- Harrison Ford as John Locke
- Marc McDermott as Luis Riccardi
- Ivan Linow as 'Bull' Jordan
- Walter P. Lewis as 'Smoothy' Smith
- M.W. Rale as 'Highbrow' Higgins
- Joseph Henderson as Dadny
- Edna Morton as Susie
- Marie Burke as Mrs. Ormsby Townsend

== Preservation ==
A complete print of Three Miles Out is held by the Gosfilmofond archive in Moscow.

== Bibliography ==
- Munden, Kenneth White. The American Film Institute Catalog of Motion Pictures Produced in the United States, Part 1. University of California Press, 1997.
