= Dark Tower (building) =

Townhouse in New York City, 1916 to 1941

Coordinates: 40°48′54″N 73°56′28″W

The Dark Tower was a townhouse on 108-110 West 136th Street in Harlem, Manhattan, New York City.

== History ==
Madam C.J. Walker commissioned Villa Lewaro in 1916 and began the final stage of construction on another residential/business property associated with the name Dark Tower a year prior (concurrently, private space rentals within the building were being advertised under the name 'Walker Studio'), with the Dark Tower name having originated from poet Countee Cullen's eponymous column in Opportunity Magazine. The Dark Tower space originally consisted of two combined townhouses at 108 and 110 West 136th Street in Harlem, New York. The building still hosted retail operations on the ground floor, being distinctly separate from the cultural enlightenment starting to percolate the site based on heightened awareness. During the 1920s Harlem Renaissance, this Neo-Georgian styled mansion expanded to become the popular salon tête-à-tête officially embraced as Dark Tower, with invited visitors such as Langston Hughes, Zora Neale Hurston, W.E.B. Du Bois, Muriel Draper, Nora Holt, Witter Bynner, Andy Razaf, Taylor Gordon, Carl Van Vechten, Clarence Darrow, Alberta Hunter, and James Weldon Johnson. Eventually, following Walker's death, the mansion was leased to New York City, which repurposed the site to function as a health care clinic triage facility. Finally, in 1941, the mansion was demolished, being replaced with the Countee Cullen Branch of the New York Public Library.

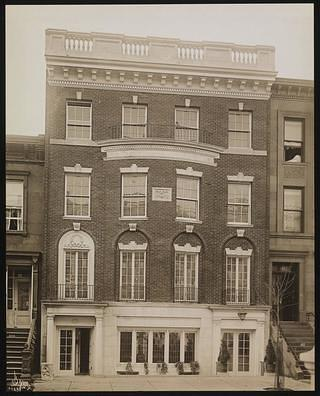
Madame C. J. Walker's Dark Tower Estate
