= Kerby Jean-Raymond =

American fashion designer (born 1986)

- Born: November 2, 1986 (age 39); East Flatbush, New York City, U.S.
- Education: Hofstra University
- Label: Pyer Moss

Kerby Jean-Raymond (born 1986) is a Haitian American fashion designer, the founder and creative director of the New York label Pyer Moss, which he started in 2013. His runway presentations combine clothing with live performance and with commentary on race in the United States.

He drew wide attention with a September 2015 show, presented during New York Fashion Week, that addressed police brutality, and between 2018 and 2019 staged "American, Also", a three-part series of collections on the place of Black Americans in national culture. He won the CFDA/Vogue Fashion Fund in 2018 and was named American Menswear Designer of the Year at the 2020 CFDA Fashion Awards. He was global creative director of Reebok between 2020 and 2022, and in July 2021 became the first Black American designer to present on the official Paris haute couture schedule.

== Early life and education ==
Jean-Raymond was born in 1986 and grew up in the East Flatbush neighborhood of Brooklyn, New York. His father, Jean-Claude Jean-Raymond, emigrated from Haiti to the United States in 1980 and worked as a taxi driver and later as an electrical technician. His mother, Vania Moss-Pierre, died in a house fire during a trip to Haiti when Jean-Raymond was seven, and he was raised by his father. The label Pyer Moss takes its name from her: Moss was her maiden name, and Pyer is a spelling of Pierre, the surname of a cousin already in the United States that she used on her immigration paperwork.

Jean-Raymond began designing at a young age. He landed his first apprenticeship at 14 while still attending The High School of Fashion Industries in Manhattan. He started his first fashion label, Mary's Jungle at the age of 15. Taught by Kay Unger, Jean-Raymond worked on Unger's first women's evening collection.

He launched Pyer Moss in 2013. Jean-Raymond uses his brand to address racial tensions in the United States and intertwine social issues with the fashion world. He describes his brand, Pyer Moss, as an "art project" or "a timely social experiment" at times.

Jean-Raymond took his first job at 13, at a Flatbush sneaker store, and interned at Marchesa and Theory while at the High School of Fashion Industries. He graduated from Hofstra University with a business degree and then enrolled at Brooklyn Law School, leaving after a semester. He worked at AT&T and did freelance design for Marc Jacobs, Theory and Kenneth Cole before founding Pyer Moss in 2013 with an initial investment of $35,000 from his former business partner Rayon Baker.

== Career ==
Kerby Jean-Raymond first came into the spotlight for his presentation of Pyer Moss' Spring 2016 Menswear Collection during New York Fashion Week. The show highlighted police brutality, referencing the Black Lives Matter movement through videos, street art, and fashion. Jean-Raymond has publicly commented about his experience as a teenage victim of driving while black. Kerby Jean-Raymond collaborated with R&B singer and activist Erykah Badu, who styled Jean-Raymond's Pyer Moss AW16 line for the 2016 New York Fashion Week show. The featured collection was titled "Double Bind."

The show took place at the Altman Building in Manhattan on September 10, 2015, and opened with a twelve-minute film, This Is an Intervention, combining footage of police violence with interviews with relatives of men who had been killed. Jean-Raymond seated family members of Sean Bell and Eric Garner in the front row, moving some fashion editors further back; several then declined to attend. Garments carried Garner's words "I can't breathe". The collection nearly ended the label: several stores dropped the line and Jean-Raymond received death threats. He was at the same time trying to buy the business back from an investment partner, and said he sold most of his possessions to raise money before a deal with Reebok let him regain control of the company.

His brand, Pyer Moss, won the Fashion Group International Rising Star Award in the menswear category in 2014, sharing the prize with the designer Ian Velardi. That same year, he was a finalist in the DHL Exported Prize presented by IMG Worldwide. He was named to the Forbes "30 Under 30" list in the Art and Style category in 2015. Jean-Raymond was featured on Cultured Magazine's fashion issue cover in April 2019.

During Paris Fashion Week in February 2019, Odell Beckham Jr. wore a Pyer Moss Collection 2 hoodie. Others seen in Pyer Moss include producer Swizz Beatz, Kiandra Layne, Gabrielle Union-Wade, Colin Kaepernick and First Lady Michelle Obama.

In September 2020, Jean-Raymond was named Global Creative Director of Reebok sportswear brand. Pyer Moss had won the top prize at the fifteenth CFDA/Vogue Fashion Fund awards in November 2018, receiving $400,000 and a year of mentorship from an industry executive. In early 2022, he departed Reebok.

=== "American, Also" (2018–2019) ===
Between 2018 and 2019, Jean-Raymond presented "American, Also", a three-part series of collections about the place of Black Americans in national culture. The first, in February 2018, drew on the history of Black cowboys and included his first womenswear alongside collaborations with Reebok and the 1990s label Cross Colours. The second, in September 2018 at the Weeksville Heritage Center in Brooklyn, imagined everyday Black American life without racism, with a forty-member choir, artwork by Derrick Adams, a collaboration with FUBU and a shirt reading "Stop Calling 911 on the Culture".

Jean-Raymond skipped New York Fashion Week in February 2019, telling The New York Times that he had something to say but was not yet ready to say it. The final part, "Sister", was presented at the Kings Theatre in Flatbush in September 2019 before an audience of 3,000, and was built around Sister Rosetta Tharpe and the contribution of Black women to American popular music. It was a collaboration with Sean John and reportedly cost $400,000 to stage.

=== Pyer Moss couture (2021) ===
In February 2021, Jean-Raymond was invited by the Fédération de la Haute Couture et de la Mode to show during Paris Couture Week, making him the first Black American designer on the official haute couture calendar. Rather than show in Paris, he staged the collection, titled "Wat U Iz", at Villa Lewaro, the Irvington, New York, estate built by Madam C. J. Walker. A storm on July 8 forced a postponement, and organizers in Paris extended the couture calendar so that the show could go ahead on July 10. The garments were sculptural pieces modelled on objects invented by Black Americans, among them a jar of peanut butter, a lampshade and an air-conditioning unit. The presentation opened with a speech by Elaine Brown, a former chairwoman of the Black Panther Party.

=== Business difficulties (2021–2022) ===
Pyer Moss produced little after the couture show. In a January 2023 investigation for The Cut, Tahirah Hairston reported that the label had no store and no functioning online shop, that several runway collections had never been manufactured for sale, and that Jean-Raymond had laid off most of his staff in December 2021 and again in August 2022. Kering, which had invested in Pyer Moss, said through a spokesperson that it had not audited the company and that its relationship with Jean-Raymond was unchanged. Jean-Raymond disputed the account, saying the brand regularly sold clothing, bags and footwear from its runway shows, that fashion houses do not put everything shown on a runway into production, and that the suggestion that investment had been misused was false.
