= Lafayette Theatre (Harlem) =

Theater in Manhattan, New York (1912–51)

Coordinates: 40.81339°N 73.94487°W

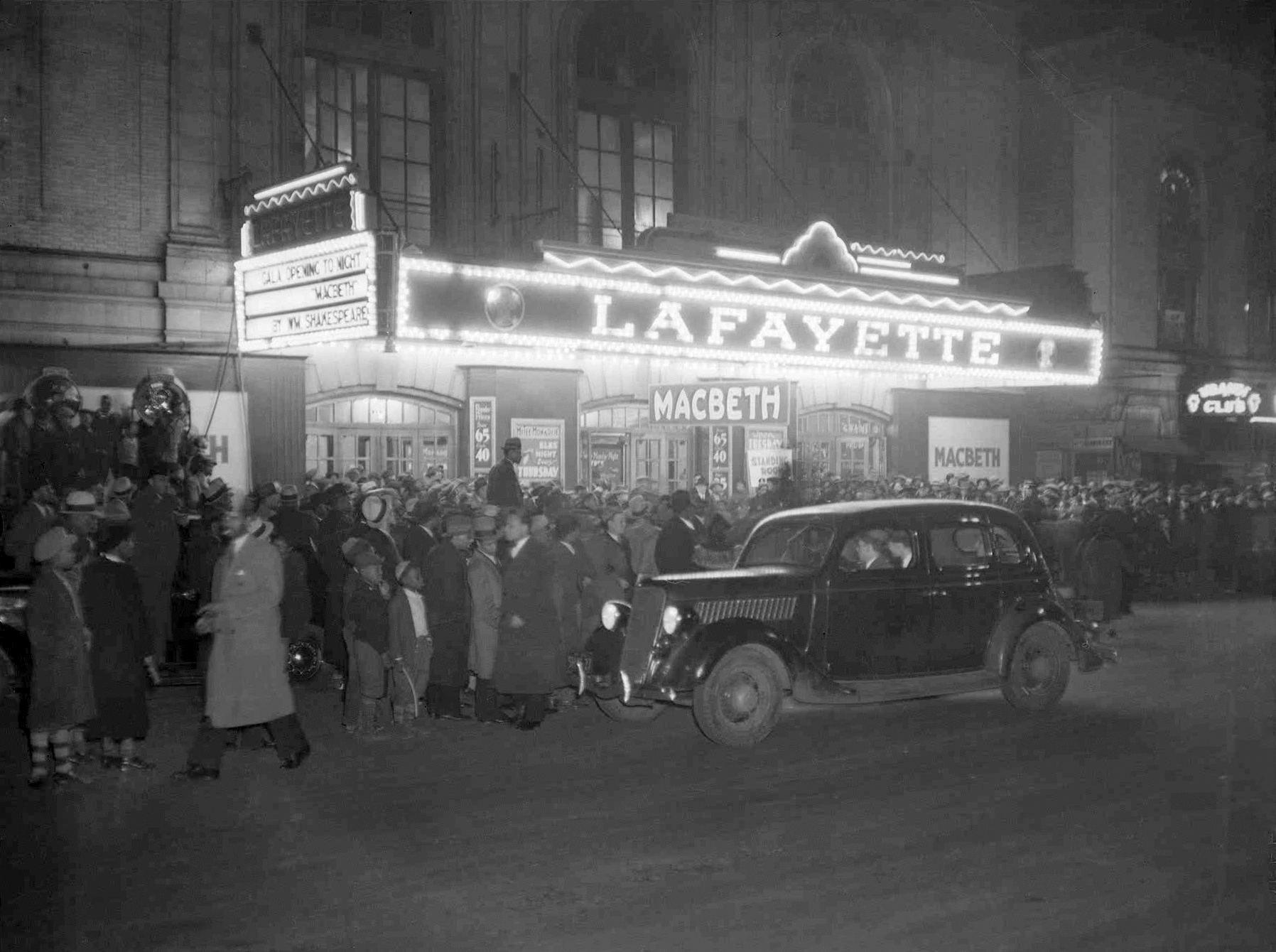
- Opening of Macbeth (April 14, 1936)
- Interactive map of Lafayette Theatre
- Address: 2225 Seventh Avenue; New York City, New York; United States

Construction
- Opened: 1912
- Demolished: 2013
- Years active: 1912–1951
- Architect: Victor Hugo Koehler

The Lafayette Theatre (1912–1951), known locally as "the House Beautiful", was one of the most famous theaters in the Harlem neighborhood of Manhattan in New York City. It was an entertainment venue located at 132nd Street and 7th Avenue. The first major theatre in New York to desegregate its seating amongst the crowd. In its early history the theatre was home to the African American repertory theatre company the Lafayette Players. This group was originally founded by Anita Bush as Anita Bush Stock Company in 1914 and became a part of the Lafayette Theatre in 1916 when the theatre bought the stock company. The Lafayette Players was a successful company from the 1910s through the 1930s; after which the company floundered. In 1951 the theatre closed and was sold to the Williams Institutional Christian Methodist Episcopal Church. The structure was demolished in 2013.

== Early years ==
The Lafayette Theatre was a 1,500-seat two-story theater built by banker Meyer Jarmulowsky that opened in November 1912. Located at 132nd Street and 7th Avenue, it was designed in the Renaissance style by architect Victor Hugo Koehler, who also designed the two three-story buildings flanking the theater on the corners of 131st and 132nd Streets.

In 1913 the Lafayette became the first major theater to desegregate. African-American theatergoers were allowed to sit in orchestra seats instead of the balcony, to which they were relegated in other New York theaters. The show that became known as Darktown Follies was staged in 1913 helping popularize at least two dances and helping bring white theatergoers uptown.

=== Lafayette Players ===
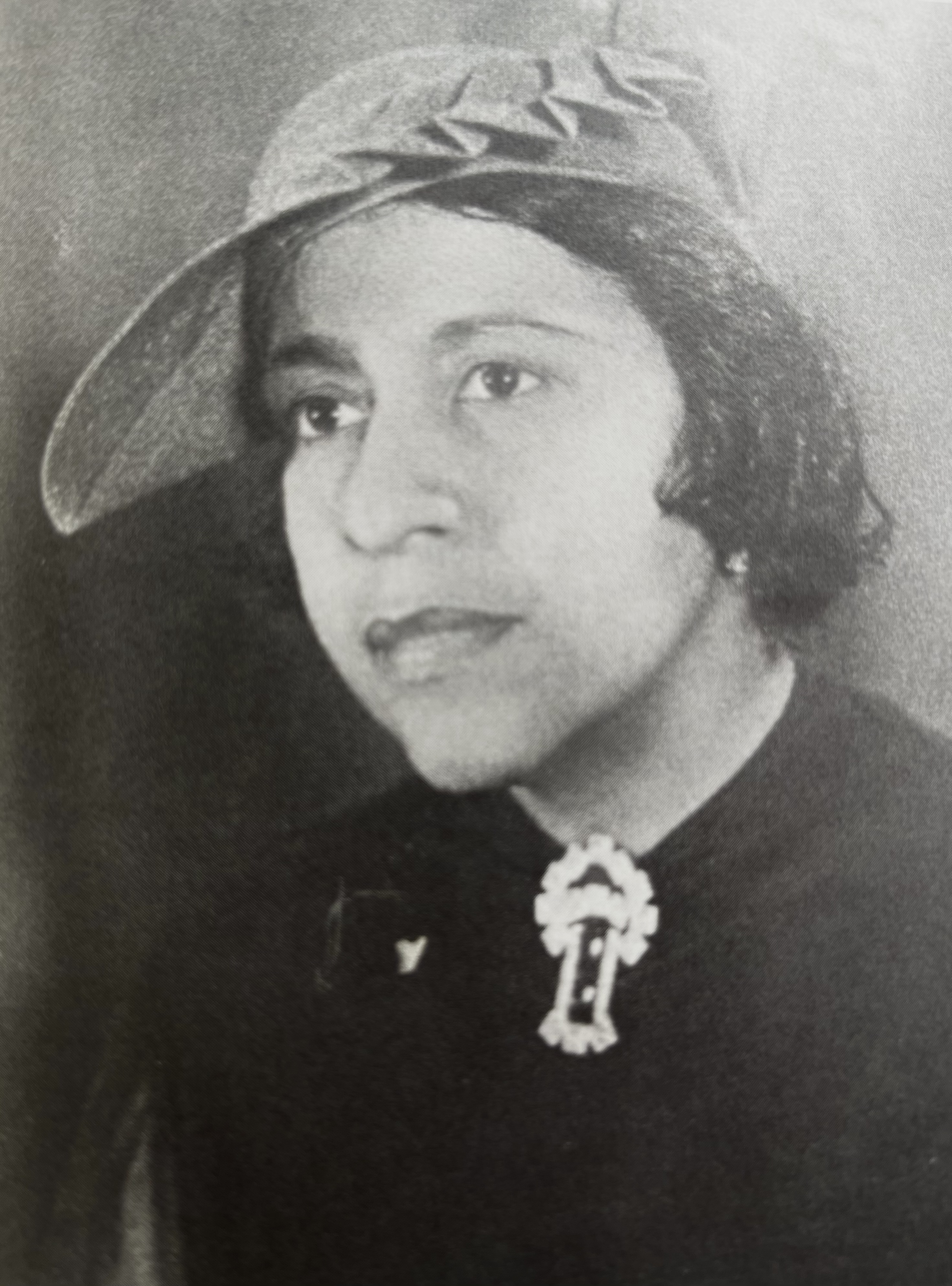
Anita Bush, 1937

The Lafayette Players, the Lafayette Theatre's resident stock company, began its life separate from the Lafayette Theatre as the Anita Bush Stock Company (ABSC), later known as the Anita Bush All-Colored Dramatic Stock Company. ASBC had been founded in 1914 or 1915, when Anita Bush, a former dancer, approached Marie Downs and Eugene Elmore of the Lincoln Theatre, obtained a contract with them for a new stock company to perform at the theatre. Bush then gathered African American actors, including Charles Sidney Gilpin, Carlotta Freeman, and Andrew S. Bishop, to form the Anita Bush Stock Company. Bush staged the company's first play within two weeks.

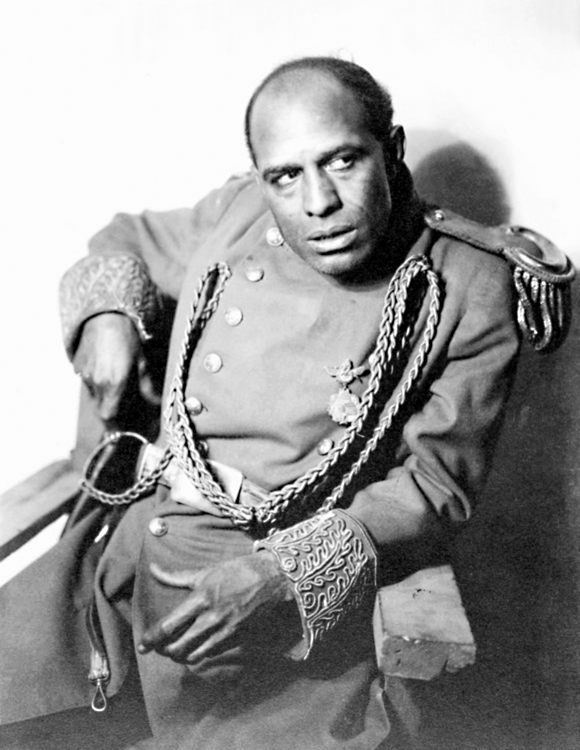
Photograph of Charles S. Gilpin in The Emperor Jones, 1920

In March 1916, Bush sold her company to the Lafayette Theatre, which renamed the company The Lafayette Players. Gilpin began to manage company. Bush then organized four additional companies of the Lafayette Players which toured throughout the United States.

At the Lincoln Theatre, the Players performed a different play each week. Bush eventually sold her remaining rights to the company to her co-manager Lester Walton. Bush is credited with launching the careers of Gilpin, Dooley Wilson and Evelyn Preer at the company. She remained with the company until 1920, when she left to pursue a career in film.

Also in 1916, Jewish theater producer Robert Levy became involved with the Lafayette Players through the formation of the Quality Amusement Corporation, which managed both the theater and the acting troupe. Later, Levy cast members of the company in movies of his production company REOL Productions. The company consisted entirely of black actors playing serious dramatic roles, an innovation of the time. White playwrights, who intended to have white actors playing them, wrote many of these roles. This allowed serious black actors transcend the stereotyped and comedic roles they were normally expected to play.

The Lafayette Players performed for almost exclusively Black audiences. They staged classic shows, as well as shows that were popular in white theater repertory, including Madame X, Dr. Jekyll and Mr. Hyde, and The Octoroon. The company staged a performance of Othello starring E.S. Wright and Margaret Brown around the 300th anniversary of the death of William Shakespeare. The Players performed short plays and shortened versions of popular Broadway shows, most of which were melodramatic. They performed popular musicals including Darktown and Shuffle Along. Some Harlem figures, like W. E. B. Du Bois, opposed this choice of materials because it did not promote the work of black playwrights.

=== People ===
Prominent African American actors in the company included Laura Bowman, Sydney Kirkpatrick, Edna Morton, Lawrence Chenault, Canada Lee, Rose McClendon, Oscar Micheaux, Lionel Monagas, Clarence Muse, and Charles S. Gilpin. Composer James P. Johnson and director Edgar Forrest also worked with the company.

== Management ==
Arts critic, producer and Broadway composer Lester Walton worked as manager and dramatic lyricist for the theater from 1914 to 1916 and from 1919 to 1921.

From 1916 to 1919, the theatre was managed by Quality Amusement, an entertainment business owned by producer Robert Levy. The theater drew large audiences of both Blacks and whites with his sophisticated productions and groundbreaking work with Black actors.

== Jazz performers ==
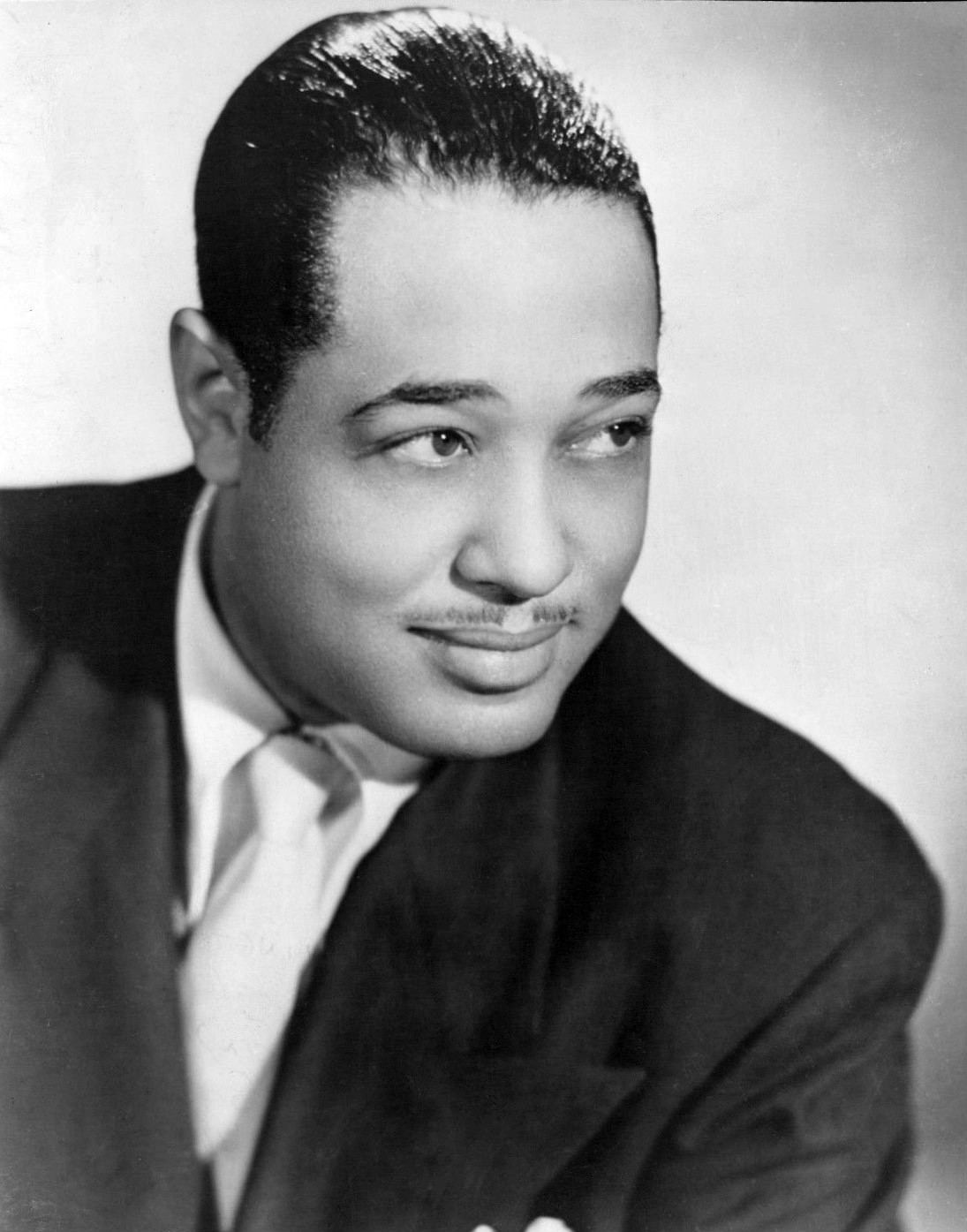
Duke Ellington in 1946.

In 1923, Duke Ellington made his New York debut while performing in Wilbur Sweatman's band at the Lafayette, and later performed with his own group at the venue. This was all due to producer/director Leonard Harper who Ellington lived with as a boarder in his larger Harlem apartment at the time. Ellington and his orchestra also appeared at the Lafayette in October 1927 with the singer Adelaide Hall in the show Jazz Mania. It was in this show that the song Creole Love Call was a first introduced to the public. Other jazz musicians who performed at the Lafayette include Fletcher Henderson, Bennie Moten, Chick Webb, and Zutty Singleton. Harlem Renaissance playwright Eulalie Spence's play On Being Forty premiered at the Lafayette Theatre on October 15, 1924. Although the play was never published, the Lafayette performance was reviewed by George S. Schuyler, providing all that is presently known about the play, as no extant copies have been found. Schuyler would later become known as "the most prominent African American journalist and essayist of the early twentieth century."

== Federal Theatre Project ==
The Lafayette Theatre reached the height of its fame with the Voodoo Macbeth, a production of Shakespeare's Macbeth, adapted and staged by Orson Welles that ran April 14 – June 20, 1936. This show had an all African-American cast. It was a production of the Federal Theatre Project which was part of the Works Project Administration. The overture was by James P. Johnson and such notable actors as Canada Lee and Rose McClendon were part of the program. The production was universally known in advance as the "Voodoo Macbeth" because the setting was changed from Scotland to a fictional Caribbean island based on Haiti, and acquired its nickname due to its use of voodoo imagery in place of the witchcraft in the original play.

In 1951 the building was acquired by Williams Institutional Christian Methodist Episcopal Church. The original facade was replaced in 1990, to the distress of advocates of historic preservation.

The building was demolished in 2013, replaced by an eight-story apartment building called the Lafayette.

=== WPA Federal Theatre posters ===
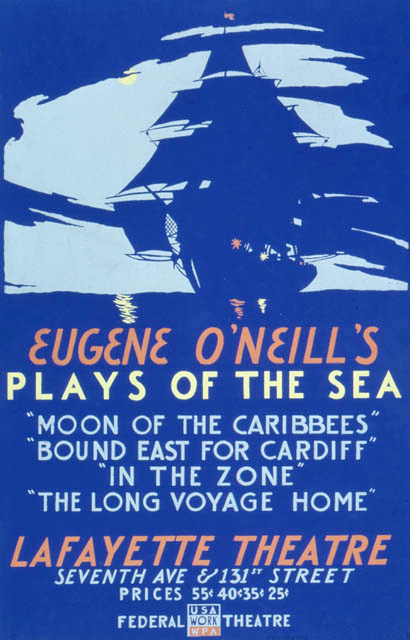

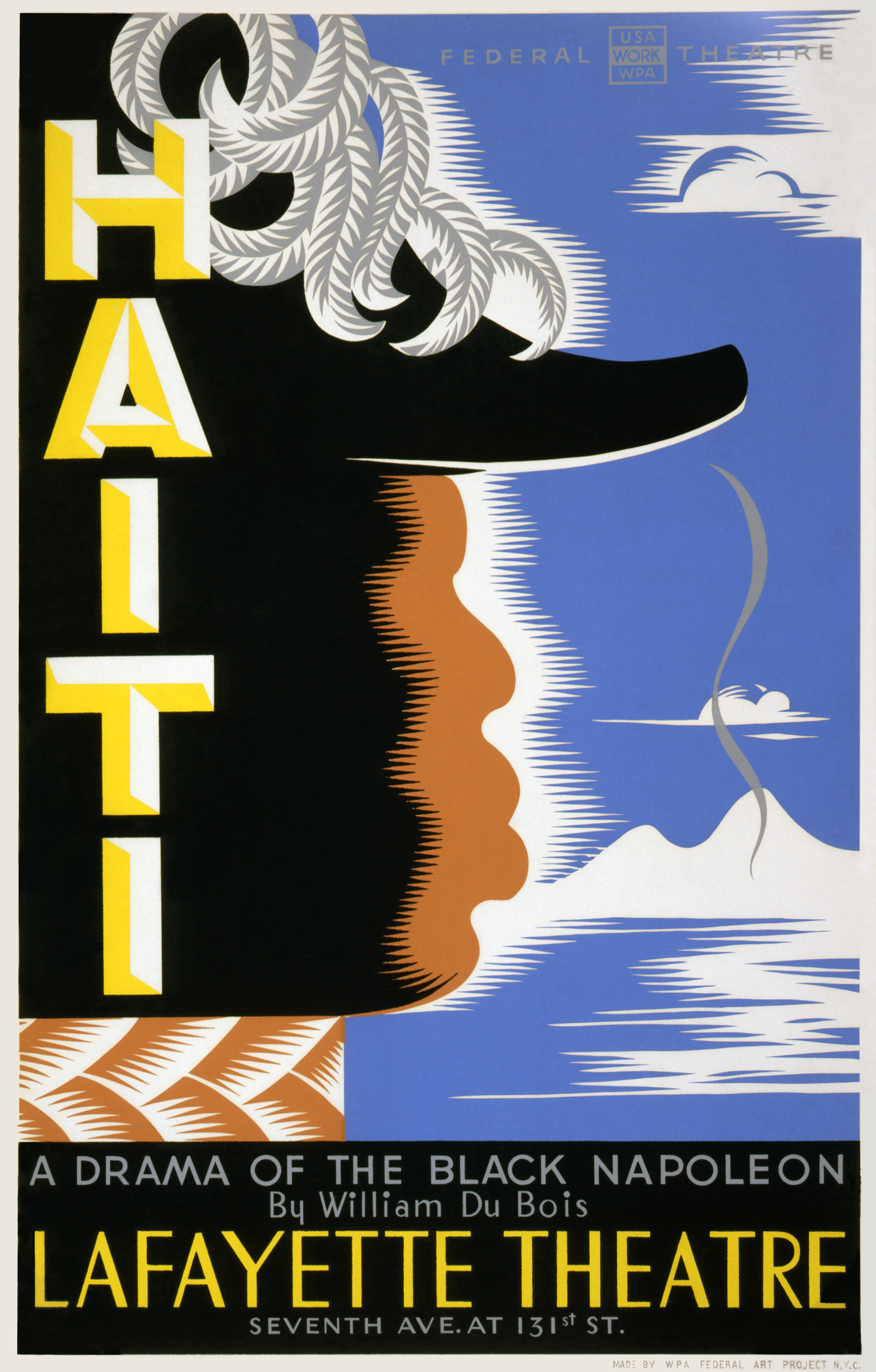

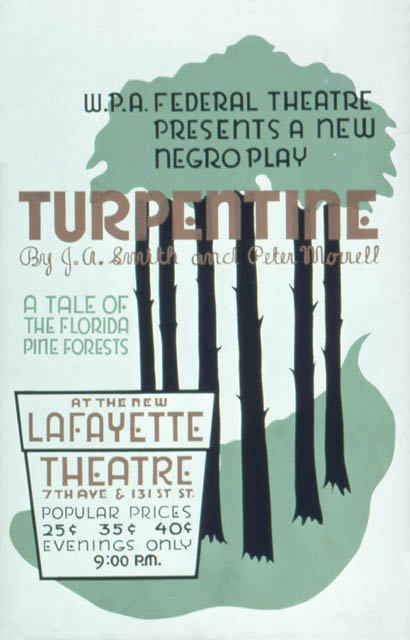

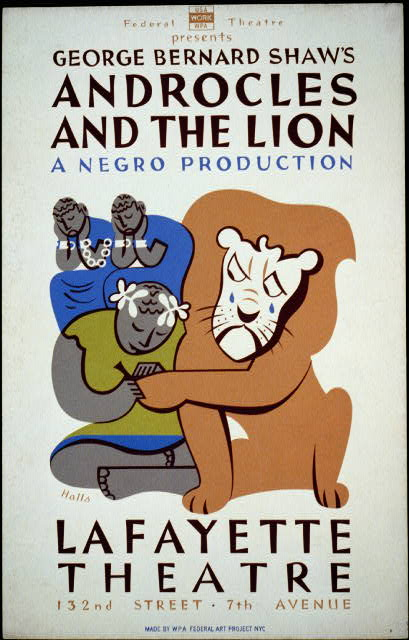

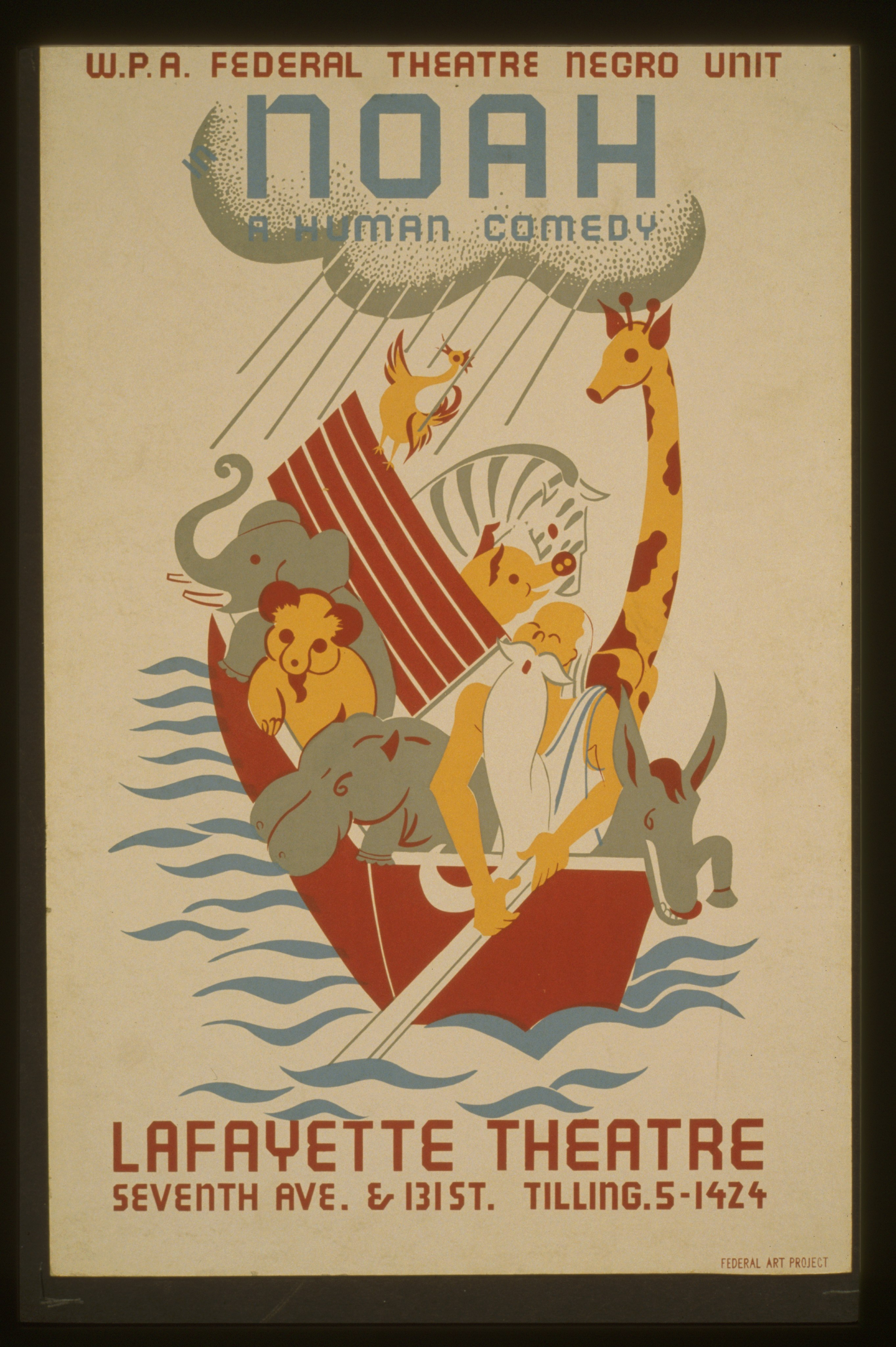

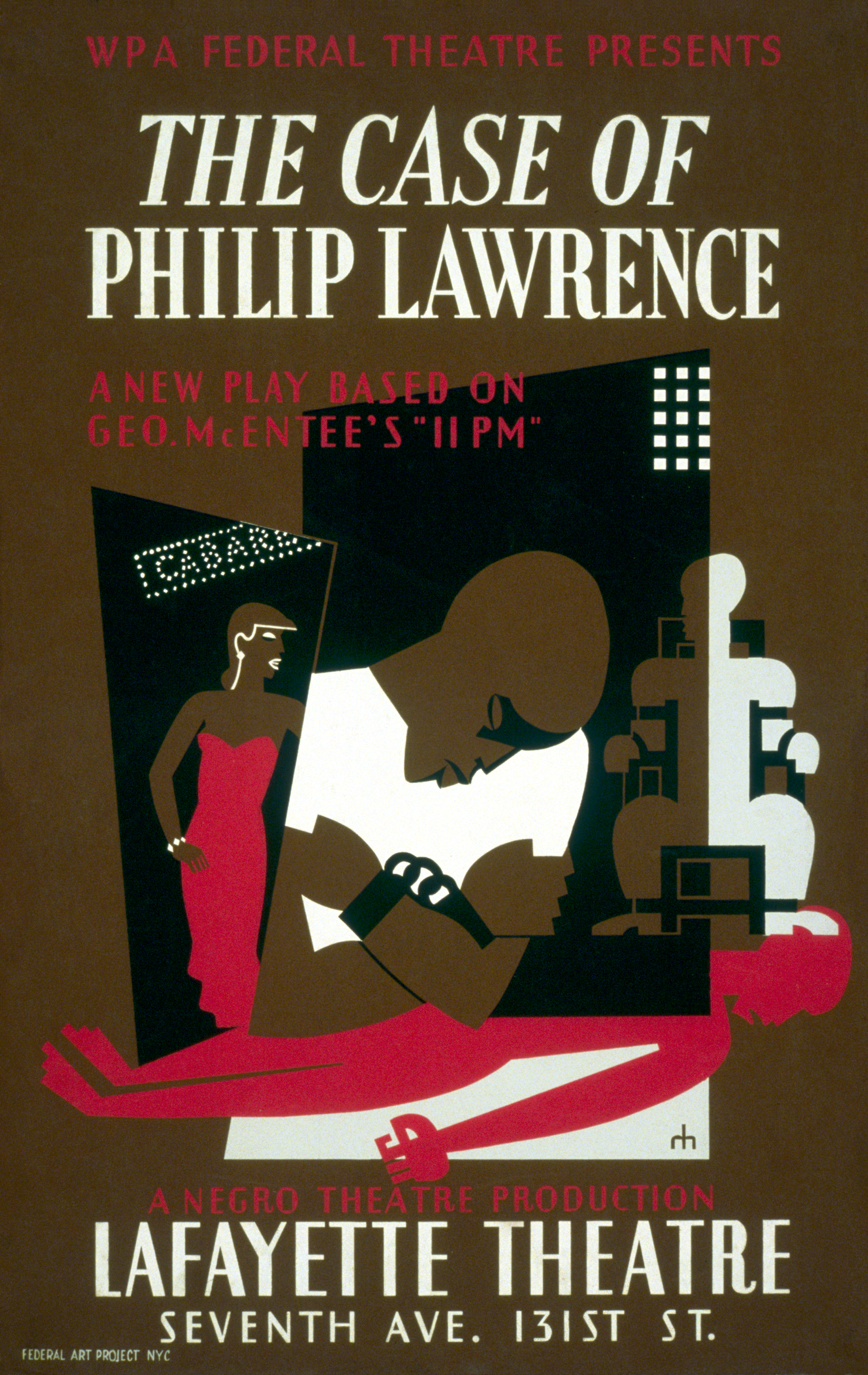

== Bibliography ==
- Cullen, Frank; with Hackman, Florence; and McNeilly, Donald. "Lafayette Theatre in Harlem", Vaudeville Old & New: An Encyclopedia of Variety Performers in America (New York: Routledge Taylor & Francis Group, 2007):643
- Dunlap, David W. "Williams Institutional C. M. E. Church", From Abyssinian to Zion (New York: Columbia University Press, 2004):294}}
