= Body and Soul (1925 film) =

1925 film directed by Oscar Micheaux

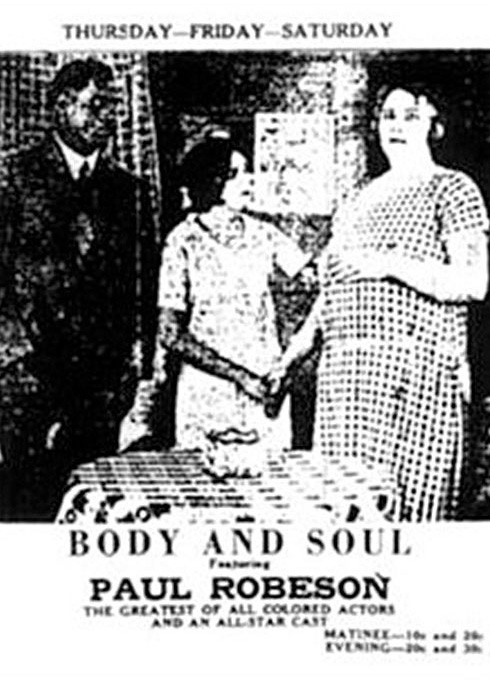
- Theatrical release poster
- Directed by: Oscar Micheaux
- Written by: Oscar Micheaux (novel and screenplay)
- Produced by: Oscar Micheaux
- Starring: Paul Robeson; Mercedes Gilbert; Julia Theresa Russell
- Distributed by: Micheaux Film Corporation
- Release date: November 9, 1925
- Running time: 102 minutes
- Country: United States
- Languages: Silent film English intertitles

Body and Soul is a 1925 race film produced, written, directed, and distributed by Oscar Micheaux and starring Paul Robeson in his motion picture debut. In 2019, the film was selected by the Library of Congress for preservation in the National Film Registry for being "culturally, historically, or aesthetically significant".

== Plot ==
Body and Soul (1925)

An escaped convict finds refuge in the predominantly African-American town of Tatesville, Georgia, by passing himself off as the Rt. Reverend Isaiah T. Jenkins.

Jenkins is joined in town by a fellow criminal, and the pair scheme to swindle the phony reverend's congregation of their offerings. Jenkins takes a fancy to a young member of his congregation, Isabelle Perkins, even though she is in love with a poor young man named Sylvester, who happens to be Jenkins' long-estranged identical twin brother. Martha Jane, Isabelle's mother, schemes to marry her daughter to the reverend, and leaves them alone together. On her return, Isabelle is in tears. Later, Isabelle flees to Atlanta, apparently with her mother's savings.

Months later she dies in poverty, just as her mother locates her. Before dying, Isabelle reveals to her mother that Jenkins had raped her and that he was the one who took her mother's money, and convinced the young woman to take the blame for his crime. She explains that she did not speak up before because she knew her mother would not believe her accusations against a man of God. Returning to Tatesville, Martha Jane confronts Jenkins in front of the congregation. Jenkins flees and during a twilight struggle he kills a man who tries to bring him to justice.

Suddenly, Martha Jane awakens and realizes the whole episode with Jenkins was only a dream. She provides Isabelle, who is not dead, and Sylvester with the funds to start a married life together.

== Cast ==
- Paul Robeson as Rt. Reverend Isaiah T. Jenkins / his brother Sylvester
- Mercedes Gilbert as Sister Martha Jane - Isabelle's mother
- Julia Theresa Russell as Isabelle - the girl
- Lawrence Chenault as Yello-Curley' Hinds - the phony reverend's former jailmate
- Marshall Rogers as speakeasy proprietor
- Lillian Johnson as "Sis" Caline, a pious Lady
- Madame Robinson as "Sis" Lucy, a pious Lady
- Chester A. Alexander as Deacon Simpkins, a church elder
- Walter Cornick as Brother Amos, a church elder

== Production ==
Paul Robeson made his film debut at the age of 27 in Body and Soul, playing the dual role of Jenkins and Sylvester. As part of the agreement to star in the film, Robeson received a $100 per week salary plus three percent of the gross after the first $40,000 in receipts.

Julia Theresa Russell (1898–2000) was the younger sister of Alice B. Russell, who was married to Oscar Micheaux. This is her sole known film appearance.

== Release ==
The original version of Body and Soul was a nine-reel production. When the filmmaker applied for an exhibition license from the Motion Picture Commission of the State of New York, it was denied approval on the grounds it would "tend to incite to crime" and was "immoral" and "sacrilegious". Micheaux was forced to re-edit the film twice before the commission approved the film, which was reduced from nine to five reels. The surviving copy of Body and Soul is based on this edited version; Micheaux's director cut is considered a lost film. Body and Soul is one of three surviving silent films created by Micheaux, who is credited with making 26 silent productions. On aggregate film site Rotten Tomatoes, Body and Soul holds an 86% approval rating based on 7 reviews.

Body and Soul was originally released to cinemas catering to an exclusive African-American audience, and for many years the film was unknown to white moviegoers. In 2000, Body and Soul was presented at the New York Film Festival with a new musical score composed by trombonist Wycliffe Gordon and performed live by the Lincoln Center Jazz Orchestra.

Body and Soul was released on home video in 2016 by Kino Lorber as part of the five-disc Pioneers of African-American Cinema set.
