= Robert Levy (producer) =

English-born American theater manager, film producer (1888–1959)

- Born: 1888; London, England
- Died: 1959 (aged 70–71)
- Occupations: Theater manager, film producer.

Robert Levy (1888–1959) was an English-born American theater manager and film producer. Levy was the general manager of the Lafayette Players at the Lafayette Theatre in Harlem, overseeing the production of more than one hundred stage plays featuring black actors. He founded REOL Productions, and was one of the earliest producers of race films, overseeing the production of twelve silent films featuring all-black casts. His specialized in "high class" films with well known actors and adaptations of works by African American writers such as Paul Laurence Dunbar.

== Early life ==
Levy was born to Jewish parents in London in 1888. In the late 19th century, the family immigrated to the United States where Levy was educated in the New York City public school system. In his early twenties, he found a job managing the American division of the Éclair Film Company, a leading French producer of film.

== Management career ==
In 1916, the Lafayette Theater in Harlem, featuring the Lafayette Players, a company of Black actors, vaudevillians and entertainers, was growing and in need of strong management. Robert Levy, who had entered the field of Black entertainment with the Quality Amusement Company, was hired for this role. Charged with selecting plays, mounting shows and managing the travelling troupes as well as bookings at other theatres, Levy focused his efforts on turning the theatre into a site of quality productions. He produced all-Black cast versions of notable plays such as Madame X and Dr.Jekyll and Mr. Hyde, a breakthrough for Black actors to perform in roles they were never offered before. His insistence on high production value and respectful treatment of Blacks earned him initial acclaim from the public and press, but he nevertheless faced too many battles for his success to last long. Lester Walton, a popular Black film critic and theatrical manager himself, criticised Levy for holding a position that he felt rightfully belonged to a Black man. After producing more than 100 plays with all-Black casts, and under pressure from Black newspaper sources, Levy left the theatre in 1919, determined to devote his efforts to Black film, thereafter called race films.

== Film career ==
As with his theatre productions, Levy wanted his films to be of the highest calibre, highlighting Blacks as serious actors with notable talent. In January 1921, he established Reol Films. He adapted work from black writers. Over the next few years he produced nine feature-length films and two documentaries. They featured Black actors such as Clarence Muse, Lawrence Chenault, Andrew S. Bishop, Sherman Dudley, Edna Morton, Inez Clough and Evelyn Preer and their involvement in these films often propelled them into larger careers.

Levy purchased the rights to The Sport of the Gods and The Uncalled, works by acclaimed Black writer Paul Laurence Dunbar. In the early 1920s, race films were gaining prominence as a form of popular entertainment. The independent productions struggled to compete with the larger funding and distribution available to the big studios. By 1924 Levy faced the problem of finding distribution outlets for his films and closed his company.

In 2008, the U.S. Postal Service chose the promotional poster for The Sport of the Gods, Reol's first released film, to be featured on a postage stamp honouring Black film.

== Managing Lafayette Players in LA ==
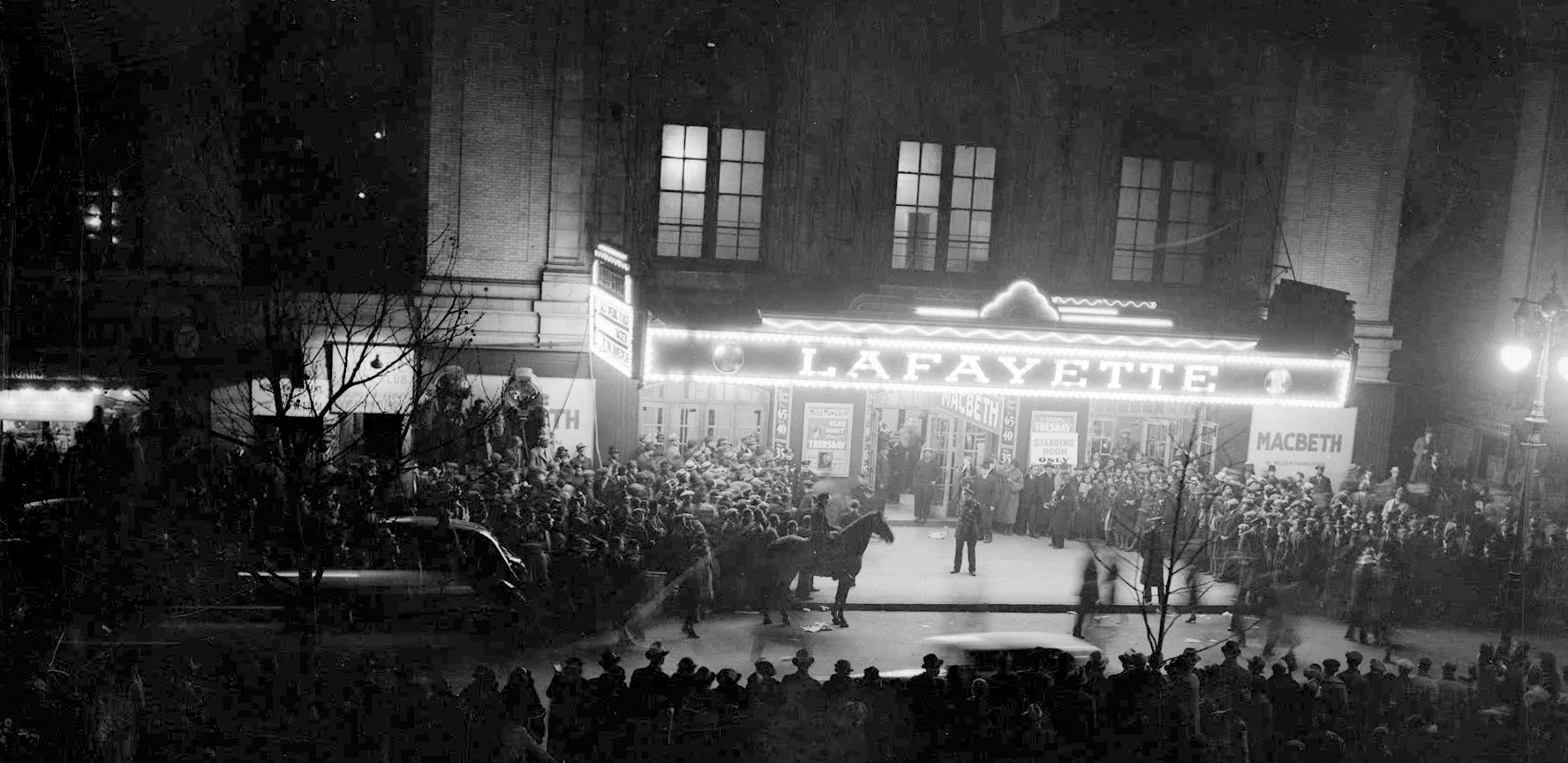
The Lafayette theatre (1936)

Levy attempted to revive the Lafayette Players on the West Coast after the demise of Reol Films. He brought the troupe from Harlem to Los Angeles, where they became a major attraction, performing weekly from June 1928 until the end of 1929 new shows first in the 1250 seats palace - the Lincoln Theatre and later in Orange Grove Theatre. After staging close to forty shows on the West Coast with Lafayette Players, which included Evelyn Preer, Abbie Mitchell, Sidney Kirkpatrick, Laura Bowman, and Andrew Bishop, Levy had to quit. 1929, the Great Depression hit, forcing theatres in LA and across the country to close.

== Later life ==
He returned to New York City in the early 1930s and accepted a job as a magazine editor working for famous publisher Martin Goodman. Levy, as editor, became a leading creator of detective magazines. His work in this area helped to establish the material for many film noir projects in the thirties and forties. He died in 1959, unrecognized by posterity for his pioneering role in Black theatre and film.

== Theatrical productions with African American casts at Lafayette Theatre ==
The following is a list of all of the (all Black) theatre productions that Levy was responsible for at the Lafayette Theatre between 1916 and 1919.

Production List	Playwright	Opening Night	Original Year	White Theater at the time of Lafayette of Production	Notes
In The Bishop's Carriage	Channing Pollack	17 July 1916	1907	Grand Opera House, NY	
The Third Degree	Charles Klein	24 July 1916	1909	Hudson Theatre. NY	
The Ghost Breaker	Paul Dickey Chas W. Goddard	31 July 1916	1913	Lyceum Theatre	
A Pair of Sixes	Edward Peple	8 October 1916	1914	Longacre Theatre	
Big Jim Garrity	Owen Davis	17 August 1916	1914	New York Theatre	
Sign of Four		17 August 1916	1903	West End Theatre	
Stop Thief	Carlyle Moore	28 August 1916	1913	Gaiety Theatre	
At Bay	George Scarborough	9 April 1916	1914	39th Street Theatre	
Within the Law	Bayard Veiller	9 November 1916	1913 1928	Eltinge 42nd Street Theatre Cosmopolitan Theatre.	
Madame X	Alexander Bisson	18 September 1916	1920 1927	New Amsterdam Theatre Earl Carroll Theatre	
The Family Cupboard	Owen Davis	2 October 1916	1915	Playhouse Theatre	
The Conspiracy	Robert Baker John Emerson	9 October 1916	1914	New Amsterdam Theatre	
The Lure	George Scarborough	16 October 1916	1913	Garrick Theatre	
The Man of the Hour	George Broadhurst	23 October 1916	1906	Savoy Theatre	
Forty-Five Minutes from Broadway	George Cohan	23 October 1916	1906	New Amsterdam Theatre New York Theatre George M. Cohan's Theatre	
The City	Clyde Fitch	13 November 1916	1910	Lyric Theatre Hackett Theatre Academy of Music Grand Opera Lyceum Theatre	
The Lion and the Mouse	Charles Klein	20 November 1916	1905	Hudson Theatre Princess Theatre	
Raffles	Eugene Prebre, E.W. Hornung	27 November 1916	1904 1910	Savoy Theatre Gaiety Theatre	
Three Twins	Charles Dickens	12 April 1916	1908	Herald Square Theatre Majestic Theatre	
Get Rich	Rich Wallingford George Cohan	12 November 1916	1910	Gaiety Theatre George M. Cohan's Theatre	
Trilby	Paul Potter adapted by DuMaurier	26 March 1917	1895 1905 1915 1921	Garden Theatre New Amsterdam Theatre Shubert Theatre National Theatre	
The Yankee Prince	George Cohan	4 February 1917	1908	Knickerbocker Theatre	
The Law of the Land	George Broadhurst	23 April 1917	1914	48th Street Theatre	
The Time, the Place, the Girl	Joseph E. Howard	30 April 1917	1907 1942	Wallack's Theatre Grand Opera Theatre Mansfield Theatre	
Sinners	Owen Davis	5 July 1917	1915	Playhouse Theatre	
The House of a Thousand Candles	George Middelton	21 May 1917	1908	Dalys Theatre	
The Great Divide	William Vaughn Moody	28 May 1917	1907 1908 1917	Princess Theatre Daly's Theatre Academy of Music Theatre Grand Opera Theatre Lyceum Theatre	
The Natural Law	Charles Sumner	6 April 1917	1915	Theatre Republic	
Damaged Goods	Eugene Brieux	18 June 1917	1913	Fulton Theatre	
The Yellow Ticket	Michael Morton	17 July 1917	1914	Eltinge 42nd Street Theatre	
The Chocolate Soldier (American Version)	Stanislaus Stange	23 July 1917		.	
The Traffic	Rachael Marshall Oliver Bailey	30 July 1917	1914	New York Theatre	
The Little Millionaire	George Cohan	8 June 1917	1912	George M. Cohan's Theatre	
The Gamblers	Charles Klein	13 August 1917	1910	Maxine Elliot's Theatre	
Charley's Aunt	Brandon Thomas	20 August 1917	1906	Manhattan Theatre	
The Vampire	Lee Morrison Edgar Allan Woolf George Sylvester Viereck	27 August 1917			
The Man from Mexico	H.A. Du Souchet	9 March 1917	1907	Hoyt's Theatre Garrick's Theatre	
The Silent Witness	Jack Deleon Jack Celestine	9 October 1917	1916	Fulton Theatre	
Are You A Mason?		17 September 1917	1901	Garrick Theatre Wallack's Theatre	
The Inner Man		3 November 1918	1917	Lyric Theatre Cort Theatre	
The Knife	Eugene Walters	18 March 1918	1917	Bijou Theatre	
Faust	Adaptation from Faust by Johann Wolfgang von Goethe	4 January 1918	1930	Casino Theatre Centre Theatre	
The Master Mind	David Carter	4 August 1918	1913	Harris Theatre	
The Man Who Owns Broadway	George Cohan	15 April 1918	1910	New York Theatre	
Sappho and Phaon	Percy MacKaye	22 April 1918	1907	Lyric Theatre	
His Honor the Mayor	Charles Campbell	29 April 1918	1906	New York Theatre	
Where do you Live?	Wallacks Alma George Hobart	13 May 1918	1911	Weber's Music Hall	
Broken Threads	Ernest Wilkes	20 May 1918	1917	Fulton Theatre	
Very Good Eddie	Guy Bolton	27 May 1918	1915	Princess Theatre Casino Theatre 39th Street Theatre	
The Blindness of Virtue	Cosmo Hamilton	24 June 1918	1912	39th Street Theatre	
A Butterfly on the Wheel?	Edward G. Hammerde F. Neilson K.C. Neilson	7 January 1918	1912	39th Street Theatre	
The Woman in the Case	Clyde Fitch	15 July 1918	1905	Herald Square Theatre	
His Last Dollar	David Higgins Baldwin Cooke	22 July 1918	1904	American Theatre	
The White Sister	Walter Hackett F. Marion Crawford	29 July 1918	1909	Daly's Theatre	
The Boss	Edward Shelton	8 May 1918	1911	Astor Theatre	
Cheating Cheater	Max Marcin	9 February 1918	1917	Eltinge 42nd Street Theatre	
Arizona	Augustus Thoman	9 September 1918	1901 1912	Herald Square Theatre Lyric Theatre	
The Rosary	Edward Rose	16 September 1918	1910	Garden Theatre	
The Ninety and Nine	Ramsey Morris	20 January 1919	1903	Academy of Music	
Man's Enemy	Eric Hudson Charles H. Langdon	2 October 1919	1900	Star Theatre 1913 Lyric Theatre	
The Two Orphans	Eugene Cormon Adolphe D'Ennery	17 February 1919	1904 1874 1926	New Amsterdam Theatre Union Square Theatre Cosmopolitan Theatre	
Convict 999	Walter Howard	3 March 1919	1907	Thelia Theatre	
The Story of the Rosary	Owen Davis	3 October 1919	1914	Manhattan Opera House	
The Guilty Man	Ruth Helen Davis Charles Klein	17 March 1919	1916	Astor Theatre	
The Bridge	Rupert Hughes	4 July 1919	1909	Majestic Theatre	
The Fortune Hunter	Winchell Smith	14 April 1919	1909	Gaiety Theatre	
A Midnight Marriage	James Halleck Reid	21 April 1919	1904	Grand Opera House	
The Burglar and the Lady	Langdon McCormick	5 May 1919	1906	American Theatre	
The Havoc	H.S. Sheldon	26 May 1919	1911	Bijou Theatre	
The Girl in the Taxi	Hugh Stainislus	6 February 1919	1910	Astor Theatre	
Mrs. Temple's Telegram	Frank Wyatt	16 June 1919	1906	Hoyt Theatre	
The Blue Envelope	Frank Hatch Robert Homans	23 June 1919	1916	Cort Theatre	

== Filmography ==
REOP made ten films between 1920 and 1924 including:

- Eyes of Youth (1920)
- The Burden of Race (1921)
- The Spirit of the Gods (1921)
