= Joseph Lee (inventor) =

American baker and inventor (1848–1908)

Joseph Lee (July 4, 1848 – June 11, 1908) was an American baker and inventor. He successfully managed a hotel in Needham, Massachusetts for about a decade and later managed restaurants near Boston, ran a resort in Squantum, and ran a successful catering company. Lee was also an innovator, creating machines that successfully automated the process of kneading bread and making breadcrumbs. In recognition of these successes, he was inducted into the National Inventors Hall of Fame in 2019.

== Biography ==
Joseph Lee was born in Charleston, South Carolina on July 4, 1848 to Susan and Henry Lee, who were both enslaved, and grew up in South Carolina, also enslaved. He began baking as a child, working in a bakery in Beaufort, South Carolina. He was a blacksmith for a time during the American Civil War. Lee further developed his cooking skills and knowledge as a steward in the United States Coast Survey, where he worked for eleven years. Lee married Christina Howard on May 12, 1875; they had four children.

Lee left the Coastal Survey and settled in Needham, Massachusetts, where he opened a restaurant and gradually developed the Woodland Park Hotel, which he leased in 1882 and purchased the following year. Lee was interested in automating the process of making bread to ensure a uniform quality with less time and effort than it took to knead by hand; he invented a machine that did that and received a patent on August 7, 1894. This kneader was more efficient and faster than kneading by hand. The next year, on June 4, 1895, Lee received a patent for a machine to make breadcrumbs. This invention was prompted after Lee's machine started making too much bread. The Royal Worcester Bread Crumb Company used Lee's invention to make bread crumbs for restaurants.

By 1886 he was a wealthy inhabitant of Newton. The hotel was well-regarded and those who stayed in it included prominent members of society including presidents Benjamin Harrison, Chester A. Arthur, and Grover Cleveland, as well as the judge Walbridge A. Field, and Lady Henry Somerset. Lee became a well-regarded member of Massachusetts society, serving on several hotel associations and attending social events in Boston. Lee also advocated for civil rights, attending the 1890 Convention of Colored Men.

Lee's breadcrumber was widely adopted; the National Inventors Hall of Fame writes that within five years of its invention it "was used by many of America’s leading hotels and was a fixture in hundreds of the country’s leading catering establishments". Although he lost ownership of the Woodland Park Hotel in 1896 in the aftermath of the Panic of 1893, Lee soon began to manage the Pavilion Restaurant near Norumbega Park. The following year the Lee family moved to Boston. By then he also was running a successful catering company and from at least April to November he ran the Trinity Court Cafe in Boston. Lee also ran a resort in Squantum which was visited by numerous Massachusetts politicians. The family moved again in 1900 to the South End of Boston. Archibald and Angelina Weld Grimké boarded at his home for a time. Lee continued to work on his inventions, patenting a second version of the bread kneader in 1902. That year in Boston, he was in charge of the Lee Catering Company.

The National Bread Company eventually held the bread kneader's rights, and The Goodell Company those to the breadcrumber. Lee fell ill with pulmonary tuberculosis and died on June 11, 1908, in his home.

== Legacy ==
In 2019 Lee was inducted into the American National Inventors Hall of Fame.
