= Inez Clough =

American singer, dancer, actress (1873–1933)

- Inez Clough, 1920
- Born: March 1, 1873; Worcester, Massachusetts, U.S.
- Died: November 21, 1933 (aged 60); Elgin, Illinois, U.S.
- Other names: Inez Clough–Hogan; Inez Clough Hogan
- Occupations: Singer; dancer; actress
- Spouse: Henry Peter "Pete" Hogan (m. 1922)
- Relatives: Estelle Pinckney Clough (sister-in-law)

Inez Clough (March 1, 1873 – November 21, 1933), also known as Inez Clough–Hogan, was an American singer, dancer, and actress who appeared on stage and in films.

== Early life ==
Clough, an African American, was born on March 1, 1873, in Worcester, Massachusetts. Clough spent much of her early life in Massachusetts, attending school in Worcester and studying piano and voice in Boston.

Her sister, Jennie Cora Clough, an influential educator in the city of Worcester.

== Career ==
In 1896, Clough joined Oriental America, a Broadway theatre show created by the Vaudeville impresario John William Isham.

In 1897, Clough moved to London for the show's European tour. Describing her troupe's experience abroad, Thomas Riis wrote that her acting troupe observed "comparatively lavish facilities and larger pit, orchestras than were customary in America. The hospitality shown towards them undoubtedly impressed Afro-American travelers" who because of racism and racist laws frequently experienced discrimination or inferior accommodations in the United States. African Americans experienced greatly different treatment in Europe than they did in the United States.

After touring with Oriental America, Clough remained in London for about ten years. In those ten years she gave voice lessons, did solo shows, and was a member of The Drury Lane Pantomimes.

In the early 1900s, Clough returned to the United States and continued her acting career, primarily performing in all-black musical comedy shows. She performed in The Shoo-Fly Regiment (1907) by Bob Cole and J. Rosamond Johnson, and toured with the Bert Williams and George Walker in the Willkams and Walker company.

In 1917, she acted onstage in Three Plays For a Negro Theatre written by Ridgely Torrence. It was staged at the Garden Theatre in New York City. Writer Benjamin Griffith Brawley wrote that the play was a drama that aimed to "get away from the minstrelsy and burlesque" that predominated the early African American theater scene "and honestly present Negro characters face to face with all the problems that test the race in the crucible of American civilization". Writer James Weldon Johnson said the play "demanded the serious attention of the critics and the general public." Clough's participation in the production was widely publicized.

=== Films ===
Clough acted in silent films in the early 1920s. These films include Easy Money (1922), Ties of Blood (1921), and The Secret Sorrow (1921). Her last film was The Crimson Frog (1932).

== Personal life and death ==
Clough married in July 1922 railroad employee Henry Peter "Pete" Hogan in New York City, where she resided for the majority of the rest of her life.

By the end of her life, she had significant mental issues, accompanied by other health afflictions, including cancer. She died of peritonitis on November 21, 1933, in Elgin, Illinois.

== Stage performances ==
- 1896, Oriental America
- 1907, The Shoo-Fly Regiment
- 1920, After Hours
- 1922, Shuffle Along
- 1924, The Chocolate Dandies, at New Colonial Theatre, New York City
- 1927, Golden Dawn, at Hammerstein's Theatre
- 1927, Earth, written by Emjo Basshe, at 52nd Street Theatre, New York City
- 1928, Wanted, at Wallack's Theatre
- 1929, Harlem, at Apollo Theatre
- 1931, Savage Rhythm, at John Golden Theatre

== Filmography ==
- The Simp (1921 film)
- The Secret Sorrow (1921)
- Ties of Blood (1921)
- The Gunsaulus Mystery (1921)
- Easy Money (1922)
- The Crimson Frog (1932)
