= Mercedes Gilbert =

American actress (1894–1952)

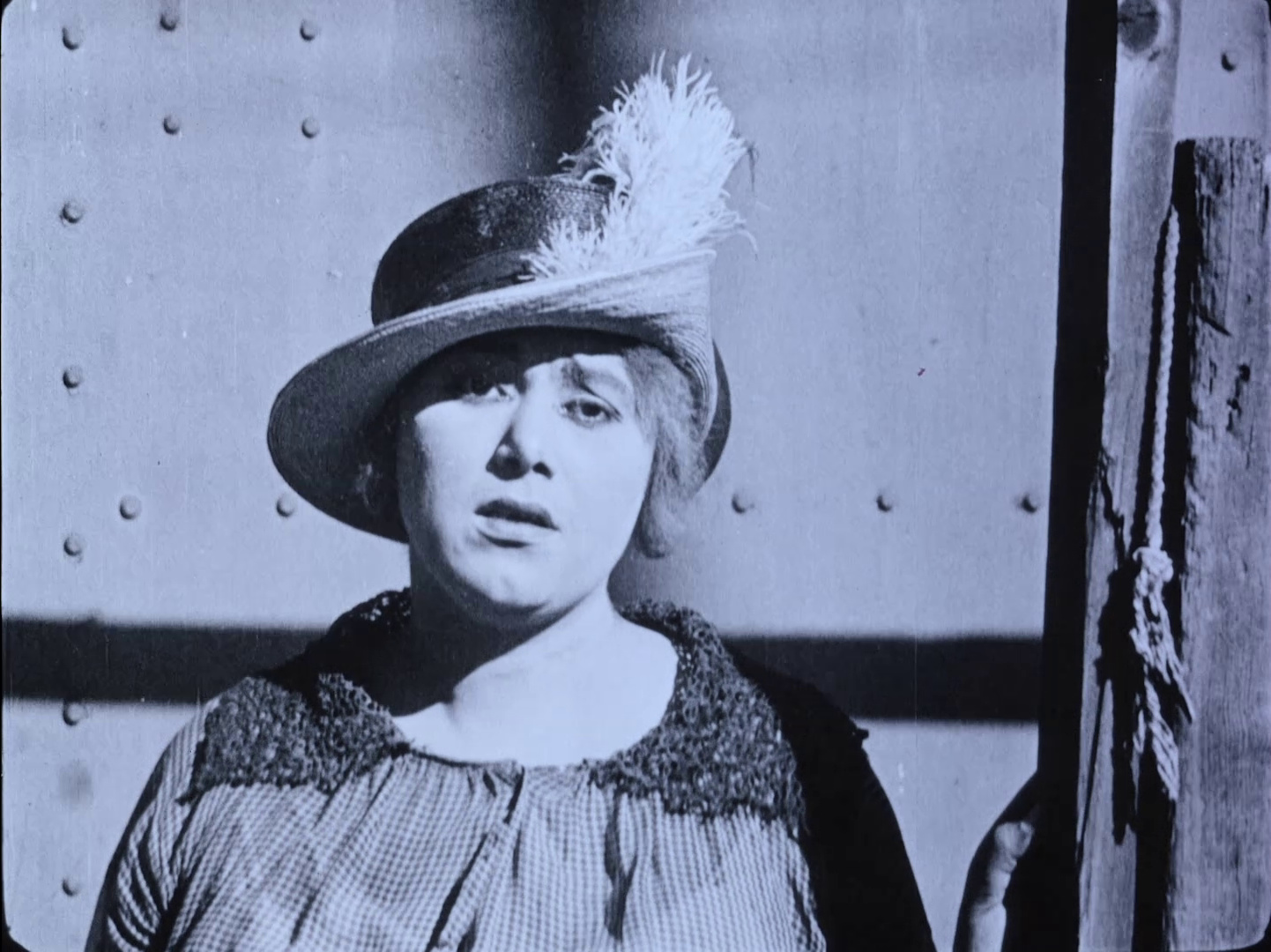
- Mercedes Gilbert in Body and Soul (1925)
- Born: July 26, 1894; Jacksonville, Florida, US
- Died: March 2, 1952 (aged 57); New York City, US
- Education: Edward Waters College
- Years active: 1921–1950

Mercedes Gilbert (July 26, 1894 – March 2, 1952) was an actress, novelist, and poet. She was African-American. She performed on stage, in three films, in a television series, and a radio show. She wrote a novel.

== Early life and education ==
Gilbert was a native of Jacksonville, Florida. She attended Edward Waters College, where she originally trained to be a nurse before coming to New York and entering the entertainment profession, first as a songwriter and then as a stage actress. Miss Gilbert was a member of Sigma Gamma Rho sorority.

== Career ==
Gilbert portrayed Zipporah, the wife of Moses, in the original touring production of The Green Pastures in 1930. She was still performing in 1950, appearing on Broadway in a new version of the play "Tobacco Road," with an all-black cast. In the mid-1940s, she performed a one-woman show at historically black colleges across the United States.

Gilbert appeared on screen four times: The Call of His People in 1921, Body and Soul in 1925, Moon Over Harlem in 1939 as Jackie's mother, and finally in the episode "The Green Dress" of the TV series Lights Out. She also appeared on radio, most notably in a 1943 tribute to black women in America called "Heroines in Bronze," where she played the role of Sojourner Truth. She performed occasionally on other radio programs, as well as writing and producing several radio skits.

Gilbert authored the 1938 novel Aunt Sara's Wooden God.

== Death ==
Gilbert died at age 57 in 1952 in Queens General Hospital in New York after a three-week illness.

== Filmography ==
- The Call of His People (1922)
- Body and Soul (1925)
- Moon Over Harlem (1939) as Jackie's mother
- Lights Out, TV series episode "The Green Dress"
