= Edna Morton =

American actress (1894–1980)

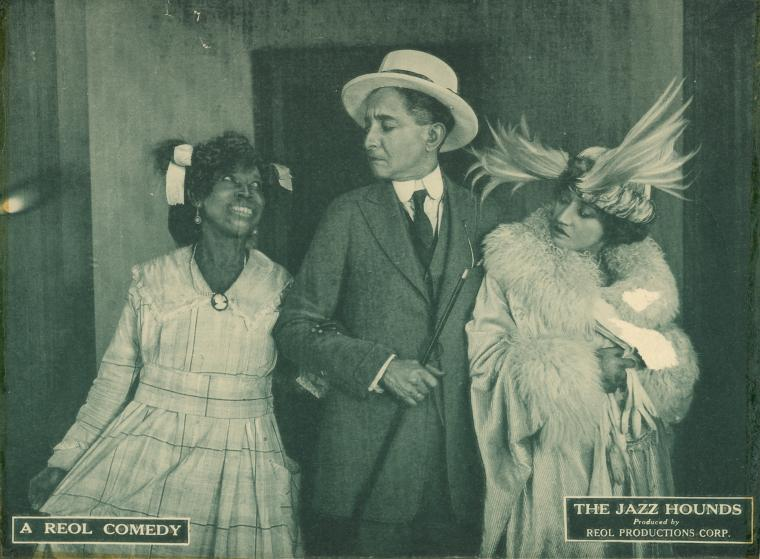
Edna Morton (right) with Lawrence Chenault in The Jazz Hounds

Edna Morton (April 2, 1894 – July 31, 1980) was an American actress who was in films in the 1920s. She starred in mainly race films most of them produced by Reol Productions. Her most notable films being Spitfire (1922), Easy Money (1922), and The Call of His People (1921). She was also in a film by Oscar Micheaux called A Son of Satan (1924). She is known to have been in ten films in total. She was referred to as "the colored Mary Pickford".

== Early life ==
Morton was born in Washington, D.C., on April 2, 1894.

== Acting career ==
Her earliest film was The Sport of the Gods (1921). She acted in many other films in 1921 but the production of The Sport of the Gods is believed to have taken place during February and March. It was Reol Productions' first film and she played the character known as Hattie Thompson. She went on to have bigger roles. In the film Spitfire (1922) she was the lead actress, playing the character Ruth 'Spitfire' Hill. Her co-star in this film was Lawrence Chenault, another African American actor. They were both in The Sport of Gods as well and made many films together between 1921 and 1925. These films included: The Burden of Race (1921), The Call of His People (1921), Secret Sorrow (1921), Ghost of Tolston's Manor (1923), and A Son of Satan (1924). One non-race film Edna Morton acted in was T. Hayes Hunter's Wildfire (1925). She had a part in the film as the side character known as Susie. When seen in cast listings, Edna Morton was listed as a player, leading to majority of her story being lost.

== Family ==
Morton married twice. Her first marriage was to Samuel A. Wilson. They were married in September 1915. They divorced on an unknown date. Morton’s second marriage was to Edward R. DeGrant on September 7, 1930. He died June 6, 1973. Morton did not marry again after and died seven years later at the age of 86 on July 31, 1980.

== Filmography ==
- The Sport of the Gods (1921)
- The Secret Sorrow (1921)
- The Simp (1921)
- The Call of His People (1921)
- The Burden of Race (1921)
- The Jazz Hounds (1922)
- Easy Money (1922)
- Spitfire (1922)
- A Son of Satan (1924)
- Three Miles Out (1924)
- Wildfire (1925)
