= REOL Productions =

Film production company in New York City from 1921 to 1924

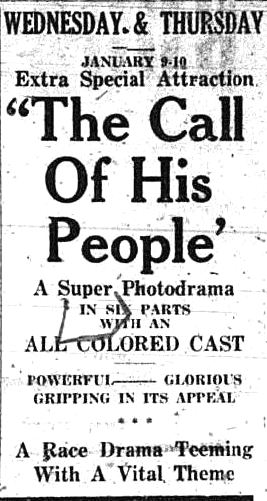
Advertisement for The Call of His People

REOL Productions Corporation was a film production company in New York City from 1921 until 1924 during the silent film era. It released ten race films, with all-African American casts for African American audiences.

== History ==
The company promoted its films by noting they were adaptations of works by African American authors such as a film version of Paul Laurence Dunbar's 1902 novel The Sport of the Gods. Lafayette Theatre manager Robert Levy managed the film productions with casts from the Lafayette Players.

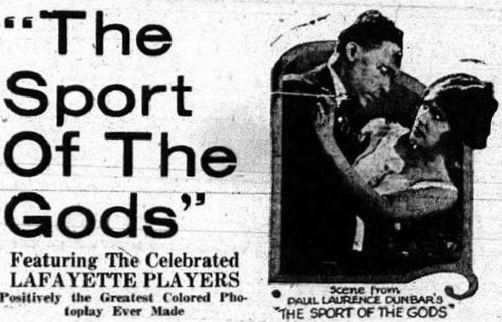
Advertisement for The Sport of the Gods

The studio's first release was The Sport of the Gods.

The company's The Call of His People was an adaptation of Aubrey Bowser's book about passing The Man Who Would Be White. Plans developed to adapt Charles W. Chesnutt's The Marrow of Tradition but did not come to fruition. The film company went out of business in 1924.

Productions included melodramas, at least one comedy, and two documentaries. It secured a distribution agreement in Philadelphia and Baltimore.

In 2002, the Cornell Institute for Digital Collections sought out any holders of the company's films for a restoration and preservation project.

== Filmography ==
- The Sport of the God (1921)
- The Burden of Race (1921)
- The Simp (1921)
- Ties of Blood (1921)
- The Secret Sorrow, starring George Edward Brown
- The Call of His People (1922), an adaptation of Aubrey Bowser's The Man Who Would Be White
- The Jazz Hounds (1922)
- The Schemers (1922)
- Easy Money (1922), starring Sherman H. Dudley
- Spitfire (1922)

== See also ==
- African American cinema
