= The Sport of the Gods =

Novel by Paul Laurence Dunbar

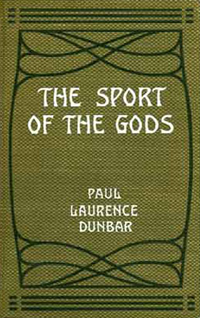
- First edition book cover, 1902
- Author: Paul Laurence Dunbar
- Language: English
- Genre: Novel
- Publisher: Dodd, Mead and Company
- Publication date: 1902
- Publication place: United States
- Media type: Print (hardback, paperback) and Audiobook
- Pages: 255 pp (First edition), 176 pp (February 1, 2011 edition)
- OCLC: 29687568
- Text: The Sport of the Gods at Wikisource

The Sport of the Gods is a novel by Paul Laurence Dunbar, first published in 1902, centered on American urban black life. Forced to leave the South, a family falls apart amid the harsh realities of Northern inner city life in this examination of the forces that extinguish the dreams of African Americans.

== Plot ==
Berry Hamilton, an emancipated black man, works as a butler for a wealthy white man Maurice Oakley. Berry lives in a small cottage a short distance away from the Oakley's place of residence. Berry lives with his wife, Fannie, and two children, Jack and Kitty. During a farewell dinner for Maurice's younger brother, Francis Oakley, it becomes known that a large sum of money has disappeared from Oakley residence due to Francis apparently being careless and leaving the key in the safe. Maurice soon convinces himself that Berry must have stolen the money. A court finds Berry guilty of the theft and sentences him to ten years of hard labor.

Maurice and his wife expel Fannie, Jack, and Kitty from the cottage. Unable to find work, Fannie and her children decide to move to New York. Once in New York, Jack begins work and starts regularly visiting the Banner Club. He begins dating an entertainer from the club named Hattie Sterling. To Fannie's disapproval, Hattie helps Kitty to find employment as a singer and actress. Jack's situation quickly declines and he becomes an alcoholic. Hattie breaks the relationship. Completely degraded, Joe strangles Hattie. Later, he confesses to the murder and finds himself in prison. With her husband and son in prison, Fannie is distraught. Kitty convinces Fannie to marry a man named Mr. Gibson.

Francis Oakley, who left for Paris to become an artist, sends a message to Maurice Oakley. When Maurice receives the letter, he postulates that it could be a message informing him of the artistic successes of Francis. To his dismay, it describes how Francis stole the money and he wishes for Berry Hamilton to be released from prison. Maurice decides that he will not announce Berry's innocence in hopes of preserving the honor of his brother and himself.

Mr. Skaggs, an acquaintance of Joe at the Banner Club, overhears the story of Berry Hamilton's conviction for theft. As a writer for New York's Universe, Mr. Skaggs postulates that if he can prove Berry's innocence, he will have a popular article for the publisher. He travels to the hometown of the Hamilton's to converse with Maurice Oakley. He first meets with a man named Colonel Saunders who tells him that he believes Berry is innocent, the money was simply lost, and to protect the secret, Maurice Oakley carries the money in his "secret" pocket at all times. To gain entry into the Oakley residence, Skaggs lies about having a letter from Francis. Mr. Skaggs forcibly removes Francis's letter from Maurice's secret pocket.

With Francis's letter, Mr. Skaggs is able to have Berry pardoned after five years in prison. Mr. Skaggs brings Berry to New York. Soon, Berry finds out about his son, daughter, and wife's new husband. Hopeless, Berry plans to murder his wife's suitor. To Berry's fortune, he finds that Mr. Gibson has been killed in a fight at a racetrack. Broken down by the hardships of the city, Fannie and Berry decide to move back to the cottage near the Oakley residence when the apologetic Mrs. Oakley begs them to return.

== Themes ==
Literary naturalism is prevalent in Dunbar's authorship of The Sport of the Gods. Scholar Thomas L. Morgan proposes that he "reconfigured the space" of the typical American city to surpass simple tropes of moral decay. Consequently, the city instead functions as a deterministic force that inflicts on the Hamilton family; a "sport." Through a perspective lens, this suggest that the character's fates are governed not by one's autonomy itself, but rather the socio-economic evidence and systemic racism that makes the "American Dream" unobtainable for migrant Black families.

In the story, Berry Hamilton's false imprisonment acts as an astute indictment of the American legal system during the Jim Crow era. The overlying theme of racial profiling and the shortcoming of "justice" allows the melodrama to simultaneously act as a social critique and captivating narrative. Critics like Jabari Asim, who wrote for The Washington Post, have effectively linked Dunbar's work to W.E.B Du Bois' "double consciousness" concept, through the novel's production of a "voice through the voiceless." This connection serves to highlight the existence of individuals trapped by poverty and racial prejudice.

== Symbolism and setting ==
The symbolic evolution of the Hamilton cottage is pivotal to the centering of Dunbar’s narrative in The Sport of the Gods. Thomas L. Morgan’s scholarly perspective poses the idea that the cottage (which was a slave cabin on the Oakley estate originally), is initially presented as a “bower of peace and comfort,” which represents the illusion of Black progress in the South. However, once Berry Hamilton was accused of theft, the cottage was quickly revoked of its “Edenic” quality, showing that the family’s security was always contingent on white hospitality.

While the South holds a stagnant form of oppression rooted in the past, the North is portrayed as a “deterministic” machine. This symbolic shift in New York therefore regrounds from domestic to industrial. In the story, the Hamiltons encounter the “Banner Club,” which was a setting that presented the seductive but destructive nature that urban life had to offer. Unlike the previously known Southern atmosphere where overt racism and legal injustice were evident, the Northern setting offered more of a “slow moral decay.” Critics like Morgan argue that Dunbar uses these settings as a literate tool to illustrate that for Black Americans in the early 20th century, neither the North or South offered a true escape from systemic racism.

== Character analysis ==
A tragic embodiment of the failures of the "politics of respectability," Berry Hamilton is a trusted and industrious butler who works for the Oakley family. In the beginning of Dunbar's novel, Berry is conveyed as the epitome of the "Good Negro;" a term used by scholars to describe the type of Black individual who limits themselves strictly to white expectations. Berry believes that his loyalty and obedience to white social standards will protect him, not knowing that it has the inverse effect. His identity hinged on his service to the Oakley family; he prided himself on his sobriety and "honesty of purpose." His wrongful conviction then acts as an instrumental moment in the story, critiquing this belief that he is protected. Despite 30 years of service, he is easily discarded when Francis Oakley's word is threatened.

Joe and Kitty are representative of the "new generation" of the Great Migration, yet are highly susceptible to the city's influence and vulnerability of a new life. Joe's character trajectory from an admirable barber to a convicted murderer shows the "naturalistic" downfall that is central to the novel. His indulgence in New York's "sporting life" and the overarching inevitability of his alcoholism are not only personal shortcomings, but the result of a young individual stripped of his family structure and social identity.

Kitty's transition into a "showgirl" reflects the very limited routes for Black female lifestyles in the North. Her character development highlights the lines blurred between artistic expression and Black bodies being turned into commodities for white entertainment.

== Historical background and context ==
The Sport of the Gods is a pioneering work of African American literature that represents the Great Migration from the rural south to the urban north. Scholars such as Thomas L. Morgan remark that Dunbar used an "alternative narrative strategy" as a tool to test against the preceding later urban narratives, where stereotypes limited Black identity.

Additionally, Dunbar's novel reflects his own personal professional tensions. Critic Renee Graham notes that he faced significant pressure from the public that preferred his "dialect poetry" rather than his naturalistic prose. The Sport of the Gods serves as an astute retreat from his more common sentimental verses, permitting Dunbar to engage with more complex social issues, such as the injustice of the legal system that led to the disintegration of the Hamilton family unit that succumbed to external societal pressures.

== Reception ==
Literary critic Rebecca Ruth Gold describes The Sport of the Gods as an object lesson in the power of shame – a key component of the scapegoat mentality – to limit the law’s capacity to deliver justice.

Despite being primarily known as a poet, Dunbar's creation of The Sport of the Gods has gained a retrospective spike in critical appreciation. Modern critics like Renee Graham argue that the story pioneered the perception of Northern migration with "stark and unromanticized" realism. This focal point being on urban Black experience also set the stage for future Harlem Renaissance authors. The novel's upholding relevance is often cited through its connection in later productions, such as the "caged bird" metaphor in the later popularization of Dunbar's writing. It is seen as the landmark for the Hamilton family's internal conflicts as they navigate the limiting social hierarchies of the South and North.

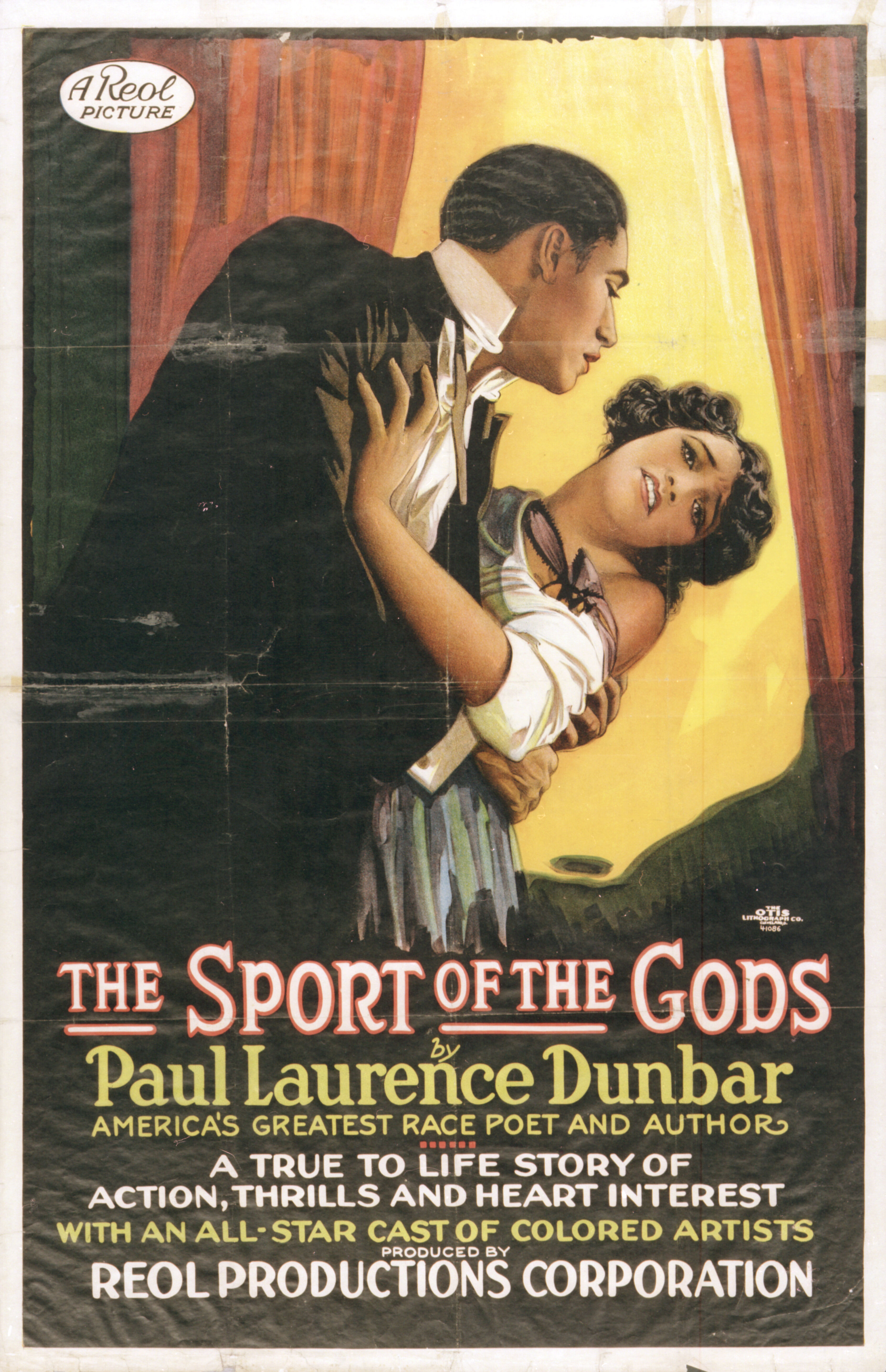
Theater poster for The Sport of the Gods (1921)

== Film adaptation ==
Robert Levy, a prolific producer of race films in the 1920s, earned the rights to adapt The Sport of the Gods; his film version of the novel debuted in Chicago in 1921. While the most prominent roles went to black actors, Levy also selected whites for small parts, marking a breakthrough in desegregation in the entertainment industry. Billboard magazine carried a notice for the opening on its main motion picture page, making it the first time this level of recognition had ever been paid to a race film. Edward R. Abrams played the role of Jim Skaggs, and Elizabeth Boyer played Kitty Hammilton.

In 2008, the United States Postal Service chose to feature the promotional poster for The Sport of Gods movie, showing Abrams and Boyer, on a commemorative stamp as part of its "Vintage Black Cinema" release. Although no copies of the film are known to survive, some theater bills, production stills, and film reviews do exist.
