= Lawrence Chenault =

American actor

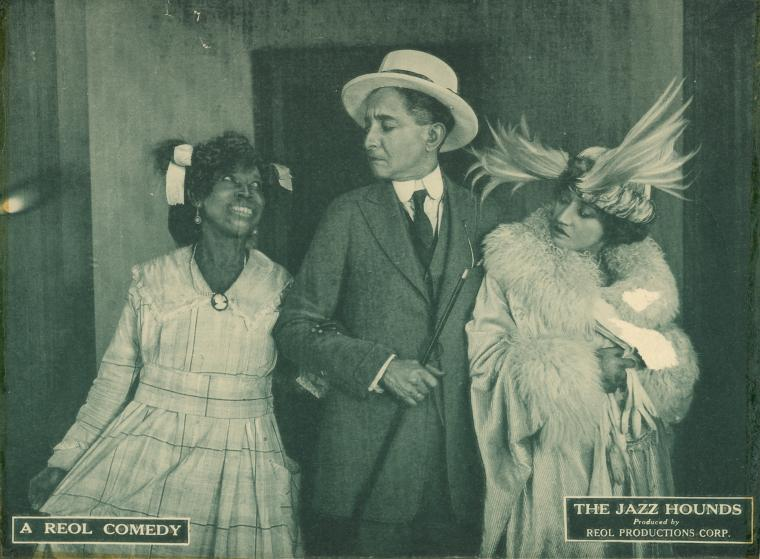
- Chenault (center), publicity still from The Jazz Hounds c. 1921 – c. 1924
- Born: November 23, 1877; Mount Sterling, Kentucky, U.S.
- Died: December 27, 1943 (aged 66); Indianapolis, Indiana
- Occupations: Silent film actor, vaudeville performer

Lawrence Chenault (November 23, 1877 – December 27, 1943) was an American vaudeville performer and silent film actor. He appeared in approximately 24 films between years 1920 and 1934; most of his performances were in films directed by pioneering African-American filmmaker Oscar Micheaux. His brother, Jack Chenault (September 26, 1888 – May 22, 1925), was also a film actor.

== Early life ==
Lawrence Chenault was born on November 23, 1877, in Mt. Sterling, Kentucky, to Mollie Mitchell and William O. Chenault. They later moved to Cincinnati, Ohio, where Chenault became a soloist for the Allen Temple Church. In 1888, Chenault's mother Mollie Mitchell married Ambrose Saunders. Because of this, Chenault became Saunders' stepson and was listed in the 1900 US Census as Lawrence Saunders.

== Acting career ==
Chenault joined acting troupes, the first being Al G. Field's Negro Minstrels in 1895. One of the more famous groups he took part in were the Lafayette Players, becoming one of their leading men.

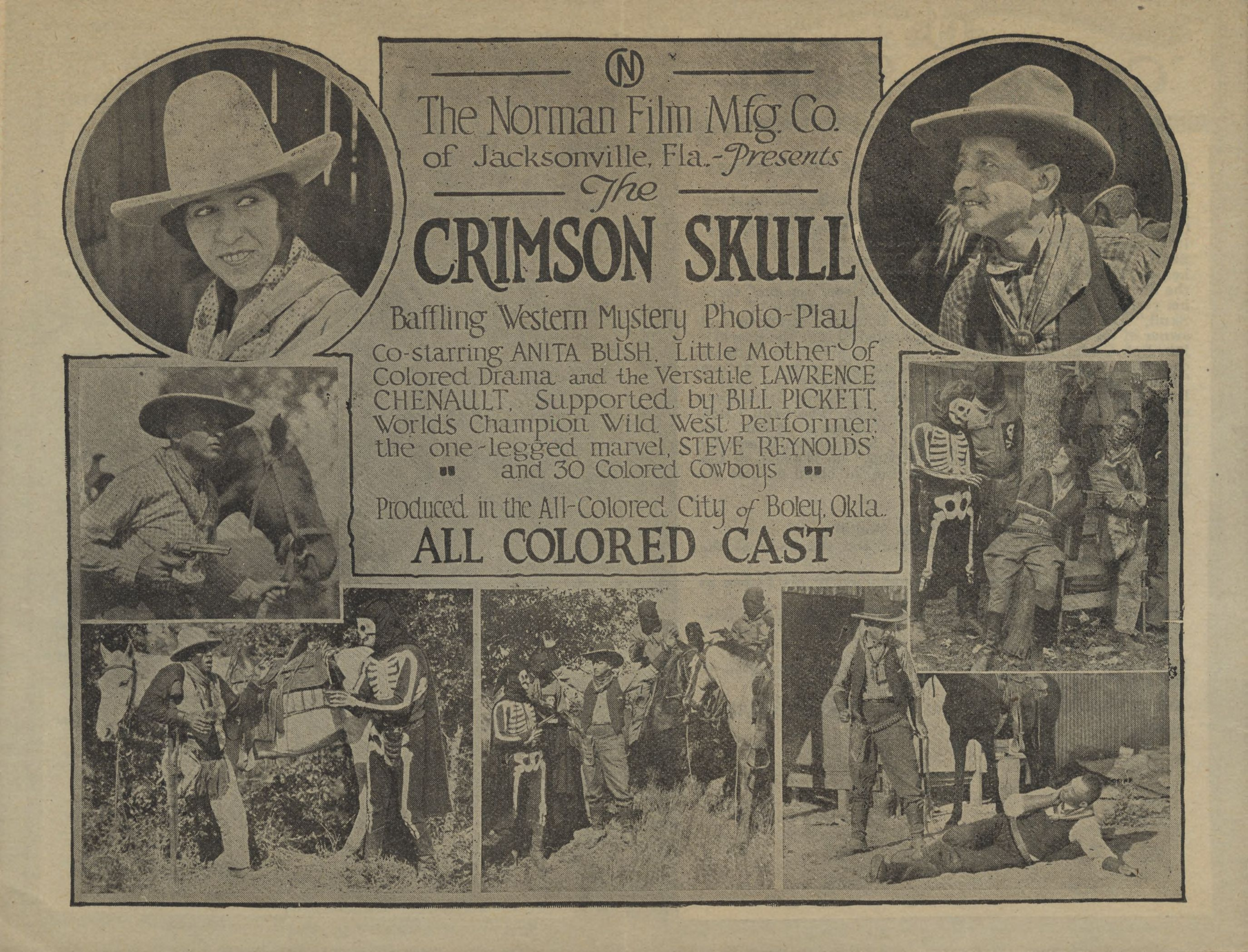

Chenault acted in several films from 1920 to 1934. His debut was in Oscar Micheaux's The Brute in 1920, with other standouts from his career being the all-Black western The Crimson Skull and Body and Soul.

Chenault was heavily associated with the race film movement, both from his recurring roles in Micheaux's films as well as the close association between the Lafayette Players and Reol Productions, another well-known studio for creating films aimed for African-American audiences. His role in Micheaux's Body and Soul reflects the director's choice of casting Black actors as both heroes and villains in his films. Chenault's acting style on camera was noted to be much more impacted by his time with the Lafayette Players than his earlier career in minstrel shows.

Chenault's role in Ten Nights in a Ball Room (1926) was noted to be ironic, as the film is a temperance film and Chenault was allegedly well known for his drinking habits.

== Collapse ==
On the week of August 8, 1928, Chenault made his debut appearance on the stage of the Harlem Alhambra, alongside Billy Andrews and George Randall. He collapsed on August 17 shortly after completing a performance. The source of his trouble is related to the passing of a friend of his, Johnnie Woods, who he had shared a room with for many years.

== Filmography ==
- The Brute (1920)
- The Symbol of the Unconquered (1920)
- The Secret Sorrow (1921)
- The Gunsaulus Mystery (1921)
- The Crimson Skull (1922)
- A Son of Satan (1924)
- Body and Soul (1925)
- The Devil's Disciple (1926)
- The Conjure Woman (1926)
- The Scar of Shame (1927)
- Ten Nights in a Barroom (1926)
- The House Behind the Cedars (1927)
- Veiled Aristocrats (1932) sound remake of The House Behind the Cedars
- Ten Minutes to Live (1932)
