= Norman Lear =

American screenwriter and producer (1922–2023)

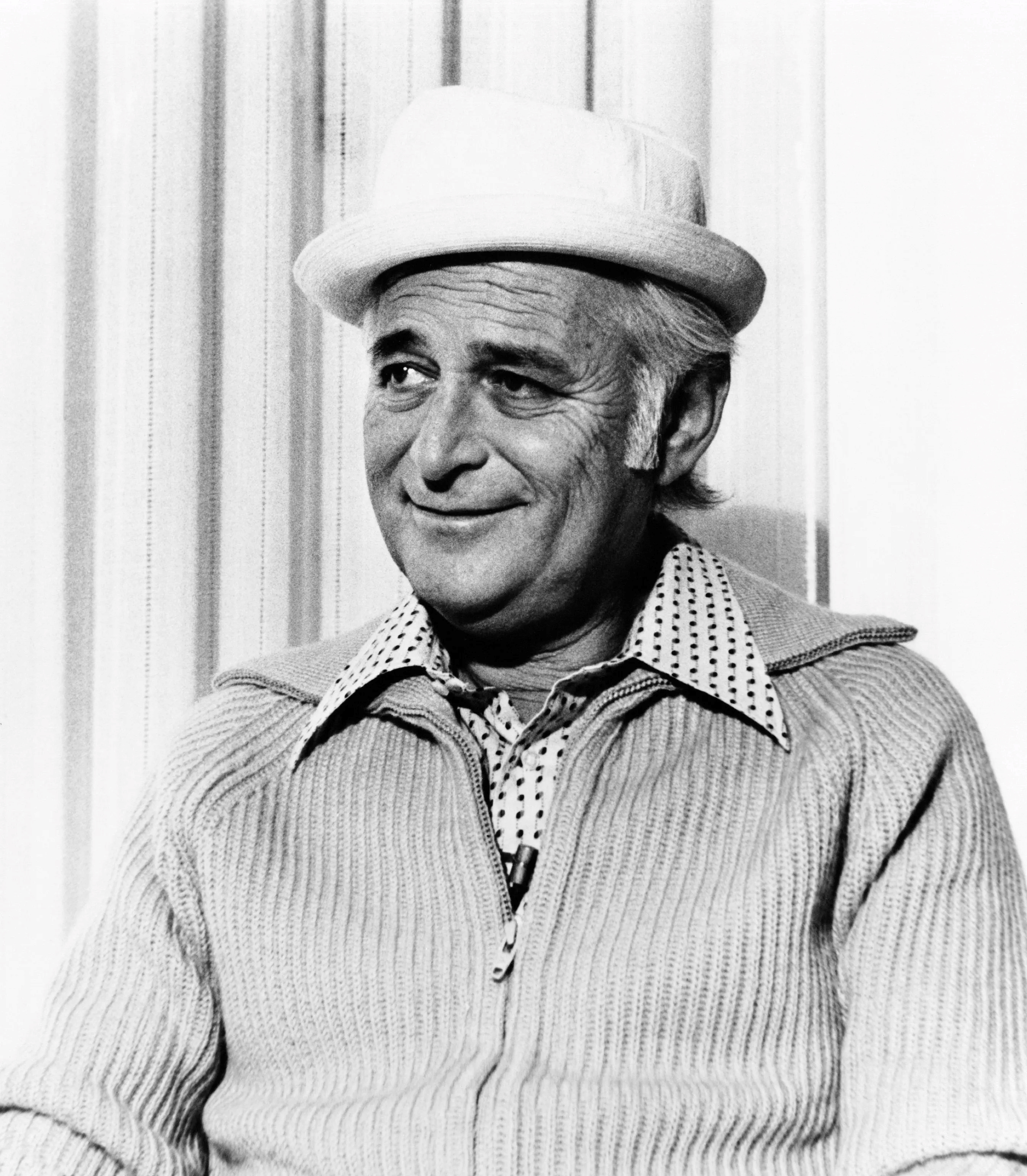
- Lear in 1977
- Born: Norman Milton Lear; July 27, 1922; New Haven, Connecticut, U.S.
- Died: December 5, 2023 (aged 101); Los Angeles, California, U.S.
- Education: Emerson College
- Occupations: Screenwriter; producer
- Years active: 1946–2023
- Known for: Sitcoms: All in the Family; The Jeffersons; Sanford and Son; Good Times; Maude; One Day at a Time; Mary Hartman, Mary Hartman
- Spouses: Charlotte Rosen (m. 1943; div. 1956); Frances Loeb (m. 1956; div. 1985); Lyn Davis (m. 1987)
- Children: 6
- Website: normanlear.com

Norman Milton Lear (July 27, 1922 – December 5, 2023) was an American screenwriter and producer who wrote and produced more than 100 television shows during a career that lasted over 70 years. Lear created and produced numerous popular 1970s sitcoms, including All in the Family (1971–1979), Maude (1972–1978), Sanford and Son (1972–1977), One Day at a Time (1975–1984), The Jeffersons (1975–1985), and Good Times (1974–1979). His works introduced political and social themes to the sitcom format.

Lear received many awards, including six Primetime Emmy Awards, two Peabody Awards, the National Medal of Arts in 1999, the Kennedy Center Honors in 2017, and the Golden Globe Carol Burnett Award in 2021. He was a member of the Television Academy Hall of Fame.

Lear was known for his political activism and funding of liberal and progressive causes and politicians. In 1980, he founded the advocacy organization People for the American Way to counter the influence of the Christian right in politics. In the early 2000s, he mounted a national tour to display a copy of the Declaration of Independence that had been printed in 1776.

== Early life and education ==
Norman Milton Lear was born on July 27, 1922, in New Haven, Connecticut, to Jeanette (née Seicol) and Hyman "Herman" Lear, a traveling salesman. Both parents were of Russian-Jewish descent. He had a younger sister, Claire Lear Brown (1925–2015). Lear grew up in a Jewish household in Connecticut and had a bar mitzvah ceremony.

When Lear was nine years old and was living with his family in Chelsea, Massachusetts, his father went to prison for selling fake bonds. Lear thought of his father as a "rascal"; he said that the character of Archie Bunker in All in the Family (whom Lear depicted as white Protestant) was in part inspired by his father, while the character of Edith Bunker was in part inspired by his mother. Lear later said that the moment which inspired his lifetime of advocacy occurred at age nine when he first heard antisemitic Catholic radio priest Father Charles Coughlin. After hearing more of Coughlin's radio sermons, Lear said he found Coughlin would promote antisemitism by targeting people whom Jews considered to be "great heroes", such as US President Franklin Roosevelt.

Lear attended Samuel J. Tilden High School in Brooklyn, New York, graduated from Weaver High School in Hartford, Connecticut, in 1940 and attended Emerson College in Boston, but dropped out in 1942 to enlist in the US Army Air Forces.

== Military career ==
Lear enlisted in the United States Army Air Forces in September 1942. He served in the Mediterranean theater as a radio operator and gunner on Boeing B-17 Flying Fortress bombers with the 772nd Bomb Squadron, 463rd Bomb Group of the Fifteenth Air Force; in a 2014 interview, he talked about bombing Germany. He flew 52 combat missions and received the Air Medal with four oak leaf clusters. Lear was discharged from the Army Air Forces in 1945. His World War II crew members are featured in the book Crew Umbriago by Daniel P. Carroll.

== Career ==
=== 1950–1959 ===
After World War II, Lear had a career in public relations. The career choice was inspired by his Uncle Jack: "My dad had a brother, Jack, who flipped me a quarter every time he saw me. He was a press agent so I wanted to be a press agent. That's the only role model I had. So all I wanted was to grow up to be a guy who could flip a quarter to a nephew." Lear decided to move to California to restart his career in publicity, driving with his toddler daughter across the country.

His first night in Los Angeles, Lear stumbled upon a production of George Bernard Shaw's Major Barbara at the 90-seat theater-in-the-round Circle Theater off Sunset Boulevard. One of the actors in the play was Sydney Chaplin, the son of actors Charlie Chaplin and Lita Grey. Charlie Chaplin, Alan Mowbray, and Dame Gladys Cooper sat in front of Lear, and after the show was over, Charlie Chaplin performed.

Lear had a first cousin in Los Angeles, Elaine, who was married to an aspiring comedy writer named Ed Simmons. Simmons and Lear teamed up to sell home furnishings door-to-door for a company called The Gans Brothers and later sold family photos door-to-door. Throughout the 1950s, Lear and Simmons turned out comedy sketches for television appearances of Martin and Lewis, Rowan and Martin, and others. They frequently wrote for Martin and Lewis when they appeared on the Colgate Comedy Hour, and a 1953 article from Billboard magazine stated that Lear and Simmons were guaranteed a record-breaking $52,000 (equivalent to $630,000 in 2025) each to write for five additional Martin and Lewis appearances on the Colgate Comedy Hour that year. In addition, their revised 1953 contract also removed exclusive writing requirements for Lear and Simmons and allowed them to take on other work, such as developing their own TV film package, and writing scripts for other TV shows, either live or on film. In a 2015 interview with Variety, Lear said that Jerry Lewis had hired him and Simmons as writers for Martin and Lewis three weeks before the comedy duo made their first appearance on the Colgate Comedy Hour in 1950. Lear also acknowledged in 1986 that he and Simmons were the main writers for The Martin and Lewis Show for three years.

In 1954, Lear was enlisted as a writer and asked to salvage the new CBS sitcom starring Celeste Holm, Honestly, Celeste!, but the program was canceled after eight episodes. During this time he became the producer of NBC's short-lived (26 episodes) sitcom The Martha Raye Show, after Nat Hiken left as the series director. Lear also wrote some of the opening monologs for The Tennessee Ernie Ford Show which aired from 1956 to 1961. In 1959, Lear created his first television series, a half-hour western for Revue Studios called The Deputy, starring Henry Fonda.

Though not reported to have taken part in writing the 2000 Year Old Man, it was revealed in 1973 that Lear's home in Fire Island, New York was in fact the place where Carl Reiner and Mel Brooks initially performed their 2000 Year Old Man routines.

=== 1967–1977 ===
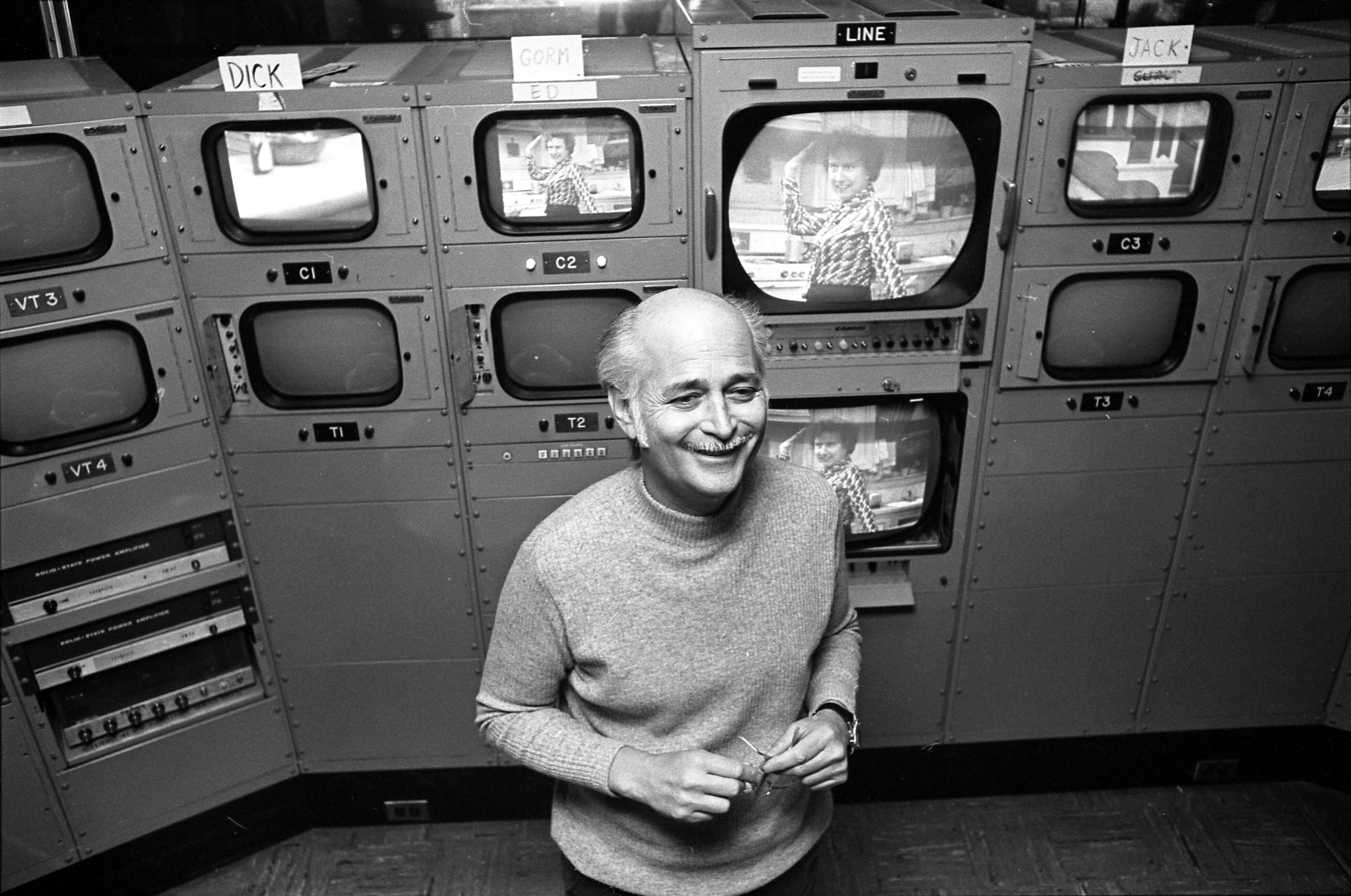
Lear standing before a bank of camera monitors in 1975

Starting out as a comedy writer, then a film director (he wrote and produced the 1967 film Divorce American Style and directed the 1971 film Cold Turkey, both starring Dick Van Dyke), Lear tried to sell a concept for a sitcom about a blue-collar American family to ABC. They rejected the show after two pilots were taped: Justice for All in 1968 and Those Were the Days in 1969. After a third pilot was taped, CBS picked up the show, known as All in the Family. It premiered on January 12, 1971, to disappointing ratings, but it took home several Emmy Awards that year, including Outstanding Comedy Series. The show did very well in summer reruns, and it flourished in the 1971–72 season, becoming the top-rated show on TV for the next five years. After falling from the No. 1 spot, All in the Family still remained in the top ten, with the exception of the 1976-1977 television season where it ranked No. 12, and eventually became Archie Bunker's Place. The show was based loosely on the British sitcom Till Death Us Do Part, about an irascible working-class Tory and his socialist son-in-law.

Lear's second big TV sitcom, Sanford and Son, was also based on a British sitcom, Steptoe and Son, about a west London junk dealer and his son. Lear changed the setting to the Watts section of Los Angeles and the characters to African Americans, and the NBC show Sanford and Son was an instant hit. Numerous hit shows followed thereafter, including Maude, The Jeffersons (both spin-offs of All in the Family), One Day at a Time, and Good Times (which is a spinoff of Maude).

Most of these Lear sitcoms share three features: they were shot on videotape in place of film, used a live studio audience, and dealt with current social and political issues. Maude is generally considered to be based on Lear's wife Frances, which she confirmed, with Charlie Hauck serving as main producer and writer.

Lear's longtime producing partner was Bud Yorkin, who also produced All in the Family, Sanford and Son, What's Happening!!, Maude, and The Jeffersons. Yorkin split with Lear in 1975. He started a production company with writers and producers Saul Turteltaub and Bernie Orenstein; however, only two of their shows lasted longer than a year: What's Happening!! and Carter Country. The Lear/Yorkin company was known as Tandem Productions and was founded in 1958. Lear and talent agent Jerry Perenchio founded T.A.T. Communications ("T.A.T." stood for the Yiddish phrase tuchus affen tisch, "putting one's ass on the line") in 1974, which co-existed with Tandem Productions and was often referred to in periodicals as Tandem/T.A.T. The Lear organization was one of the most successful independent TV producers of the 1970s. TAT produced the influential and award-winning 1981 film The Wave about Ron Jones' social experiment.

Lear also developed the cult favorite TV series Mary Hartman, Mary Hartman (MH MH) which was turned down by the networks as "too controversial" and placed it into first run syndication with 128 stations in January 1976. A year later, he added another program into first-run syndication along with MH MH, All That Glitters. He planned in 1977 to offer three hours of prime-time Saturday programming directly having stations place his production company in the position of an occasional network.

In 1977, African-American screenwriter Eric Monte filed a lawsuit accusing ABC and CBS producers Norman Lear, Bud Yorkin, and others of stealing his ideas for Good Times, The Jeffersons, and What's Happening!! Monte received a $1-million settlement and a small percentage of the residuals from Good Times and one percent ownership of the show. Monte, due to his lack of business knowledge and experience as well as legal representation, would not receive royalties for other shows that he created. However, Lear and other Hollywood producers, outraged over the lawsuit, reportedly blacklisted Monte and labeled him too difficult to work with.

=== 1980–1999 ===
In 1980, Lear founded the organization People for the American Way for the purpose of counteracting the Christian right group Moral Majority which had been founded in 1979. In the fall of 1981, Lear began a 14-month run as the host of a revival of the classic game show Quiz Kids for the CBS Cable Network. In January 1982, Lear and Jerry Perenchio bought Avco Embassy Pictures from Avco Financial Corporation. In January 1982, after merging with company with T.A.T. Communications, the Avco was dropped, and the combined entity was renamed as Embassy Communications, Inc. Embassy Pictures was led by Alan Horn and Martin Schaeffer, later co-founders of Castle Rock Entertainment with Rob Reiner.

In March 1982, Lear produced an ABC television special titled I Love Liberty, as a counterbalance to groups like the Moral Majority. Among the many guests who appeared on the special was conservative icon and the 1964 U.S. presidential election's Republican nominee Barry Goldwater.

On June 18, 1985, Lear and Perenchio sold Embassy Communications to Columbia Pictures (then owned by The Coca-Cola Company), which acquired Embassy's film and television division (including Embassy's in-house television productions and the television rights to the Embassy theatrical library) for $485 million of shares of The Coca-Cola Company. The brand Tandem Productions was abandoned in 1986 with the cancellation of Diff'rent Strokes, and Embassy ceased to exist as a single entity in late 1986, having been split into different components owned by different entities. Coca-Cola sold the film division to Dino De Laurentiis and the home video arm to Nelson Holdings (led by Barry Spikings). The TV properties continued under the Columbia Pictures Television banner.

Lear's Act III Communications was founded in 1986 and in the following year, Thomas B. McGrath was named president and chief operating officer of ACT III Communications Inc after previously serving as senior vice president. On February 2, 1989, Norman Lear's Act III Communications formed a joint venture with Columbia Pictures Television called Act III Television to produce television series instead of managing.

In the late 1980s and early 1990s, Act III Communications purchased several business journals, including Channels magazine that had been founded by Les Brown, former New York Times TV correspondent. Channels closed in 1990, by which time Act III and Brown published and edited Television Business International (TBI). Act III Broadcasting would at one point own numerous Fox-affiliated televisions stations as well. Act III Broadcasting would be sold in 1995 for $500 million. In 1992, Act III was sued by Platt Amusement, which claimed that the company had in 1990 “induced and persuaded” GE Capital Corporate Finance to deny them a loan, which gotten approved financing, and then created a theater monopoly in the Pacific Northwest. Act III's theater division would eventually by sold in October 1997.

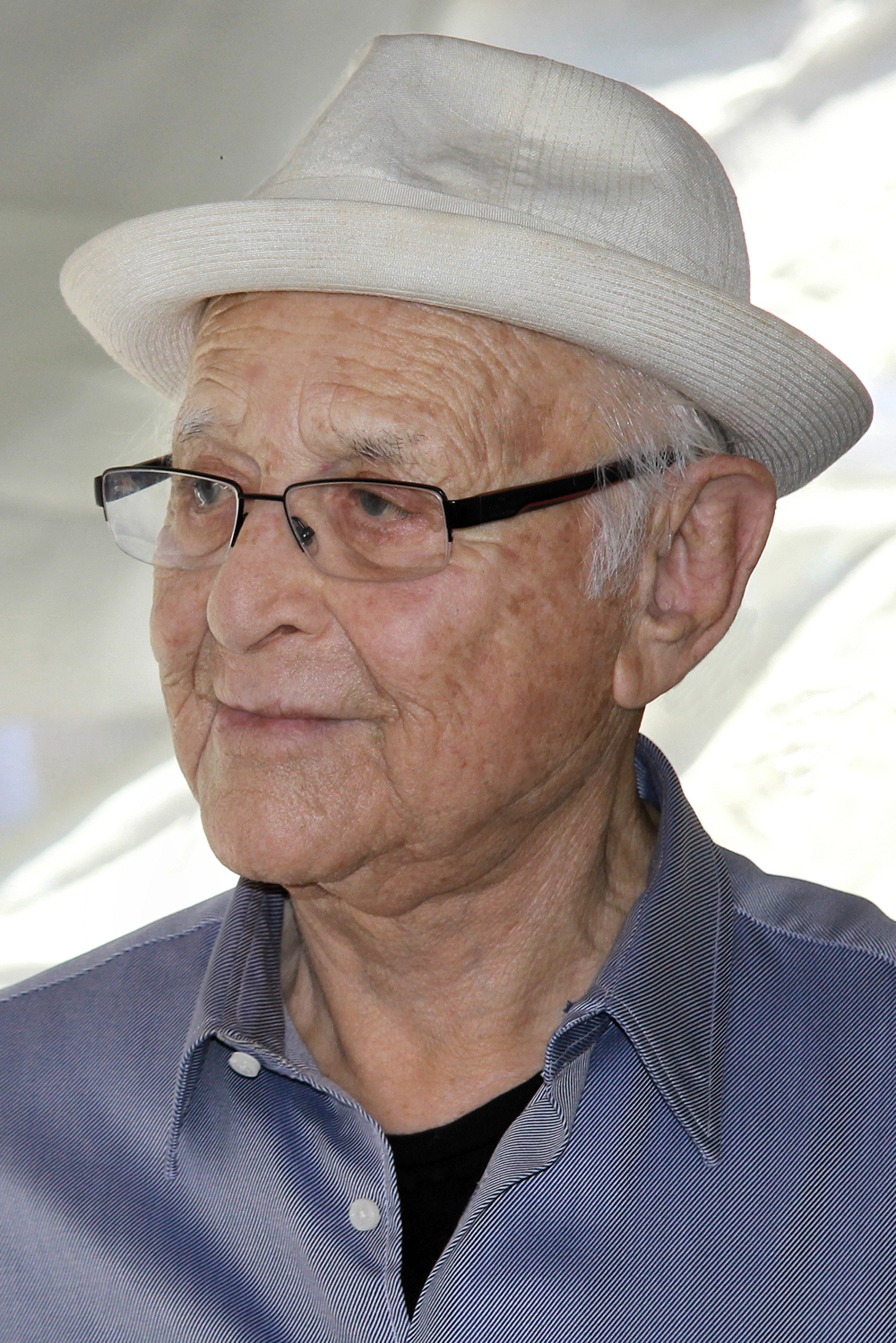
Lear at the Texas Book Festival in 2014

In 1997, Lear and Jim George produced the Kids' WB series Channel Umptee-3. The cartoon was notable for being the first television show to meet the Federal Communications Commission's then-new educational programming requirements. In his memoir Even This I Get To Experience. Lear made an allegation that he and his son provided writing and creative input for two books in the late 1990s, including Hillary Clinton's book Dear Socks. Contrary to this claim, however, Hillary's collaborator, and potential ghostwriter, for Dear Socks, Dear Buddy was acknowledged to be Washington D.C.-based journalist Linda Kulman.

=== 2000–2023 ===
In 2003, Lear appeared on South Park during the "I'm a Little Bit Country" episode, providing the voice of Benjamin Franklin. He also served as a consultant on the episodes "I'm a Little Bit Country" and "Cancelled". Lear attended a South Park writers' retreat, with some of his ideas making it onto South Park. Further, he was the officiant at co-creator Trey Parker's wedding. South Park served as a bond between Lear and his son Benjamin, who was not familiar with his more known work from the 1970s.

In 2014, Lear published Even This I Get to Experience, a memoir.

Lear is spotlighted in the 2016 documentary Norman Lear: Just Another Version of You. In 2017, he served as executive producer for One Day at a Time, the reboot of his 1975–1984 show of the same name that premiered on Netflix starring Justina Machado and Rita Moreno as a Cuban-American family. He hosted a podcast, All of the Above with Norman Lear, since May 1, 2017. On July 29, 2019, it was announced that Lear had teamed with Lin-Manuel Miranda to make an American Masters documentary about Moreno's life, tentatively titled Rita Moreno: Just a Girl Who Decided to Go for It.

In 2020, it was announced that Lear and Act III Productions would executive produce a revival of Who's the Boss?. At the time of his death in 2023, he was overseeing multiple shows in development, including a planned reboot of Mary Hartman, Mary Hartman. His last finished project to come out was the Amazon series Clean Slate, which came out in February 2025, and was in the editing process after finishing filming when he died.

== Awards, honors, and legacy ==
Lear wrote and produced more than 100 television shows during a career that lasted over 70 years. He has been honored for his influence on American television and culture. His works introduced political and social themes to the sitcom format. Before All in the Family, television sitcoms in the 1950s and 1960s generally portrayed white American family life as comfortable and avoided raising issues such as racial discrimination and patriarchy. Beginning in 1971, All in the Family openly discussed current social and political topics and became the country's most popular show for five straight years. Lear's subsequent shows widened television's representation of racial and gender diversity, such as Good Times, the first television show centered on an African-American nuclear family; Television screenwriter Paddy Chayefsky said that Lear "put the American people [on screen] ... he took the audience and put them on the set".

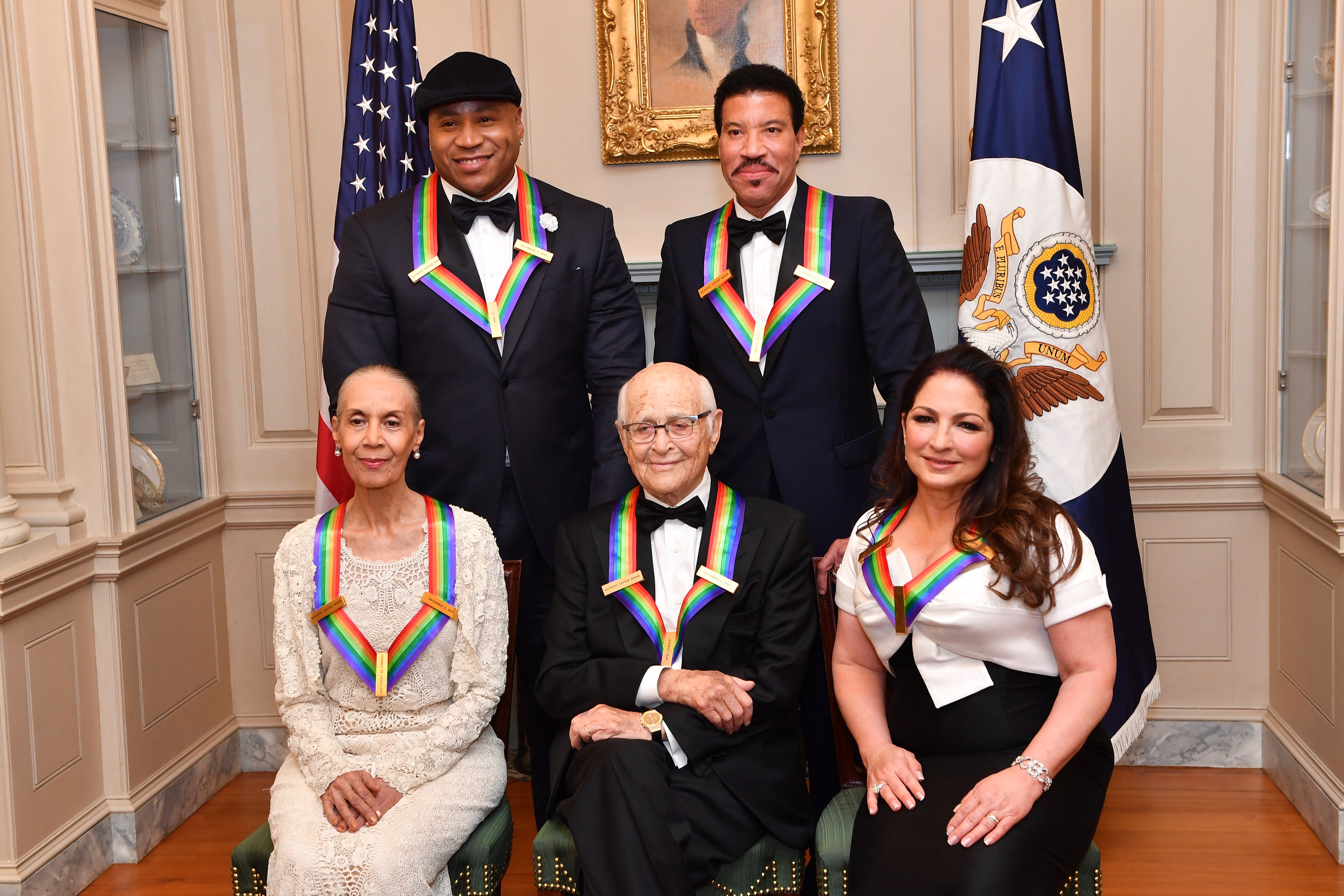
Lear was among the 2017 Kennedy Center Honors recipients.

In 1999, President Bill Clinton awarded Lear the National Medal of Arts, noting: "Norman Lear has held up a mirror to American society and changed the way we look at it." That year, he and Bud Yorkin received the Women in Film Lucy Award in recognition of excellence and innovation in creative works that have enhanced the perception of women through the medium of television. The Producers Guild of America awarded Lear its Achievement Award in Television in 2006; by the next year, the honor was named the Norman Lear Achievement Award in Television. In 2017, he was awarded the fourth annual Woody Guthrie Prize presented by the Woody Guthrie Center, recognizing an artist whose work represents the spirit of Woody Guthrie "as a positive force for social change". He became the oldest recipient of the Kennedy Center Honors later that year at the age of 95. In 2018, Lear's alma mater, Emerson College, unveiled a bronze statue of him on campus.

Lear's star on the Hollywood Walk of Fame is located at 6615 Hollywood Boulevard. He received other numerous honorary accolades, including:

- 1977: Peabody Awards: Lifetime achievement
- 1977: American Humanist Association: Humanist Arts Award
- 1980: Academy of Achievement Golden Plate Award
- 1984: Television Academy: Hall of Fame
- 2007: Britannia Awards Excellence in Television
- 2017: National Hispanic Media Coalition Media Icon
- 2017: Peabody Awards: Lifetime achievement

== Political and cultural activities ==
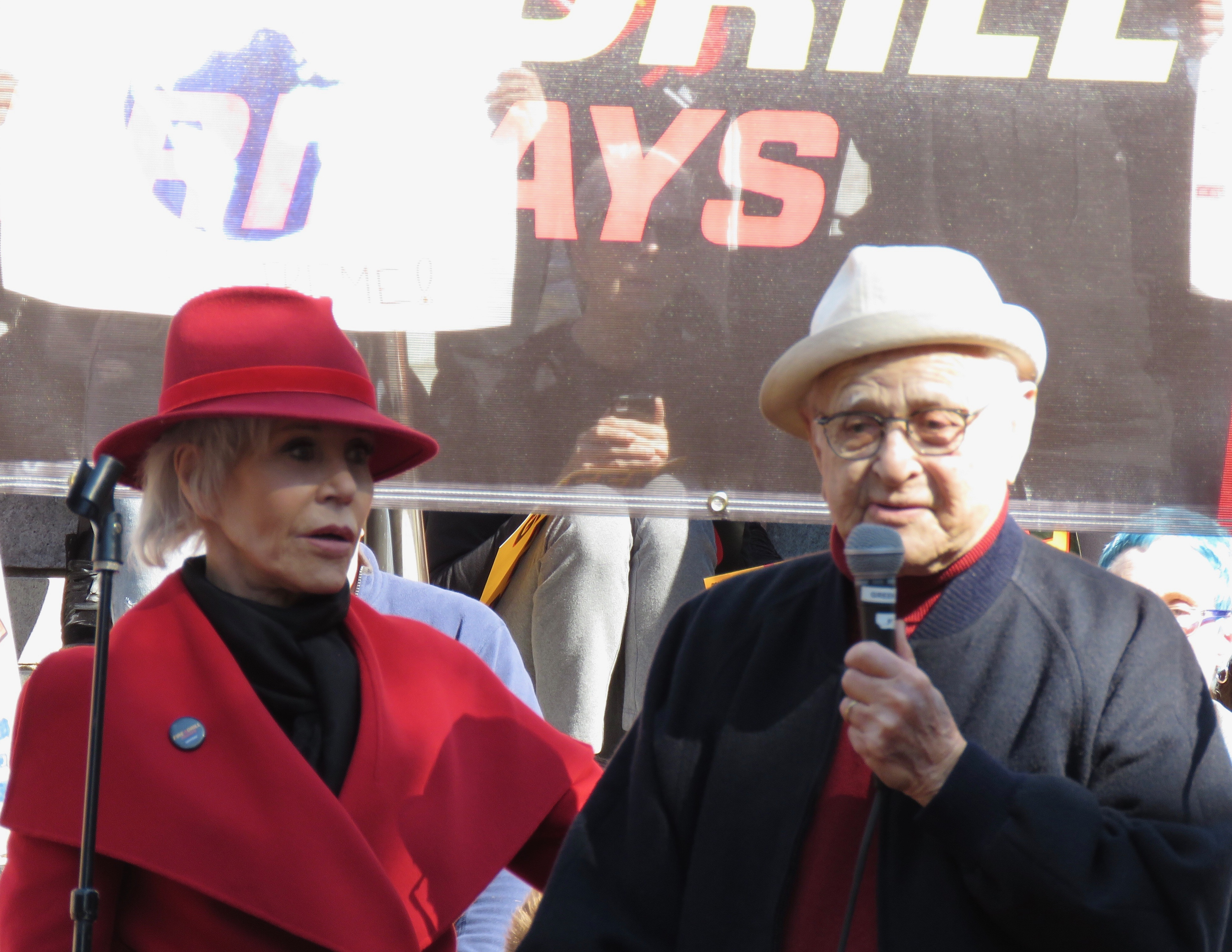
Jane Fonda and Norman Lear at a climate change awareness rally in 2020

Lear was an outspoken supporter of First Amendment and liberal causes. The only time that he did not support the Democratic candidate for president was in 1980 when he supported John Anderson over Jimmy Carter because he considered the Carter administration to be "a complete disaster".

Lear was one of the wealthy Jewish Angelenos known as the Malibu Mafia. In the 1970s and 1980s, the group discussed progressive and liberal political issues, and worked together to fund them. They helped to fund the legal defense of Daniel Ellsberg who had released the Pentagon Papers, and they backed the struggling progressive magazine The Nation to keep it afloat. In 1975, they formed the Energy Action Committee to oppose Big Oil's powerful lobby in Washington.

In 2004, Lear established Declare Yourself, which is a national nonpartisan, nonprofit campaign created to empower and encourage eligible 18- to 29-year-olds in America to register and vote.

In 2015, Lear was one of 98 "prominent members of Los Angeles' Jewish community" who signed an open letter supporting the proposed nuclear agreement between Iran and six world powers led by the United States. The letter called for the passage of the bill and warned that the ending of the agreement by Congress would be a "tragic mistake".

=== People for the American Way ===
In 1981, Lear founded People for the American Way (PFAW), a progressive advocacy organization formed in reaction to the politics of the Christian right. PFAW ran several advertising campaigns opposing the interjection of religion in politics. PFAW and other like-minded groups succeeded in their efforts to block Reagan's 1987 nomination of Robert Bork to the Supreme Court. Lear, a longtime critic of the Religious Right, was an advocate for the advancement of secularism.

Prominent right-wing Christians including Pat Robertson, Jerry Falwell, and Jimmy Swaggart have accused Lear of being an atheist and holding an anti-Christian bias. In the January 21, 1987, issue of The Christian Century, Lear associate Martin E. Marty (a Lutheran professor of church history at the University of Chicago Divinity School between 1963 and 1998) rejected those allegations, stating the television producer honored religious moral values and complimenting Lear's understanding of Christianity. Marty noted that while Lear and his family had never practiced Orthodox Judaism, the television producer was a follower of Judaism.

In a 2009 interview with US News journalist Dan Gilgoff, Lear rejected claims by right-wing Christian nationalists that he was an atheist and prejudiced against Christianity. Lear held religious beliefs and integrated some evangelical Christian language into his Born Again American campaign. He believed that religion should be kept separate from politics and policymaking. In a 2014 interview with The Jewish Journal of Greater Los Angeles journalist Rob Eshman, Lear described himself as a "total Jew" but said he was never a practicing one.

In 1989, Lear founded the Business Enterprise Trust, an educational program that used annual awards, business school case studies, and videos to spotlight exemplary social innovations in American business until it ended in 1998. He announced in 1992 that he was reducing his political activism. In 2000, he provided an endowment for a multidisciplinary research and public policy center, the Norman Lear Center, that explored the convergence of entertainment, commerce, and society at the USC Annenberg School for Communication and Journalism.

Lear served on the National Advisory Board of the Young Storytellers Foundation. He wrote articles for The Huffington Post. He was a trustee of The Paley Center for Media.

In his memoir, Lear alleged that he offered Bill Clinton, who has himself acknowledged to have befriended Lear after meeting him in New York in 1981, the position of honorary chair of People for the American Way after meeting him for the first time in 1982, with Clinton declining Lear's offer but still "had a great time together and remained friends;" despite Lear's claim of offering him this position in 1982, Clinton was in fact seeking to win back his previous post as Governor of Arkansas that year.

=== Declaration of Independence ===
In 2001, Lear and his wife, Lyn, purchased a Dunlap broadside—one of the first published copies of the United States Declaration of Independence—for $8.1 million. John Dunlap printed about 200 copies of the Declaration of Independence on July 4, 1776. As of 2000, 25 copies were still in existence and only four were in private hands.

Lear said in a press release and on the Today show that his intent was to tour the document around the United States so that the country could experience its "birth certificate" firsthand. Through the end of 2004, the document traveled throughout the United States on the Declaration of Independence Road Trip, which Lear organized, visiting several presidential libraries, dozens of museums, as well as the 2002 Olympics, Super Bowl XXXVI, and the Live 8 concert in Philadelphia. Lear and Rob Reiner produced a filmed, dramatic reading of the Declaration of Independence—the last project filmed by famed cinematographer Conrad Hall—on July 4, 2001, at Independence Hall in Philadelphia. The film is introduced by Morgan Freeman. Kathy Bates, Benicio del Toro, Michael Douglas, Mel Gibson, Whoopi Goldberg, Graham Greene, Ming-Na Wen, Edward Norton, Winona Ryder, Kevin Spacey, and Renée Zellweger appear as readers. It was directed by Arvin Brown and scored by John Williams.

== Personal life and death ==
Lear was married three times. His first marriage was to Charlotte Rosen in 1943. They divorced in 1956.

He was married to Frances Loeb from 1956 to 1985. They separated in 1983. Loeb eventually received $112 million from Lear in their divorce settlement, and she used part of the settlement to found Lear's magazine.

In 1987, Lear married Lyn Davis, who survived him. When she met Lear in 1984, Lyn was reportedly in the process of earning a doctorate in clinical psychology. She later became a documentary filmmaker through her production company Lyn Lear Productions. At the time of 2016 documentary Norman Lear: Just Another Version of You, Lyn acknowledged that she and Norman had "very different worlds," with their daytime relationship at that point being largely centered around occasional conversations, while having nightly dinners together.

From his three marriages, Lear had six children. He was a godparent to actress and singer Katey Sagal.

At the ATX 2016 ATX Television Festival, Lear publicly noted to Sagal that he by that point in time didn't "try to keep up any more" with the modern day array of television, though he still regularly watched South Park. Though also openly expressing some positive support for work of Seth MacFarlane, Lear actually did not regard Family Guy or American Dad! in the same way he regarded South Park, which he and his son could also bond over, noting in a 2015 public conversation with MacFarlane that despite the quality of MacFarlane's work, he also felt that it was among the shows that had "very little context now;" MacFarlane has also acknowledged that Family Guy was heavily influenced by not just All In The Family, but also South Park rival The Simpsons. Lear even alleged at his 2022 Norman Lear: 100 Years of Music and Laughter TV special that "There's nobody in our business I have admired more over a long time, than [South Park creators] Trey Parker and Matt Stone."

Lear died at his Los Angeles home on December 5, 2023, from cardiac arrest as a complication of heart failure. He was 101. Lear's body was cremated.

== Filmography ==
=== Film ===
Year	Title	Writer	Director	Producer
1963	Come Blow Your Horn	Yes	No	Yes
1965	Never Too Late	No	No	Yes
1967	Divorce American Style	Yes	No	Yes
1968	The Night They Raided Minsky's	Yes	No	Yes
1970	Start the Revolution Without Me	No	No	Executive
1971	Cold Turkey	Yes	Yes	Yes
1987	The Princess Bride	No	No	Executive
1991	Fried Green Tomatoes	No	No	Executive
2021	Rita Moreno: Just a Girl Who Decided to Go for It	No	No	Executive

=== Television ===
Year	Title	Creator/ Developer	Writer	Executive Producer	Notes
1950–1953	The Colgate Comedy Hour	No	Yes	No	
1954–1956	The Martha Raye Show	No	Yes	No	
1957–1958	The Tennessee Ernie Ford Show	No	Yes	No	
1958–1959	The George Gobel Show	No	Yes	No	
1959–1961	The Deputy	Yes	Yes	No	
1971–1979	All in the Family	Yes	Yes	Yes	
1972–1977	Sanford and Son	Yes	No	Yes	Uncredited
1972–1978	Maude	Yes	No	Yes	
1974–1979	Good Times	Yes	No	Yes	
1975–1985	The Jeffersons	Yes	No	Yes	
1975	Hot l Baltimore	Yes	No	Yes	
1975–1984	One Day at a Time	Yes	No	Yes	
1975	A Year at the Top	No	No	Yes	
1976–1977	Mary Hartman, Mary Hartman	Yes	No	Yes	
1976	The Dumplings	Yes	No	No	
1976–1977	All's Fair	Yes	No	No	
1976–1977	The Nancy Walker Show	Yes	No	Yes	
1977	All That Glitters	Yes	No	Yes	
1977	Fernwood 2 Night	Yes	No	No	
1977	Sanford Arms	Yes	No	No	Uncredited
1978	America 2-Night	Yes	No	No	
1978	In the Beginning	Yes	No	No	
1978	Apple Pie	Yes	No	No	
1978–1986	Diff'rent Strokes	Yes	No	Yes	
1979	Hanging In	No	No	Yes	
1979–1981	The Baxters	Yes	No	Yes	
1980–1981	Palmerstown, U.S.A.	Yes	No	Yes	
1982	I Love Liberty	Yes	Yes	Yes	TV special
1984	a.k.a. Pablo	Yes	Yes	Yes	
1984	Heartsounds	No	No	Yes	TV movie
1991	Sunday Dinner	Yes	Yes	Yes	
1992–1993	The Powers That Be	No	No	Yes	
1994	704 Hauser	Yes	Yes	Yes	
1997–1998	Channel Umptee-3	Yes	No	Yes	
2017–2020	One Day at a Time	No	No	Yes	
2018	Guess Who Died	Yes	Yes	Yes	Pilot
2019–2021	Live in Front of a Studio Audience	No	No	Yes	
2024	Good Times	No	No	Yes	posthumous release
2025	Clean Slate	No	No	Yes	posthumous release
2025	Boots	No	No	Yes	posthumous release

== Bibliography ==
- Lear, Norman. "Liberty and Its Responsibilities". Broadcast Journalism, 1979–1981. The Eighth Alfred I. DuPont Columbia University Survey, Ed. By Marvin Barrett. New York: Everest House, 1982. ISBN 978-0-896-96160-9. OCLC 8347364.
- Lear, Norman. "Our Political Leaders Mustn't Be Evangelists", USA Today, August 17, 1984.
- Lear, Norman and Ronald Reagan. "A Debate on Religious Freedom", Harper's Magazine, October 1984.
- Lear, Norman. "Our Fragile Tower of Greed and Debt", The Washington Post, April 5, 1987.
- Lear, Norman. Even This I Get to Experience. New York: The Penguin Press, 2014. ISBN 978-1-594-20572-9. OCLC 870919776.
