= Janus (play) =

1955 play by Carolyn Green

- Written by: Carolyn Green
- Original language: English
- Genre: romantic comedy

Premiere
- Date premiered: 1955-1956
- Place premiered: Plymouth Theatre

Janus is a 1955 romantic comedy play by Carolyn Green.

== Synopsis ==
The action concerns two people, Jessica and Denny (married, but not to each other), who get together in New York for a couple of months each year, to engage romantically and also to write a novel each year, which novels (published under the pen name "Janus") are regularly best-sellers. Jessica's husband (a shipping tycoon) turns up for a surprise visit, and complications ensue, including a dogged taxman who is after Denny for false tax filings – specifically, not claiming enough deductions. The taxman proves that the shipping tycoon owes enormous taxes on his wife's earnings, and so for their financial well-being – and since Jessica is so charming about it all – he accepts the arrangement, and all ends well.

== Background ==
Janus was produced on Broadway for the 1955–1956 season, at the Plymouth Theatre. The play opened on November 25, 1955, and closed on June 30, 1956, after 251 performances. Margaret Sullavan and Claude Dauphin played the two principals; the other players were Robert Preston, Robert Emhardt, and Mary Finney. The director was Reginald Denham.

== Reception ==
John Chapman (drama critic for the New York Daily News) praised the acting and described it as "an old style French sex farce", "enjoyably light minded" despite "a number of structural faults", but that ultimately "I don't think the play would get far without its cast". the New York Times described Janus as "wild and enjoyable". Life magazine said "Playwright Carolyn Green keeps Janus spinning brightly while making clear that this is a tale meant to be amusing rather than believed". But the Harvard Crimson reviewing a 1957 production at a different Plymouth Theatre, in Boston, with Joan Bennett and Romney Brent playing the principals, scored the play as "poorly crafted" and "heavy handed, and for the most part, unfunny", although still a "more or less tolerable evening of inane froth".

== Revivals and adaptations ==
Janus was performed occasionally in local and regional theatre, including the Cape Playhouse on Cape Cod in Massachusetts (1957, featuring Joan Bennett and Donald Cook; 1963, with Allen Ludden and Betty White), the Hanna Theatre in Cleveland (1956, with Joan Bennett), and the Paper Mill Playhouse in New Jersey, (1965, with June Allyson, Scott McKay, and Imogene Coca). A 1969 production featuring Myrna Loy and William Roerick opened in Denver and played in New Hampshire, Cape Cod, and Corning, New York. A Dutch translation (under the name Wie is Janus? (Who is Janus?)) was presented in the Netherlands in 1958, with Mary Dresselhuys and Louis Borel, and shown on Dutch television in 1967. A Swedish translation was shown on Swedish television in 1965. Brian Brooke produced and directed Janus at his Brooke Theater in Johannesburg, South Africa, featuring Gordon Mulholland, in 1958.
