= Mary Finney =

American stage and television actress (born 1906)

- Born: Mary Whaley; September 30, 1906; Spokane, Washington, U.S.
- Died: February 26, 1973 (aged 66); New York City, New York, U.S.
- Other name: Marye Finney
- Education: North Central High School; University of Oregon; Pasadena Playhouse College of Theatre Arts
- Occupation: Actress

Mary Finney (born Mary Whaley; September 30, 1906 – February 26, 1973) was an American comic character actress of stage and television. She co-starred on Celeste Holm's short-lived sitcom Honestly, Celeste!.

== Early life and career ==
Finney, born Mary Whaley in Spokane, Washington, was the second child born to burlesque performers Mary Hindman and James Whaley, alias Frank Finney. (The first, James Mathew Whaley—a.k.a. James Finney—had died five months after his first birthday on December 1, 1905.) She attended North Central High School, class of 1924 (where she contributed a regular column to the school's award-winning newspaper), and then the University of Oregon, majoring in journalism.

On March 31, 1924, as reported by both The Spokane Press and Spokesman-Review the following day, Finney, then 17 and a senior at North Central High, made her professional debut with her father's company, the Laughlanders.

Marye Finney [sic], daughter of Frank Finney, was introduced to the dramatic world by her father Monday night at the Auditorium in the Laughlanders' show, 'A Trip to Hollywood.' Finney's daughter stopped the show when she sang 'I'm Not That Kind of a Girl.' Flowers were rushed over the footlights and Marye now ranks as assistant comedian of the 'Laughlanders.' [...] Finney possesses the something that makes a comedienne and she won't have to hold her place on the stage in reflected glory. Her poise and savoir faire suggest a stage training and not a first night.

She was rewarded with considerably larger roles in the company's next two shows: the secretly married maid of Tiddledy Winks and the fairy queen in Woogie Woogie Land.

Finney performed in little theatre productions in the mid 1930s in Spokane, Washington, and a decade later at the Pasadena Playhouse College of Theatre Arts, where, for what appears to the first and only time in her career (stretching as far back as high school), she was credited under her birth name, Mary Whaley. This continued for more than two years, until November 1946, when, as the mother in Vina Delmar's A Rich, Full Life, she reverted to the family stage name.), that Mary resumed use of the stage name, Finney.

Beginning in the fall of 1948 and continuing through the winter, Finney appeared in numerous productions of Margo Jones' Theater '48, including revivals of Oscar Wilde's The Importance of Being Earnest and Molière's The Learned Ladies, portraying Lady Bracknell and Philamente, respectively.

In 1950, under the direction of Jones, Finney made her Broadway debut as Mary Belle Tucker in Owen Crump's Southern Exposure, prompting Daily News critic John Chapman to hail the arrival of "the funniest character woman" he had seen since the performance, three decades earlier, of comedienne May Vokes in the Mary Rinehart/Avery Hopwood hit play The Bat. (Note: Chapman's comment, in and of itself, leaves open the possibility that he is actually referring to the 1937 revival, in which Vokes also appeared, rather than The Bat's 1920 premiere. Any such uncertainties, however, are dispelled unequivocally, albeit inadvertently, in a Chapman piece published almost two years later, previewing the upcoming 1952 Broadway revival of the 1920 stage hit.)

Miss Finney, as the tourist-leader, must be seen. It is an adventure to watch her walk down a few stairs and another adventure to see her separate herself from a sofa.

Subsequent Broadway appearances elicited praise from critics such as Joe Morgenstern of the Herald Tribune, Howard Taubman of the Times, and Martin Gottfried of Women's Wear Daily. Louis Sheaffer of The Brooklyn Eagle, reviewing the 1952 playwright-helmed revival of Lillian Hellman's The Children's Hour, commends Finney's "brilliant characterization" for "catch[ing] all the anemic viciousness of the aunt". Just three days later, the Eagle's critic felt compelled to elaborate.

I don't think Mary Finney was given sufficient credit by most of the other reviewers for her vivid, merciless portrayal as the aunt. She illuminated the woman's skinny little soul so completely that I couldn't help feeling a grudging pity for the spiteful, pathetic character.

Regarding Finney's modest television resume, little has been written. One brief but notable exception concerns the Kraft Television Theatre episode "We Haven't Seen Her Lately," described by Herald Tribune critic Sid Bakal as a "flimsy affair that wallowed along in dull confusion" and clearly represented "a step in the wrong direction for this series," and, more to the point, one in which only "George Scott [i.e. George C. Scott], Angela Thornton and Mary Finney managed to rise above the script. The rest of the cast did not."

== Death ==
On February 26, 1973, unmarried and with no living next of kin, Finney died at age 66 of emphysema in Manhattan.

== Acting credits ==
=== Theatre ===
Year	Title	Role	Notes
1944	It's a Wild Child	Mother (as Mary Whaley)	Little Theatre (Pasadena Playhouse)
1944	Ned McCobb's Daughter	Carrie McCobb (as Mary Whaley)	Little Theatre (Pasadena Playhouse)
1945	Mary, Queen of Scots	Elizabeth Tudor (as Mary Whaley)	Little Theatre (Pasadena Playhouse)
1945	Blithe Spirit	Madame Arcati (as Mary Whaley)	Little Theatre (Pasadena Playhouse)
1947	Night Must Fall	Mrs. Bramson	Summer stock
1948	Lemple's Old Man		Regional theater (Theater '48)
1948	The Importance of Being Earnest	Lady Bracknell	Regional theater (Theater '48)
1948	The Learned Ladies	Philaminte	Regional theater (Theater '48)
1948	Here's to Us	Kit Tremaine	Regional theater (Theater '48)
1949	Skaal	Ragna	Regional theater (Theater '49)
1949	Sting in the Tail	Louisa Hackett	Regional theater (Theater '49)
1949	Coast of Illyria	Mrs. Kelly	Regional theater (Theater '49)
1950	Southern Exposure	Duchess of Orleans	Regional theater (Theater '50)
1950	My Granny Van	Granny Van	Regional theater (Theater '50)
1950	Southern Exposure	Mary Belle Tucker	Broadway
1950	The Cellar and the Well	Miss Triumph	Broadway
1951	Make a Wish	The Madam; Dr. Didier (understudy)	Broadway
1952	The Children's Hour	Mrs. Lily Mortar	Broadway
1954	The Magic and the Loss	Anita Dawson (replacement)	Broadway
1955	The Honeys	Nellie Fleischman	Broadway
1955	Janus	Miss Addy	Broadway
1956	Happy Hunting	Maud Foley	Broadway
1959	First Impressions	Lady Catherine de Bourgh	Broadway
1960	Whisper to Me	Sister Sammye	Off Broadway
1964	Too Much Johnson	Mrs. Batterson	Off Broadway

=== Television ===
Year	Title	Role	Notes
1950	Armstrong Circle Theatre		1 episode
1953	Lux Video Theatre		1 episode
1954	Honestly, Celeste!	Mr. Wallace's secretary	2 episodes
1958	Decoy	Gladys Shriner	1 episode: "Blind Date"
1958	Kraft Television Theatre	Aunt Lucy, Aunt Violet, ?	3 episodes: "The Spell of the Tigress", "We Haven't Seen Her Lately", "Trick or Treat"
1960	CBS Television Workshop		1 episode: "The Limbo Kid"
1960	U.S. Steel Hour	Ring One (telephone operator)	1 episode: "Shame the Devil"
1960	Play of the Week	Leonide Mangebois	1 episode: "The Enchanted"
1961; 1962	The Defenders	Mrs. Johnson; Genevieve Clarendon	2 episodes: "The Young Lovers", "Grandma TNT"
