= Honestly, Celeste! =

American television situation comedy

- Genre: Sitcom
- Written by: Larry Gelbart; Norman Lear; Hal Collins; Ed Simmons
- Directed by: Joseph Scibetta; Dave Alexander
- Starring: Celeste Holm; Scott McKay; Geoffrey Lumb; Mary Finney; Mike Kellin
- Music by: Jerry Fielding
- Country of origin: United States

Production
- Producers: Joseph Scibetta; Dave Alexander

Original release
- Network: CBS
- Release: October 10 – December 5, 1954

Honestly, Celeste! is an American television sitcom that was broadcast on CBS from October 10, 1954, to December 5, 1954. It starred Celeste Holm in her first regular TV series.

== Premise, cast and characters ==
Celeste Anders left her position as a college journalism teacher in the American Midwest to work as a reporter at a newspaper in New York City. As a reporter, she devoted "virtually all of her time to being a Good Samaritan to everyone she meets."

Actors and the characters they portrayed were as follows:

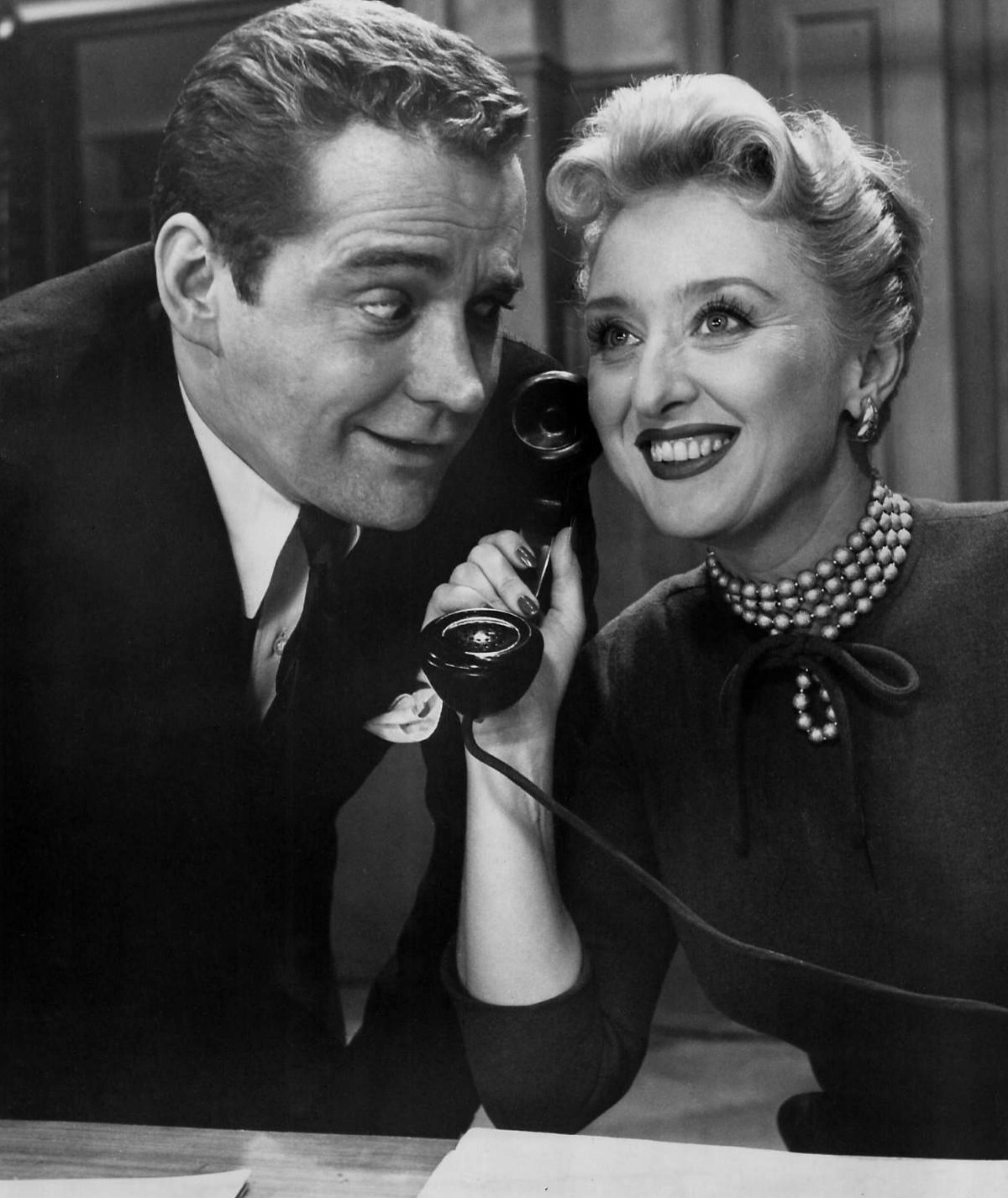
Scott McKay and Celeste Holm in Honestly, Celeste!

- Celeste Holm as Celeste Anders
- Scott McKay as Bob Wallace, Anders's friend
- Geoffrey Lumb as Mr. Wallace, Bob's father and editor of the newspaper
- Mary Finney as Mary, Mr. Wallace's secretary
- Mike Kellin as Marty Gordon, Anders's friend and a former gangster

Themes of episodes included Anders's beginning a new life in New York City, her search for an apartment, and Marty's boredom when he drove a cab.

In a move that The New York Times called "unusual in broadcasting circles", Holm asked to be released from her commitments for Honestly, Celeste! and CBS granted the request. She said later that she felt that Anders lacked audience appeal because the character was too dull. She had hoped to "have some control over the writing", but that did not happen.

== Schedule ==
Honestly, Celeste! was broadcast on Sundays from 9:30 to 10 p.m. Eastern Time. Its competition included Life Begins at Eighty (DuMont), The Philco Television Playhouse alternating with Goodyear Television Playhouse (NBC), and Talent Patrol and its replacement What's Going On (ABC). Honestly, Celeste! was replaced by Stage 7.

== Production ==
Honestly, Celeste! was filmed in Hollywood. Joseph Scibetta was the initial producer and director; and Larry Gelbart was the initial writer. By early November 1954 they had left those roles. Val Adams wrote in The New York Times, "The exact circumstances under which they left could not be learned, but it was reliably reported that there had been differences of opinion among the personnel on the show as to the staging and story line." Dave Alexander became the producer and director. Other writers included Norman Lear, Hal Collins, and Ed Simmons. Jerry Fielding provided the music.

Bristol-Myers was a sponsor.

== Critical response ==
Jack Gould, in a review of the show's premiere episode in The New York Times, noted the overuse of coincidence and repeated switching of apparently identical suitcases (one containing Anders's clothes and the other containing $400,000 in cash) that left the audience confused, as were the characters in the episode. Gould described the episode as an "artificial and shoddy shambles" with "frantic direction". He praised Holm as "a most sprightly and personable artist" who tried with limited success to make the episode seem plausible, but he said that her talent was wasted.

Anton Remenih, writing in the Chicago Daily Tribune, said that Honestly, Celeste! stood out among a glut of new situation comedies in its season not because of the show's quality (perhaps "class B") but because of Holm's presence. "It feels good to have her in the living room," he said. "She's talented, telegenic, and warm.
