= Butterfly McQueen =

American actress (1911–1995)

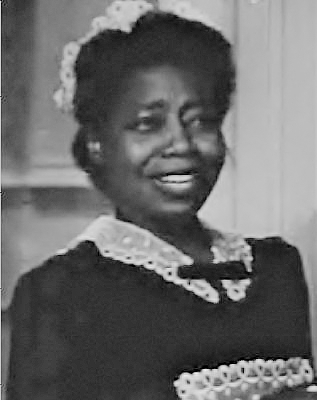
- McQueen in Affectionately Yours (1941)
- Born: Thelma McQueen; January 8, 1911; Tampa, Florida, U.S.
- Died: December 22, 1995 (aged 84); Augusta, Georgia, U.S.
- Education: City College of New York
- Occupation: Actress
- Years active: 1935–1989

Signature
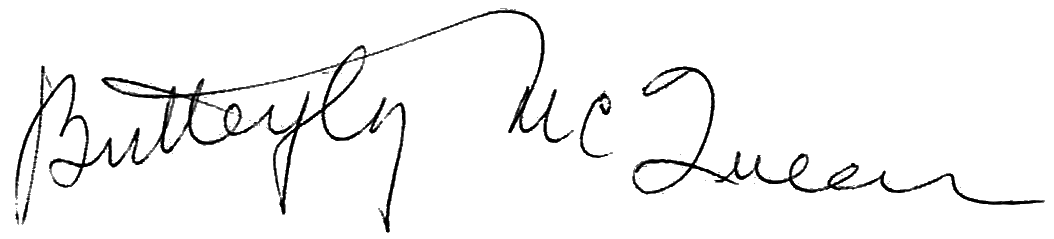

Butterfly McQueen (born Thelma McQueen; January 8, 1911 – December 22, 1995) was an American actress. Originally a dancer, McQueen first appeared on the silver screen as Prissy in Gone with the Wind (1939). She also appeared in the films Cabin in the Sky (1943), Mildred Pierce (1944), and Duel in the Sun (1946).

Often typecast as a maid, she said: "I didn't mind playing a maid the first time, because I thought that was how you got into the business. But after I did the same thing over and over, I resented it. I didn't mind being funny, but I didn't like being stupid." She continued as an actress in film in the 1940s, and then moved to television acting in the 1950s. She won a 1980 Daytime Emmy Award for her performance in the ABC Afterschool Special episode "Seven Wishes of a Rich Kid".

== Early life and education ==
Born January 8, 1911, in Tampa, Florida, Thelma McQueen was the daughter of Mary McQueen, who worked as a maid, and Wallace McQueen, a stevedore or dockworker. She was often babysat by her neighbour from the Bahamas, "and that's why one hears a little British accent." After her parents separated, Thelma lived with her mother in Augusta, Georgia, where she was educated by nuns at a convent. She had planned to become a nurse until a high-school teacher suggested that she try acting. McQueen initially studied with Janet Collins and danced with the Venezuela Jones Negro Youth Group. Around this time she acquired the nickname "Butterfly" – a tribute to her constantly moving hands – for her performance of the Butterfly Ballet in a production of A Midsummer Night's Dream. Disliking her birth name, she later legally changed it to Butterfly McQueen. She performed with the dance troupe of Katherine Dunham before making her professional debut in George Abbott's Brown Sugar.

== Career ==
=== Gone with the Wind ===
McQueen was appearing as a student in the Broadway comedy What a Life in 1938 when she was spotted by Kay Brown, talent scout for producer David O. Selznick, then in pre-production for Gone with the Wind (eventually released in 1939). Brown recommended that McQueen audition for the film. After Selznick saw her screen test, he never considered anyone else and McQueen was cast in the role that would become her most identifiable — Prissy, a simple-minded house maid. She uttered the famous words "Oh, Miss Scarlett! I don't know nothin' 'bout birthin' babies!" In another memorable scene, she sings the line "a few more days for to tote the weary load" from 'My Old Kentucky Home' by Stephen Foster. Her distinctive, high-pitched voice stands out to audiences. While the role is well known to audiences, McQueen did not enjoy playing the part and felt it was demeaning to African-Americans. She was unable to attend the film's premiere because it was held at a whites-only theater, to the chagrin of Selznick.

She later came to embrace the part, appearing before audiences at several screenings for Gone with the Wind's semi-centenary and joining fellow cast-members.

I was miserable, but now I have studied history, I still study, and I listen to the things that are going on in other parts of the world, and I know that's how things were, and in some strides we have gone forward, but in many we have gone many backward steps.

Going into the role, McQueen expected that Selznick would update the story of Margaret Mitchell's novel with a more contemporary setting. She was shocked to learn that she would play a slave, McQueen recounted in 1989 whilst touring for a re-release. "But he was very authentic with the script. I'm glad now that he was, because you can look at the film and see history as it was. You can see where we've come."

=== Other films ===
She had an uncredited bit part as a sales assistant in The Women (1939), filmed after Gone with the Wind but released before it. She also played Butterfly, Rochester's niece and Mary Livingstone's maid, in Jack Benny's radio program in the 1940s. She appeared in an uncredited role in Mildred Pierce (1945) and played a supporting role in Duel in the Sun (1946). By 1947, she had grown tired of the ethnic stereotypes she was required to play and ended her film career. During World War II, McQueen frequently appeared as a comedian on the Armed Forces Radio Service broadcast Jubilee. Many of these broadcasts are available on the Internet Archive.

From 1950 until 1952, she was featured (and briefly reunited with fellow Gone With the Wind actress Hattie McDaniel, who appeared in the first six episodes before withdrawing due to illness) in another racially stereotyped role on the television series Beulah, in which she played Beulah's friend Oriole, a character originated on radio by Ruby Dandridge, who took over the TV role from McQueen in 1952–53. In 1964 she starred alongside Marion Marlowe in the Off-Broadway commercial flop, The Athenian Touch. In a lighter moment, she appeared in a 1969 episode of The Dating Game.

McQueen was in the original version of the stage musical The Wiz when it debuted in Baltimore, Maryland, in 1974. She played the Queen of the Field Mice, a character from the original L. Frank Baum novel The Wonderful Wizard of Oz. However, when the show was revised prior to going to Broadway, McQueen's role was cut.

Offers for acting roles began to dry up around this time, and she devoted herself to other pursuits including political study. She received a bachelor's degree in political science from City College of New York in 1975, aged 64. McQueen played the character of Aunt Thelma, a fairy godmother, in the ABC Weekend Special episode "The Seven Wishes of Joanna Peabody" (1978) and the ABC Afterschool Special episode "Seven Wishes of a Rich Kid" (1979); her performance in the latter earned her a Daytime Emmy Award for Outstanding Individual Achievement in Children's Programming.

Her final feature film role was in The Mosquito Coast (1986). Her final appearance was in the TV movie Polly, a reimagining of the Pollyanna story with a black cast.

== Personal life ==
McQueen neither married nor had children. She lived in New York in the summer months and in Augusta, Georgia, during the winter.

McQueen once resided in the Thomas W. Phillips Residence in Los Angeles, a house that later became a filming location, most notably for the 1991 film The People Under the Stairs and the 2024-25 15th season of the show On Cinema.

In July 1983, a jury awarded McQueen $60,000 in a judgment stemming from a lawsuit that she had filed against two bus-terminal security guards. McQueen sued for harassment after she claimed that the security guards had accused her of being a pickpocket and a vagrant while she was at a Washington, D.C., Greyhound terminal in April 1979.

=== Atheism ===
In 1989, the Freedom From Religion Foundation honored McQueen with its Freethought Heroine Award. "I'm an atheist," she had declared, "and Christianity appears to me to be the most absurd imposture of all the religions, and I'm puzzled that so many people can't see through a religion that encourages irresponsibility and bigotry."

She told a reporter, "As my ancestors are free from slavery, I am free from the slavery of religion." This quote was used by the Freedom From Religion Foundation in advertisements inside Madison, Wisconsin, buses in 2009 and in an Atlanta market in 2010.

McQueen argued that if humans had focused on Earth and on people, rather than on mythology and on Jesus, there would be less hunger and homelessness. "They say the streets are going to be beautiful in Heaven. Well, I'm trying to make the streets beautiful here ... When it's clean and beautiful, I think America is heaven. And some people are hell."

== Death ==
McQueen died at age 84 on December 22, 1995, at Doctors Hospital in Augusta from burns sustained when a kerosene heater that she had attempted to light malfunctioned and burst into flames. McQueen donated her body to medical science and remembered the Freedom From Religion Foundation in her will.

== Filmography ==
| Year | Title | Role | Notes |
|---|---|---|---|
| 1939 | The Women | Lulu – Cosmetics Counter Maid | Uncredited |
| 1939 | Gone with the Wind | Prissy | |
| 1941 | Affectionately Yours | Butterfly | |
| 1943 | Cabin in the Sky | Lily | |
| 1943 | I Dood It | Annette | Alternative title: By Hook or by Crook |
| 1944 | Since You Went Away | WAC Sergeant | Uncredited, deleted scene |
| 1945 | Flame of Barbary Coast | Beulah – Flaxen's Maid | Alternative title: Flame of the Barbary Coast |
| 1945 | Mildred Pierce | Lottie – Mildred's Maid | Uncredited |
| 1946 | Duel in the Sun | Vashti | Alternative title: King Vidor's Duel in the Sun |
| 1948 | Killer Diller | Butterfly | |
| 1950 | Studio One | | Episode: "Give Us Our Dream" |
| 1950–1953 | Beulah | Oriole | 4 episodes |
| 1951 | Lux Video Theatre | Mary | Episode: "Weather for Today" |
| 1957 | Hallmark Hall of Fame | | Episode: "The Green Pastures" |
| 1970 | The Phynx | Herself | |
| 1974 | Amazing Grace | Clarine | |
| 1978 | ABC Weekend Special | Aunt Thelma | Episode: "The Seven Wishes of Joanna Peabody" |
| 1979 | ABC Afterschool Special | Aunt Thelma | Episode: "Seven Wishes of a Rich Kid" |
| 1986 | Adventures of Huckleberry Finn | Blind Negress | TV movie |
| 1986 | The Mosquito Coast | Ma Kennywick | |
| 1988 | The Making of a Legend: Gone with the Wind | Herself (Interview) | TV documentary |
| 1989 | Polly | Miss Priss | TV movie (final appearance) |
