= Marcella Rabwin =

American writer

Marcella Bannett Rabwin
- Born: May 15, 1908; Richmond, Virginia, US
- Died: December 25, 1998 (aged 90); New York City, US
- Occupation(s): Assistant, Author
- Spouse: Dr. Marcus Rabwin

Marcella Rabwin (born 15 May 1908, Richmond, Virginia – d. 25 December 1998, New York City) was a Hollywood figure and civic leader. She is most remembered as the executive assistant of David O. Selznick on the production of Gone with the Wind.

== Early life ==
Born to Elena (née Eskin) and Mayer Bannett (Great Uncle of David Bannett). Raised in Virginia, Marcella Rabwin left for Los Angeles at 16, attended UCLA, and gained employment as a custom dressmaker in Bullock's department store after graduating.

== Career ==
Her first contact with the motion picture industry was with Warner Brothers Studios' costume department, where she worked before becoming a secretary for executive Arthur Caesar. She also worked briefly for Darryl F. Zanuck. She next began to work for agent Myron Selznick, but left for RKO Radio Pictures.

Three months after moving to RKO, the studios were bought by Myron's brother, David, who quickly promoted her from his secretary to his Executive Assistant. She married her husband, Dr. Marcus Rabwin, who had been a second year medical student at the University of Minnesota when he convinced Judy Garland’s parents Frank and Ethel Gumm to let the Ethel’s pregnancy go full term. Garland’s father had consulted Rabwin, a close family friend, about the possibility of abortion. Marcella Rabwin was David O. Selznick's executive assistant in the late 1930s and early 1940s. Notably, she was his assistant during the production of Gone With the Wind. Her employment under David O. Selznick ended in 1941.

Until her death, she remained close friends with many celebrities of Hollywood's heyday and took part in various community efforts. Rabwin became a civic leader in Beverly Hills, spearheading the campaign to build that city's library. Her only book Yes, Mr. Selznick was published a year after her death.

== Filmography ==
- Nothing Sacred (1937) (executive assistant: Mr. Selznick) (uncredited)
- Rebecca (1940) (executive assistant to producer) (uncredited)
- The Making of a Legend: Gone with the Wind (1988) (TV) .... as Herself - Executive Assistant to David O. Selznick
- Biography .... - Judy Garland: Beyond the Rainbow (1997).... Herself (1 episode, 1997)
- American Masters .... - Hitchcock, Selznick and the End of Hollywood (1998).... Herself (1 episode, 1998)
- Reputations: Alfred Hitchcock (1999) (TV) .... Herself
- E! True Hollywood Story .... - Last Days of Judy Garland (2001) TV episode .... Herself (1 episode, 2001)
