= Frances Lear =

American magazine publisher, writer, and feminist (1923–1996)

- Born: Evelyn Loeb; July 14, 1923; Hudson, New York, U.S.
- Died: September 30, 1996 (aged 73); New York City, New York, U.S.
- Occupations: Activist, publisher, editor, writer
- Known for: Lear's
- Spouses: Arnold P. Weiss (divorced) Morton Kaufmann (divorced) Norman Lear (m. 1956; div. 1985)
- Children: 2

Frances Lear (née Loeb, July 14, 1923 – September 30, 1996) was an American activist, magazine publisher, editor and writer.

== Biography ==
Lear was born with only a first name, Evelyn, to an unwed mother in Hudson, New York, at the Vanderheusen Home for Wayward Girls. After being placed in a Jewish orphanage, she was adopted at 14 months by Aline and Herbert Loeb from Larchmont, New York, who changed her name from Evelyn to Frances. Her adoptive mother was of German Jewish ancestry. When she was 10 years old, her adoptive father committed suicide after losing his business in the Depression. Her mother remarried and when Frances was 12, her stepfather began molesting her, according to her autobiography. She attended the Mary A. Burnham School for Girls in Northampton, Massachusetts.

In her youth, Frances captained a basketball team and also edited her high school yearbook.

She originally made her career as a buyer for women's sportswear at Lord & Taylor. She was married and divorced twice at a young age, first to Arnold Peter Weiss, who served as traffic manager at the Navy Yard in Charleston, South Carolina, and secondly to Morton Kaufman (or Kaufmann). In 1956, she married television producer Norman Lear in Las Vegas. At age 50, she was diagnosed with bipolar disorder. She became an activist for the women's movement, civil rights and mental health.

During the 1968 Democratic Presidential Primaries, she worked on Minnesota U.S. Senator Eugene McCarthy's campaign for President. She later worked with the National Organization for Women on behalf of the Equal Rights Amendment.

In 1985, she divorced Lear after 28 years of marriage. The divorce settlement, estimated to be between $100 million to $112 million (equivalent to $335,272,277 in 2025), was one of the largest on record. She used $25 million of the settlement to start Lear's, a magazine targeting women over 45. She was Advertising Age Editor of the Year in 1989. The magazine folded six years later.

She is acknowledged to be the inspiration for the character Maude Findlay on the sitcom Maude. Norman Lear gave some support to this suggestion, including in his 1998 Emmy Legends interview.

Frances Lear published an autobiography in 1992, The Second Seduction, and at the time of her death had written another book, Frances Lear's Guide to Work and Family in the 21st Century.

She had two daughters, Kate (b. 1957) and Maggie (b. 1959), with Norman Lear. She died of breast cancer at age 73.
