= The Making of a Legend: Gone with the Wind =

- Directed by: David Hinton
- Written by: David Thomson
- Produced by: L. Jeffrey Selznick
- Narrated by: Christopher Plummer
- Cinematography: Glenn Roland
- Edited by: Bobby Jones
- Music by: Greg Crawford
- Production company: Daniel Selznick Properties
- Distributed by: TNT; MGM/UA Home Entertainment
- Release date: October 5, 1988
- Running time: 124 minutes
- Country: United States
- Language: English

The Making of a Legend: Gone with the Wind is a 1988 American documentary film by David Hinton, that outlines the successes and challenges of the casting, filming and legacy of the commercially and critically acclaimed 1939 film Gone with the Wind, from concept to finished product.

The project focuses on producer David O. Selznick, from the time of the novel's 1936 publication to the Academy Awards ceremony of 1940. Included are interviews with many of the crew and office personnel involved in production. O. Selznick struggled to control his project, working with three directors along the way--George Cukor, Victor Fleming and Sam Wood. Each had their own vision and the strong-willed men often clashed.

The Making of a Legend brings up many of the "what ifs?" that arose as different scenarios were discussed. Among these were the possibilities of Errol Flynn and Gary Cooper as Rhett Butler.

== Cast ==
- Christopher Plummer ... Narrator (voice)
- L. Jeffrey Selznick ... David O. Selznick (voice)
- Arthur E. Arling ... Himself - Camera Operator (as Arthur Arling)
- Katherine Brown ... Herself - Eastern Story Editor for David O. Selznick (as Kay Brown Barrett)
- Arthur Fellows ... Himself - Assistant to George Cukor
- Raymond A. Klune ... Himself - Production Manager in Gone with the Wind (as Ray Klune)
- Silvia Shulman Lardner ... Herself - Secretary to David O. Selznick
- James E. Newcom ... Himself - Associate Film Editor in Gone with the Wind (as James Newcom)
- Marcella Rabwin ... Herself - Executive Assistant to David O. Selznick
- Harry L. Wolf ... Himself - Assistant Cameraman in Gone with the Wind (as Harry Wolf)
- Evelyn Keyes ... Herself - Actress in Gone with the Wind
- Butterfly McQueen ... Herself - Actress in Gone with the Wind
- Ann Rutherford ... Herself - Actress in Gone with the Wind
- Sunny Lash ... Herself - Secretary and Friend to Vivien Leigh
- William Erickson ... Himself - Preview Audience Member
- Johnny Albright ... Himself - Extra in Gone with the Wind
- Philip Roth ... Himself
- Julie Landau ... Herself

== See also ==
- Gone with the Wind, 1936 novel by Margaret Mitchell
