= Polly (film) =

- Genre: Adventure; Biography; Drama
- Based on: Pollyanna by Eleanor H. Porter
- Teleplay by: W. F. Blinn
- Directed by: Debbie Allen
- Starring: Keshia Knight Pulliam; Phylicia Rashad
- Theme music composer: Joel McNeely
- Country of origin: United States
- Original language: English

Production
- Executive producer: William Blinn
- Producer: Frank Fischer
- Production location: Pasadena, California
- Cinematography: Isidore Mankofsky
- Editor: Jim McElroy
- Running time: 100 minutes
- Production companies: Echo Cove Productions; Walt Disney Television

Original release
- Network: NBC
- Release: November 12, 1989

Related
- Polly: Comin' Home!

Polly is a 1989 American made-for-television musical film adapted from the book Pollyanna by Eleanor H. Porter featuring an all African-American cast (with the exception of Celeste Holm). It was directed and choreographed by Debbie Allen, starring Keshia Knight Pulliam, Phylicia Rashad and also featured the final performance of actress Butterfly McQueen. Polly was originally broadcast on NBC on November 12, 1989.

== Plot ==
Set in Alabama during the 1950s, Polly Whittier, an orphan who is sent to live with her aunt Polly Harrington, who is a descendant of the founding family of a small Southern town (also called Harrington) during the segregation era. A key point in dividing the town is a ravine which has an unrepaired bridge which burned down many years ago, and no one knows how it started and is suspicious of everyone else. Polly is able to convince people to look at the bright side of things, but tragedy strikes when Polly falls two stories from a tree, suffering a spinal injury.

Polly proved to be a ratings hit and a sequel, Polly: Comin' Home!, followed in 1990. Both of these films are available on DVD exclusively from the Disney Movie Club and Disney Movie Rewards.

== Cast ==
- Keshia Knight Pulliam as Polly Whittier
- Phylicia Rashad as Aunt Polly Harrington
- Dorian Harewood as Dr. Robert Shannon
- Barbara Montgomery as Mrs. Conley
- T. K. Carter as George Dodds
- Vanessa Bell Calloway as Nancy Palmer
- Brandon Quintin Adams as Jimmy Bean
- Butterfly McQueen as Miss Priss
- Larry Riley as Reverend Gillis
- Brock Peters as Mr. Pendergast
- Celeste Holm as Miss Snow
- Ken Page as Mayor Warren

== Musical numbers ==
1. Overture
2. By Your Side- Polly
3. Honey Ain't Got Nothin' On You- Polly, Nancy, & Girls
4. Sweet Little Angel Eyes- Jimmy Bean, Polly, George, Nancy, & Kids
5. Something More- Ms. Harrington
6. Shine A Light- Robert, George, & Mayor Warren
7. Rainbow Maker- Polly, Ms. Harrington, & Nancy
8. Stand Up- Rev. Gillis, Robert, Polly, Nancy, Jimmy Bean, George, & Ensemble
9. Finale- Ensemble

== Soundtrack ==
Polly

Soundtrack album
- Released: November 30, 1989
- Length: 31:06
- Label: Walt Disney Records

The original television soundtrack recording of Polly was released on CD and cassette tape by Walt Disney Records on November 30, 1989.

Track listing

1. "Overture" (2:36)
2. "By Your Side" – Polly (2:30)
3. "Honey Ain't Got Nothin' On You" – Polly, Nancy & Girls (2:07)
4. "Sweet Little Angel Eyes" – Jimmy Bean, Polly, George, Nancy & Children (2:17)
5. "Shine A Light" – Mayor Warren, Dr. Shannon & George (2:35)
6. "Something More" – Aunt Polly (2:24)
7. "Rainbow Theme" (0:35)
8. "Rainbow Maker" – Polly, Nancy & Aunt Polly (2:00)
9. "Delivering Baskets" (0:54)
10. "Stand Up" – Reverend Gillis, Dr. Shannon & Congregation (4:28)
11. "At the Bazaar" (1:40)
12. "Swingin' Sisters" (2:10)
13. "A Prayer/Polly's Day" (2:00)
14. "Finale" (2:50)

== Home media ==
Both Polly and Polly: Comin' Home were released on VHS by Walt Disney Home Video in 1990. Around 2000 the two movies were released on DVD on Disney Movie Club Exclusive.

== Reception ==
Patricia Brennan of The Washington Post wrote that while the film "may be a little too sweet for everyone's taste", it features "some of the best original song-and-dance numbers to come to television in years." Howard Rosenberg of Los Angeles Times called it the "worst kind of fairy tale, one that doesn’t seem to know it’s a fairy tale" and wrote that Pulliam's performance is "so gratingly precious and saccharine that she makes Shirley Temple seem like Lucretia Borgia."

== Award nominations ==
Year	Award	Result	Category	Recipient
1990	Emmy Award	Nominated	Outstanding Cinematography for a Miniseries or a Special	Isidore Mankofsky
1990	Emmy Award	Nominated	Outstanding Achievement in Choreography	Debbie Allen
1990	Young Artist Awards	Nominated	Best Young Actress Starring in a TV Movie, Pilot or Special	Keshia Knight Pulliam
1990	Young Artist Awards	Nominated	Best Young Actor Starring in a TV Movie, Pilot or Special	Brandon Adams
