= Isidore Mankofsky =

American cinematographer (1931–2021)

- Born: September 22, 1931; New York City, New York
- Died: March 11, 2021 (aged 89); Los Angeles, California
- Education: Brooks Institute
- Occupation: Cinematographer
- Years active: 1967–2007
- Spouse: Christine Mankofsky 1972
- Awards: American Society of Cinematographers Presidents Award 2009

Isidore Mankofsky (September 22, 1931 – March 11, 2021) was an American cinematographer, and was nominated for two Emmys. He is best known for his work on films such as The Muppet Movie (1979) and The Jazz Singer (1980). He shot more than 200 educational movies for Encyclopædia Britannica.

He died at his home in Los Angeles, California in March 2021 at the age of 89.

== Selected filmography ==
- 1970: A.k.a. Cassius Clay
- 1971: Werewolves on Wheels
- 1973: Scream Blacula Scream
- 1974: The Ultimate Thrill
- 1977: Lanigan's Rabbi
- 1979: The Muppet Movie
- 1980: Somewhere in Time
- 1980: The Jazz Singer
- 1982: In the Custody of Strangers
- 1983: Baby Sister
- 1983: Quarterback Princess
- 1984: Silence of the Heart
- 1984: The Burning Bed
- 1985: Better off Dead
- 1985: Ewoks: The Battle for Endor
- 1986: One Crazy Summer
- 1988: A Very Brady Christmas
- 1988: Clinton and Nadine
- 1989: Parent Trap III
- 1989: Polly
- 1989: Skin Deep
- 1991: Love, Lies and Murder
- 1992: Afterburn
- 1992: Day-O
- 1992: Bed of Lies
- 1994: Father and Scout
- 1994: The Gift of Love
- 1995: Out-of-Sync
- 1995: The Heidi Chronicles
- 1996: She Cried No

== Literature ==
- Zone, Ray: Isidore Mankofsky in 3-D filmmakers: Conversations with creators of stereoscopic motion pictures, 2005, p. 61-70.
- Alexander, Geoff & Prelinger, Rick: Isidore Mankofsky in Academic Films for the Classroom: A History, Mcfarland & Co Inc., 2010, p. 172-173.
- Fauer, John: Cinematographer Style - The Complete Interviews, Vol. II, American Cinematographer, 2009
