= Scott McKay (actor) =

American film, television and theatre actor (1915–1987)

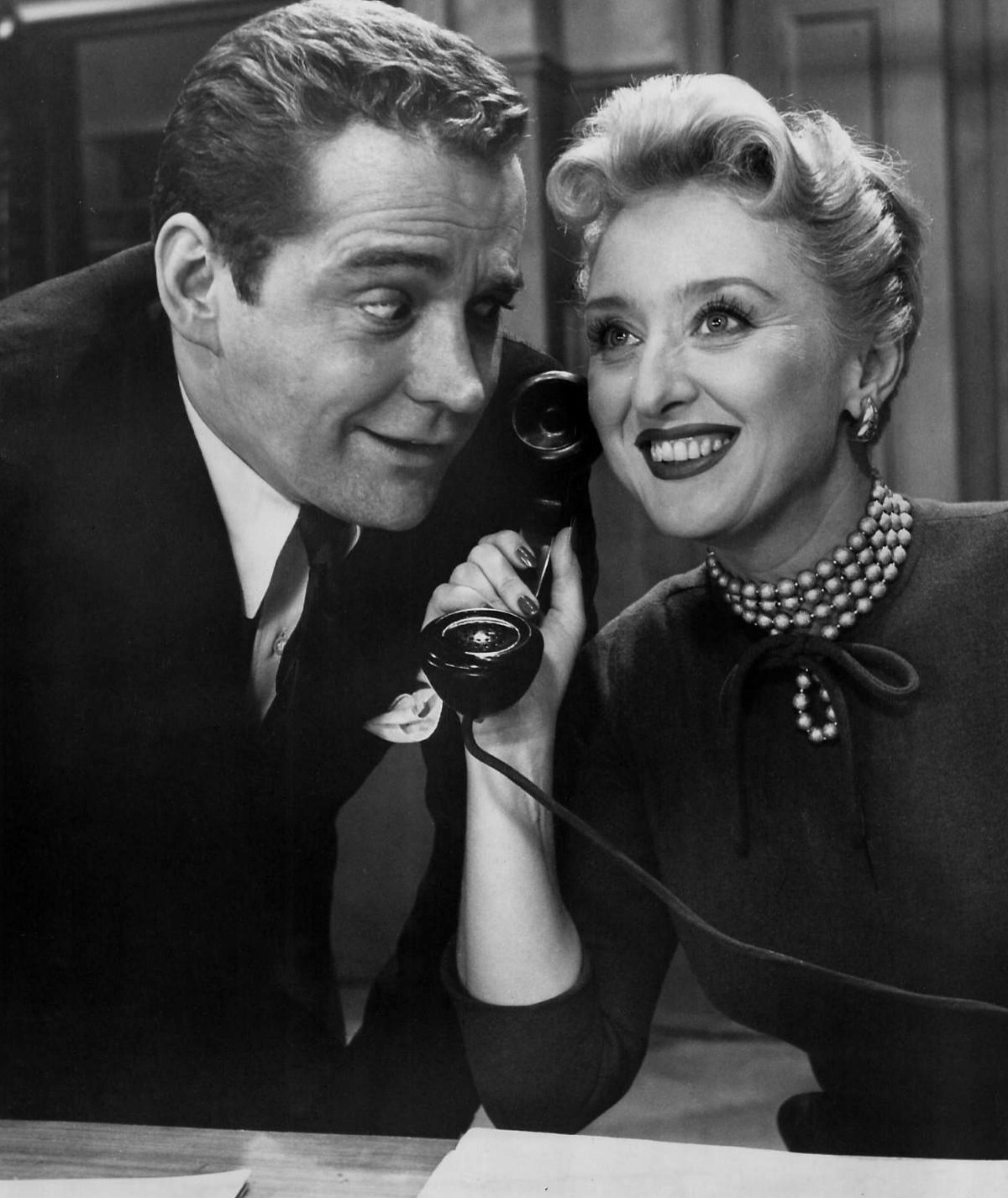
- McKay (left) with Celeste Holm in Honestly, Celeste!, 1954
- Born: Carl Gose; May 28, 1915; Pleasantville, Iowa, U.S.
- Died: March 16, 1987 (aged 71); New York, U.S.
- Education: University of Colorado
- Occupations: Film, television and theatre actor
- Spouses: Margaret Spickers (m. 1942; div. 1950) Joan Morgan (m. 1951; died 1962) Ann Sheridan (m. 1966; died 1967) Anne-Marie McKay (m. 1969)
- Children: 2

Scott McKay (born Carl Gose; May 28, 1915 – March 16, 1987) was an American film, television, and theatre actor.

== Life and career ==
Carl Gose was born in Pleasantville, Iowa. He attended the University of Colorado, studying English literature. After graduating, he had ambitions of becoming a professor of English, but decided to pursue a career as an actor after an appearance in a Little Theatre production. His first work in theatre was as a straight man for a magician. He performed in Broadway plays from 1939 onwards, first appearing in the cast of The American Way, credited as Carl Gose. He played Captain Fisby in The Teahouse of the August Moon, replacing John Forsythe. McKay also played David Larabee in Sabrina Fair and Jeff Douglas in a 1967 production of Brigadoon. His final theatre credit was in 1974, as Ronald in Absurd Person Singular.

McKay began his screen career in 1944, playing Dr. Dan Proctor in the film Guest in the House and starring as Captain David M. Jones in the film Thirty Seconds Over Tokyo. McKay played Private Jimmy Earhart in the 1945 film Kiss and Tell. He also played Sid in the 1946 film Duel in the Sun. In 1954, he starred with Celeste Holm in the CBS situation comedy television series Honestly, Celeste! as Bob Wallace. He played Mr. Gilling in the 1979 film The Bell Jar, and his final film credit was for the 1980 film Christmas Evil, playing Mr. Fletcher.

== Death ==
McKay died on March 16, 1987 of kidney failure at the Cabrini Medical Center in New York, at the age of 71.

== Selected filmography ==
- Alfred Hitchcock Presents (1958) (Season 3 Episode 21: "Guest for Breakfast") as Jordan Ross
- Alfred Hitchcock Presents (1961) (Season 6 Episode 24: "A Woman's Help") as Arnold Burton
