= Ed Simmons (screenwriter) =

American producer and screenwriter (1919–1998)

- Born: Everett Louis Simmons; June 18, 1919; Boston, Massachusetts, U.S.
- Died: May 18, 1998 (aged 78); Los Angeles, California, U.S.
- Occupations: Producer, screenwriter
- Spouse: Sylvia Lewis (m. 1966; div. 1972)
- Children: 2

Ed Simmons (June 18, 1919 – May 18, 1998) was an American producer and screenwriter. In his early career, he partnered with Norman Lear, writing for Martin and Lewis on The Colgate Comedy Hour. He won five Primetime Emmy Awards and was nominated for eight more in the categories Outstanding Writing and Outstanding Variety Series for his work on the television programs The Red Skelton Show and The Carol Burnett Show.

Simmons died on May 18, 1998, of a cardiac arrest at the Cedars-Sinai Medical Center in Los Angeles, California, at the age of 78.
