= Lear's =

American women's magazine (1988–1994)

- May 1991 issue of Lear's featuring Susan Sarandon
- Categories: Women's magazine
- Frequency: Monthly
- Founder: Frances Lear
- Founded: 1988
- Final issue: 1994
- Country: United States
- Based in: New York City
- Language: English

Lear's was a monthly women's magazine, intended for women over 45. It covered celebrity interviews, women's issues, and many progressive issues. Its slogan was "For The Woman Who Wasn't Born Yesterday". It was published from 1988 until early 1994. The magazine was based in New York City.

== History ==
Lear's was founded by Frances Lear, and was designed for readers similar to herself. Having received a divorce settlement reported at $100 million, Lear could afford to run the magazine the way she wished. The first issue appeared on February 23, 1988.

Lear's was published on a monthly basis. Because the magazine carried very little fashion coverage, it did not have a natural advertising base, and potential advertisers had difficulty identifying exactly who the readers were. Lear's circulation was audited at 503,000 when it closed, with a median age of 45.3.

It was no industry secret that Sheldon Schorr was brought in to wind down the operation. Schorr stated at an industry conference, "Lear's could have been successful if Ms. Lear provided a better marketing and advertising opportunity to the 35–54 women of America." He claimed that "the staff was bloated and Lear wasted more than a hundred thousand dollars every month." He then took less than thirty days to shut the publication down. Although there were publishers interested in taking over, Lear would not permit Schorr to make a deal because her name on cover made her "eternally vested".

When Lear's closed in 1994, the executive director Evelyn Renold said "A lot of us feel that we have done our very best work at this magazine. We put out a smart, stylish magazine for grown-up women, and I feel there is nothing quite like it out there now."
