= Top-rated United States television programs of 1976–77 =

This table displays the top-rated primetime television series of the 1976–77 season as measured by Nielsen Media Research.

Rank	Program	Network	Rating
1	Happy Days	ABC	31.5
2	Laverne & Shirley	ABC	30.9
3	ABC Monday Night Movie	ABC	26.0
4	M*A*S*H	CBS	25.9
5	Charlie's Angels	ABC	25.8
6	The Big Event	NBC	24.4
7	The Six Million Dollar Man	ABC	24.2
8	ABC Sunday Night Movie	ABC	23.4
8	Baretta	ABC	23.4
8	One Day at a Time	CBS	23.4
11	Three's Company	ABC	23.1
12	All in the Family	CBS	22.9
13	Welcome Back, Kotter	ABC	22.7
14	The Bionic Woman	ABC	22.4
15	The Waltons	CBS	22.3
15	Little House on the Prairie	NBC	22.3
17	Barney Miller	ABC	22.2
18	60 Minutes	CBS	21.9
18	Hawaii Five-O	CBS	21.9
20	NBC Monday Night Movie	NBC	21.8
21	Rich Man, Poor Man Book II	ABC	21.6
22	Monday Night Football	ABC	21.2
23	Eight Is Enough	ABC	21.1
24	The Jeffersons	CBS	21.0
25	What's Happening!!	ABC	20.9
26	Good Times	CBS	20.5
27	Sanford and Son	NBC	20.3
28	ABC Friday Night Movie	ABC	20.2
29	The Tony Randall Show	ABC	20.1
30	Alice	CBS	20.0
