= Celeste Holm =

American stage, film and television actress (1917–2012)

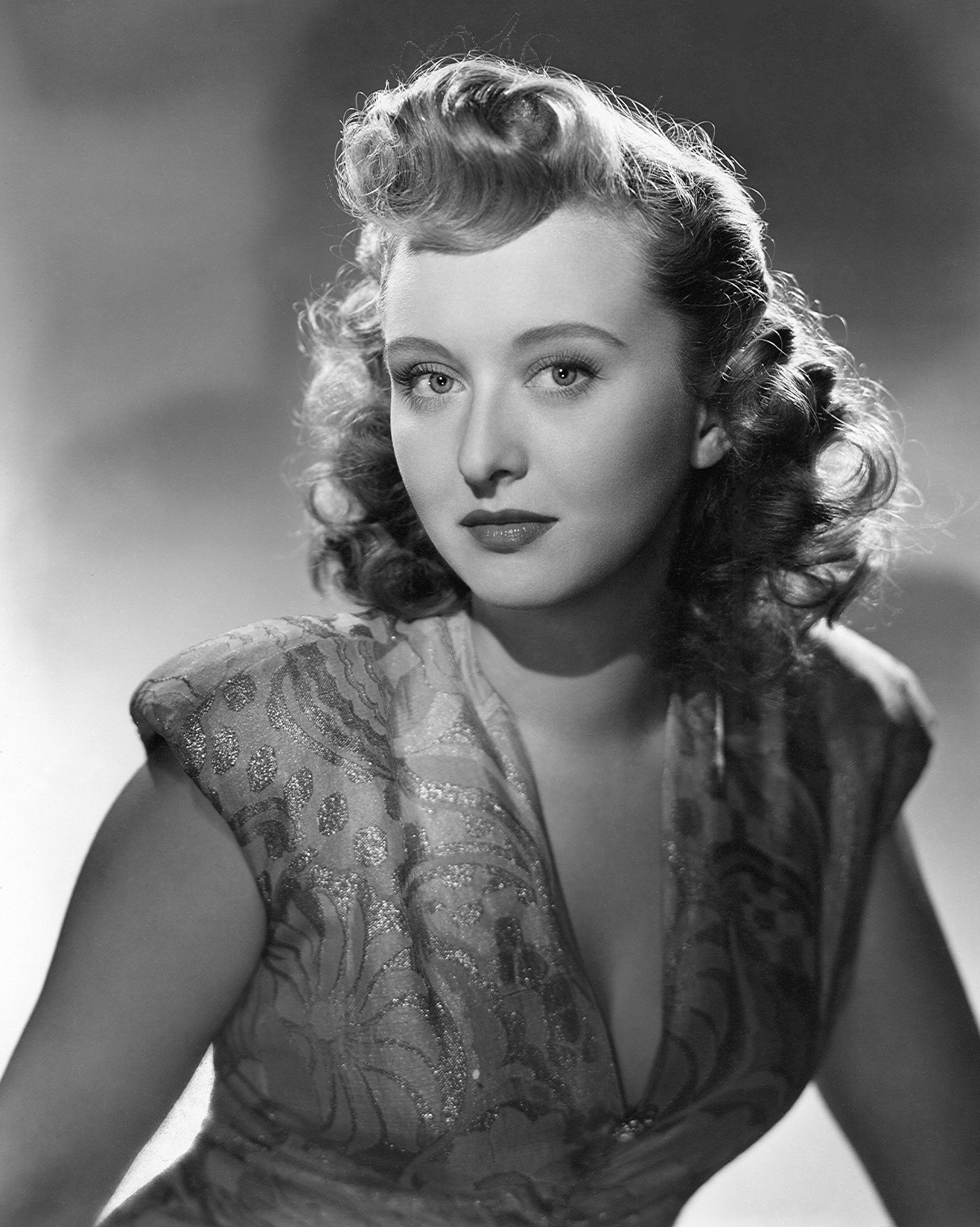
- Holm in 1947
- Born: April 29, 1917; New York City, U.S.
- Died: July 15, 2012 (aged 95); New York City, U.S.
- Education: University of Chicago
- Occupations: Actress; singer
- Years active: 1937–2004
- Spouses: Ralph Nelson (m. 1936; div. 1939) Francis Davies (m. 1940; div. 1945) A. Schuyler Dunning (m. 1946; div. 1953) Wesley Addy (m. 1961; died 1996) Frank Basile (m. 2004)
- Children: 2, including Ted Nelson
- Awards: Academy Award for Best Supporting Actress; Hollywood Walk of Fame

Celeste Holm (April 29, 1917 – July 15, 2012) was an American actress. Holm won an Academy Award for her performance in Elia Kazan's Gentleman's Agreement (1947), and was nominated for her roles in Come to the Stable (1949) and All About Eve (1950). She also is known for her performances in The Snake Pit (1948), A Letter to Three Wives (1949), The Tender Trap (1955), and High Society (1956) as well as for originating the role of Ado Annie in the Rodgers and Hammerstein musical Oklahoma! (1943).

== Early life ==
Born and raised in Manhattan, Holm was an only child. Her mother, Jean Parke, was an American portrait artist and author. Her father, Theodor Holm, was a Norwegian businessman whose company provided marine adjustment services for Lloyd's of London. Because of her parents' occupations, she traveled often during her youth and attended various schools in the Netherlands, France and the United States. She began high school at the University School for Girls in Chicago, and then transferred to the Francis W. Parker School (Chicago) where she performed in many school stage productions and graduated as a member of the class of 1935. She then studied drama at the University of Chicago before becoming a stage actress in the late 1930s.

== Career ==
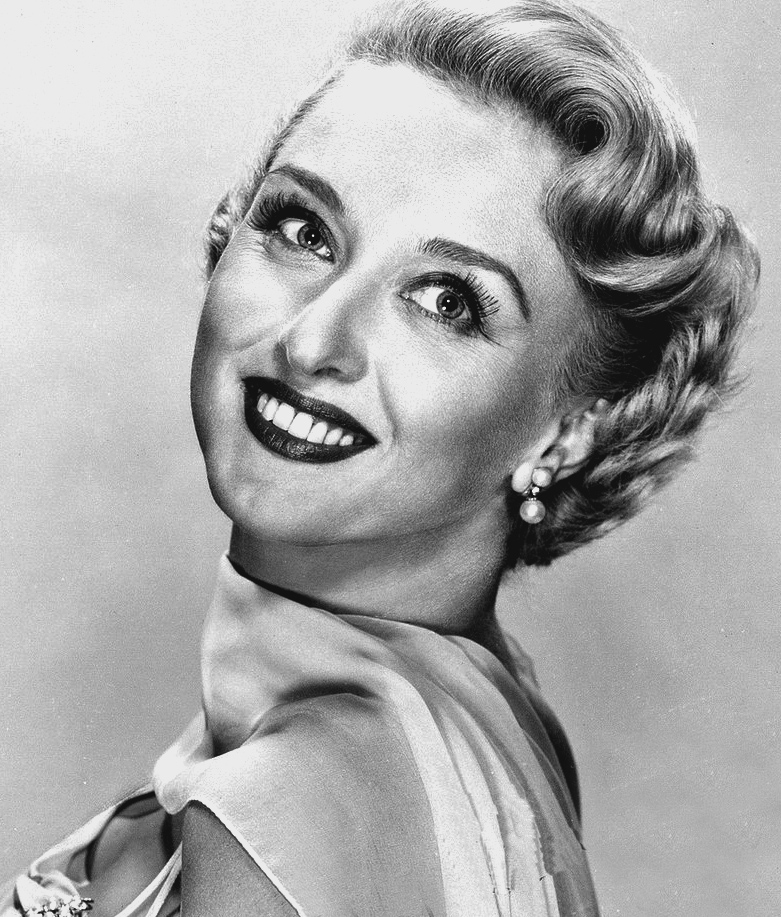
Celeste Holm in 1955

Holm's first professional theatrical role was in a production of Hamlet starring Leslie Howard. She first appeared on Broadway in a small part in Gloriana (1938), a comedy which lasted for only five performances, but her first major part on Broadway was in William Saroyan's revival of The Time of Your Life (1940) as Mary L. with fellow newcomer Gene Kelly. The role that got her the most recognition from critics and audiences was as Ado Annie in the premiere production of Rodgers and Hammerstein's Oklahoma! in 1943.

After she starred in the Broadway production of Bloomer Girl, 20th Century Fox signed Holm to a movie contract in 1946. She made her film debut that same year in Three Little Girls in Blue, making a startling entrance in a "Technicolor red" dress singing "Always a Lady", a belting Ado Annie-type song, although the character was different—a lady. For her role in Gentleman's Agreement (1947), she won an Oscar and Golden Globe for Best Supporting Actress. However, after another supporting role in All About Eve, Holm realized she preferred live theater to movie work, and only accepted a few select film roles over the next decade. The most successful of these were the comedy The Tender Trap (1955) and the musical High Society (1956), both of which co-starred Frank Sinatra. She starred as a professor-turned-reporter in New York City in the CBS television series Honestly, Celeste! (fall 1954) and was thereafter a panelist on Who Pays? (1959). She also appeared ABC's The Pat Boone Chevy Showroom.

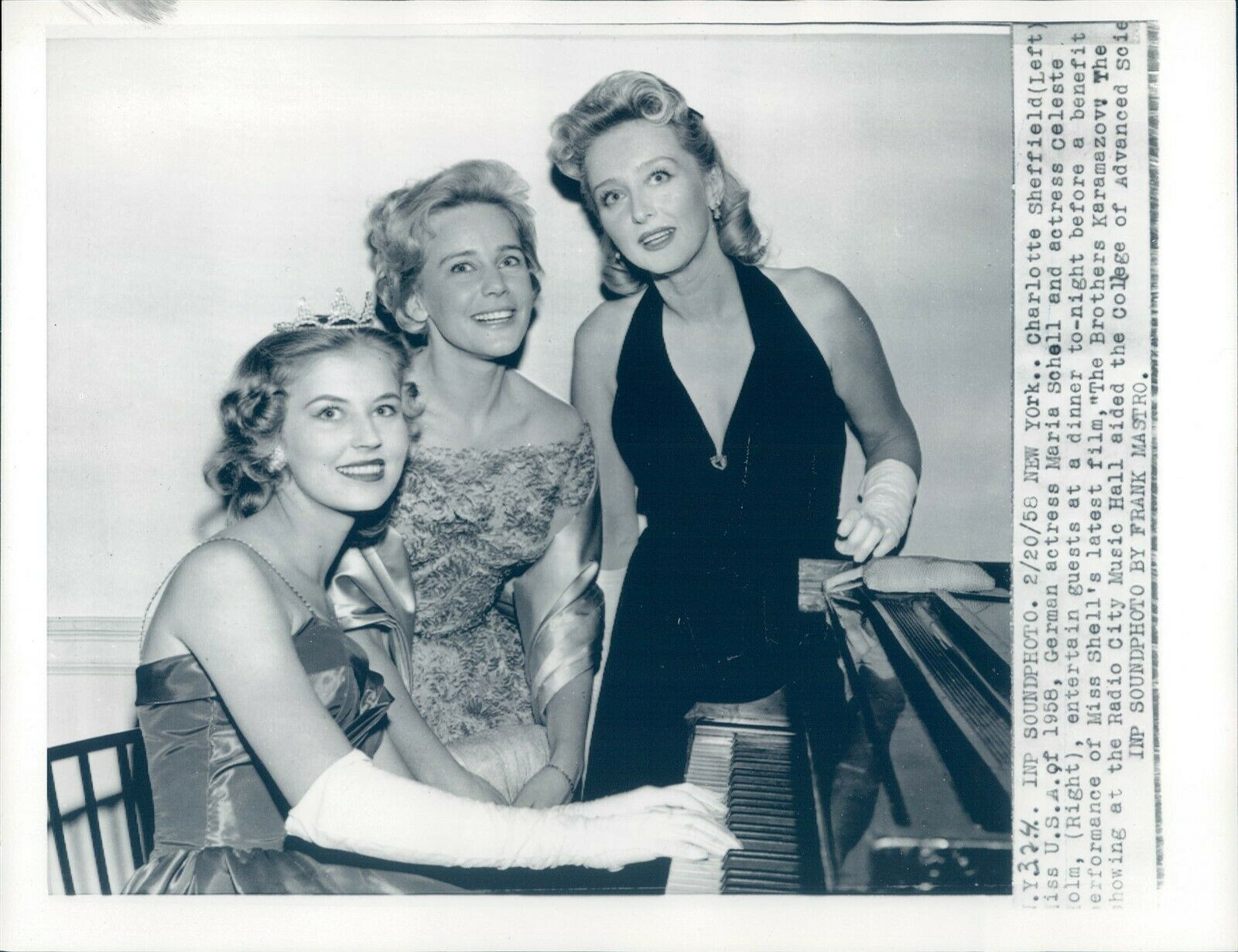
Charlotte Sheffield, Maria Schell, and Celeste Holm entertain guests at a dinner to-night, 1958

In 1958, she starred as a reporter in an unsold television pilot called The Celeste Holm Show, based on the book No Facilities for Women. In 1965, she played the Fairy Godmother alongside Lesley Ann Warren in the CBS production of Cinderella. In 1970–71, she was featured on the NBC sitcom Nancy.

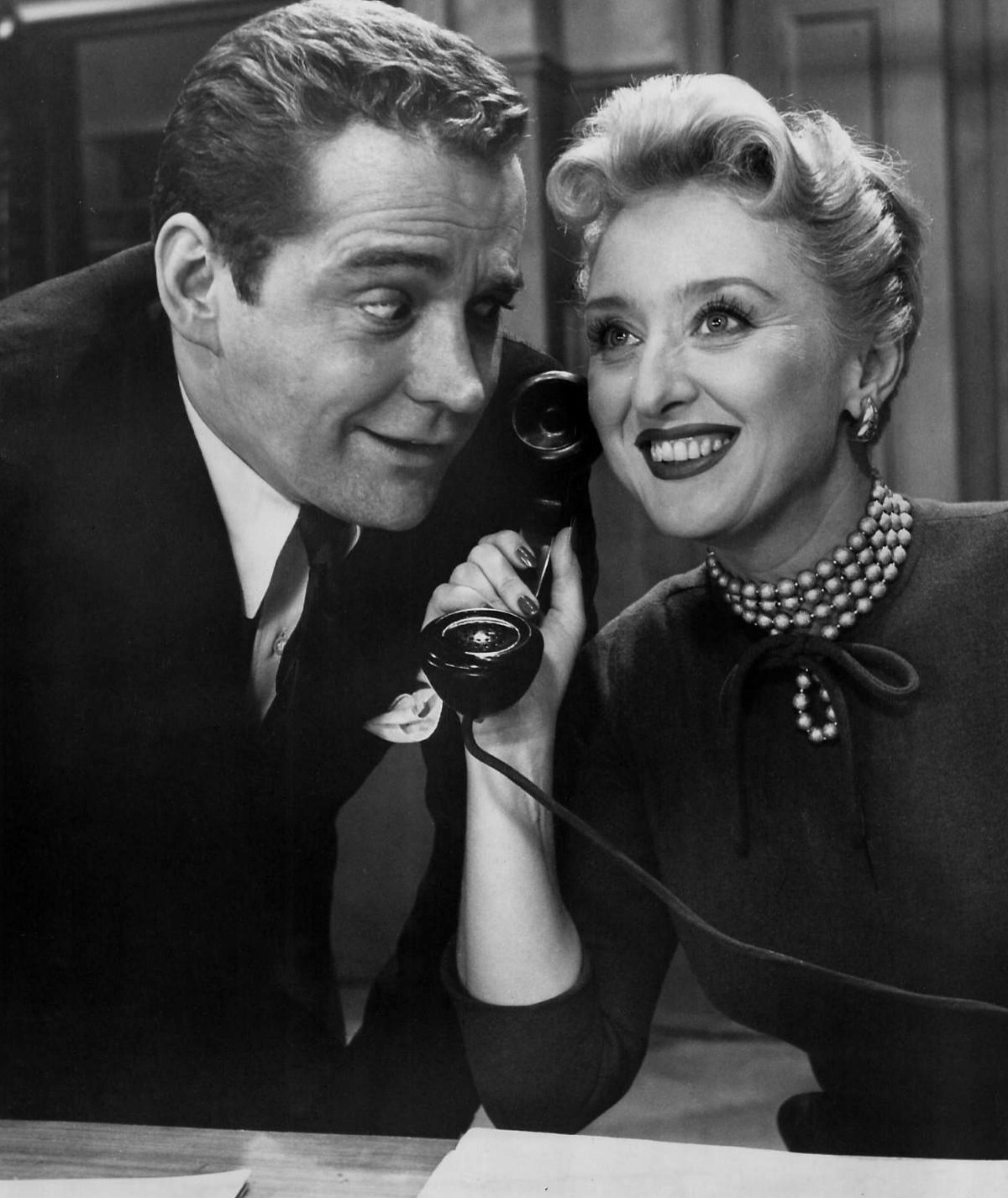
Holm with Scott McKay

During the 1970s and 1980s, Holm did more screen acting, with roles in films such as Tom Sawyer and Three Men and a Baby, and in television series (often as a guest star) such as Columbo, The Eleventh Hour, Archie Bunker's Place and Falcon Crest. In 1979, she played the role of First Lady Florence Harding in the television mini-series, Backstairs at the White House. Holm also starred in the musical The Utter Glory of Morrissey Hall, which flopped after a single performance (and seven previews) on Broadway. In December 1981 Holm appeared in the lead role in the British premiere of Kurt Weill's Lady in the Dark at the Nottingham Playhouse. She was a regular on the ABC soap opera Loving, appearing first in 1986 in the role of Lydia Woodhouse and again as Isabelle Dwyer Alden #2 from 1991 to 1992. She last appeared on television in the CBS television series Promised Land (1996–99).

== Honors ==
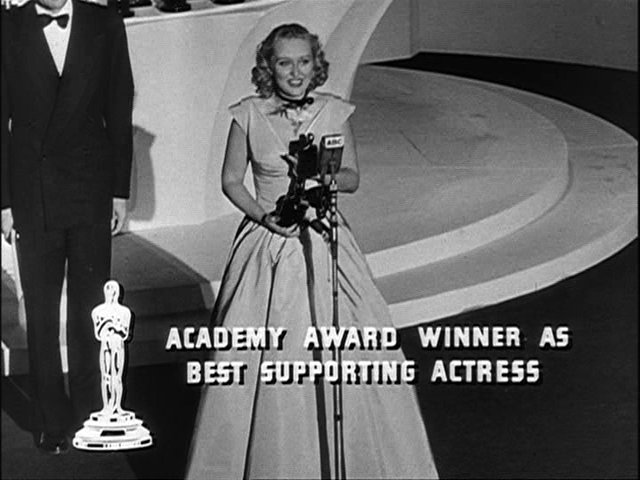
Accepting her Academy Award for Gentleman's Agreement (1947)

A life member of The Actors Studio, Holm received numerous honors during her lifetime, including the 1968 Sarah Siddons Award for distinguished achievement in Chicago theatre; she was appointed to the National Arts Council by then-President Ronald Reagan, appointed Knight, First Class of the Order of St. Olav by King Olav of Norway in 1979, and inducted into the American Theater Hall of Fame in 1992. She remained active for social causes as a spokesperson for UNICEF, and for occasional professional engagements. From 1995 she was Chairman of the Board of Arts Horizons, a not-for-profit arts-in-education organization. In 1995, Holm was inducted into the Scandinavian-American Hall of Fame.

In 2006, Holm was presented with a Lifetime Achievement Award by the SunDeis Film Festival at Brandeis University.

Holm was a guest at the 2009 Mid-Atlantic Nostalgia Convention in Aberdeen, Maryland. Some of the movies in which she appeared were screened at the festival, and the unaired television pilot for Meet Me in St. Louis was shown. She received an honorary award during the dinner banquet at the close of the event.

== Personal life ==
Holm's first marriage was at age 19 to Ralph Nelson in 1936. The marriage ended in 1939. Their son is Internet pioneer and sociologist Ted Nelson.

Holm married Francis Emerson Harding Davies, an English auditor, on January 7, 1940. Davies was a Roman Catholic, and she was received into the Roman Catholic Church for the purposes of their 1940 wedding; the marriage was dissolved on May 8, 1945.

From 1946 to 1952, Holm was married to airline public relations executive A. Schuyler Dunning, with whom she had a second son, businessman Daniel Dunning.

In 1961, Holm married actor Wesley Addy. The couple lived together on her family farm in Washington Township, Morris County, New Jersey. He died in 1996.

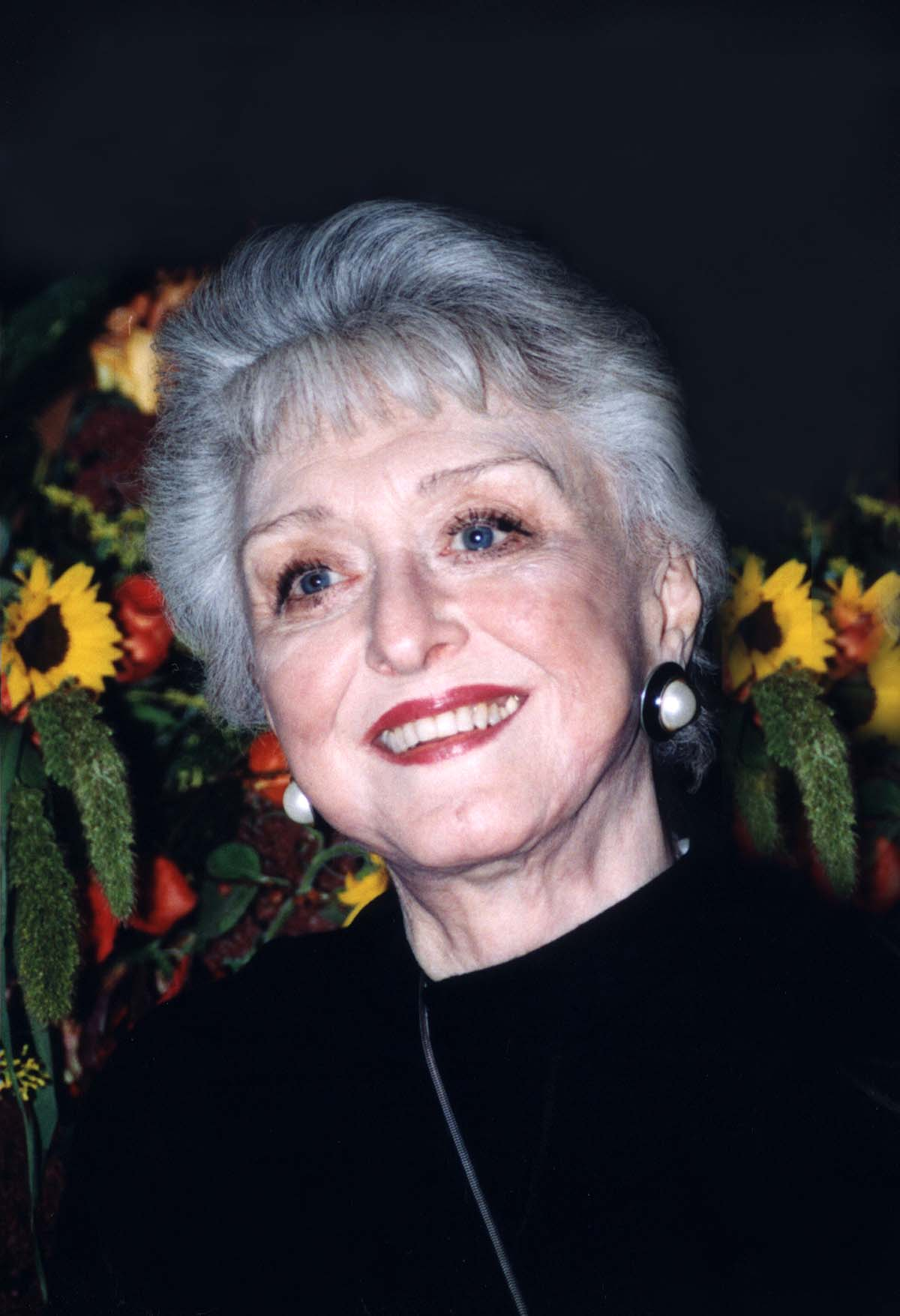
Holm in 1999

On April 29, 2004, her 87th birthday, Holm married opera singer Frank Basile, who was 41 years old. The couple had met in October 1999 at a fundraiser for which Basile had been hired to sing. Soon after their marriage, Holm and Basile sued to overturn the irrevocable trust that was created in 2002 by Daniel Dunning, Holm's younger son. The trust was ostensibly set up to shelter Holm's financial assets from taxes though Basile contended the real purpose of the trust was to keep him away from her money. The lawsuit began a five-year battle, which cost millions of dollars, and according to an article in The New York Times, left Holm and her husband with a "fragile hold" on their apartment, which Holm had purchased for $10,000 cash in 1953 from her film earnings, and which in 2011 was believed to be worth at least $10,000,000.

== Health and death ==
According to Frank Basile, Holm had been treated for memory loss since 2002, suffered skin cancer, bleeding ulcers and a collapsed lung, and had hip replacements and pacemakers.

In June 2012, Holm was admitted to New York's Roosevelt Hospital with dehydration, where she suffered a heart attack on July 13, 2012; she died two days later at her Central Park West apartment, aged 95.

== Work ==
=== Film ===
Year	Title	Role	Notes
1946	Three Little Girls in Blue	Miriam Harrington	
1947	Carnival in Costa Rica	Celeste	
1947	Gentleman's Agreement	Anne Dettrey	Oscar: Best Supporting Actress
1948	The Snake Pit	Grace	
1948	Road House	Susie Smith	
1949	Chicken Every Sunday	Emily Hefferan	
1949	A Letter to Three Wives	Addie Ross (voice)	Uncredited
1949	Come to the Stable	Sister Scholastica	
1949	Everybody Does It	Doris Blair Borland	
1950	Champagne for Caesar	Flame O'Neill	
1950	All About Eve	Karen Richards	
1955	The Tender Trap	Sylvia Crewes	
1956	High Society	Liz Imbrie	
1961	Bachelor Flat	Helen Bushmill	
1963	Hailstones and Halibut Bones	Narrator (voice)	Short film
1967	Doctor, You've Got to Be Kidding!	Louise Halloran	
1973	Tom Sawyer	Aunt Polly	
1976	Bittersweet Love	Marian Lewis	
1977	The Private Files of J. Edgar Hoover	Florence Hollister	
1987	Three Men and a Baby	Mrs. Holden	
1989	Nora's Christmas Gift	Nora Richards	Direct-to-video
1997	Still Breathing	Ida, Fletcher's grandmother	
2005	Alchemy	Iris	
2012	Driving Me Crazy: Proof of Concept	Mrs. Ginsberg	Short film
2015	College Debts	Grandma GG	Final film role

=== Television ===
Year	Title	Role	Notes
1950	All Star Revue	Guest Actress	Episode "1.6"
1951	Lux Video Theatre	Eliza; Margaret Best	Episode: "The Pacing Goose"; Episode: "Second Sight"
1952	Schlitz Playhouse	Lettie Morgan	Episode: "Four's a Family"
1952	Lux Video Theatre	Katherine Case	Episode: "The Bargain"
1953	Lux Video Theatre	Miss Prynne	Episode: "Lost Sunday"
1953	Hollywood Opening Night		Episode: "Mrs. Genius"
1953	Your Jeweler's Showcase		Episode: "Heart's Desire"
1954	Honestly, Celeste!	Celeste Anders	8 episodes
1955	The United States Steel Hour	Madge Collins	Episode: "The Bogey Man"
1956	Climax!	Mary Miller	Episode: "The Empty Room Blues"
1956	Sneak Preview	Carolyn Daniels	Episode: "Carolyn"
1956	The Steve Allen Show	Mad Meggie	Episode: "2.8"
1956	Producers' Showcase	Mad Meggie	Episode: "Jack and the Beanstalk"
1957	Schlitz Playhouse	Lettie Morgan	Episode: "The Wedding Present"
1957	Goodyear Playhouse	Maggie Travis	Episode: "The Princess Back Home"
1957	Zane Grey Theater	Sarah Kimball	Episode: "Fugitive"
1957	The Yeomen of the Guard	Phoebe Meryll	TV movie
1960	The Art Carney Special		Episode: "The Man in the Dog Suit"
1960	The Christophers		Episode: "Women of the Bible"
1961	Play of the Week	Virginia	Episode: "A Clearing in the Woods"
1962	Follow the Sun	Miss Bullfinch	Episode: "The Irresistible Miss Bullfinch"
1962	Checkmate	Laraine Whitman	Episode: "So Beats My Plastic Heart"
1962	Alcoa Premiere	Laura Bennett	Episode: "Cry Out in Silence"
1963	Dr. Kildare	Nurse Jane Munson	Episode: "The Pack Rat and Prima Donna"
1963	Burke's Law	Helen Forsythe	Episode: "Who Killed the Kind Doctor?"
1964	The Eleventh Hour	Billie Hamilton	Episode "How Do I Say I Love You?"
1965	Mr. Novak	Rose Herrod	Episode: "An Elephant Is Like a Tree"
1965	Cinderella	Fairy Godmother	TV movie
1965	Run for Your Life	Margot Horst	Episode: "The Cold, Cold War of Paul Bryan"
1965	Walt Disney's Wonderful World of Color	Mrs. Fuller	4 episodes
1965	The Fugitive	Flo Hagerman	Episode: "The Old Man Picked a Lemon"
1966	The Long Hot Summer	Libby Rankin	Episode: "Face of Fear"
1966	Meet Me in St. Louis	Mrs. Smith	TV movie
1967	The Fugitive	Pearl Patton	Episode: "Concrete Evidence"
1967	The F.B.I.	Flo Clementi	Episode: "The Executioners: Part 1"; Episode: "The Executioners: Part 2"
1967	Cosa Nostra, Arch Enemy of the FBI	Flo Clementi	TV movie
1967	Insight	Mrs. Berns	Episode: "Fat Hands and a Diamond Ring"
1970	The Name of the Game	Irene Comdon	Episode: "The Brass Ring"
1970	Swing Out, Sweet Land	Nancy Lincoln	TV movie
1970–71	Nancy	Abigail	17 episodes
1972	The Delphi Bureau	Sybil Van Loween	Episode: "Pilot"
1973	Medical Center	Dr. Linda Wilson	Episode: "No Margin for Error"
1974	Medical Center	Geraldine Stern	Episode: "Web of Intrigue"
1974	The Streets of San Francisco	Mrs. Shaninger	Episode: "Crossfire"
1974	The Underground Man	Beatrice Broadhurst	TV movie
1974	Death Cruise	Elizabeth Mason	Television Movie
1974	The Manhunter	Clara Calvert	Episode: "The Truck Murders"
1976	The American Woman: Portraits of Courage	Elizabeth Cady Stanton	TV movie
1976	Captains and the Kings	Sister Angela	TV miniseries
1976	Columbo	Mrs. Brandt	Episode: "Old Fashioned Murder"
1977	The Love Boat II	Eva McFarland	TV movie
1977	The Wonderful World of Disney	Deirdre Wainwright	Episode: "The Bluegrass Special"
1977	Wonder Woman	Dolly Tucker	Episode: "I Do, I Do"
1978	Lucan		Episode: "You Can't Have My Baby"
1978	Fantasy Island	Mabel Jarvis	Episode: "The Beachcomber/The Last Whodunnit"
1979	Fantasy Island	Sister Veronica	Episode: "The Look Alikes/Winemaker"
1979	Backstairs at the White House	Mrs. Florence Harding	TV miniseries
1979	Trapper John, M.D.	Claudia	Episode: "The Shattered Image"
1979	The Love Boat	Estelle Castlewood	2 episodes
1981	Midnight Lace	Sylvia Randall	TV movie
1981	As the World Turns	Lauren Roberts	TV series
1981–83	Archie Bunker's Place	Estelle Harris	5 episodes
1982	American Playhouse	Celebrity	Episode: "The Shady Hill Kidnapping"
1982	Trapper John, M.D.	Lillie Townsend	Episode: "Don't Rain on My Charade"
1983	This Girl for Hire	Zandra Stoneham	TV movie
1984	Jessie	Molly Hayden	6 episodes
1985	Matt Houston	Katherine Hershey	Episode: "Company Secrets"
1985	Falcon Crest	Anna Rossini	6 episodes
1987	Murder by the Book	Claire	TV movie
1987	Magnum, P.I.	Abigail Baldwin	Episode: "The Love That Lies"
1988	Spenser: For Hire	Rose	Episode: "Haunting"
1989	CBS Summer Playhouse	Samantha Orbison	Episode: "Road Show"
1989	Polly	Miss Snow	TV movie
1989–90	Christine Cromwell	Samantha Cromwell	4 episodes
1990	Polly: Comin' Home!	Miss Snow	TV movie
1991–92	Loving	Isabelle Alden	52 episodes
1992	Cheers	Grandmother Gaines	Episode: "No Rest for the Woody"
1995	Great Performances		Episode: "Talking With"
1996	Home of the Brave	Hattie Greene	TV movie
1996	Once You Meet a Stranger	Clara	TV movie
1996	Touched by an Angel	Hattie Greene	Episode: "Promised Land"
1996–99	Promised Land	Hattie Greene	67 episodes
1997	Touched by an Angel	Hattie Greene	2 episodes
1998	Touched by an Angel	Hattie Greene	Episode: "Vengeance Is Mine: Part 1"
2000	The Beat	Frances Robinson	13 episodes
2002	Third Watch	Florence	Episode: "Transformed"
2004	Whoopi	Diana	Episode: "The Squatters"

=== Theatre ===
Year	Title	Role	Venue
1938	Gloriana	Lady Mary	Little Theatre, Broadway
1940	The Time of Your Life	Mary L	Booth Theatre, Broadway
1940	Another Sun	Maria	National Theatre, Broadway
1940	The Return of the Vagabond	His Daughter	National Theatre, Broadway
1941	Eight O'Clock Tuesday	Marcia Godden	Henry Miller's Theatre, Broadway
1941	My Fair Ladies	Lady Keith-Odlyn	Hudson Theatre, Broadway
1942	Papa Is All	Emma	Guild Theatre, Broadway
1942	All the Comforts of Home	Fifi Oritanski	Longacre Theatre, Broadway
1942	The Damask Cheek	Calla Longstreth	Playhouse Theatre, Broadway
1943	Oklahoma!	Ado Annie Carnes	St. James Theatre, Broadway
1944	Bloomer Girl	Evalina	Shubert Theatre, Broadway
1950	Affairs of State	Irene Elliott	Music Box Theatre, Broadway
1951	The King and I	Anna Leonowens (replacement)	St. James Theatre, Broadway
1952	Anna Christie	Anna Christopherson	Lyceum Theatre, Broadway
1954	His and Hers	Maggie Palmer	48th Street Theatre, Broadway
1958	Interlock	Mrs. Price	ANTA Theatre, Broadway
1958	Third Best Sport	Helen Sayre	Ambassador Theatre, Broadway
1960	Invitation to a March	Camilla Jablonski	Music Box Theatre, Broadway
1967	Mame	Mame Dennis (replacement)	Broadway Theatre, Broadway
1970	Candida	Candida	Longacre Theatre, Broadway
1973	The Irregular Verb To Love	Hedda Rankin	The Pocono Playhouse, PA
1975	Light Up The Sky		Ford's Theatre, Washington, DC
1975	Habeas Corpus	Lady Rumpers	Martin Beck Theatre, Broadway
1979	The Utter Glory of Morrissey Hall	Julia Faysle	Mark Hellinger Theatre, Broadway
1983	Hay Fever	Judith Bliss	Ahmanson Theatre, Los Angeles
1988	The Show Off	Mrs. Fisher	Williamstown Theatre, MA
1990	The Cocktail Hour		Philadelphia Theatre Company
1991	I Hate Hamlet	Lilian Troy	Walter Kerr Theatre, Broadway
1994	Allegro	Grandma Taylor	New York City Center
1994	Love Letters	Melissa Gardner	Williamstown Theatre, MA

=== Radio ===
Year	Title	Notes	Ref.
1946	The Bob Crosby Show	Guest	
1950	Everybody Does It	Episode of Screen Guild Theater	
1952	Up in Central Park	Episode of Music In the Air	
1952	Foreign Affairs	Episode of Screen Guild Theater	
1953	Cluny Brown	Episode of Star Playhouse	
1976	Afterward	Episode of CBS Radio Mystery Theater	

== Awards and nominations ==
Year	Award	Category	Nominated work	Result	Ref.
1947	Academy Awards	Best Supporting Actress	Gentleman's Agreement	Won	
1949	Academy Awards	Best Supporting Actress	Come to the Stable	Nominated	
1950	Academy Awards	Best Supporting Actress	All About Eve	Nominated	
1987	Daytime Emmy Awards	Outstanding Guest Performer in a Drama Series	Loving	Nominated	
1968	Primetime Emmy Awards	Outstanding Achievement in Daytime Programming – Individuals	Insight	Nominated	
1979	Primetime Emmy Awards	Outstanding Supporting Actress in a Limited Series or a Special	Backstairs at the White House	Nominated	
1947	Golden Globe Awards	Best Supporting Actress – Motion Picture	Gentleman's Agreement	Won	
1947	New York Film Critics Circle Awards	Best Actress	Gentleman's Agreement	Nominated	

In 1960, Holm received two stars on the Hollywood Walk of Fame, one for her work in Motion Pictures located at 1500 Vine Street, and the other for her work on Television at the location 6821 Hollywood Blvd.
