= Kazuo Ueda (linguist) =

Japanese Yiddishist (born 1943)

- 上田和夫
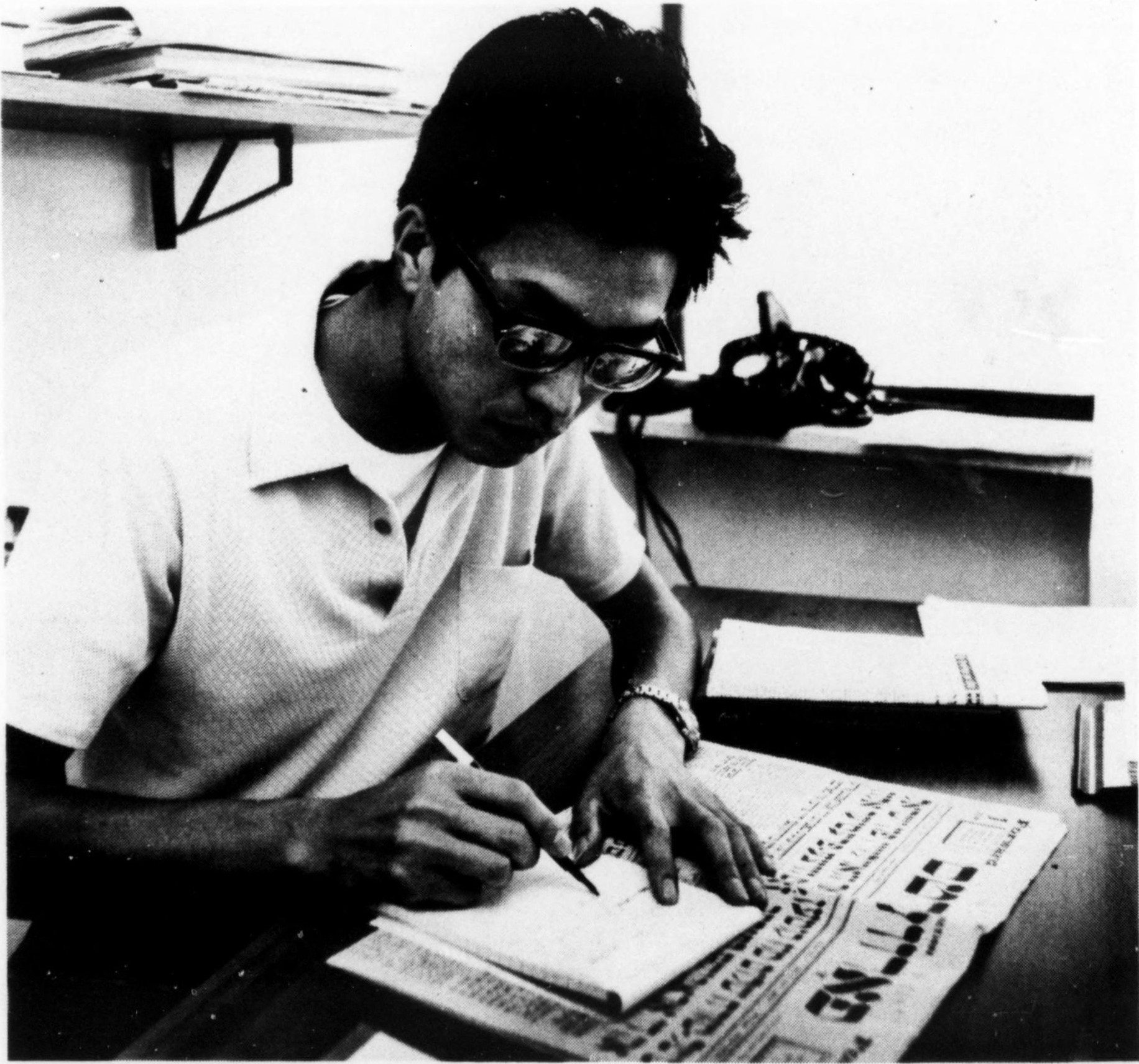
- Ueda in 1971
- Born: March 24, 1943 (age 83); Osaka, Japan
- Spouse: Kazuko Ueda

Academic background
- Education: Kōchi University; University of Tokyo; Hebrew University of Jerusalem

Academic work
- Discipline: Yiddishist
- Institutions: Ehime University; Kōchi University; Fukuoka University
- Notable works: "Idisshugo bunpoo gairyaku" (1970); Idisshugo bunpoo nyuumon / Arajnfir in der jidišer gramatik (1985); Idisshugo Jiten (2010)

Kazuo Ueda (Note: Japanese: 上田和夫, Hepburn: Ueda Kazuo, Yiddish: קאַזואָ אוּעדאַ.) (born March 24, 1943) is a Japanese linguist and scholar. He is Japan's leading Yiddishist.

Ueda graduated from Kōchi University and received a master's degree in German literature from the University of Tokyo. While studying German-language Jewish writer Franz Kafka in graduate school, he learned of Yiddish. He said it fascinated him because reading it felt like solving a puzzle. He was mostly self-taught, with some aid from Japan's limited Jewish community and multiple visits to Israel. One of two scholars to introduce the study of Yiddish to Japan, Ueda published the first Japanese examination of Yiddish grammar and literature in 1970, the first Japanese book on Yiddish in 1985, and the first Japanese dictionary on Yiddish in 2010. His Yiddish dictionary was the first in a non-European language, besides Hebrew. Ueda also worked on Ladino, as a scholar of Kafka, and on Jewish studies. Beginning in 1969 and until he retired in 2012, Ueda was a German studies professor at Ehime, Kōchi, and Fukuoka University.

== Early life and education ==
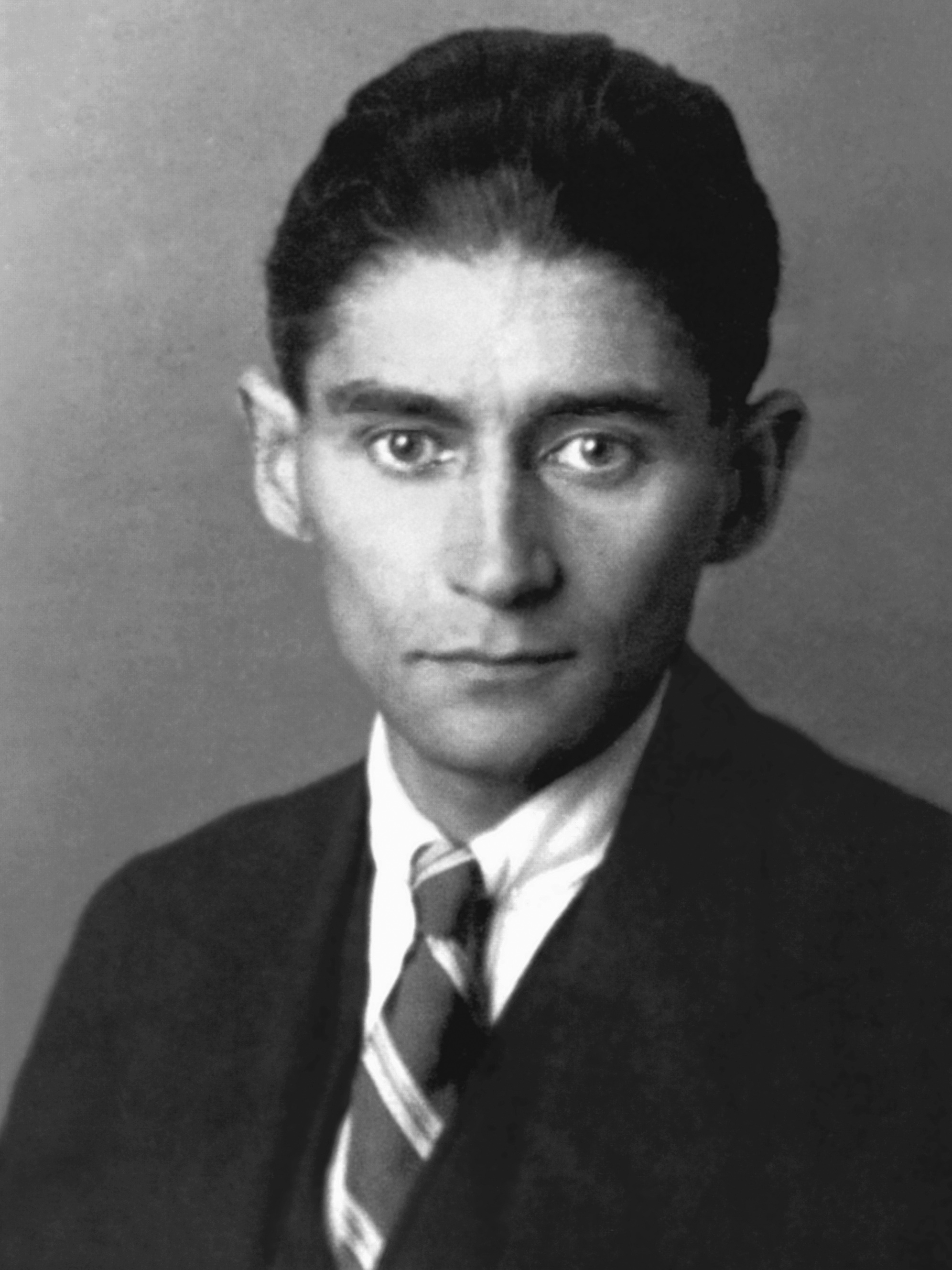
Franz Kafka in 1923; Ueda learned of Yiddish by studying Kafka's works.

Kazuo Ueda was born on March 24, 1943, in Osaka. He grew up in Kyoto Prefecture and graduated from Kyoto Prefecture Suchi High School in March 1961. He began attending Kōchi University in April 1962 and graduated from its literature department with a specialization in German studies in March 1966. In April, he began attending graduate school at the University of Tokyo's German literature and language program. He graduated with a master's degree in German literature in March 1969. He learned of Yiddish while studying German-language Jewish writer Franz Kafka in graduate school, with sources differing on whether it was from reading his diaries or literature, or from a lecturer, Hajime Yamashita, offhandedly mentioning that Kafka was interested in Yiddish theater.

Ueda began studying Biblical Hebrew in 1967 and then he spent four years learning Modern Hebrew at the Jewish Community of Japan. He often came to Japan's only synagogue for assistance but mostly taught himself by reading Yiddish newspapers and literature. Marvin Tokayer, then the only rabbi in Japan, recalled that Ueda called him from a payphone in 1969 and that he had asked to meet with Ueda after being surprised that he knew Yiddish. He recalled that Ueda read the Yiddish-language Jewish Morning Journal while riding the Tokyo subway, often asked him questions about Yiddish vocabulary, and listened to tapes of him singing Yiddish lullabies. Tokayer said that Ueda had taught himself a "very respectable" amount of Yiddish. Ueda credits his interest in Yiddish to its uniqueness and because reading it felt like solving a puzzle.

Mea Shearim in 1964; Ueda lived in Mea Shearim for some time

In July 1971, Ueda came to the Hebrew University of Jerusalem on a one-year grant from the Israeli government to learn more about Yiddish. He focused on his Hebrew by attending an ulpan given by the university and also attended Yiddish clubs in Tel Aviv and Jerusalem. Ueda visited Israel multiple times, including another stay at the Hebrew University from 1983 to 1984, and for a time he lived in the Yiddish-speaking Haredi neighborhood Mea Shearim. Scholar Yechiel Szeintuch later recalled a conversation with Ueda in Israel where Ueda said that Yiddish was layered like an onion; he first studied in Israel because he needed to understand Hebrew to understand Yiddish, and when he returned it was because he needed to understand Hassidim and similar topics to understand Yiddish literature. He also studied Arabic. Ueda studied at the University of Trier for three months in 1985 and at the University of Vienna from April 1996 to March 1997. He also studied at the Uriel Weinreich summer course at Columbia University in 1975, at a summer course at Bar-Ilan University in Israel, and at the first Yiddish summer course held in Birobidzhan, administrative center of the Jewish Autonomous Oblast, which took place at the Far Eastern State Social and Humanitarian Academy in 2007.

== Career ==
Ueda began lecturing at the German department of Ehime University in Matsuyama in April 1969. He was one of two scholars to introduce the study of Yiddish to Japan, alongside linguist Katsuhiko Tanaka. Tanaka learned Yiddish c. 1970 while in Bonn, and Ueda credits him with introducing Yiddish to a broad Japanese audiences. Ueda is Japan's leading Yiddishist, has been described as the "virtual founder of Japanese Yiddish studies", and was the only Japanese person extensively working on Yiddish linguistics for a period. Before Ueda began his work, Yiddish's presence in Japan was limited to translations of translations of Yiddish literature. (Note: For example, Ryo Namikawa made a Japanese translation of Sholem Asch's Mary in 1934, by translating an English translation.) Ueda's first work on Yiddish, a 1970 (Note: In Wexler (1990), Ueda incorrectly dates its publication to 1971 while attaching a bibliography of his work that correctly dates its publication to 1970.) journal article on Yiddish grammar, was the first Japanese examination of Yiddish grammar and literature. His works often compared Yiddish and German. One 1980 work that did so faced criticism as too brief and simplistic by Yiddish scholar David L. Gold, albeit with Gold allowing that his examination was somewhat unfair as he did not speak Japanese. In 1973, Ueda became an associate professor at both Ehime and Kōchi University. In 1983, he became a professor at Kōchi University.

Ueda's Idisshugo bunpoo nyuumon / Arajnfir in der jidišer gramatik, a primer on Yiddish grammar, was published by Daigaku Syorin in 1985. It was the first Japanese book on Yiddish. It is 267 pages long and includes standard features of grammar books, an introduction to the history of Yiddish, and brief directions to resources and institutions which focus on Yiddish. The book follows YIVO's 1926 orthography while noting Soviet practices. It does not include reader exercises. Stanley Dubinsky and Paul Wexler reviewed it as valuable and competent. They identified its target audience as Japanese specialists in German, the same as Ueda's background, while noting that it does not compare the two as in Ueda's prior work and that it did not account for the language's complexity for learners. They had minor criticisms of its discussion of Yiddish grammar sometimes being unnecessarily vague, not in-depth enough, and forgetting exceptions or minor elements; for instance, it transliterates but never defines rabbi and rebbe. While crediting its history of Yiddish for being the first in Japanese, they found that it contained some inaccuracies and outdated theories. Ueda would later acknowledge that the book had shortcomings and errors, directing readers to follow a new book he published in 2000 when the two conflicted. After the publication of Idisshugo bunpoo nyuumon, Masato Sato, Daigaku Syorin's president, said that the company would continue to publish works on Yiddish in an effort to eliminate what he called a Japanese prejudice towards only learning "'great' Western European languages". The book had 2,000 copies printed, which Ueda credited to Japanese interest in learning foreign languages.

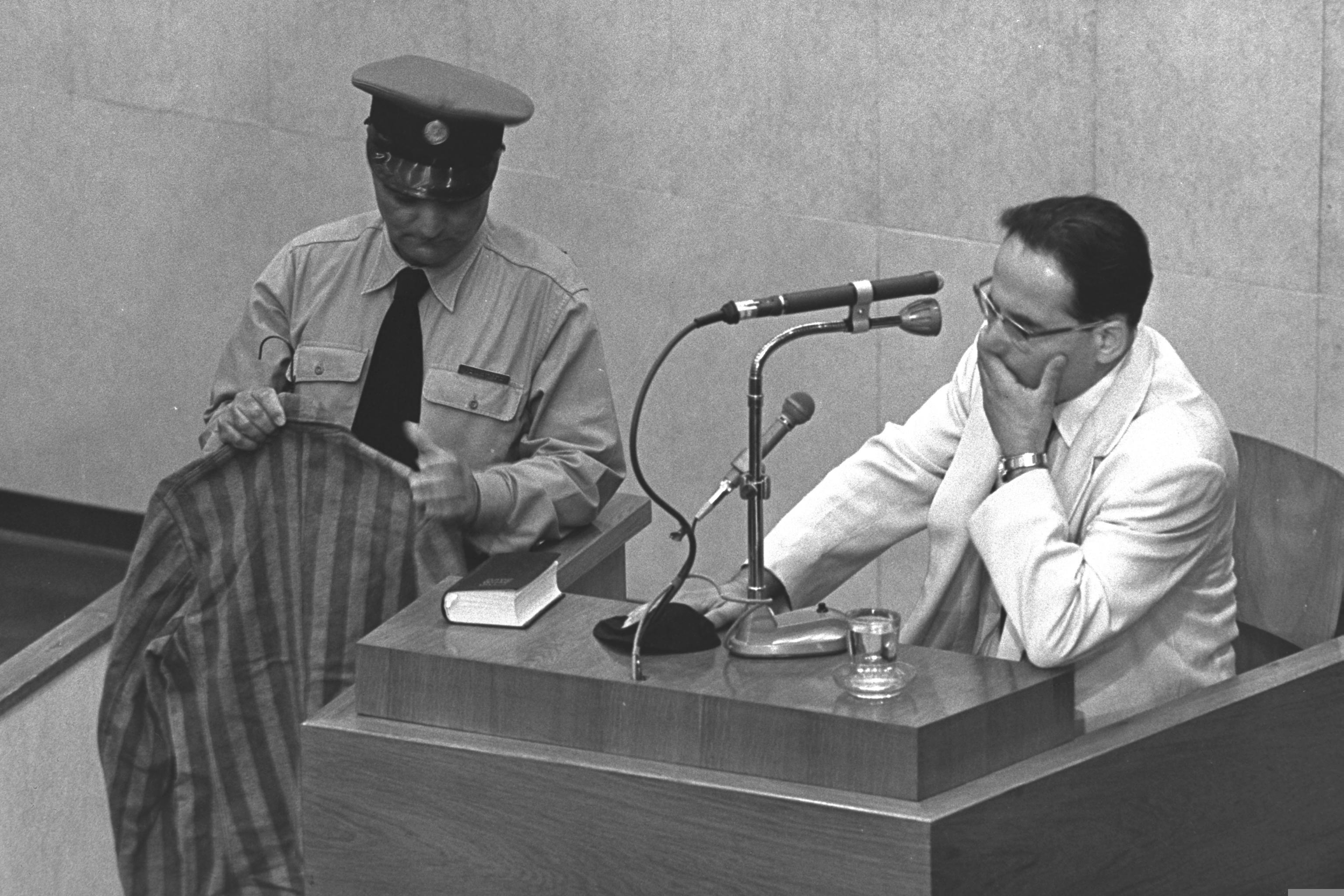
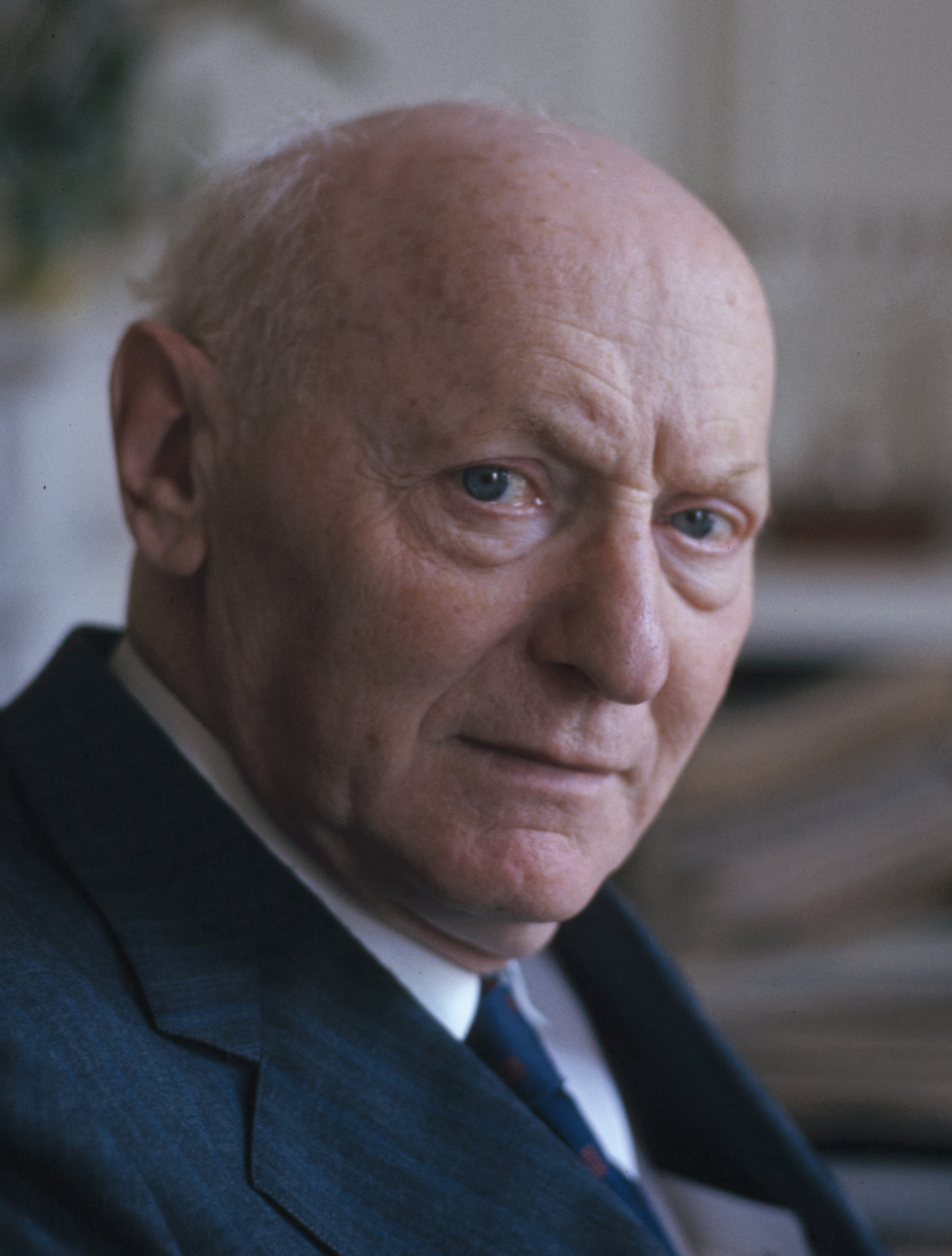
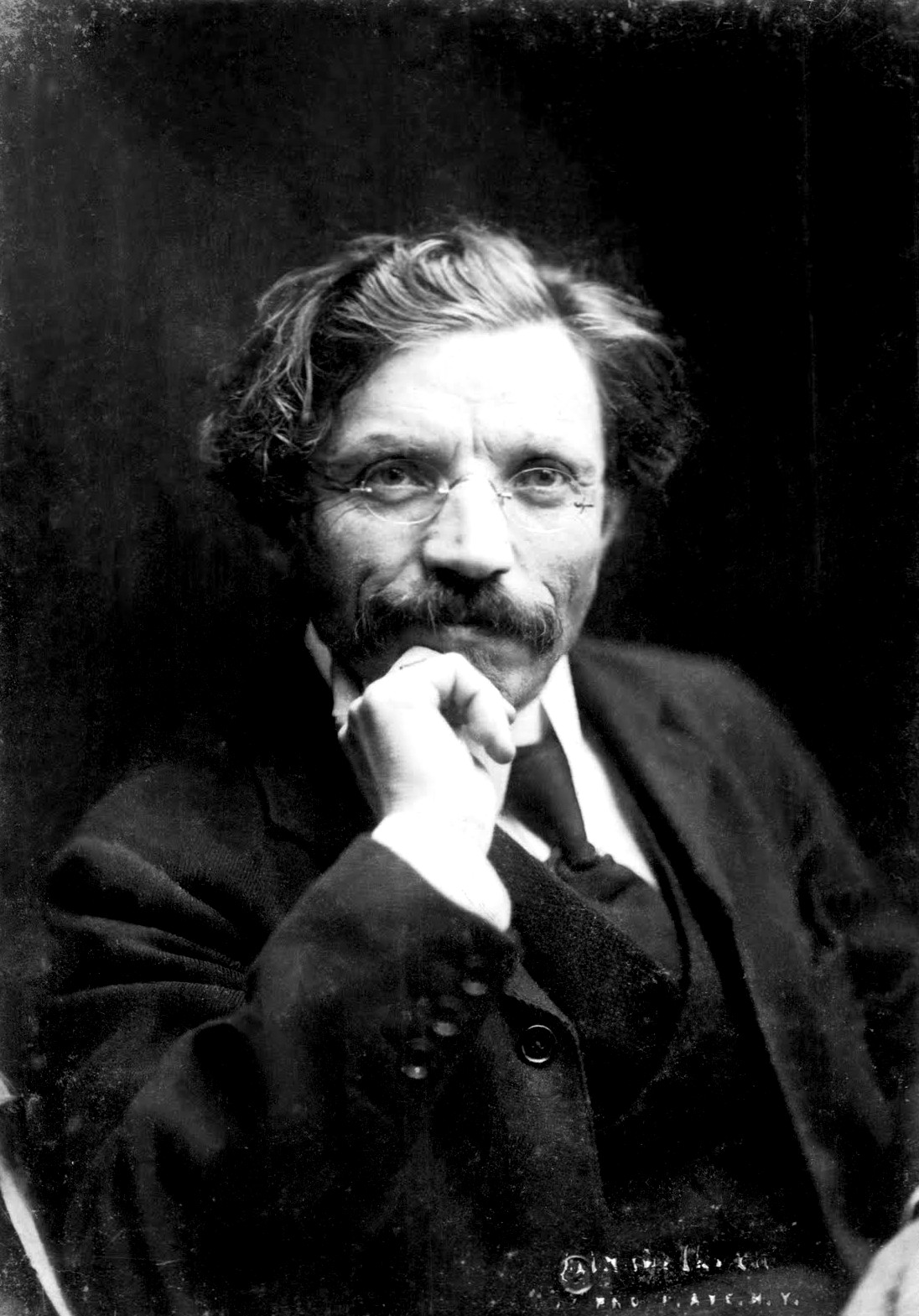
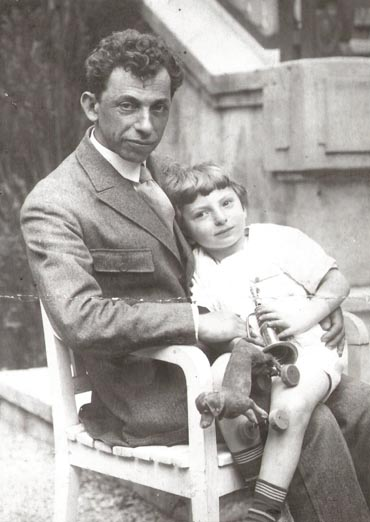
Some of the authors whose works Ueda translated. From left to right: Ka-Tzetnik 135633, Isaac Bashevis Singer, Sholem Aleichem, David Bergelson.

Ueda became a professor at Fukuoka University in 1990, living on Kyushu and working at its German department. Ueda also worked extensively on compiling and translating into German four Yiddish plays that Kafka saw and commented on in his diary. This effort made the plays widely accessible. Ueda attributed an increased interest in Yiddish among Japanese to its significance in Jewish American literature. The Japanese Association for Yiddish Studies was founded in 1988 by Ueda, comparative literature professor Masahiko Nishi, and German assistant professor Kurahei Ogino, and in 1992 it had about 20 members. Ueda said that he hoped to teach a course on Yiddish in 1984, and a few years later he said that he hoped to begin teaching a regular course on it. Ueda organized a panel on Yiddish with nine Western scholars at the 1990 International Germanists Conference. In 1995, he published a parallel text book chrestomathy for Japanese learners which included three short stories by Yiddish writers Avrom Reyzen, I. L. Peretz, and Sholem Aleichem. He also coauthored two Japanese-Yiddish phrasebooks with American Yiddishist Troim Katz Handler. Handler recalled that she had never spoke or met with Ueda and that she only communicated with him by letters written in Yiddish. He also published a bilingual glossary.

Ueda also worked on the Sephardic language Ladino, writing two works on it after compiling a vocabulary list of Aki Yerushalayim; he said this effort was part of his broader work on Jewish languages. Ueda also worked in Jewish studies, which included his 1986 book The Jews (ユダヤ人) and his 1996 book Yiddish Culture (イディッシュ文化). Ueda supervised the English and Yiddish subtitles of the Israeli film Choice and Destiny, which was presented at the 1995 Yamagata International Documentary Film Festival.

== Views ==
In 1971, Ueda recalled that many Israelis he met were surprised about his interest in Yiddish. He described this as regrettable and theorized it was possibly because Yiddish "reflects the tragic history of the Jews". In 1984, he recalled his disappointment at the reaction of many Israelis and reiterated his theory. However, he said he had come to understand the reaction, while maintaining the value of Yiddish and its literature. In his 1996 book Yiddish Culture, Ueda wrote that Yiddish poet Abraham Sutzkever being awarded the Israel Prize in 1985 was proof that the Israeli government had acknowledged Yiddish's value. Ueda believed that culture should be preserved as a shared heritage of humanity. Ueda's linguistic philosophy was to not favor or disfavor any part of a language as good or bad.

In his 1986 book The Jews, Ueda credited the blossoming of Spanish culture to the coexistence of Jews and Muslims and identified the Christian persecution of Jews in Spain as a contributing factor to Spain's decline. He also praised Vladimir Lenin's policies on Jews, which he contrasted with Joseph Stalin's antisemitic actions. He found that Jewish rights expanded during revolutionary periods and declined during counter-revolutionary periods. In a different 1986 writing, Ueda rejected a genetic explanation for the Jewish genius stereotype, while accepting the stereotype itself and aimed to explain it through social and historical factors.

While writing on the Arab–Israeli conflict in The Jews, unlike the generally a priori pro-Arab position of most Japanese scholarship, Ueda's perspective leans pro-Israeli. He criticized the making of comparisons between Israel and Nazi Germany as especially hurtful to Jewish Israelis. He criticized some Israeli actions as excessive, such as the construction of new Jewish settlements in the West Bank, and the rationale that justified it, that Jews had lived in the same area two millennia prior. However, Ueda's conclusion was that Jews should not have to suffer anymore after having returned to their ancestral homeland after a prolonged exile.

== Magnum opus and retirement ==
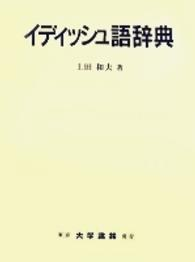
Cover of the dictionary

Ueda compiled and edited the unidirectional Yiddish-Japanese Dictionary (イディッシュ語辞典, Idisshugo Jiten), (Note: Yiddish: ייִדיש־יאַפּאַניש ווערטערבוך, Yidish-Yapanish Verterbukh) which was published by Daigaku Syorin in 2010. It was the first of its kind and the first Yiddish dictionary in a non-European language, besides Hebrew. Ueda considers it his magnum opus. It is 1,302 pages long and has over 28,000 entries. He was aided by Yiddish scholars Holger Nath and Boris Kotlerman. Kotlerman said that he worked on thousands of words, particularly Slavisms, and that Nath focused on Germanisms. In an interview with The Forward, Kotlerman recalled that Ueda had brought in Japanese assistants fluent in Russian and English and that they would find Japanese glosses for words after Kotlerman supplied their definitions in English and Russian. Linguist Ross Perlin applauded the use of entries from Uriel Weinreich's well-regarded Yiddish dictionary, which Ueda said was the source for about 25,000 entries. Japanese Yiddish teacher Mitsuharu Akao, who began learning Yiddish with the help of Ueda's grammar textbook, noted that Idisshugo Jiten was one of the largest Yiddish dictionaries ever compiled, and Perlin noted that it had surpassed Weinreich's in length and was only 9,000 entries shorter than Yitskhok Niborski's well-regarded 2002 French-Yiddish dictionary.

Perlin observed that translating Yiddish and Japanese must have been challenging, noting especially that "Yiddish is sweet on diminutives while Japanese thrills with honorifics". Perlin noted in particular that some idioms and interjections, such as oy, had "fallen by the wayside" due to these challenges. Ueda emphasized the dictionary's focus on Soviet Yiddish, with it including an introduction to Soviet Yiddish's orthography and grammatical gender. Akao found that Soviet Yiddish vocabulary is about as well represented in the dictionary as vocabulary found in dictionaries by Weinreich and Alexander Harkavy. The dictionary also features Germanisms, which are disfavored by American Yiddishists. Ueda justified this decision by saying that they had entered into Soviet Yiddish and so could not be excluded. Akao doubted if Ueda had treated words of Hebrew origin as well; Ueda said that he did not utilize Niborski's dictionary on such words, a decision Akao disagreed with.

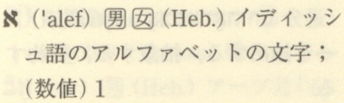
The entry for the non-diacritical alef, the first letter in the Yiddish alphabet.

Perlin and Akao both praised the dictionary's example sentences; they are drawn from various sources but primarily from the Soviet Yiddish-language Sovetish Heymland. Akao praised the fact that many examples were idiomatic and complete sentences, saying that he would understand if those example sentences were one of the most challenging parts of writing the dictionary. Perlin and Akao both praised the inclusion of transliterations for words into the Latin script, which Perlin described as "user-friendly" and which Akao described as attractive for those unable to read Hebrew script. Perlin and Akao both praised the inclusion of markings for the origin of each word, such as Slavisms, Germanisms, and Hebraisms. Akao found that it helped gain insight into Yiddish's linguistic structure. Perlin described the dictionary as "serious but accessible" and also praised the use of YIVO's orthography.

As of 2012, the dictionary cost ¥60,000, which was then nearly $770. Japanese Yiddishist Tsvi Sadan praised the dictionary, except for its price, Tokayer joked that he would buy it used, and Perlin noted that it was expensive even when accounting for Japan's high cost-of-living. Daigaku Syorin declined to provide details on its sales but acknowledged that they were likely tiny. The book's target audience of Japanese Yiddishists is not large. Ueda said he wrote it because he enjoyed learning about Yiddish and had not expected it to spur new interest in the language. He felt the dictionary was cheap when accounting for the 20 years of labor it took and associated health costs. His wife Kazuko said that he worked on it constantly. Before it was completed, he began showing signs of Parkinson's disease. Kazuko blamed his work on the dictionary for aggravating it and Ueda's doctors said the work may have shortened his life. In March 2012, he retired from Fukuoka University, and as of April 2012, he struggled to speak or walk. In an interview with NPR, Ueda said that he did not regret working on the dictionary, which he pats before going to bed.

== Legacy ==
Jack Halpern, a Yiddish-speaking linguist living in Japan, praised Ueda but described the reaction of Jews who learn of his work as befuddlement. Akao rejected the notion that his dictionary would only be an item kept by native Jews for its perceived exoticness, and Perlin and Akao both found it to be a significant achievement in the history of Yiddish lexicography. Rebecca White of the Yiddish Book Center found Ueda's works to be the most notable Japanese works on Yiddish culture. At the time she wrote, the center had not been able to acquire his dictionary but it had acquired his 1970 journal article on Yiddish grammar, his 1985 primer on Yiddish grammar, and his parallel text book. Japanese Yiddish scholar Yuu Nishimura credited Ueda's achievements, alongside those of Nishi and the research of others, with making Yiddish more accessible in Japan and spurring an increased interest in Jewish history.

== List of works ==
This list of works by Ueda include those he noted as relating to Yiddish while contributing to Paul Wexler's 1990 book Studies in Yiddish Linguistics, those listed in the bibliography of his works published by Fukuoka University in March 2013 following his retirement, and those held by the National Diet Library, the national library of Japan.

=== Books ===
- Ueda, Kazuo (1985). Idisshugo bunpoo nyuumon (イディッシュ語文法入門) / Arajnfir in der jidišer gramatik [Introduction to Yiddish Grammar]. Tokyo: Daigaku Syorin.
- — (1986). ユダヤ人 [The Jews]. Tokyo: Kodansha. ISBN 9784475017480
- — (1989). イディッシュ語基礎1500語 [1500 Basic Words of Yiddish]. Tokyo: Daigaku Syorin. ISBN 9784475011075
- — (1993). イディッシュ語常用6000語 [6000 Common Yiddish Words]. Tokyo: Daigaku Syorin. ISBN 9784475011952
- —; Handler, Troim Katz (1996). イディッシュ語会話練習帳 [Yiddish Conversation Practice Book]. Tokyo: Daigaku Syorin. ISBN 9784475012980
- — (1996). イディッシュ文化─東欧ユダヤ人のこころの遺産 [Yiddish Culture: The Spiritual Heritage of Eastern European Jews]. Tokyo: Sanseido. ISBN 978-4385357553
- — (1999). ユダヤ・スペイン語基礎1500語 [1500 Basic Words of Judeo-Spanish]. Tokyo: Daigaku Syorin. ISBN 9784475011204
- —; Handler, Troim Katz (2000). エクスプレス・イディッシュ語 [Express Yiddish]. Hakusuisha. ISBN 9784560005477
- —; Nath, Holger; Kotlerman, Boris (2010). Idisshugo Jiten (イディッシュ語辞典) [Yiddish-Japanese Dictionary]. Tokyo: Daigaku Syorin. ISBN 978-4-475-00162-5.

=== Journal articles ===
- Ueda, Kazuo (February 1970). "Idisshugo bunpoo gairyaku" (イディッシュ語文法概略) [Yiddish Grammar in Brief]. Ehime Daigaku Kyokobu kiyo [Memoirs of the Faculty of General Education, Ehime University] (2). Matsuyama: 111–151
- — (1970). "イディッシュ語概略" [Yiddish in Brief]. Yudaya isuraeru kenkyuu [Study of Judaism and Israel] (7). Tokyo: 26–31
- — (1970). "Iddishugo ni okeru haigo, nooto" [Background of Yiddish, Notes]. Doitsu bungaku ronshuu [German Literature Essay Collection] (4). Hirsohima: 34–41
- — (1980). "イディッシュ語とドイツ語" [Yiddish and German]. Doitsu bungaku [German Literature] (64). Tokyo: 117–125
- — (1981). イディッシュ語とその文学 [Yiddish and its literature]. Ehime doitsu bungaku [German Literature, Ehime] (4). Matsuyama: 13–26
- — (1981). "Zoku. Idisshugo to doitsogu" [Yiddish and German Genus]. Doitsu bungaku ronshuu [German Literature Essay Collection] (14). Okayama: 30–42
- — (1982). "Franz Kafka und die jiddische Literatur I" (Note: Japanese: カフカとイディッシュ文学) [Franz Kafka and Yiddish Literature I]. 高知大学学術研究報告 [Kōchi University Academic Research Reports] (31). 189–222
- — (1983). "Franz Kafka und die jiddische Literatur II" [Franz Kafka and Yiddish Literature II]. 高知大学学術研究報告 [Kōchi University Academic Research Reports] (32). 1–33
- — (1985). "イディッシュ語における「時称の一致」ードイツ語と比較して" [Verb tense consistency in the Yiddish language: A comparison with the German language]. Doitsu gogaku kenkyuu [Study of German Linguistics] (1). Tokyo: 245–271
- — (1988). "Kafkas Amerika-Roman und zwei jiddische Gedichte" (Note: Japanese: カフカの「アメリカ」小説と二つのイディッシュ語詩) [Kafka's novel Amerika and two Yiddish poems]. 高知大学学術研究報告 [Kōchi University Academic Research Reports] (37). 193–206.
- — (1990). ヨーゼフ・ラタイネルの「セデルの夜」がカフカのユダヤ性とその作品にもつ意味 (Note: Published in German.) [Joseph Lateiner's Seder Night and its significance for Kafka's Jewishness and His Works]. Proceedings of the 8th International Congress of Germanists. 8. Iudicium. pp. 459–465
- — (2002). "ユダヤ・スペイン語日常語語彙集成" [Collection of Vocabulary of Judeo-Spanish]. 福岡大学研究部論集. A, 人文科学編 [The Bulletin of Central Research Institute, Fukuoka University. Ser. A, Humanities]. 1 (8): 61–220.
- — (2004). "『ユダヤ・スペイン語日常語語彙集成』・補遺" [Collection of Vocabulary of Judeo-Spanish - Supplement]. 福岡大學人文論叢 [Fukuoka University Review of Literature & Humanities]. 36 (1): 257–266.
- — (2008). "ドイツ語から見たイディッシュ語の特徴(1)イディッシュ語に対するスラブ語の影響" [Characteristics of Yiddish from the Perspective of German (1): The Influence of Slavic Languages on Yiddish]. 福岡大學人文論叢 [Fukuoka University Review of Literature & Humanities]. 40 (3): 753–777.
- — (2009). "ドイツ語から見たイディッシュ語の特徴(2)イディッシュ語に対するスラブ語の影響" [Characteristics of Yiddish from the Perspective of German (2): The Influence of Slavic Languages on Yiddish]. 福岡大學人文論叢 [Fukuoka University Review of Literature & Humanities]. 41 (1): 175–256.

=== Chapters ===
- Ueda, Kazuo (1973). "Yudayago" [Jewish language]. Encyclopaedia Britannica (Japanese edition) (19). Tokyo: 705–707
- — (1988). Kamei, T.; Koono, R.; Chino, E. (eds.). "イディッシュ語" [Yiddish]. Sanseidoo gengogaku daijiten [Sanseido Encyclopedia of Linguistics] (4). Tokyo: 615–633
- — (1990). "Yiddish Studies in Japan". In Wexler, Paul (ed.). Studies in Yiddish Linguistics. Tübingen: Max Niemeyer Verlag. pp. 167–169. ISBN 3-484-60345-3.
- — (2008). "Jiddischforschung in Japan" [Yiddish Studies in Japan]. In Denz, Rebekka; Dubrau, Alexander A.; Riemer, Nathanael (eds.). Jiddische Quellen. Vereinigung für Jüdische Studien. University of Potsdam. pp. 168–171. ISBN 978-3-940793-41-6.

=== Magazines and other periodicals ===
- Ueda, Kazuo (November 20, 1976). イディッシュ文学の展望 [An Overview of Yiddish Literature]. The Yomiuri Shimbun.
- — (November 1981). イディッシュ語 [Yiddish]. Anecdotes about World Languages (世界のことばこぼれ話). The World of Translation. p. 8.
- — (May 1982). 外国語のすすめ「イディッシュ語」 [An Introduction to Foreign Languages: Yiddish]. 言語 [Gengo]. Taishukan.
- —, ed. (November 1983). "Jewish American Literature Special Number". Eigo Seinen. Kenkyusha Publishers.
- — (May 1989). しいたげられた言語（イディッシュ語のすすめ） [An Oppressed Language (An Introduction to Yiddish)]. 言語 [Gengo]. Taishukan. pp. 18–23.
- — (June 1989). さまざまな混成語（イディッシュ語のすすめ） [Various Hybrid Languages (An Introduction to Yiddish)]. 言語 [Gengo]. Taishukan. pp. 101–105.
- — (July 1989). 西イディッシュ語の話（イディッシュ語のすすめ） [On Western Yiddish (An Introduction to Yiddish)]. 言語 [Gengo]. Taishukan. pp. 104–109.
- — (August 1989). 東イディッシュ語の話（イディッシュ語のすすめ） [On Eastern Yiddish (An Introduction to Yiddish)]. 言語 [Gengo]. Taishukan. pp. 96–101.
- — (September 1989). ソ連のイディッシュ語（イディッシュ語のすすめ） [Yiddish in the Soviet Union (An Introduction to Yiddish)]. 言語 [Gengo]. Taishukan. pp. 102–105.
- — (April 2012). 中欧とイディッシュ語 [Yiddish and Central Europe]. Thought (1,056). Iwanami Shoten. Tokyo: 278–291.

=== Translations ===
- Ka-Tzetnik 135633 (1974). "Farbrante erd" [Scorched earth]. Doitsu bungaku ronshuu [German Literature Essay Collection] (7). Translated by Ueda, Kazuo. Hiroshima: 50–62.
- Segal, Kalman (1976). "戦争のあと" [Nokh der milkhome, After the war]. Ehime doitsu bungaku [German Literature, Ehime] (4). Translated by Ueda, Kazuo. Matsuyama: 67–81.
- Singer, Isaac Bashevis (1991) [1966]. [ヤギと少年, The Goat and the Boy]. Translated by Ueda, Kazuo. Tokyo: Ikubundo ISBN 4261010402
- Goldfaden, Abraham (1992) [1886]. Ueda, Kazuo (ed.). Schulamiss. Transkription der jiddischen Texte, die Kafka sah, in die lateinische Schrift mit Anmerkungen. Vol. 2. Fukuoka University. pp. 1–64.
- Scharkansky, Abraham (1992) [1907]. Ueda, Kazuo (ed.). Kol-Nidrej. Transkription der jiddischen Texte, die Kafka sah, in die lateinische Schrift mit Anmerkungen. Vol. 2. Fukuoka University. pp. 65–139.
- Goldfaden, Abraham (1994) [1887]. Ueda, Kazuo (ed.). Bar-Kochba. Transkription der jiddischen Texte, die Kafka sah, in die lateinische Schrift mit Anmerkungen. Vol. 3. Fukuoka University. pp. 1–84.
- Gordin, Jacob (1994) [1899]. Ueda, Kazuo (ed.). Di Schctite. Transkription der jiddischen Texte, die Kafka sah, in die lateinische Schrift mit Anmerkungen. Vol. 3. Fukuoka University. pp. 85–163.
- Ueda, Kazuo (1995). イディッシュ語読本 [Yiddish Chrestomathy]. Tokyo: Daigaku Syorin. ISBN 4-475-01815-3
  - Reyzen, Avrom (1947). "דעם זיידנס זייגער" [祖父の時計, Grandfather's Clock]. The Workmen's Circle.
  - Peretz, I. L. (1972). "דער קונצן־מאַכער" [手品師, The Magician]. Books for Libraries Press. Translated by Sol Liptzin.
  - Sholem Aleichem (1947). "דאס מעסערל" [ナイフ, The Knife]. The Workmen's Circle.
  - Mlotek, Yoseph (August 2, 1991). "גרויסער עולם פארעדער באגלייטן יצחק באשעוויס־זינגער צו זיין אייביקן" [多数のファンがイツホク・バシェヴィス・ジンガーの永遠の眠りに同行, A large crowd of admirers accompanies Isaac Bashevis Singer to his final resting place]. The Forward.
  - Bergelson, David; Kazakevich, Emmanuil (1989). "די שטאָט ביראָבידזשאַן" and "ביראָבידזשאַן — ייִדישע אָטאָנאָמע געגנט" ["ビロビジャン市" and "ビロビジャン—ユダヤ人自治区", "The City of Birobidzhan" and "Birobidzhan – Jewish Autonomous Oblast"]. In Vergelis, Aron (ed.). די וועלט איז פֿאַר דיר אָפֿן [The World Is Open to You]. Khabarovsk Book Publishing.
- Baumgarten, Jean (1996) [1990]. Le Yiddish [イディッシュ語, Yiddish]. Translated by Ueda, Kazuo; Okamoto, Katsuto. Tokyo: Hakusuisha ISBN 9784560057841
- Lateiner, Joseph (2001) [1908]. Ueda, Kazuo (ed.). Di Ssejdernacht. Transkription der jiddischen Texte, die Kafka sah, in die lateinische Schrift mit Anmerkungen. Vol. 1. Fukuoka University. pp. 1–69.
- Gordin, Jacob (2001) [1907]. Ueda, Kazuo (ed.). Der Wilder Mensch. Transkription der jiddischen Texte, die Kafka sah, in die lateinische Schrift mit Anmerkungen. Vol. 1. Fukuoka University. pp. 71–125.
- Gordin, Jacob (2001) [1903]. Ueda, Kazuo (ed.). Got, Mensch un Tajwel. Transkription der jiddischen Texte, die Kafka sah, in die lateinische Schrift mit Anmerkungen. Vol. 1. Fukuoka University. pp. 127–227.
- Brenner, Michael (August 2014) [1996]. ワイマール時代のユダヤ文化ルネサンス [The Renaissance of Jewish Culture in Weimar Germany]. Translated by Ueda, Kazuo. Kyobunkwan.

== See also ==
- A language is a dialect with an army and navy, aphorism on Yiddish popularized by Max Weinreich
- Mori Ōgai (1862–1922), Japanese physician who introduced German to Japanese audiences
- James Curtis Hepburn (1815–1911), American physician who popularized the dominant form of Japanese romanization
