= William Dory =

American recording artist

William Dory was an American Yiddish-language recording artist with a brief career at the start of the twentieth century.

His repertoire consisted mainly of Yiddish Theatre music and novelty songs (1900–1901) recorded on wax cylinders for Edison Records (aka National Phonograph Co.). Although little is known about his personal or professional life, he was one of the first Yiddish-language recording artists in the United States. After he made eleven recordings for Edison (listed in 2 annual catalogs), he was replaced on their roster by Frank Seiden, who re-recorded Dory's general material on the new black-wax moulded cylinders (1902), and some specific titles of his as well.

== Selected recordings ==
- Kol Nidre, Religious (1900, Edison Records)
- Das Peshala, from The Pretty Miriam (1900, Edison Records, written by Sigmund Mogulesko)
- Der Boocher (1900, Edison Records)
- Der Pusick, from The Jew in Morocco (1900, Edison Records, from an unpublished play by Peretz Sandler and Sigmund Feinman)
- Die Strassenfrau (1900, Edison Records)
- Chosmas Noschim, Hebrew song (1901, Edison Records)
- A Biss'l von Oeben (1901, Edison Records)
- Die Lady von Broadway (1901, Edison Records)
- Das Pastuckel, from Bar Kochla (1901, Edison Records, from Bar Kokhba by Avram Goldfaden)
- Gott sieht und schweigt (1901, Edison Records)
- Koenig Lear (1901, Edison Records, probably from the opera The Yiddish King Lear by Jacob Gordin)
