= Maniac (1934 film) =

1934 film by Dwain Esper

- One-sheet poster
- Directed by: Dwain Esper
- Written by: Hildagarde Stadie
- Based on: "The Black Cat" by Edgar Allan Poe
- Produced by: Dwain Esper; Louis Sonney; Hildagarde Stadie
- Starring: William Woods; Horace B. Carpenter
- Cinematography: William C. Thompson
- Edited by: William Austin
- Production company: Roadshow Attractions
- Distributed by: Hollywood Producers and Distributors
- Release date: September 11, 1934
- Running time: 51 minutes
- Country: United States
- Language: English
- Budget: $7,500 (est.)

Maniac (also known as Sex Maniac) is a 1934 American independent black-and-white exploitation horror film directed by Dwain Esper and written by Hildagarde Stadie, Esper's wife, as a loose adaptation of the 1843 Edgar Allan Poe story "The Black Cat", with references to his "Murders in the Rue Morgue". Esper and Stadie also made the 1936 exploitation film Marihuana.

The film is in the public domain.

A restored version was made available in 1999, as part of a double feature with another Esper film, Narcotic! (1933). John Wilson, the founder of the Golden Raspberry Award, named Maniac one of the "100 Most Amusingly Bad Movies Ever Made" in his book The Official Razzie Movie Guide. Maniac has received negative reception since its release, considered as one of the worst films ever made.

== Plot ==
Maniac

Don Maxwell is a former vaudeville impersonator who's working as the lab assistant to Dr. Meirschultz, a mad scientist attempting to bring the dead back to life. When Don kills Meirschultz, he attempts to hide his crime by "becoming" the doctor, taking over his work, and copying his appearance/mannerisms. In the process, he slowly goes insane.

The "doctor" treats a mental patient, Buckley, but accidentally injects him with adrenaline, which causes the man to go into violent fits. In one of these fits, Buckley kidnaps a woman, tears her clothes off and rapes her. Buckley's wife discovers the body of the real doctor and blackmails Don for turning her husband into a zombie. The ersatz doctor turns the tables on her by manipulating the woman into fighting with his estranged wife, Alice Maxwell, a former showgirl.

When a cat-breeding neighbor, Goof, sees what's going on, he calls the police, who stop the fight and, following the sound of Satan the cat, find the body of the real doctor hidden behind a brick wall.

== Cast ==
- Bill Woods as Don Maxwell, a former vaudeville impersonator and Dr. Meirschultz's lab assistant
- Horace B. Carpenter as Dr. Meirschultz, a mad scientist experimenting on reviving the dead
- Ted Edwards as Buckley, a troubled man made mentally unstable by adrenaline
- Phyllis Diller as Mrs. Buckley, Buckley's wife who faces off against Maxwell
- Thea Ramsey as Alice Maxwell, Don's estranged wife and a showgirl
- Jenny Dark as Maizie, a showgirl and friend of Alice
- Marvel Andre as Marvel, another showgirl and friend of Alice
- Celia McCann as Jo, another showgirl and a friend of Alice
- John P. Wade as Embalmer
- Marian Blackton as Goof, Maxwell's cat-breeding neighbor who is suspicious of him (the neighbor is called "Goof" apparently)

Cast notes

- Several key cast members in the film are uncredited, most notably the cat-farming neighbor Goof, the detective, and Maria Altura, the woman whom Dr. Meirschultz brings back to life. The actress who doubled for Altura in the brief nude scene has also not been identified.
- Horace B. Carpenter was a producer, director and actor from the silent era who generally portrayed whitehaired characters in Westerns once sound emerged.
- This is the only film that Bill Woods performed in. He later became a makeup artist, working in film and television until 1968.
- Marian Blackton is sometimes reported, incorrectly, as appearing in male drag as the neighbor who catches and breeds cats. She plays a female neighbor who is questioned by the detective. The male actor who plays Goof has not been identified. Blackton was the sister of Maniac's assistant director and daughter of J. Stuart Blackton, founder of Vitagraph Studios and the father of American animation.
- The actress named Phyllis Diller in this film is of no relation to the comedian Phyllis Diller.

== Production ==
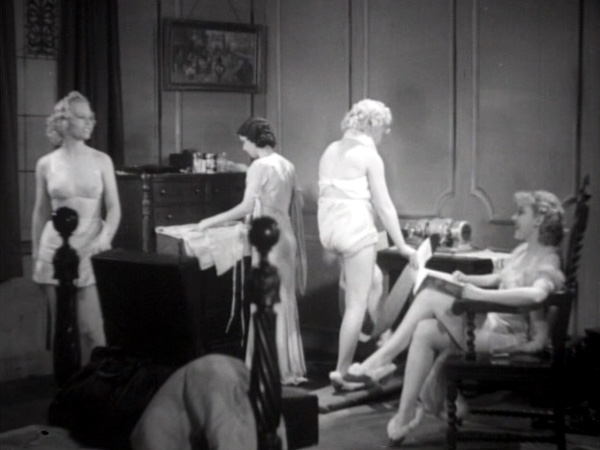
Typical of the exploitation films of Dwain Esper, Maniac contains gratuitous scenes of women lounging around in their lingerie.

Another poster

The film was shot on a minuscule budget of $7,500, according to the film's financier's son, and like many of director Dwain Esper's films was self-distributed on the exploitation roadshow circuit. After initial disappointing returns (and no reviews in the media of the time), the film was retitled Sex Maniac with great success. It became notorious for a scene in which one character strangles a cat and then eats its eyeball.

The footage that is superimposed over the scenes where the actor (having shot the mad scientist) is descending into madness, while bricking his victim inside a wall, originated from the 1922 Danish-Swedish film Häxan.

== Reception and legacy ==
It is considered by many film critics and historians to be one of the worst films of all time. Danny Peary believes that Maniac is the worst film made, Charlie Jane Anders of Gawker Media's io9 described it as "possibly the worst movie in history" and Chicago Tribune critic Michael Wilmington wrote that it may be the worst film he had seen, writing: "There are some voyages into ineptitude, like Dwain Esper's anti-classic Maniac, that defy all reason." Rotten Tomatoes placed Maniac on its list of movies "So Bad They're Unmissable", the Italian Vanity Fair included the film on its list of the 20 worst movies, and it is featured in The Official Razzie Movie Guide.

On Rotten Tomatoes, the film holds an approval rating of 89% based on 9 reviews, with a weighted average rating of 6.8/10. Many reviewers praise it as being "so bad it's good", such as Rob Gonsalves of eFilmCritic.com, who called it "A true trash masterpiece." Leonard Maltin awarded the film the lowest rating of BOMB, calling it "[a] Typically delirious Esper Schlockfest— filmed mostly in somebody's basement". Chicago Tribune critic Michael Wilmington, in a review for the 2005 horror film Chaos, wrote: "I wouldn't say Chaos is the worst movie I've ever seen. There are some voyages into ineptitude, like Dwain Esper's anti-classic Maniac, that defy all reason." A Rotten Tomatoes editorial by Michael Adams placed the film on a list of 25 movies so bad they're unmissable.

The film was first released on DVD by Kino Lorber in 1999 as part of the Dwain Esper Collection and again by Alpha Video on March 18, 2002.

It was also spoofed by RiffTrax on November 24, 2009.

== See also ==
- List of 20th century films considered the worst
- List of films in the public domain in the United States
- Nudity in film
- Reefer Madness (1936)
