= Elaine Barrie =

American actress (1915–2003)

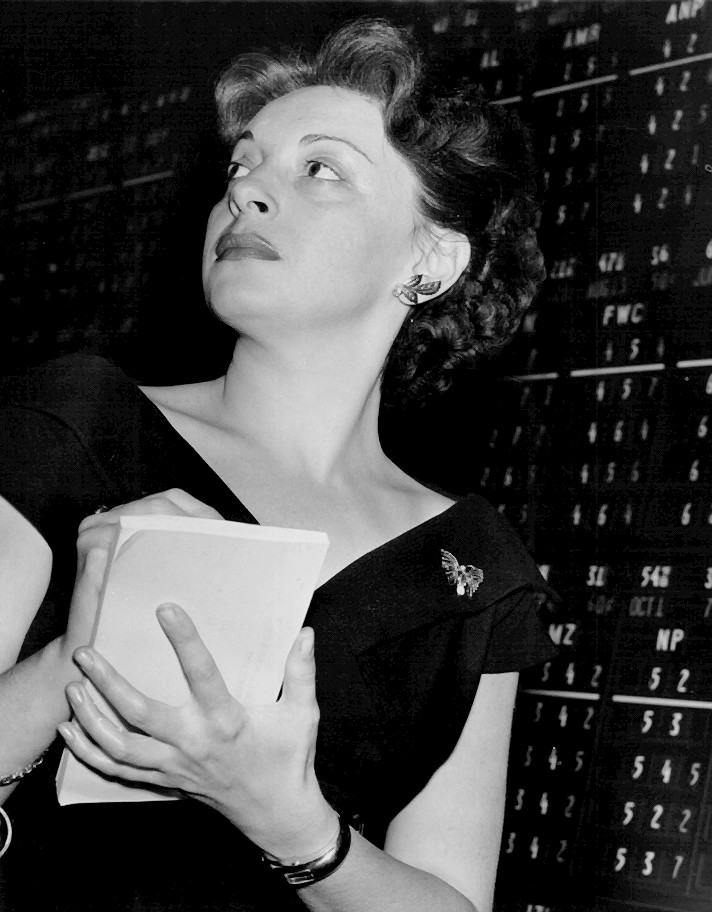
- Barrie at work in a Wall street brokerage in 1951
- Born: Elaine Jacobs; July 16, 1915; New York City, U.S.
- Died: March 1, 2003 (aged 87); New York City, U.S.
- Education: Hunter College
- Occupation: Actress
- Spouse: John Barrymore (m. 1936; div. 1940)

Elaine Barrie (née Jacobs; July 16, 1915 – March 1, 2003) was an American actress who appeared in several films and one Broadway play. She was the fourth, and last, wife of actor John Barrymore.

== Biography ==
Barrie was the daughter of a traveling salesman named Louis Jacobs. She claimed to have fallen in love with Barrymore at the age of 16, after seeing Svengali, and adopted the name 'Barrie' in tribute to her idol. As a 19-year-old sophomore at Hunter College, she visited his hospital room on the pretense of needing to interview a celebrity for a class assignment. They married in 1936 at Yuma, Arizona, but the marriage was a rocky one and they finally divorced in 1940. She later dated the actors Errol Flynn and Ray Milland.

In 1937, shortly before her final divorce, she was sued by E. K. Nadel to prevent her from appearing in Dwain Esper's How to Undress in Front of Your Husband, on the grounds that the title had been copyrighted by Sherill C. Coben.

She moved to Port-au-Prince, Haiti around 1958, and worked as a handbag designer. She lived in Haiti for an unknown number of years before returning to the United States.

Barrie died in New York City at the age of 87.

== Filmography ==
Year	Title	Role	Notes
1937	How to Undress in Front of Your Husband	Elanie	Short film, (credit as Elanie Barrie Barrymore)
1937	How to Take a Bath	unconfirmed	Short film
1939	Midnight	Simone	(final film role)
