= Joseph Seiden =

American film producer (1892–1974)

- יוסף זײדען
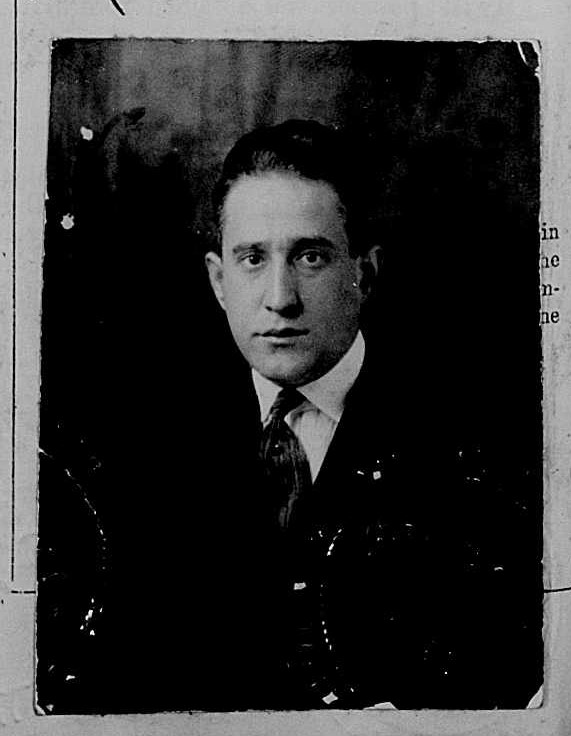
- Born: Josef Seiden; July 23, 1892; Lower East Side, Manhattan
- Died: January 1974; Nassau County, New York
- Notable work: Paradise in Harlem, God, Man and the Devil
- Parents: Frank Seiden (father); Rebecca Lack (mother)

Joseph Seiden (Yiddish: יוסף זײדען, 1892–1974) was a pioneering American Yiddish language film producer of the early twentieth century. He released a large number of low-budget, sentimental Yiddish dramas during the 1930s and 1940s. He also directed Paradise in Harlem, a 1940 musical film with an African American cast.

== Biography ==
=== Early life ===
Seiden was born on July 23, 1892, in Manhattan. His father, Frank Seiden, a Jewish entertainer born in Galicia, Austria-Hungary, was at that time a working magician who ran a bar in the Bowery. While Joseph was still a child, his father became one of the first Yiddish language recording artists in the United States, recording comedy and music records at the turn of the century.

=== Career in film ===
==== Projection and camera work ====
Seiden was present at the very dawn of the film industry in the New York area as he was a picture operator and voiceover actor at age 15 for the vaudeville and Nickelodeon theaters his family ran, starting in around 1907 with a theater in Greenpoint, Brooklyn and in 1914 the Willott Street Theater on the Lower East Side. The comedian George Burns worked in the Columbia street theater as a child and described it in his memoir as a noisy place where the adjacent Billiards hall often drowned out the act. By 1916 the family moved from running theatres to founding a production company, with Joseph and his brother Jacob being on the board of the Teeaness Film Co., and in 1918 his own company, Seiden Films, which made short educational or industrial films. Joseph soon became a successful cameraman, working for the New York Motion Picture Company, World Film Company, Equitable, and Fox Film.

Among his notable works during this era was his trip to Poland to film for Richard Ordynski and his Tatra Production Corporation in 1919, as film representative for Herbert Hoover and the American Relief Administration in Europe in the same year. He also continued to make industrial films in the United States, refounding his company in 1922 as the Seiden Industrial and Educational Film Corp. Associated.

Later in the 1920s Seiden continued to make money on the production and supply parts of the industry, running a company renting sound equipment for film production and another, the Seiden Camera Exchange, for film and photography equipment.

==== Producer ====
It was in 1929, after the release of the first Yiddish language film, Ad Mosay, released as The Eternal Prayer, that Seiden banded together with Moe Berliner and Moe Goldman to found Judea Pictures, which immediately produced two short films with budgets of around $3,000: Style and Class and Shuster Libe. The idea of a "Yiddish Talkie" was still such a novelty that contemporary newspapers debated whether it was commercially viable. After those saw some success, the company produced its first full-length film, Mayne Yidishe Mame starring Mae Simon. The company then launched into production for a long series of full-length, low-budget Yiddish "talkie" films. Seiden knew how to skirt regulations to save money and would often film at night or on holidays to avoid scrutiny. His first films were very poorly received by Yiddish cultural critics, but were nonetheless profitable enough to continue being made.

In 1930 Seiden tried to boost the international viewership of his films by securing a distribution deal in Mandatory Palestine. When attempts were made to screen Mayne Yidishe Mame at the Mograbi Theatre in Tel Aviv, members of the audience threw ink at the screen and set off stink bombs to protest the use of the Yiddish language (rather than Hebrew). The vice-mayor of Tel Aviv forbade the playing of the film, and then only allowed it with the sound cut off for the Yiddish dialogue and songs.

In 1931 Seiden took over full ownership of Judea Pictures, and then in 1935 founded a new company called Jewish Talking Pictures. The new company's first major work was a remake of Jacob Gordin's The Yiddish King Lear, which was directed by Harry Thomashefsky. By 1936, Joseph turned to artist and director George Roland, an experienced editor who had worked at Warner Brothers to produce his next round of films.

With the rise of the Nazi Party to power in Germany, Joseph became a vocal and active opponent. He produced an anti-Nazi film called Hitler's Reign of Terror (1934), directed by his longtime collaborator Michael Mindlin, and in 1938 denounced Leni Riefenstahl's tour to New York to promote Olympia.

By the end of the 1930s, although the market was saturated with far more Yiddish films than had existed a decade earlier, Joseph still thought he could make a profit by producing low-budget dramas. He rented a loft in Fort Lee, New Jersey to use as his new studio, and started off by filming Der Lebediker Yosem (The Living Orphan). He followed up with a number of similar formulaic films, including Kol Nidre (1939), Eli Eli, and Motl der Operator (1940). His final prewar film was Mazl Tov Yidn (1941), which was just a recut of various previous films he had made.

During the Second World War, Joseph ceased making Yiddish films and turned to wartime production (of collapsible masts).

It was only in 1949 that Joseph once again started making Yiddish films. In 1949 he set about to make an ambitious film, Jacob Gordin's Got, Mentsh un Tayvl (God, Man and Devil). Although his budget for actors and music was much higher than his prewar films, the film still suffered from primitive production and poor editing and was not well received. After adapting Abraham Blum's Dray Tekhter (Three Daughters), Joseph turned to less commercially risky productions, and made the musical revues Catskill Honeymoon, Singers of Israel and Monticello, Here We Come. After 1950, there was little market for Yiddish-language films and Joseph stopped trying to make new films.

After 'retiring' from filmmaking, Seiden turned to distribution and made his living that way, by renting out his own films and those of other Yiddish producers. Joseph died in Nassau County, New York in January 1974.

After his death, his collection of reels was sold by Joseph's son to Sharon Pucker Rivo and Miriam Krant, who used it as the basis to found the National Center for Jewish Film. The center has since restored and reissued a number of Joseph's films, including God, Man and Devil in 1978 Motel the Operator in 2001, The Living Orphan in 2004, and Kol Nidre in 2012. His 1949 film God, Man and Devil was also re-released on video in 1991.

== Selected filmography ==
- Yiddish Mama (מײַן ייִדישע מאַמע) (1930)
- Eli, Eli (193?) as producer and director.
- Hitler's Reign of Terror (1934), as supervisor, directed by Michael Mindlin.
- Living Orphan (Lebediker Yosem) (1937), as director and producer.
- Al khet (I have Sinned) (1937), as producer
- Der Yiddisher Nigun (the Jewish Melody) (19??), as producer and director.
- Jolly Paupers (פֿריילעכע קבצנים) (1937), as producer, directed by L. Feannick, script by Itzik Manger, produced in Poland.
- Kol Nidre (1939), as director, starring Leibele Waldman.
- Paradise in Harlem (1940)
- Motl the Operator (1940), as producer, based on a play by Chaim Towber.
- The Great Advisor (1940), as producer and director, starring Irving Jacobson.
- Mazel Tov Yidden (1941), as producer and director.
- American Matchmaker (אַמעריקאַנער שדכן) (1940), as producer, directed by Edgar G. Ulmer, starring Leo Fuchs.
- Three Daughters (19??), as director.
- God, Man and the Devil (1949–50) (גאָט, מענטש און טײַװל), as producer and director, script by Joseph Gordin.
