= Solomon the Wise =

1906 play by Jacob Gordin

Solomon the Wise (original Yiddish title Shloime Chuchem) is a 1906 play by Jacob Gordin, based on French sources, and loosely based on actual events in 17th century France, during the reign of Louis XIII and the ascendancy of Cardinal Richelieu.

Solomon Kaus, the title character, was an actual Jew who lived in Paris at that time, and believed he could build a machine that could run on water power; it is unclear whether he may have had an early idea along the lines of a steam engine or if he was simply pursuing an impossibility. He was, indeed, brought before Richelieu at one point for a hearing, and imprisoned among lunatics.

In the play, his invention is a success, but he is the subject of various intrigues; he is driven insane, and his heart gives out.

The title role was originally played by Jacob Adler. A contemporary critic in the New York Dramatic Mirror wrote of himself in the third person that "in all his years as a theatregoer he has seldom seen a histrionic exhibition equal to the performance of Jacob Adler as Solomon Kaus. In fact, the impersonation will remain imprinted on his mind with very few tragic portrayals he has seen. Until confined to the lunatic asylum Adler played the part as an intellectual dreamer... his dignity heightened by his emotional restraint... The culmination of the third act was infinitely more stupendous after this quiet, normal beginning... [O]ne could see the light of understanding fade from his eyes. Then came the delirium and the pity of it. Though the last act was enough to agonize the soul of an Egyptian sphinx, it was, artistically speaking, always within bounds."

In the third act, as Lulla Rosenfeld describes it in her commentary to Adler's memoir, Kaus "gives way to madness with the wild cry, 'Solomon Kaus now rides his fiery steed!' On this line Adler executed a leap that carried him to the brink, and almost over the brink, of the footlights. It never failed to bring a gasp from the audience, a moment of electrifying 'theater' in an otherwise realistic, albeit heightened, performance."
