= Marihuana (1936 film) =

1936 exploitation film directed by Dwain Esper

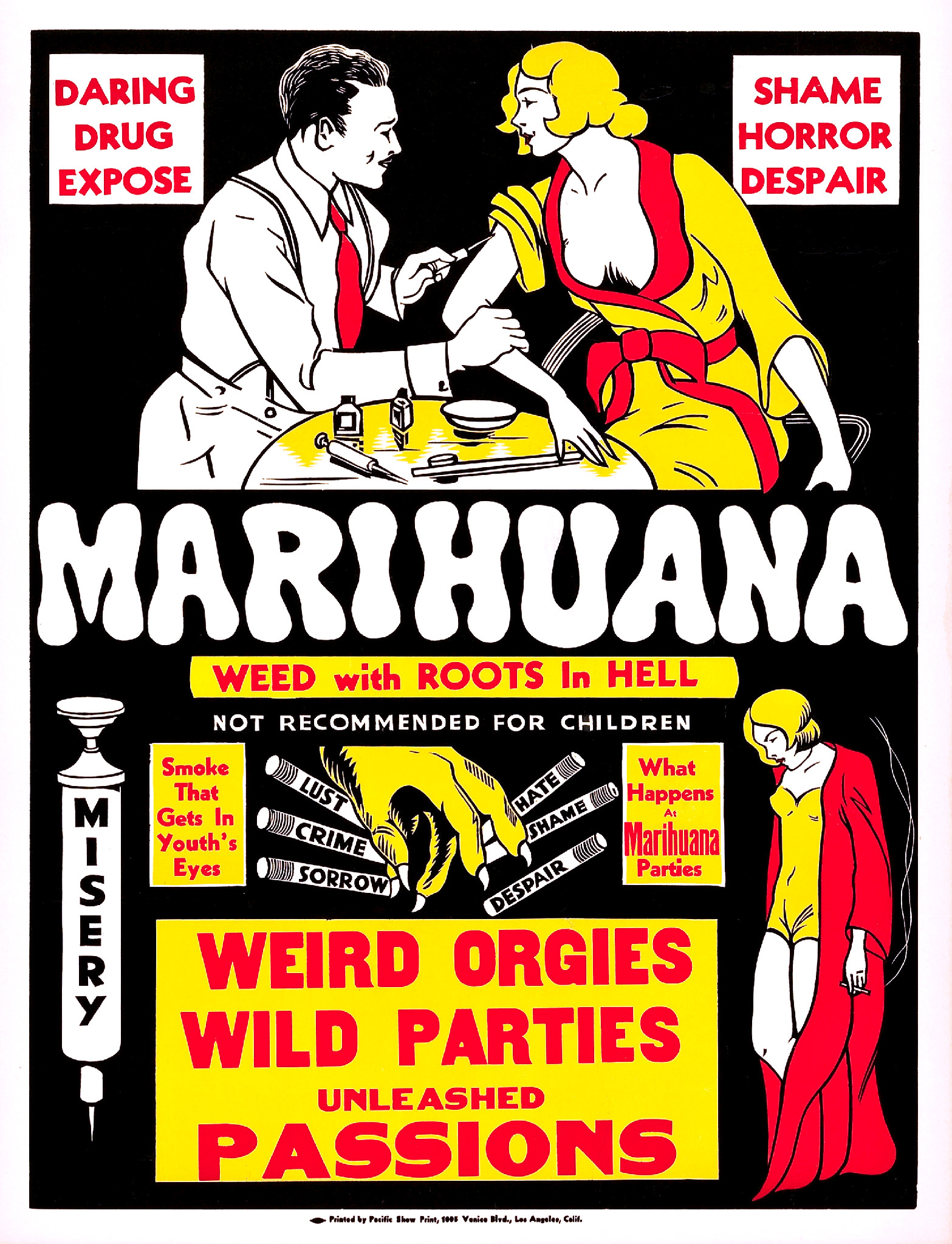
- Theatrical release poster
- Directed by: Dwain Esper
- Story by: Hildagarde Stadie
- Starring: Harley Wood; Hugh McArthur; Pat Carlyle; Paul Ellis; Dorothy Dehn; Richard Erskine; Juanita Fletcher; Hal Taggart; Gloria Browne
- Cinematography: Roland Price
- Edited by: Carl Himm
- Distributed by: Roadshow Attractions Inc.
- Release date: May 1936
- Running time: 57 minutes
- Country: United States
- Language: English
- Budget: $100,000

Marihuana is a 1936 exploitation film directed by Dwain Esper, and written by Esper's wife, Hildagarde Stadie.

== Plot ==
Marihuana (full film)

Burma is a confused girl who likes to party. One day she meets some strangers in a bar who invite her and her group to a party. At the party everybody drinks alcohol and the girls unknowingly smoke marijuana, which keeps them laughing. Burma and her boyfriend have sex on the beach while her friends go skinny-dipping.

One of the girls drowns at the skinny-dipping party and all her friends must keep the details of the party a secret. When Burma tells her boyfriend she's pregnant from their beach encounter, she pressures him to marry her. He says everything will be fine and turns to the strangers who threw the party for a job to support his family-to-be. The stranger, Tony Santello, gives him a job unloading smuggled drugs from a secret shipment to the docks. The police find out about this shipment, chase the smugglers, and shoot and kill Burma's boyfriend.

After Burma finds out about this news, she runs away from home, is forced to give her baby up for adoption, and becomes a drug dealer. She moves on to harder drugs, including injecting heroin. In the film's ending, Burma hatches a plan to kidnap and ransom her sister's adopted daughter for $50,000, then finds out that the child is actually her own. Stunned, and shortly after having injected herself with heroin, she collapses on the floor, as marijuana joints rain down around her.

== Cast ==
- Harley Wood as Burma Roberts / "Blondie"
- Hugh McArthur as Dick Collier
- Pat Carlyle as Tony Santello
- Paul Ellis as Nicholas Romero
- Dorothy Dehn as Elaine Roberts Stewart
- Richard Erskine as Morgan Stewart
- Juanita Fletcher as Mrs. Roberts
- Hal Taggart as Helen's husband
- Gloria Browne as Gloria Stewart

Uncredited

- Symona Boniface as Helen
- Marian Constance Blackton as Disapproving woman
- Horace B. Carpenter as Bartender

== Production ==
The film's screenwriter, Hildagarde Stadie, appears as an extra in the beginning of the film.

The original trailer showed a girl being brutally attacked, but this scene does not appear in the final film.

== Release ==
In 1938, Roadshow Attractions packaged Marihuana with the short film How to Undress in Front of Your Husband.

In an April 13, 1938, the poet Elizabeth Bishop details a Key West, Florida screening of Marihuana: "We have settled down to the summer session of banned movies — I went to 'Marihuana' last night. Several thousand Negroes, Cubans, and I, fought our way in, and then we were all very disappointed—even the two (2) thrills of the pre-view were not repeated, and the whole production was staged in what looked like a dentist's office (the 'lavish apartment of a dope-fiend'). The poor, wrecked 'high-school set' were all Hollywood matrons of at least 40, and at one point the corrupted darlings went for a nude swim—you saw little white specks way, way out in the ocean, then 'What's going on here?' and the bedraggled matrons were shown covering themselves with blankets, etc. Even from descriptions of marihuana, I thought there’d be some slow-motion work, at least."

== See also ==
- List of films in the public domain in the United States
- Reefer Madness
