= Paradise in Harlem =

- Directed by: Joseph Seiden
- Written by: Frank H. Wilson (story); Vincent Valentini (writer)
- Cinematography: Charles Levine; Don Malkames
- Music by: Lucky Millinder; Juanita Hall (uncredited)
- Release date: 1939
- Running time: 85 minutes
- Country: United States
- Language: English

Paradise in Harlem is a 1939 American musical comedy-drama film written by Frank H. Wilson and directed by Joseph Seiden. It was first shown in 1939 starring Frank H. Wilson. It was released by Jubilee Production Co.

== Premise ==
The story follows aspiring actor Lem Anderson in Harlem, who desires to act in a dramatic piece. Unfortunately for Lem, he is the witness of a crime and the mobster responsible forces him to leave town, where he becomes an alcoholic. Eventually he is drawn back to Harlem to get the chance to play Othello but is still on the hit list of a group of mobsters

== Cast ==
- Frank H. Wilson as Lem Anderson
- Mamie Smith as Madame Mamie
- Norman Astwood as Rough Jackson
- Edna Mae Harris as Doll Davis
- Merritt Smith as Ned Avery
- Francine Everett as Desdemona Jones
- Sidney Easton as Sneeze Ancrum
- Babe Matthews as Laura Lou
- Lionel Monagas as Matt Gilson
- Madeline Belt as Acme Delight
- Herman Green as Ganaway
- Percy Verwayen as Spanish
- George Williams as Runt
- Alec Lovejoy as Misery
- Lucky Millinder as himself - Bandleader
- Juanita Hall as Singer in Audience

== Production ==
This film was produced by Jubilee Pictures in 1939. Written by Frank L. Wilson and directed by Joseph Seiden. With cinematography by Charles Levine and Don Malkames, and screenplay by Vincent Valentini. And finally, music from Juanita Hall and Lucky Millinder

== Soundtrack ==
- Lucky Millinder with band & chorus - "I Gotta Put You Down" (Written by Lucky Millinder)
- Mamie Smith - "Lord, I Love that Man"
- Edna Mae Harris and Lucky Millinder - "Harlem Serenade" (Written by Vincent Valentini)
- Sidney Easton and Babe Matthews - "How D'You Figure I'll Miss You?"
- Mamie Smith and The Alphabetical Four - "Harlem Blues" (Written by Perry Bradford)
- Babe Matthews - "Why Am I so Blue?" (Written by Joe Thomas)
- Juanita Hall, Singers, Francine Everett, Frank C. Wilson and Babe Matthews - Gospel version of "Othello" (Written by Juanita Hall)
