= Reefer Madness =

1936 anti-cannabis film by Louis J. Gasnier

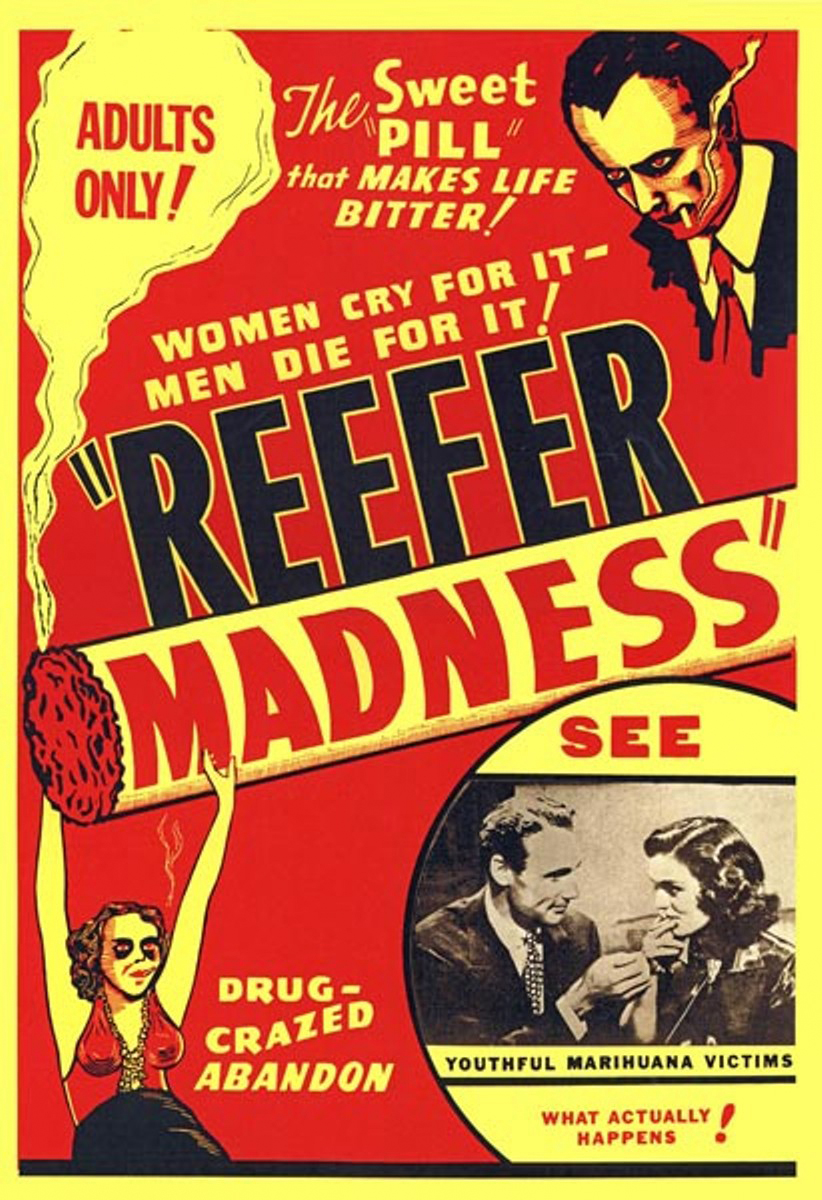
- Theatrical release poster
- Directed by: Louis J. Gasnier
- Screenplay by: Arthur Hoerl
- Story by: Lawrence Meade
- Produced by: George Hirliman (1936 film); Dwain Esper (1938–39 release)
- Starring: Dorothy Short; Kenneth Craig; Lillian Miles; Dave O'Brien; Thelma White; Warren McCollum; Carleton Young
- Cinematography: Jack Greenhalgh
- Edited by: Carl Pierson
- Music by: Abe Meyer
- Production companies: G&H Productions
- Distributed by: Motion Picture Ventures
- Release date: 1936
- Running time: 68 minutes
- Country: United States
- Language: English
- Budget: $100,000 (about $2,175,000 in 2024)
- Box office: $1,443,000 (1970 reissue)

Reefer Madness is a 1936 American public service announcement and exploitation film about drug use and abuse. It was originally titled Tell Your Children, and it has been known by the titles The Burning Question, Dope Addict, Doped Youth, and Love Madness as well.

In the film, aspiring high school students are enticed by pushers to try marijuana. They become addicted and engage in criminal activities such as a hit and run, manslaughter, murder, conspiracy to murder and attempted rape. They suffer hallucinations, descend into manic-depressive episodes and insanity, and associate with organized crime. One character commits suicide.

The film was produced in 1936 by mainstream independent filmmaker George Hirliman. It was financed by a church group and intended to be shown to parents as a morality tale about the dangers of cannabis use. Directed by silent-era pioneer Louis J. Gasnier, it featured a cast of mainly little-known actors. In 1938, exploitation film producer Dwain Esper purchased the film and recut it for distribution to exploitation houses, catering to vulgar interest while escaping censorship under the guise of moral guidance. Esper retitled the film Reefer Madness.

Reefer Madness was "rediscovered" in the early 1970s, and it became an underground hit on college campuses. It gained new life as an unintentional satire among advocates of cannabis policy reform. Critics have called it one of the worst films ever made, and it has gained a cult following within cannabis culture. It is in the public domain in the United States, due to the film carrying an improper copyright notice.

== Plot ==
Reefer Madness (1936)

Mae Coleman and Jack Perry are an unmarried couple who live together (in the jargon of the times, they live in sin) and sell marijuana. The unscrupulous Jack sells the drug to teenagers over Mae's objections; she would rather stick to an adult clientele. Ralph Wiley, a sociopathic college dropout turned dealer, and siren Blanche help Jack recruit new customers. Ralph and Jack lure high school student Bill Harper and college student Jimmy Lane to Mae and Jack's apartment. Jimmy takes Bill to a party where Jack runs out of reefer, and Jimmy, who has a car, drives him to pick up more. When they get to Jack's boss' "headquarters", Jimmy asks for a cigarette as Jack gets out and he gives him a joint. By the time Jack returns, Jimmy is unknowingly high; he drives away recklessly and hits a pedestrian. A few days later, Jack tells Jimmy that the man died of his injuries and agrees to keep Jimmy's name out of the case – if Jimmy will agree to "forget he was ever in Mae's apartment." As the police did not have enough specific details to track Jimmy down, he indeed escapes punishment.

Bill, whose once-pristine record at school has rapidly declined, has a fling with Blanche while high. Mary, Jimmy's sister and Bill's girlfriend, goes to Mae's apartment looking for Jimmy and accepts a joint from Ralph, thinking it's a regular cigarette. When she refuses Ralph's advances, he tries to rape her. Bill comes out of the bedroom and, still high, hallucinates that Mary is willingly offering herself to Ralph and attacks the latter. As the two are fighting, Jack knocks Bill unconscious with the butt of his gun, which inadvertently fires, killing Mary. Jack puts the gun in Bill's hand, framing him for Mary's death by claiming he blacked out. The dealers lie low for a while in Blanche's apartment while Bill's trial takes place. Over the objections of a skeptical juror, Bill is found guilty.

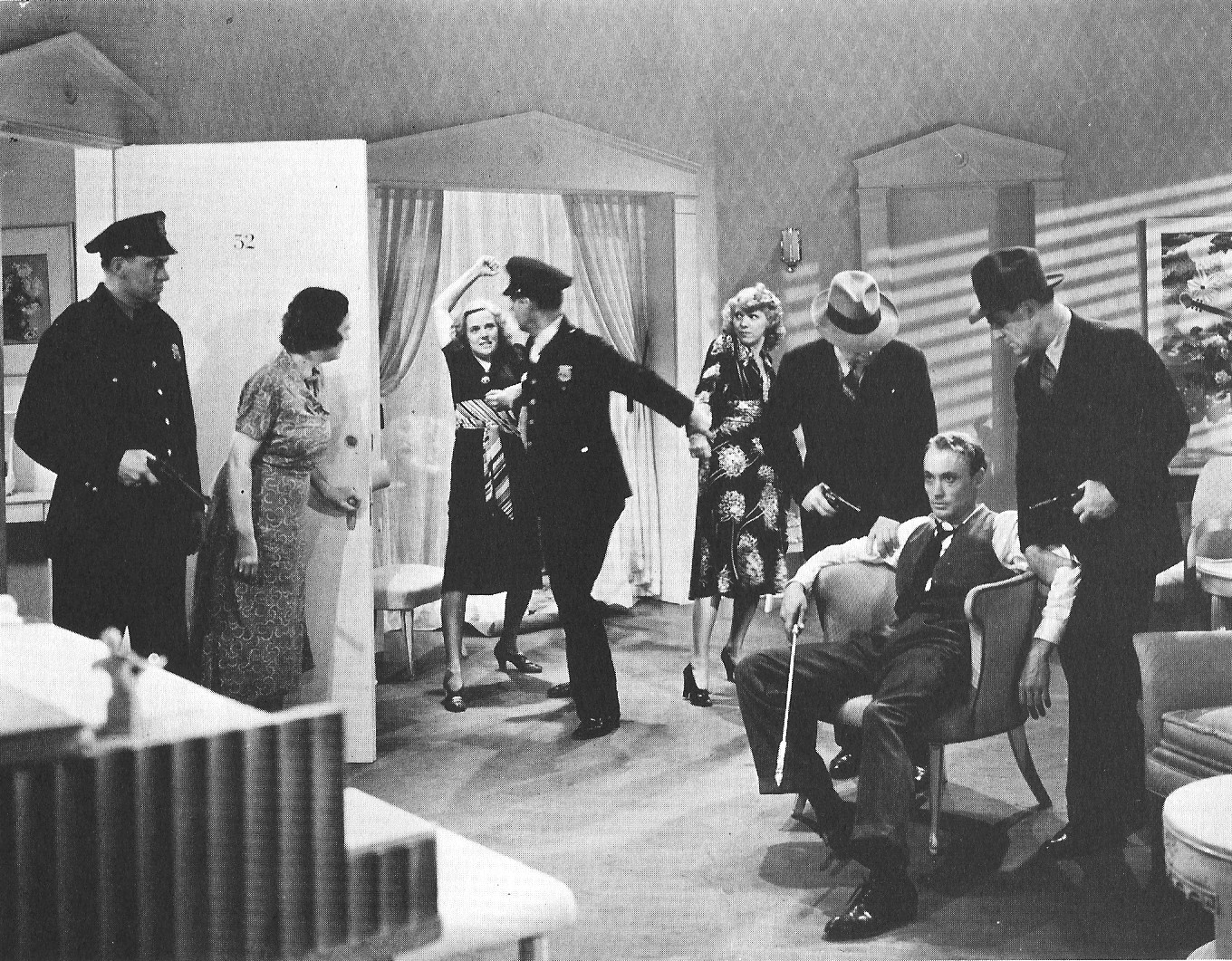
Ralph is arrested for Jack's murder.

By now Ralph is paranoid from both marijuana and his guilty conscience. Blanche is also high; she plays the piano at an increasingly rapid tempo as Ralph eggs her on. The boss tells Jack to shoot Ralph to prevent him from confessing, but when Jack arrives, Ralph immediately recognizes the threat and beats him to death with a stick as Blanche laughs uncontrollably in terror. The police arrest Ralph, Mae, and Blanche. Mae's confession leads to the boss and other gang members also being arrested. Blanche explains that Bill was innocent and agrees to serve as a material witness for the case against Ralph, but instead, she jumps out of a window and falls to her death, traumatized by her own adultery and its role in Mary's death. Bill's conviction is overturned, and Ralph, now nearly catatonic, is sent to an asylum for the criminally insane for the rest of his natural life.

The film's story is told in bracketing sequences, at a lecture given at a PTA meeting by high school principal Dr. Alfred Carroll. At the film's end, he tells the parents he has been told that events similar to those he has described are likely to happen again, then points to random parents in the audience and warns that "the next tragedy may be that of your daughter... or your son... or yours or yours..." before pointing straight at the camera and saying emphatically, "... or yours!" as the words "TELL YOUR CHILDREN" appear on the screen.

== Cast ==
- Dorothy Short as Mary Lane
- Kenneth Craig as Bill Harper
- Lillian Miles as Blanche
- Dave O'Brien as Ralph Wiley
- Thelma White as Mae Coleman
- Carleton Young as Jack Perry
- Warren McCollum as Jimmy Lane
- Pat Royale as Agnes
- Josef Forte as Dr. Alfred Carroll
- Harry Harvey Jr. as Junior Harper
- Richard Alexander as Pete Daly, Pusher (uncredited)
- Lester Dorr as Joe – Bartender (uncredited)
- Edward LeSaint as The Judge (uncredited)
- Forrest Taylor as Blanche's Lawyer (uncredited)

== Production and history ==
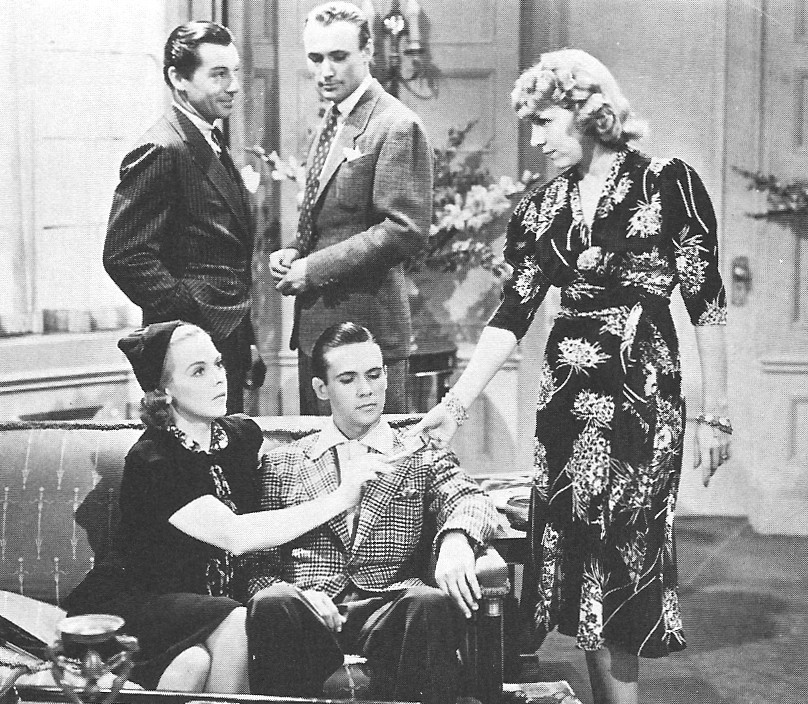
"If you want a good smoke, try one of these."

In 1936 or 1938, Tell Your Children was financed by a church group who intended that it be shown to parents to teach them about the supposed dangers of cannabis. It was originally produced by George Hirliman; however, some time after the film was made, it was purchased by exploitation film maker Dwain Esper, who inserted salacious shots. In 1938 or 1939, Esper began distributing it on the exploitation circuit where it was originally released in at least four territories, each with its own title: the first territory to screen it was the South, where it went by Tell Your Children (1938 or 1939). West of Denver, Colorado, the film was generally known as Doped Youth (1940). In New England, it was known as Reefer Madness (1940 or 1947), while in the Pennsylvania/West Virginia territory it was called The Burning Question (1940). The film was then screened all over the country during the 1940s under these various titles and Albert Dezel of Detroit eventually bought all rights in 1951 for use in roadshow screenings throughout the 1950s. Such education-exploitation films were common in the years following adoption of the stricter version of the Production Code in 1934. Other films included Esper's own earlier Marihuana (1936) and Elmer Clifton's Assassin of Youth (1937) and the subject of cannabis was particularly popular in the hysteria surrounding Anslinger's 1937 Marihuana Tax Act, a year after Reefer Madness.

== Preservation and copyright status ==
The concept of aftermarket films in film distribution had not yet been developed, especially for films that existed outside the confines of the studio system, and were therefore considered "forbidden fruit," not fit for mainstream exhibition. For this reason, neither Esper nor original producer George Hirliman bothered to protect the film's copyright; it thus had an improper copyright notice invalidating the copyright. More than 30 years later, in the spring of 1972, the founder of NORML, Keith Stroup, found a copy of the film in the Library of Congress archives and bought a print for $297. As part of a fundraising campaign, NORML showed Reefer Madness on college campuses up and down California, asking a $1 donation for admission and raising $16,000 (equivalent to $123,000 in 2025) toward support for the California Marijuana Initiative, a political group that sought to legalize marijuana in the 1972 fall elections. Robert Shaye of New Line Cinema eventually heard about the underground hit and went to see it at the Bleecker Street Cinema. He noticed the film carried an improper copyright notice and realized it was in the public domain. Seeking material for New Line's college circuit, he was able to obtain an original copy from a collector and began distributing the film nationally, "making a small fortune for New Line."

== Reception and legacy ==
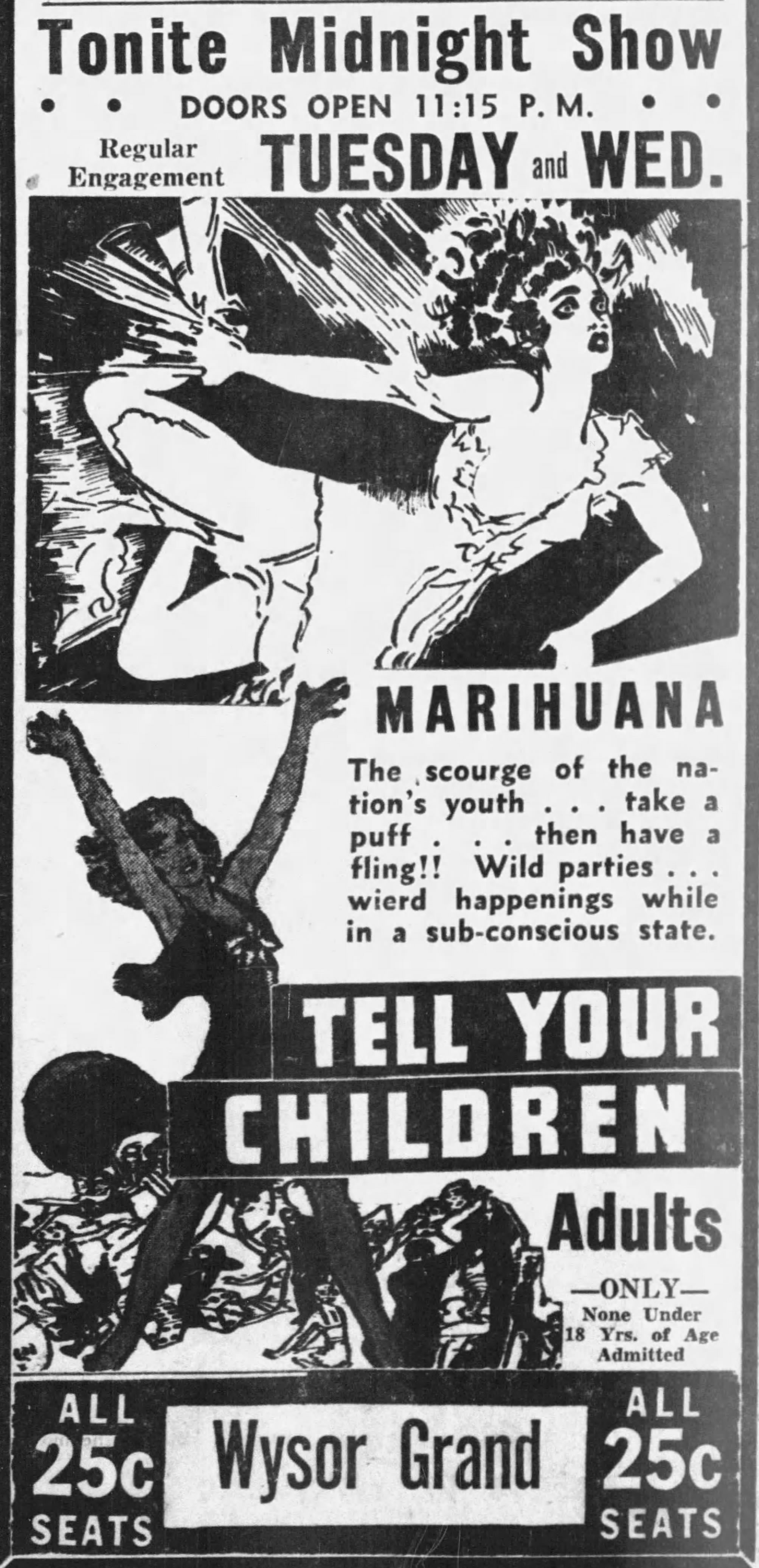
Theatrical advertisement from 1939

Reefer Madness developed a cult following after its revival in 1970's, when it was frequently shown as a midnight movie. Its melodramatic style and exaggerated performances have contributed to its reputation to as an example of camp cinema.

The review aggregation website Rotten Tomatoes reported a 39% approval rating with an average rating of 4.4/10 based on 28 reviews. Metacritic, on the other hand, assigned a score of 70 out of 100, based on 4 critics, which suggests "generally favorable reviews".

The Los Angeles Times has claimed that Reefer Madness was the first film that a generation embraced as "the worst." Leonard Maltin has called it "the granddaddy of all 'Worst' movies." Las Vegas CityLife named it the "worst ever" runner-up to Plan 9 from Outer Space.

=== Adaptations and parodies ===
The song "Reefer Madness" by space rock band Hawkwind is featured on their 1976 album Astounding Sounds, Amazing Music.

The song "Reefer Madness" by Australian rock band The Screaming Jets is featured on their self-titled 1995 album.

A 1992 stage adaptation by Sean Abley first opened in Chicago.

Clips from the film appear in the video for "Smoke the Sky", a song by American rock band Mötley Crüe from their self-titled 1994 album, with lyrics concerning marijuana use.

The movie appears in A Nightmare on Elm Street 4: The Dream Master, where it is screened in a movie theater.

The film was satirized in an eponymous 1998 stage musical, later adapted as a 2005 television movie musical featuring Alan Cumming, Kristen Bell, Christian Campbell, and Ana Gasteyer.

The video game L.A. Noire includes a case available as DLC titled "Reefer Madness", centered around LAPD Detective Cole Phelps investigating a conspiracy by Mexican pushers and a crooked factory owner to sell marijuana by hiding it in soup cans, before raiding the headquarters of the pushers' "boss" and busting the operation.

The interlude of the song "It Could Be Better" by singer Left at London features a sample of the movie.

== See also ==
- Cartoon All-Stars to the Rescue
- Cyber Seduction: His Secret Life
- Hemp for Victory
- How to Undress in Front of Your Husband
- List of cult films
- List of 20th century films considered the worst
- List of films in the public domain in the United States
- Perversion for Profit
- Sex Madness
