= Sex Madness =

1938 film by Dwain Esper

- DVD cover
- Directed by: Dwain Esper
- Written by: Joseph Seiden; Vincent Valentini
- Produced by: Dwain Esper
- Starring: Vivian McGill; Rose Tapley; Al Rigeli; Stanley Barton; Linda Lee Hill
- Release date: 1938
- Running time: 52 mins.
- Country: United States
- Language: English

Sex Madness (also known as Human Wreckage) is a 1938 American exploitation film directed by Dwain Esper. It is along the lines of Reefer Madness, supposedly to warn teenagers and young adults of the dangers of venereal diseases, specifically syphilis. The film stars Vivian McGill, Rose Tapley, Al Rigeli, Stanley Barton and Linda Lee Hill.

== Plot ==
Sex Madness

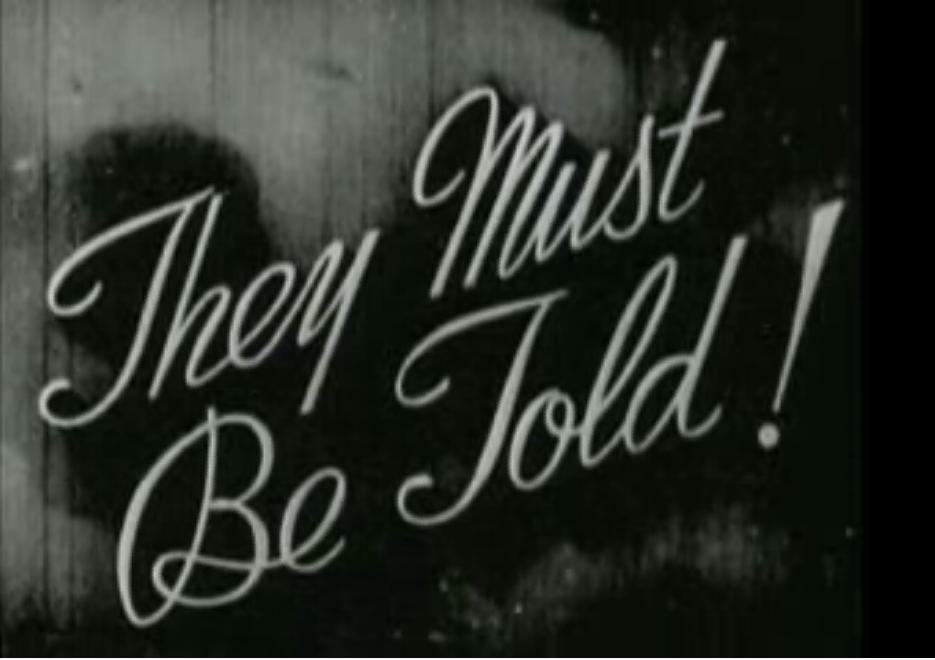
Opening shot of the film, with the tagline "They Must Be Told"

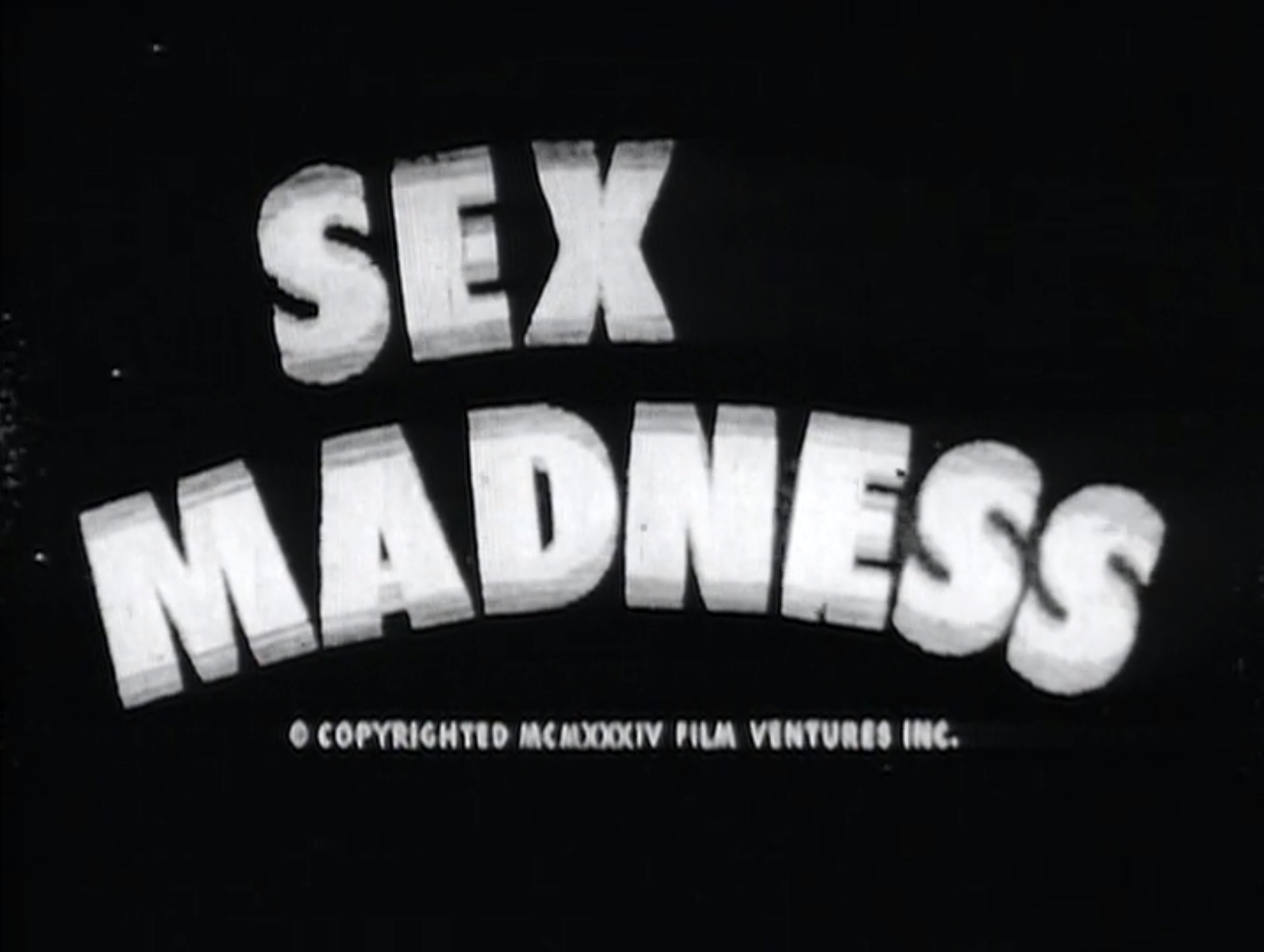
Sex Madness title card showing a copyright date of MCMXXXIV (1934).

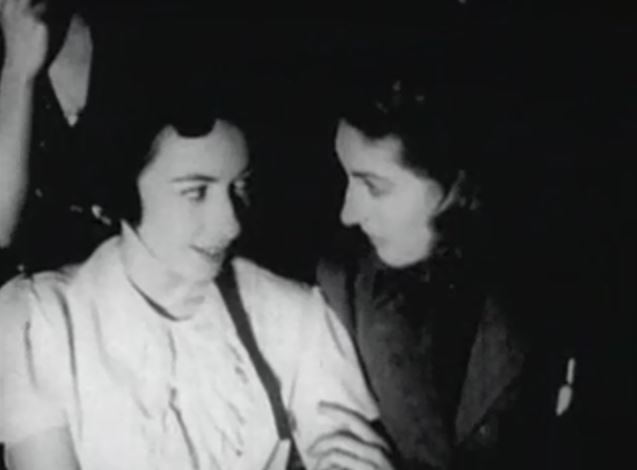
A subplot of the film with lesbianism that involves two secretaries, Peggy and the woman she is trying to seduce, Betty

This exploitation film belongs to the social guidance genre of quasi-documentary narratives, which exhort young adults to follow particular moral and social prescriptions related to sexuality and drug use.

The film centers on Paul Lorenz, a "concerned citizen" alarmed at the spread of venereal diseases such as syphilis and gonorrhea. However, at a New York City burlesque show, several protagonists are more intent on engagement in sexual pleasure, regardless of the subsequent costs. They include Paul's own son Tom, burlesque dancer Sheila Wayne (who has syphilis), and two secretaries, lesbian Peggy and Betty, whom she is trying to seduce.

However, one figure is not amongst them—Millicent Hamilton, a reformed former burlesque dancer. Millicent won a beauty contest in her hometown, which led her to New York, but she contracted syphilis after a "casting couch" sexual encounter. Millicent's physician, Dr. Hampton, tells her that her condition can be cured, but only after slow and painstaking treatment; she should reject quick "quack" pseudo-cures. She consents to this, eager to return to her hometown and marry her boyfriend Wendel, but will she heed the doctor's warnings? And what will the consequences be if she does not?

Wild parties, lesbianism, and premarital sex are portrayed or heavily implied in various scenes. The promotion of the film for "educational" purposes allowed it to portray taboo subjects that were otherwise forbidden by the Motion Picture Production Code of 1930, especially after those restrictions were strictly imposed on Hollywood productions after July 1934.

== Cast ==
- Vivian McGill as Millicent Hamilton
- Rose Tapley as Mrs. Hamilton
- Al Rigali as Mr. Hamilton
- Mark Daniels as Wendel Hope
- Linda Lee Hill as Sheila Wayne
- Ruth Edell as Mrs. Fay
- Charles Olcott as Paul Lorenz
- Ed Redding as Dr. Hampton
- Pat Lawrence as Tom Lorenz
- Allen Tower as Dr. Harris
- Richard Bengali as Mr. Maynard
- William Blake as Dr. Grenoble
- Frank Howsen as Dr. Bayard
- Allan Lee as Mr. Winthrop
- Jean Temple as Mrs. Winthrop
- Albert Patterson as James Winthrop
- Miriam Bilavsky as Jane
- Natalie Donet as Peggy
- Polly Bester as Betty

== Production ==
American film director and author Bret Wood argues in his book, Forbidden Fruit: The Golden Age of the Exploitation Film, that while Dwain Esper is often credited as the director of Sex Madness, he believes that Joseph Seiden is the more likely candidate, and further stated the Internet Movie Database still credits the wrong director on the film. Richard Whittaker of The Austin Chronicle also said there is "a mystery about who directed" the movie. He observed that it has been "attributed in many circles to Dwain Esper"; but without any actual credits included in the film, "it's hard to know definitively."

== Release ==
According to the Motion Picture Association and Production Code Administration records on file with the movie, the film was denied release by censorship boards in New York, Pennsylvania and Kansas.

In Ohio, the censorship board approved the film for release after removing scenes and dialogue they found objectionable. The content they removed included a scene in which "one girl strokes another's arms in a suggestive manner" and the dialogue that went with the scene: "You do have plenty of it". In addition, they rejected a close-up shot of "an exposed navel", and the "entire house party sequence."

== Reception ==
Author Tony Nourmand opined that Esper was "a shrewd salesman, who marketed this film as 'educational', thus giving his audience the opportunity to persuade themselves that rather than enjoying a steamy, titillating movie, they were widening their knowledge of an important social issue." Eddie Muller said "Esper created dingy, prurient imagery framed within scripts of fervid moral righteousness; the result was a head-spinning, hellfire-and-brimstone huckster’s stew, just like they served at a carnival geek show."

Professor and author Robert Eberweing observed that "the film is a chaotic mixture of peep show and preachment; and demonstrates most acutely the incompatibility of educational messages and sensationalized treatments of sex for entertainment; the production values of the film are so poor that a shot showing a victim with skin lesions and locomotor ataxia, is actually taken from an earlier silent film and clumsily spliced in as an impossible point-of-view shot."

Film critic Leonard Maltin did not mince words, saying it is "another trashy nugget from schlockmeister Esper, made on a budget of $5.00; in between the moralizing regarding 'the awful truth about social diseases', there are hints of lesbianism and pedophilia; indescribably, hilariously awful." Scott Campbell from Far Out Magazine wrote "attempting to frame itself as a documentary but quite clearly heavily indebted to propaganda more than anything else, it would be safe to say the film did not have the desired effect and swear its target demographic off the idea of wanton copulation."

== Legacy ==
In 2018, the film Sex Madness Revealed, directed by Tim Kirk, was released by Kino Lorber. The film features an audio commentary track over the original film, which features comedian Patton Oswalt and magician and actor Rob Zabrecky telling a fictitious history of the film. It premiered at the 2nd annual Overlook Film Festival, in New Orleans, Louisiana, in April 2018. The film was written by Kirk and Patrick Cooper. Bill Arceneaux from Film Threat opined "worth a chuckle here and there, Sex Madness Revealed starts clever and fun but ends painted into a corner of its own making." The film was released on Blu-ray in May 2019, with commentary by Kirk and Cooper about the making of the movie.

== See also ==
- Cult film
- Exploitation film
- List of American films of 1938
- List of LGBTQ-related films of the 1930s
- List of films in the public domain in the United States
