= Frank Seiden =

Professional entertainer (1860–1931)

Frank Seiden (Yiddish: אפרים זײדען, Efraim Zeyden) (July 20, 1860 – May 16, 1931), who sometimes went by the stage name Professor Seiden, was a professional magician, Badchen, vaudeville entertainer, barber, and Yiddish-language recording artist of the late 1800s and early 1900s. He recorded almost 200 Wax cylinder and 78-rpm releases for Columbia, Victor, and Berliner.

== Biography ==
Little is known about Seiden's early life. He was born Efraim Seiden in Galicia, Austria-Hungary on July 20, 1860. His parents were Jacob and Clara (Chaje) Seiden. He immigrated to the United States in 1877. His first decade there is poorly documented, but he married his wife Rachel in November 1883 and became a naturalized citizen in 1886. During the 1880s and 1890s he often worked as a barber, opening various shops on the Lower East Side on Ridge Street, Chrystie Street, and Willett Street.

By the late 1880s Frank was increasingly known as an entertainer and magician. It is unclear when he started performing magical acts, but an 1889 advertisement calls him the "Prof. Seiden, Austrian Prestidigitateur (the pupil of old Hermann)." Herrmann presumably refers to Alexander Herrmann, one of the first modern magicians, who was living in New York city and Boston during this era. It is unclear if they had any actual relationship.

Frank became known as a street magician, fire eater, Punch and Judy man, and ventriloquist. By the late 1880s, he was running a bar in the Bowery, and later another one in a Tenement building at 122 Attorney Street. He tutored Max Malini in magic and entertainment around 1887, who would go on to greater fame than Seiden. But at the time of his apprenticeship, Malini was often reduced to working in Seiden's restaurant or performing on street corners with him. Seiden is thought to have been present at the founding of the Society of American Magicians in New York in 1902.

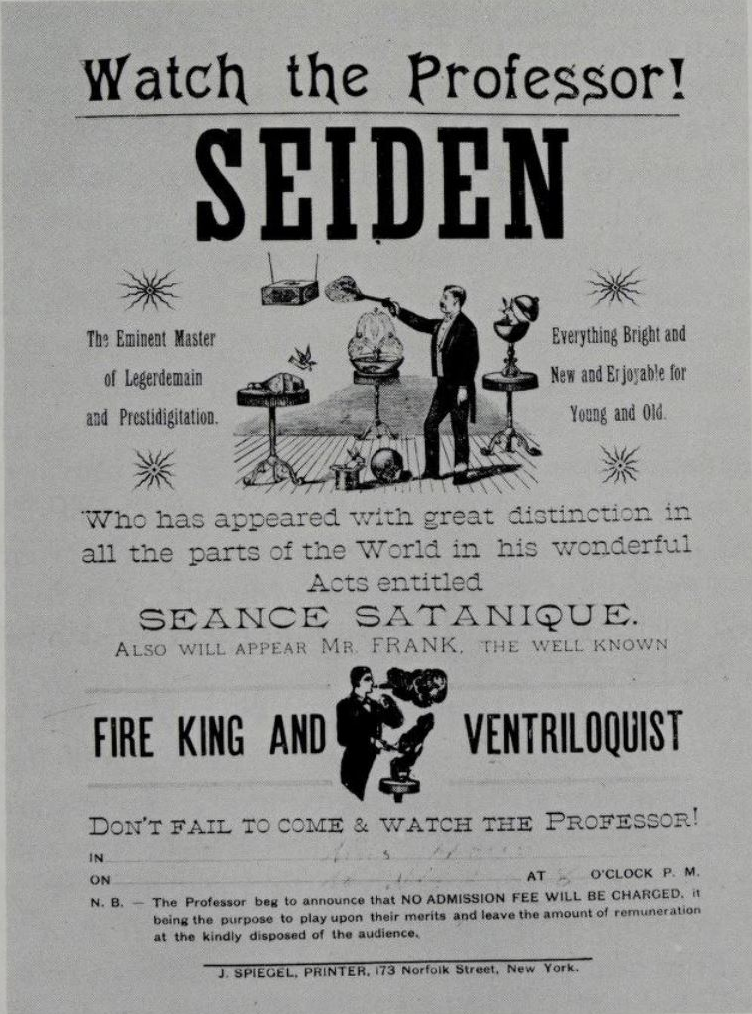
Professor Seiden poster c.1890

At the turn of the century Seiden became involved in the recording industry; in the 1900 census he listed his occupation as "phonograph dealer." In 1901 he made his first Wax cylinder recordings of Yiddish songs for Columbia, becoming one of the first Jewish recording artists in the United States, alongside William Dory, Solomon Smulewitz, and a handful of other pioneers. As technology evolved, he started recording discs for Columbia, Edison, and Victor, and by the middle of the decade had recorded more than two hundred. He was in the very first round of foreign language performers ever released by Columbia Records. His output consisted of folk songs, Yiddish Theatre songs, comic scenes, and religiously-themed content, often with basic piano accompaniment.

By 1905 Seiden had mostly moved on from music recording to running early Nickelodeon theaters. He applied his skills in vaudeville and singing to the new medium; he would start the film and sing along with the show. The comedian George Burns worked in Frank's theater at 66 Columbia street in around 1905 and described it in his memoir as a noisy place where the adjacent Billiards hall often drowned out the act. Burns described how Frank, Joe and Jacob would narrate the dialogue in the films, first in English and then again later in Yiddish. After 1910 the Seiden family relocated around the corner to the Willott Street Theater on the Lower East Side, which they ran until around 1915. He still performed during this time, as in the 1910 census he listed his occupation as vaudeville entertainer. Later in that decade, as his sons Jacob and Joseph became involved in silent film production (rather than mere exhibition), Frank had some involvement as a member of their production companies, such as Teeaness Film Co., founded in 1916.

By the 1920s Seiden may have retired from entertainment. He listed his occupation on the 1920 census as "none". He died at the Montefiore Hospital on May 16, 1931. He was buried at Mount Carmel Cemetery.

== Personal life ==
Seiden's wife Rachel (née Lack) was also born in Galicia. They were married in New York in 1883 and had a number of children including Jacob (born 1884), Eva (born 1886), Amalia (born 1888), Annie (born 1890), and Joseph (born 1891 or 1892). In 1893, while Seiden was on tour in New Jersey, an accident with fire in the family apartment caused the death of Annie, then three years old. Of his children, Joseph Seiden became the most well known for his work in the Yiddish-language film industry, first as a cameraman in the 1910s and then as a producer and director in the 1930s and 1940s. Joseph's older brother Jacob was also involved in the film industry in the 1910s and later.
