= Modern Motherhood =

1934 film by Dwain Esper

Modern Motherhood is an exploitation film by Dwain Esper. Originally released in 1934, it would gain fame by being presented in the style of later road show filmmakers such as Kroger Babb and David F. Friedman, as it was presented around the country and typically featured a "Dynamic Sex Lecture" at each performance.
