= The Worthless =

Play written by Jacob Mikhailovich Gordin

The Worthless (original Yiddish title דער מטורף, Der Meturef) is a 1908 play by Jacob Gordin, described by Lulla Rosenfeld as "a study of provincial bigotry and fear", whose central character Ben Zion Garber is "a man of genius lost and misunderstood in an environment that ultimately destroys him".

== Story ==
Ben Zion is the son of a rich, illiterate factory owner in Soroka, a small factory town in Ukraine. Rejecting the dishonesty he sees as tied up in the world of business, he is secretly in love with Lisa Rosenberg, daughter of the owner of a rival (failing) factory, who is engaged to be married to Ben Zion's coarse older brother. She almost elopes with Ben Zion, but finds him too childishly idealistic, too much a dreamer. Throughout the whole play, even after her marriage, she is torn between the two brothers.

After the marriage, Ben Zion quarrels with his father and goes to live with his poor uncle Yisrol Yakob and his wife. He published scientific observations in an Odessa newspaper, becomes a watchmaker, and is working on a perpetual motion machine. It is rumored that he is an atheist or in league with the Devil. At one point he intervenes to stop a husband from beating his wife, and is beaten in turn by both. He protests the mistreatment of children in a Jewish school, exposes unhygienic conditions in factories, including his father's. He ignores warnings that he is making dangerous enemies.

Toward the end of Act II, he is on the verge of completing his perpetual motion machine, when Lisa comes as an emissary from his mother, to tell him that his father is gravely ill. Their dialogue makes it clear that they are still in love, but that happiness is no longer possible for either of them. At one point, Ben Zion says to her "Shakespeare's Ophelia drowns herself. This Ophelia marries my brother," to which Lisa replies, "She drowned in clear pure water and died only once, while this Ophelia dies every day in the filthy mire of a swamp."

While they are talking, a fanatical townsman comes and destroys Ben Zion's machine.

Act III begins with the father, apparently dying, refusing to see a doctor. As Ben Zion enters, suitcase in hand, the older brother is demanding that he produce a will, to avoid Ben Zion receiving an equal part of his fortune. Ben Zion says he plans to leave the town. It becomes clear that his brother consented in the destruction of the machine. After asking his father's forgiveness, he opens the suitcase, revealing a gun, and shoots himself in the heart.

The father tries, in vain, to tell the dying Ben Zion that there is, indeed, a will, and that his fortune was to be shared equally by the two sons. The play ends with the brother terrified that he will be blamed by all for driving Ben Zion to suicide, and with Lisa declaring that she has loved Ben Zion all along and that the others "killed him with their fear of the truth".

The roles of Ben Zion and Lisa Rosenberg were originally played by Jacob and Sara Adler.
