= Vincent Valentini =

American screenwriter

Vincent Valentini (died 1948) was a screenwriter in the United States. He wrote the musical score for The American Red Cross Nurse. He wrote the 1928 theatrical production Parisiana.

An advertisement for the 1946 film Beale Street Mama includes the notation "Hit tunes by Vincent Valentini".

== Filmography ==
- The Convict's Code (1930)
- Sex Madness (1938), co-wrote
- Paradise in Harlem (1939), from a story by Frank H. Wilson
- Sunday Sinners (1940), from a story by Frank H. Wilson
- Murder on Lenox Avenue (1941), co-wrote with Bryna Ivens
- Beale Street Mama (1946), wrote music
- Boy! What a Girl! (1946)
- Stars on Parade (1946)
- Sepia Cinderella (1947)
- Miracle in Harlem (1948), story and screenplay
