= Christian Literature Society of Japan =

Japanese religious literature publisher

Christian Literature Society of Japan (CLSJ; 1913–1933) was a publisher of religious literature in Tokyo, serving as the official organ of the Federated Missions in Japan. The Committee on Christian Literature of the Conference of Federated Missions was established in 1912. Its outgrowth was the CLSJ, the name change occurring in January 1913. The CLSJ rendered a service for Japan much the same as similar societies that had been organized previously in India and China.

== Predecessor organizations ==
In the 19th-century, the best work in Christian literature in Japan had been effected by the regularly organized tract and literature societies. Those with headquarters abroad, in the U.S. and Great Britain were also helpful. Among these were the Society for Promoting Christian Knowledge, whose catalogue included Japanese editions of the Prayer Book, commentaries on books of the Bible, and volumes on the creeds and offices of the Church. There were also works, devotional, theological, historical and philosophical, translated from standard authors abroad. The American Tract Society began to promote Christian literature in Japan as early as 1874. The Religious Tract Society began work as early as 1837. It was the chief supporter of the Japan Book and Tract Society. Among the institutions which were cooperative in character and had their headquarters in Japan, the oldest was the Japan Book and Tract Society. The American Tract Society, which began work in the country in 1874. The Religious Tract Society planned its organized work in Japan in 1874 and established the Tokyo corresponding committee in the following year. On May 1, 1891, the work of the three committees was united under the Tract Societies' Committee for Japan, of which Rev. W. J. White was agent. In 1898, the designation of the committee was changed to "The Japan Book and Tract Society". The report of 1913 referred to a falling off in the sale of this society's own books, because increasingly, missionaries were finding it more convenient to have much of the literature they used printed locally, especially tracts. The Japanese YMCA Union issued occasional books on religious and Biblical subjects, and dealt with the question of purity and of physical development, especially with a view to helping young men.

== Establishment ==
As none of these institutions were in a position to meet the demands for literature, the Conference of Federated Missions in Japan appointed a Committee on Christian Literature to consider mainly the formation of some permanent organization, in cooperation with the Japanese, to make more adequate provision for producing and distributing Christian literature. After three years of work by this committee, which included Professor Frank Müller, the Conference in 1911 resolved to appoint a Permanent Committee, (1) to report to the Japanese Church Federation on the proposed organization and to consult with it on finances and plans; (2) to invite the Japanese Church Federation to arrange for a Permanent Committee of nine of its members to co-operate with nine from the Conference of Federated Missions; (3) to ask the Japanese Church Federation to provide funds to support a Japanese man to give his whole time to this work in cooperation with a foreigner.

The Japanese Church Federation was not finally organized until December 1911, so that it could not enter into the full plans from the first, especially in view of the financial responsibility. Five Japanese, however, were appointed to serve on the committee in an advisory capacity. This committee held its first meeting on January 5, 1912, and decided to make a systematic digest of the religious press of Japan, and to compile and publish a comprehensive catalogue of Christian books in Japanese. On July 21, 1912, the Rev. S. H. Wainright, D.D. (Methodist Episcopal Church, South), was appointed executive secretary of the Permanent Committee, his salary being fully paid by his own mission.

It was proposed to form the Christian Literature Society of Japan, the object of which was to be the production and circulation of Christian literature suited to the needs of both Christian and non-Christian Japanese. Representing the Federated Christian Missions in Japan, the society was to be correspondingly catholic in spirit, and neither its members nor those supporting it were to be regarded as necessarily holding all the views presented in the books issued.

At the Conference of Federated Missions held in January 1913 the proposals of the Permanent Committee were adopted, and the new organization definitely named The Christian Literature Society of Japan, not "for Japan" as was the case of the corresponding societies organized for China and India. Arrangements were made for organizing its finances. It was resolved to approach the missions and boards represented in the conference for appropriations of money, on the basis of £1 per member (counting men and women) in their respective stations in Japan. Provision was made for individuals to join as associate members for £1 per annum or as life members for £20.

== Kyobunkwan ==
The CLSJ was located in the Methodist Publishing House (MPH). The MPH was also known by its Japanese name as Kyobunkwan. The CLSJ used the MPH facility to publish and distribute its literature.

In addition to housing the CLSJ, the Kyobunkwan engaged in publishing, retailing, and printing its own publications of Christian literature in English and in Japanese. It was established to ensure a plentiful supply of Christian books for Japan and Korea. In addition to religious books, the Kyobunkwan stocked imported books on various subjects. It held a large stock of English language books of every sort as well as British, American, and German periodicals. There was a wide selection of stationery and desk supplies, as well as Waterman and Swan fountain pens, Underwood typewriters and Victor phonographs and records. It also carried on a large foreign mail order business for individual customers. The company's goal was to conduct a business along Christian lines and to be a clearing house for Christian workers in Japan.

Kyobunkwan is still extant as of 2026.

== History ==
It had for its aim not undenominational, but an interdenominational venture. It sought to encourage the promulgation of the ideas embodied in the literature of the Protestant denominational bodies represented in Japan, though, as a matter of course, strict sectarianism was to be avoided.

Its initial tasks in 1913 were:

1. A review of the religious press.
2. An investigation and cataloguing of the existing Christian literature in the vernacular.
3. The formation of a collection of Christian books in the vernacular.
4. The distribution of English books among Japanese pastors, contributed by authors and friends abroad.
5. The organization of a department of Christian news.
6. A comprehensive programme-including twelve series of books to form The Christian Library. These could be either translations or original productions.

By 1914, the catalogue of existing Christian literature in the vernacular had been completed. It contained a list of about 2,000 publications, upon which the following notes were made:

- A large number of these publications had been issued by Christian writers, and dealt with a variety of subjects.
- Almost the entire list was composed of works brief in compass and low in price.
- Of the Christian writings listed, about equal proportions were translations of foreign works, and original writings produced in Japan.
- The outstanding need in the field was the production of substantial writings or translations in Japanese in which Christian subjects received full and adequate treatment.

It appeared from the report in the Christian Movement that the society published its own works, the printing being done chiefly by the Fukuin Press, which had taken over the printing department of the Methodist Missions. The Methodist Publishing House acted as sales' agent. The sore need of facilities for distribution led to the appointment of Dr. E. N. Walne, of the Southern Baptist Convention, to organize this department. During its first year, the society issued about two million pages of new literature. It could not do more without a capital fund providing about £50 to £200 for each publication.

The output of the CLSJ in 1915 was treble that of the previous year, and the circulation of its publications increased five-fold.

It published nearly 32,000,000 pages of Christian literature in 1916. By 1917, it was probably the most closely unionized Christian organization in Japan.

By 1928, the CLSJ had become the successor to the Methodist Publishing House (Kyobunkwan).

== Distribution ==
There were already self-supporting Christian bookshops in the large cities, and many non-Christian stores had been persuaded to carry a limited stock of Christian literature.
