= How to Undress in Front of Your Husband =

- Theatrical release poster
- Directed by: Dwain Esper
- Screenplay by: Hildagarde Stadie
- Starring: Elaine Barrie; Trixie Friganza; Hal Richardson
- Narrated by: Albert Van Antwerp
- Cinematography: Roland Price
- Music by: Herb Eicke
- Release date: 1937
- Running time: 14 minutes
- Country: United States
- Language: English

How to Undress in Front of Your Husband is a 1937 short comedic film directed by Dwain Esper.

== Synopsis ==
In an opening narrative, the filmmaker explains that many of man's pleasures (such as beer and cigarettes) have been made safer and more enjoyable through technology, but that no such improvement has been made for women. The film thus strives to teach women how to please their husbands in the bedroom.

The film is shot through the eyes of a peeping Tom paparazzo, who leeringly takes lurid shots of celebrities in the privacy of their own homes. Two examples of his work are given: Elaine Barrymore, who serves as the example of how to undress properly, and Trixie Friganza, vaudeville and opera star in one of her later starring roles, as the example of how not to undress, as each comes home from a party. Elaine demonstrates natural seduction skills and grace in her slow, methodical undress, which the narrator surmises is how she landed her husband John, the "world's greatest lover." Trixie, on the other hand, is shown as irritated and slovenly as she tersely yanks off her garments and throws them on the ground.

At the end of the film, as the paparazzo develops his pictures, his wife angrily calls her husband to dinner.

== Cast ==
- Elaine Barrie as herself
- Trixie Friganza as herself
- Hal Richardson as Peeping Tom

== Production ==
The film humorously censors itself by blocking a revealing scene in which the narrator deadpans: "and that man's here again." However, the release was not without controversy. A copyright infringement suit was filed against Elaine Barrie and Dwain Esper, claiming that E.K. Nadel had exclusive rights to the title. John Barrymore and his family were angered by Barrie's appearance in the film and the portrayal of their marriage. Although the Barrymores reconciled, they divorced permanently in 1940.

== In other media ==
Canadian experimental filmmaker Gerda Cammaer spoofed this film with additional narration by Lindsay Fitzgerald in her 2019 film Undressing Sexism.

== See also ==
- Sex Madness
- Fat shaming
- Sexism
