= Di shkhita =

1899 play by Jacob Gordin

Di shkhita was an 1899 Yiddish play by Jacob Gordin. The title refers to the Kosher slaughter of animals, and has been variously rendered in English as The Butchery or The Slaughter. The play is a protest against arranged marriage.

The central character—played in the original production by Keni Liptzin—is a young woman, married off to a butcher with a mistress and three grown children by a previous marriage. Her overbearing husband drives her mad; in the play's climax, she murders him with the ritual slaughter knife.
