= God, Man and Devil (Got, mentsh un tayvl) =

Yiddish film

- גאָט, מענטש און טײַװל
- Directed by: Joseph Seiden
- Based on: Got, Mentsh un Tayvl by Jacob Gordin
- Produced by: Joseph Seiden
- Starring: Michal Michalesko; Gustav Berger; Berta Gersten; Shifra Lehrer
- Release date: January 21, 1950
- Country: United States
- Language: Yiddish

God, Man and Devil (Yiddish: גאָט, מענטש און טײַװל) is a 1950 Yiddish-language film directed and produced by Joseph Seiden, based on Jacob Gordin's 1900 play of the same name. The film was the last Yiddish feature film released in the U.S. after World War II. It stars Michal Michalesko as Hershele Dubrovner, Gustav Berger as Satan, Berta Gersten as Pesa, and Shifra Lehrer as Freyde.

== Background ==
The underlying play, Got, Mentsh un Tayvl (1900), draws loosely on the Faust legend: a poor, pious scribe named Hershele Dubrovner is tempted by the Devil, disguised as a benefactor named Uriel Mazik, to abandon his modest life for wealth and a talis factory, at the cost of his soul and his marriage.

The play, along with Mirele Efros, is considered among Gordin's most successful works and helped establish him as, in the words of the Cambridge History of English and American Literature, "the acknowledged reformer of the Yiddish stage". It premiered at the Thalia Theatre in New York on September 21, 1900, and became a classic of the Yiddish repertoire.

== Cast ==
- Michal Michalesko – Hershele Dubrovner
- Gustav Berger – Satan
- Berta Gersten – Pesa
- Esta Saltzman – Tsipa
- Max Bozyk – Leyzer Badkhn (Hershele's father)
- Leon Schachter – Khatskl Drakhme
- Lucy Gehrman – Dobe
- Shifra Lehrer – Freyde
- Joshua Zeldis – Motl

== See also ==
- Yiddish cinema
- Jacob Gordin
