= Dwain Esper =

American film director

- Born: October 7, 1894; Snohomish, Washington, U.S.
- Died: October 18, 1982 (aged 88); San Diego, California, U.S.
- Occupation(s): Filmmaker, producer
- Spouse: Hildagarde Stadie (m. 1920)
- Children: 2

Dwain Atkins Esper (October 7, 1894 – October 18, 1982) was an American director and producer of exploitation films.

== Biography ==
Dwain Esper was born in Snohomish, Washington. He was a veteran of World War I.

== Career ==
Esper worked as a building contractor before switching to the film business in the mid-1920s. He produced and directed inexpensive pictures including Sex Maniac, Marihuana, and How to Undress in Front of Your Husband. To enhance the appeal of these low-budget features, he included scenes containing gratuitous nudity and violence that led some to label him the "father of modern exploitation."

Esper's wife, Hildagarde Stadie, wrote many of the scripts for his films. They employed extravagant promotional techniques that included exhibiting the mummified body of notorious Oklahoma outlaw Elmer McCurdy before it was acquired by Dan Sonney.

== Maniac (1934) ==
Maniac, also known as Sex Maniac, an exploitation/horror film directed by Esper, is a loose adaptation of the Edgar Allan Poe story "The Black Cat" and follows a vaudeville impersonator who becomes an assistant to a mad scientist.

== Personal life ==
Esper's wife was Hildagarde Stadie, born 14 July 1895, Chicago, Illinois, died: 21 July 1993, Bullhead City, Arizona, also known as: Mollie Hildagarde, Hildagarde Stadie, Hildagarde Stadie Jackson, and Hildagarde Stadie Esper.

Esper died in San Diego, California at the age of 88. He and Hildagarde had two children.

== Filmography ==
=== Director credits ===
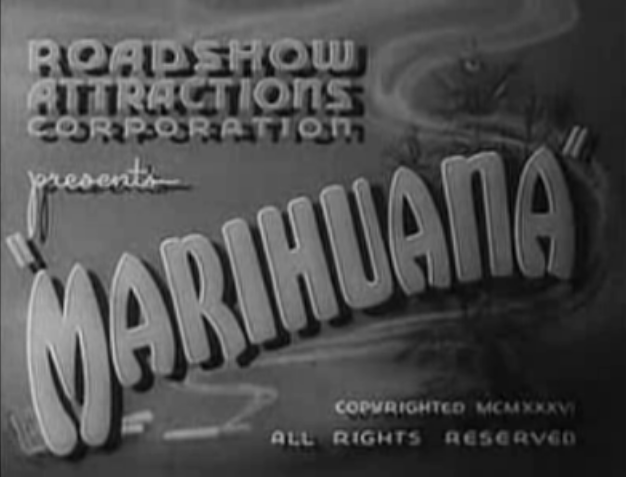
Marihuana: The Devil's Weed, 1936 opening title

- Sinister Harvest (1930)
- The Seventh Commandment (1932)

a.k.a. Sins of Love (US: reissue title)
a.k.a. The 7th Commandment (US: poster title)

- Narcotic (1933)

a.k.a. Narcotic Racket (US: reissue title)
a.k.a. Narcotic! (US: promotional title)
a.k.a. Narcotic: As Interpreted by Dwain Esper (US: closing credits title)

- Maniac (1934)

a.k.a. Sex Maniac

- Modern Motherhood (1934)
- Marihuana (1936)

a.k.a. Marihuana, the Devil's Weed
a.k.a. Marihuana, the Weed with Roots in Hell!

- How to Undress in Front of Your Husband (1937)
- Sex Madness (1938)

a.k.a. Human Wreckage (US: reissue title)
a.k.a. They Must Be Told (US: reissue title)

- Curse of the Ubangi (1946)
- Will It Happen Again? (1948)

a.k.a. Love Life of Adolph Hitler (US: reissue title)
a.k.a. The Strange Love Life of Adolf Hitler (US: reissue title)
a.k.a. The Strange Loves of Adolf Hitler (US: reissue title)

=== Producer credits ===
Excluding films Esper directed.

- How to Take a Bath (1937)
- Angkor (1935)

a.k.a. Beyond Shanghai (UK)
a.k.a. Forbidden Adventure (US: informal reissue title)
a.k.a. Forbidden Adventure in Angkor (US: reissue title, 1937)

==== Reissues ====
- Reefer Madness
- Hell-a-Vision

a.k.a. Hell-o-Vision (US)

- Man's Way with Women
- Freaks (uncredited) as Forbidden Love, and later Natures Mistakes with Sam Alexander providing a live appearance with some disfigured members of his 'troupe'
- Cain: Aventures des mers exotiques

a.k.a. Cain
