= The Yiddish King Lear =

1892 play

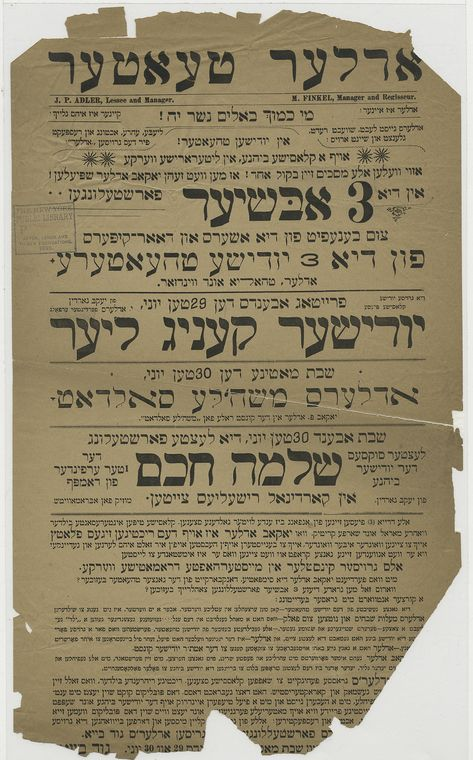
Poster for an 1898 production of The Yiddish King Lear starring Jacob Adler.

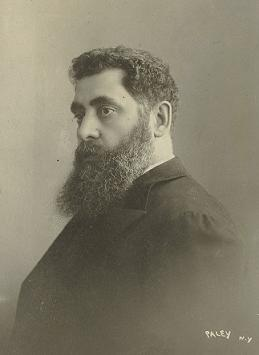
Jacob Gordin, the writer of The Yiddish King Lear

The Yiddish King Lear (Yiddish: דער ייִדישער קעניג ליר, romanized: Der Yidisher Kenig Lir, also known as The Jewish King Lear) was an 1892 play by Jacob Gordin, and is generally seen as ushering in the first great era of Yiddish theater in New York City's Yiddish Theater District, in which serious drama gained prominence over operetta. Gordin, a respected intellectual and Yiddish-language novelist, had been recruited by Jacob Adler in an effort to create a more serious repertoire for Yiddish theater, comparable to what he knew from Russian theater. His first two plays, Siberia and Two Worlds had failed commercially, although Siberia was later successfully revived. The Yiddish King Lear was, along with Gordin's play Mirele Efros, one of the first "to explore the gap between traditional parents and modern children that was to preoccupy the later Yiddish stage and even the American-Jewish theater."

The play is not a translation of William Shakespeare's King Lear, but the title is an acknowledgement of the roots of the plot. Gordin's play is set in Vilna (Vilnius, Lithuania), in 1890. It begins at the Purim feast given by David Moishele, a wealthy Russian Jewish merchant – a personification of what Adler referred to as the "Grand Jew", surrounded by family, friends, servants: in effect, a monarch in his court. As he divides his empire, the story of Shakespeare's Lear is recounted to him as a warning by the virtuous daughter who denied his authority by becoming a student in St. Petersburg. He is destined to follow in the same path to ruin and madness; unlike Shakespeare's Lear (but quite like the way Lear was often staged from the English Restoration well into the 19th century), there is a relatively happy ending, with differences set right and David Moishele living to forgive and be reconciled with his children.

The husbands of the daughters among whom David Moishele divides his "kingdom" are, respectively a Hasid, an Orthodox Jewish businessman, and an apikoyres, or secular Jew.

The title role became a pillar of Adler's image and career. Theater Magazine wrote of Adler's performance in a 1901 revival of The Yiddish King Lear, "No finer acting has ever been seen in New York than Adler's gradual transition from the high estate of the Hebrew father distributing his bounty in the opening scenes to the quavering blind beggar of later developments." Even after he was nearly paralyzed by a stroke in 1920, Adler managed to play Act I of The Yiddish King Lear on several occasions as part of a benefit performance, since his character remained seated throughout this act; he played the role for the last time in 1924, two years before his death.

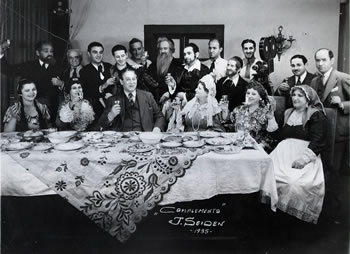
The Yiddish King Lear (1934)

The play was made into a 1934 Yiddish-language film with a new score by veteran Yiddish theatre composer Joseph Brody. The play continues to be revived often, and there have been several recent English-language translations and adaptations. In 2018, David Serero played Moishele in his own English adaptation, featuring Yiddish songs of the era, at the Orensanz Foundation in New York and recorded the first cast album of the play
