= Jacob Gordin =

American dramatist (1853–1909)

Jacob Mikhailovich Gordin
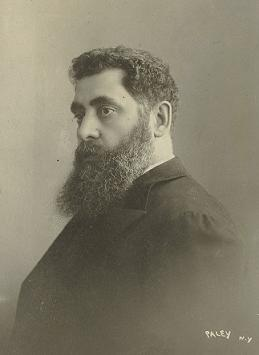
- Gordin c. 1895
- Born: Jacob Michailovitch Gordin; 1 May 1853; Mirgorod, Russian Empire
- Died: 11 June 1909 (aged 56); Brooklyn, New York, U.S.

Jacob Michailovitch Gordin (Yiddish: יעקב מיכאַילאָװיטש גאָרדין; May 1, 1853 – June 11, 1909) was a Russian-American playwright active in the early years of Yiddish theater. He is known for introducing realism and naturalism into Yiddish theater.

The Cambridge History of English and American Literature characterizes him as "the acknowledged reformer of the Yiddish stage." At the time of his rise, professional Yiddish theater was still dominated by the spirit of the early (1886–1888) plays of its founder, Abraham Goldfaden, which derived in no small measure from Purim plays, often spectacles more than dramas; Goldfaden's later works were generally operettas on more serious subjects, perhaps edifying, but not naturalistic. Again quoting the Cambridge History, after his 1892 arrival in New York City, "Gordin took the Yiddish drama in America from the realm of the preposterous and put a living soul into it," bringing it up to the level of "realistic melodrama." J. Hoberman describes Gordin as "epitomiz[ing] Yiddish theater during the period of its greatest popularity" and notes that he wrote over 70 plays in his lifetime.

== Life and career ==
Gordin was born in Mirgorod in the Russian Empire (present-day Ukraine), and received a liberal though irregular education at home. He was recognized as a reformer and a Russian writer. He had also been a farmer, a journalist, a shipyard worker in Odessa, and, reportedly, an actor.

He migrated to New York in July 1891, and tried to make a living writing for Russian-language newspapers and the Yiddish socialist Arbayter tsaytung (the precursor to the Forverts, The Forward), but his acquaintanceship with the noted Jewish actors Jacob Adler and Sigmund Mogulesko prompted him to try his hand at play-writing.

His first play, Siberia, was based on a true story about a man sent as a prisoner to Siberia and who escaped, lived out a normal life for many years, and was then exiled again. Although initially it met a rocky reception (as did his second play, Two Worlds), it was a critical success. His third play The Pogrom in Russia was produced in January 1892 by the actor Boris Thomashefsky. In June 1892, Gordin signed a contract with Jacob Adler, and later that year, for Adler and his troupe, he wrote Der yidisher kenig lir (The Jewish King Lear), loosely adapted from Shakespeare and the Russian writer Ivan Turgenev's King Lear of the Steppes, and set in 19th-century Russia. It laid the foundation of his career as a Yiddish playwright. The play drew a new audience of Russian-Jewish intellectuals to the Yiddish theater and constituted a defining moment in Adler's career as well as Gordin's. It is widely seen as ushering in the first "Golden Age" of Yiddish theater in New York.

To some extent he had to compromise his modernist vision with the theatrical conventions of the time. As in the plays of Goldfaden, Moses Horowitz (Hurvitz), and Joseph Lateiner, dancing and songs unrelated to the plot still occupied a prominent part in the play, but Gordin's plots were naturalistic and the characters were living persons. Under the influence of his plays, Jewish actors began to regard their profession as one that calls for study and an earnest attitude.

Gordin is noted more for bringing naturalism and realism into the Yiddish theater than as an intrinsically great dramatist. Again quoting the Cambridge History, "With all the realism of his situations, with all the genuineness of his characters, he was rather a producer of plays for a particular theatrical troupe than a writer of drama. That his comic characters generally stand in organic relation to the play is one of his chief merits. Of his many pieces (about 70 or 80) only a score or so have been published." They single out as some of his best Mirele Efros, Got, Mentsh un Tayvl (God, Man, and Devil, based on Goethe's Faust), and Der Umbakanter (The Unknown).

== Partial list of works ==
Some of these plays may have earlier dates than indicated: it is possible that sources are referring to publication dates or revivals.

- Siberia, 1891
- Der pogrom in rusland (The Pogrom in Russia), 1892
- Tsvey veltn, oder Der groyser sotsialist (Two Worlds, or The Great Socialist). According to B. Gorin, 1892; according to Z. Zylbercweig, 1896
- Der yidisher kenig lir (The Jewish King Lear), 1892
- Der vilder mentsh (The Wild Man), 1893
- Captain Dreyfus; Pogrom, Late 1890s
- "Di litvishe brider lurie" (The Lurie Brothers from Lithuania), 1894
- Zelig itzik, der fidler, free adaptation of Schiller's Intrigue and Love (Kabal und Liebe)
- "Der folks faynd" (An Enemy of the People), an adaptation from Henrik Ibsen, 1896
- Medea: a historishe tragedye, adapted from Franz Grillparzer, no later than 1897
- Mirele Efros, oder di yidishe kenigin lir (Mirele Efros or the Jewish Queen Lear), 1898
- Di shkhite (The Slaughter — the title refers to ritual slaughter, in accord with Kosher laws), 1899
- Shloime khokhem (Solomon the Wise, Solomon Kaus), 1899-1900
- Di shvue (The Oath), 1900
- Got, mentsh un tayvl (God, Man, and Devil), 1900
- Safo (Sappho), 1900
- Der momzer (The Bastard), a reworking of Victor Hugo's Lucrezia de Borgia, 1901
- Di makht fun finsternish, translation of The Power of Darkness by Leo Tolstoy 1902; Gorin lists as 1905
- Di Kreytser sonata (The Kreutzer Sonata), 1902
- Khasye di yesoyme (Khasia the orphan), 1903
- Der emes or Die varhayt (The Truth), 1903
- Ta'ares-hamishpokhe (Family Purity), 1904
- Di emese kraft (The True Power), 1904
- Tkhies-hameysim (Resurrection), adapted from the Tolstoy novel, 1904
- Elisha Ben Abuyah, 1906
- Der unbekanter (The Stranger), 1905
- Der meturef (The Worthless), 1905
- Der fremder (The Foreigner), 1906
- On a heym (Homeless), 1907
- Di sheyne Miryam, no later than 1908
- Dementia Americana, 1908
- Dovid'l meshoyrer (David the Choir Singer), 1907
- Gots shtrof (God's Punishment)
