= Pioneers of African-American Cinema =

2015 anthology collection of independent Black cinema

- Directed by: Pearl Bowser, Ebony Film Corporation, Zora Neale Hurston, Solomon Sir Jones, Richard C. Kahn, Lincoln Motion Picture Company, Richard Maurice, Oscar Micheaux, Richard Norman, Spencer Williams Jr.
- Produced by: Library of Congress, with the cooperation of the British Film Institute, George Eastman Museum, Museum of Modern Art, National Archives, National Museum of African American History and Culture, Southern Methodist University, and the UCLA Film & Television Archive
- Music by: Alloy Orchestra, Makia Matsumura, Max Roach, Donald Sosin, DJ Spooky, Samuel Waymon
- Distributed by: Kino Lorber
- Release date: 2015
- Running time: 25hr 12min.
- Country: United States
- Language: English

Pioneers of African-American Cinema is a 2015 digitally restored anthology collection of independent Black cinema from the first half of the 20th century.

== About ==
Known as "race films," this category of film was made outside of the Hollywood system, and is notable for its exploration of issues of "class, gender, and politics within the Black community." The most important of these filmmakers was Oscar Micheaux, whose films Within Our Gates (1920), with "its head-on confrontation of racism and lynching, The Symbol of the Unconquered (1920), about black homesteaders struggling for survival against the Ku Klux Klan on the Midwestern plains," and Body and Soul (1925), featuring Paul Robeson's film debut as an escaped prisoner, are all included. Directors Spencer Williams, Richard Maurice, writer and ethnographer Zora Neale Hurston, and filmmaking couple James and Eloyce Gist are all represented, too, however, as are a variety of selections from the Ebony Film Corporation, work by Solomon Sir Jones and more.

The complete runtime of the entire anthology is more than 25 hours, and the restoration is of particular significance to scholars, historians, and film aficionados due to its inclusion of formerly inaccessible footage. The restoration includes over 12 feature films, including Hell-Bound Train, Within Our Gates, Birthright, and The Flying Ace. It also includes shorts, fragments, trailers, documentary footage, archival interviews and audio recordings. For greater historical context, some films are presented in pairs, including Hot Biskits and The Blood of Jesus and Verdict Not Guilty and Heaven-Bound Travelers. Musical accompaniment includes compositions by DJ Spooky, Max Roach, Alloy Orchestra, Samuel Waymon, Makia Matsumura, Donald Sosin and others.

Funded in part by a Kickstarter campaign, the series was produced in association with the Library of Congress, with the cooperation of the British Film Institute, George Eastman Museum, Museum of Modern Art, National Archives, National Museum of African American History and Culture, Southern Methodist University, and the UCLA Film & Television Archive. Curated by scholars Charles Musser and Jacqueline Stewart, the anthology was distributed by Kino Lorber, which specializes in historic arthouse film.

The anthology box set is available for streaming and purchase on Blu-Ray and on DVD, the latter of which is accompanied by a 76-page booklet. J. Hoberman, in a review for The New York Times, has praised the collection and recommended it for educational institutions.

== Anthology contents ==
Film title	Director	Year	Duration	Music	Notes
Two Knights of Vaudeville	Ebony Film Co.	1915	11 min.	Donald Sosin	
Mercy, the Mummy Mumbled	Ebony Film Co.	1918	12 min.	Alloy Orchestra	(Blu-Ray only)
A Reckless Rover	Ebony Film Co.	1918	14 min.	Donald Sosin	
Within Our Gates	Oscar Micheaux	1920	73 min.	Paul D. Miller (DJ Spooky)	
The Symbol of the Unconquered	Oscar Micheaux	1920	59 min.	Max Roach	
By Right of Birth	Lincoln Motion Picture Co.	1921	4 min.	Donald Sosin	
Body and Soul	Oscar Micheaux	1925	93 min.	Paul D. Miller (DJ Spooky)	
Screen Snapshots	Micheaux footage	1920	1 minute		Bonus: An Introduction (7 min.); Bonus: The Films of Oscar Micheaux (8 min.)
Regeneration	Richard E. Norman	1923	11 min.	Donald Sosin	
The Flying Ace	Richard E. Norman	1928	65 min.	Mont Alto Motion Picture Orchestra	
Ten Nights in a Bar Room	CPFC	1926	64 min..	Donald Sosin	
Rev. S.S. Jones Home Movies	Rev. Solomon Sir Jones	1924-26	16 min.	Andrew Simpson	
The Scar of Shame	Frank Peregini	1929	86 min.	Makia Matsumura	Bonus: The Color Line (5 min.) Bonus: Ten Nights in a Bar Room – An Introduction (4 min.) Bonus: About the Restoration (8 min.)
Eleven P.M.	Richard Maurice	1928	60 min.	Rob Gal	
Hell-Bound Train	James and Eloyce Gist	1930	50 min.	Samuel D. Waymon	Restored by S. Torriano Berry.
Verdict Not Guilty	James and Eloyce Gist	1934	8 min.	Samuel D. Waymon	Restored by S. Torriano Berry.
Heaven-Bound Travelers	James and Eloyce Gist	1935	15 min.	Samuel D. Waymon	Restored by S. Torriano Berry. (BLU-RAY ONLY)
The Darktown Revue	Oscar Micheaux	1931	18 min.		
The Exile	Oscar Micheaux	1931	78 min.		
Hot Biskits	Spencer Williams	1931	10 min.		
The Girl from Chicago	Oscar Micheaux	1932	70 min.		
Ten min. to Live	Oscar Micheaux	1932	58 min.		
Veiled Aristocrats	Oscar Micheaux	1932	48 min.		
Birthright	Oscar Micheaux	1938	73 min.		Bonus: Veiled Aristocrats Trailer (4 min.) Bonus: Birthright Trailer (4 min.) Bonus: We Work Again (BLU-RAY ONLY) – WPA Documentary (1937, 15 min.)
The Bronze Buckaroo	Richard Kahn	1939	58 min.		
Zora Neale Hurston Fieldwork Footage (excerpt)	Zora Neale Hurston	1928	3 min.		
Commandment Keeper Church, Beaufort South Carolina, May 1940 (excerpt)	Zora Neale Hurston	1940	15 min.		
The Blood of Jesus	Spencer Williams	1941	56 min.		
Dirty Gertie from Harlem U.S.A.	Spencer Williams	1946	60 min.		
Moses Sisters Interview	Pearl Bowser	1978	32 min.		Bonus: Texas Tyler Promo Film with Ossie Davis (1985, 6 min.) Bonus: The Films of Zora Neale Hurston (2 min.) Bonus: The Films of Spencer Williams (7 min.) Bonus: The End of an Era (4 min.)

== See also ==
- African American cinema
- Black women in the silent film era
- Black women filmmakers
- Race film
