= Black women filmmakers =

Black women filmmakers have made contributions throughout the history of film. According to Nsenga Burton, writer for The Root, "the film industry remains overwhelmingly white and male." In 2020, 74.6 percent of movie directors of theatrical films were white, showing a small decrease from the previous year. In terms of representation, 25.4 percent of film directors were of ethnic minority in 2020. Of the 25.4 percent of minority filmmakers, a small percentage was female.

Around 30 percent of film makers are women, and approximately 7 percent of all film makers in the film industry are African-American. Many of the dramas by black women film makers have portrayed subjects such as racism and misogyny. Television programs, and films such as I May Destroy You, Daughters of the Dust, and Middle of Nowhere are a few examples of audio/visual media that have portrayed issues centering Black women in the US and elsewhere.

Since the early 1900s black women have used film to portray the real-life problems faced by women in the African-American community.

== History of Black women as filmmakers ==
Five African-American women filmmakers helped establish the US cinema industry and better the representation of African-Americans on film. A few of the first black women filmmakers were Eloyce King Patrick Gist, Zora Neale Hurston, Tressie Souders and Maria P. Williams, and Madame E. Touissant, who produced, directed, or wrote films in the early 1900s. Souders wrote, directed and produced a feature film called A Woman's Error in 1922.

Jacqueline Bobo establishes that black women filmmakers have been productive throughout the twentieth century. Gloria J. Gibson-Hudson's essay title "The Ties That Bind: Cinematic Representations By Black Women Filmmakers" notes that these black women have developed a framework or "commonalities" that evolved from social and historical circumstances.

Black women have produced and directed films during the prolific interim of Black film production from 1910 through the 1920s. Archivist and film scholar Pearl Bowser notes that Black women worked behind the camera on numerous films during this time on what were known as race films, that is, independent films produced by Black filmmakers, rather than white-controlled films about Black life. Historical records show that black women were especially noteworthy in film making during the 1900s.

=== 1970s ===
The accomplishments in film and television that followed in the 1970s widely consisted of a string of Black women directors, such as Julie Dash (Daughters of the Dust), Alile Sharon Larkin, Fronza Woods, and Jacqueline Shearer (Eyes on the Prize). Throughout the 70s Alile Sharon Larkin had two films come out. The Kitchen filmmaker Alile Sharon Larkin visualizes a mental ward as a possible equivalent to prison incarceration for women of color and also Your Children Come Back to You.

Larkin's film looks at a mother, a child, a better life on the horizon, and a bond that cannot be broken. In Killing Time, Woods ironically reflects on the absurdity of existence through the story of a suicidal woman. On the other hand, in Fannie's Film, she expresses the hopes, aspirations and inner feelings of a domestic worker. Jacqueline (Jackie) Sharer was an independent producer and director of documentaries about African Americans. Her films included Minor Quarrel.

=== 1980s ===
Kathleen Collins (1942-1988) was an author, teacher, scholar, and filmmaker. Her film, Losing Ground, about a strained marriage between a teacher and her husband, a painter, was one of the first feature films directed by a Black woman. Jessie Maple is known for Twice as Nice (1989). Maple was the first African-American woman to join the International Group of Film and Television Photographers. Euzhan Palcy (born January 13, 1958) is a director, screenwriter and producer from Martinique. Her films explore themes of race, gender, and politics, focusing on the enduring effects of colonialism. Palcy's first film, Sugar Cane Alley (1983), received numerous awards, including the César Award for Best First Feature. In 1989, she directed A Dry White Season (1989), becoming the first black female director to have a film produced by a Hollywood studio.

=== 1990s ===
In the 1990s, black filmmakers started to break through into all-white Hollywood. In the 1990s, black film creators started showing representation in front and behind the camera. In 1991, Julie Dash became the first African-American female filmmaker to have a full-length general theatrical release in the US for her film Daughters of the Dust. The film was recognized in 1999 by the 25th annual Newark Black Film Festival as one of the most important cinematic achievements in black cinema in the 20th century. Daughters of the Dust was placed on the National Film Registry by the Library of Congress in 2004, making it one of 400 other American-made films that are preserved and protected as national treasures. In 1996 Cheryl Dunye's The Watermelon Woman became the first film directed and written by a Black lesbian to explore Black lesbianism. Dunye's work has been influential in both Black and LGBTQ filmmaking spheres.

=== 2000s ===
Gina Prince-Bythewood developed her romantic drama Love & Basketball in the 1998 Directors and Screenwriters labs. Gina Prince-Bythewood received an Independent Spirit Award Best Screenplay for the finished film, which was released in 2000. She later returned to Park City to premiere her television drama Shots Fired at the 2016 Festival. Ava DuVernay became the first black female filmmaker to win the Directing Award in the U.S. Dramatic Competition at the 2012 Sundance Film Festival for her film Middle of Nowhere. A trailblazer in telling stories that are socially relevant and providing distribution for stories that feature people of color, she's the first Black woman to direct a $100-million-dollar studio film, and she has received Academy Award and Emmy Award nominations for her work. In 2010, DuVernay founded Array, a grassroots distribution, arts, and advocacy collective focused on films by BIPOC and women.

=== 2010s ===
Ava DuVernay, became the first black woman to win the US Dramatic Directing Award at the 2012 Sundance Film Festival. She received an Oscar nomination for her documentary 13th (2016), and has also made history as the first black woman director to be nominated for a Golden Globe. DuVernay continued her career in filmmaking with A Wrinkle in Time, released in 2018 with an estimated budget surpassing $100 million, making DuVernay the first black female to direct a live-action film with a budget of that size. Recently, she created, co-wrote, produced and directed the Netflix drama limited series When They See Us, based on the 1989 Central Park jogger case, which has earned critical acclaim. The series was nominated for 16 Emmy Awards including the Primetime Emmy Award for Outstanding Limited Series and won the Critics' Choice Television Award for Best Limited Series. “Selma” helped Ava DuVernay become the first Black woman to be nominated for a Golden Globe for best director and the first Black female director to be nominated for best picture. In 2017, she was nominated for the Oscar for best documentary feature for her film “13th.”

Issa Rae is a writer, director, producer, and actress in the hit HBO television show Insecure. She started her career as a filmmaker in her dorm room at Stanford University, where she later found the inspiration for the YouTube series The Misadventures of Awkward Black Girl. In 2013, Rae partnered with Pharrell Williams for season 2 of The Misadventures of Awkward Black Girl on the YouTube channel IamOther. Since the premiere of Insecure, Rae has received two Golden Globe Nominations for Best Actress – Television Series Musical or Comedy as well as a Primetime Emmy nomination for Outstanding Lead Actress in a Comedy Series. Issa Rae has partnered with Columbia Pictures to promote real stories via ColorCreative, a mentorship program in Inglewood, Calif.

Mati Diop, a French-Senegalese director was the first black female filmmaker to be included in the prestigious Cannes Film Festival competition, in 2019. Her film Atlantics was up for the Palme d'Or, the top honor of the Cannes competition.

Dream Hampton in 2019 produced Surviving R. Kelly, which received a Peabody Award, an MTV Movie Award for "Best Documentary," and a Rockies Award for "Program of the Year" at the Banff World Media Festival.

Chinonye Chukwu is a Nigerian-American filmmaker that in 2010, directed The Dance Lesson. She produced her first feature film Alaska-Land in 2012. She has written and directed Clemency in 2019, which she received the U.S. Dramatic Grand Jury Prize at 2019 Sundance for and became the first black woman to win the biggest prize.

American actress and producer Marsai Martin became the youngest person ever to produce a movie at the age of 14 when she was the executive producer for the movie Little, and also the youngest to have earned a deal with any film-making studio.

=== 2020s ===
An analysis of top films from 2007 to 2021 shows “real progress behind the camera,” according to the report released by the USC Annenberg Inclusion Initiative; however, of the 1,542 directors over that span, "less than 2%" represented "minority female directors". At the Sundance Film Festival 2020, three black women directors took home a prize.

Maïmouna Doucouré is a French film maker. Her feature film, Cuties, first premiered at the 2020 Sundance Film Festival. Radha Blank made her first feature film, The 40-Year-Old Version, in 2020. Blank went on to win the Directing Award in the U.S Dramatic Competition.

Regina King's One Night in Miami..., her feature film directorial debut, premiered at the Venice Film Festival on September 7, 2020, a first for an African-American female director.

== Representation and industry barriers ==
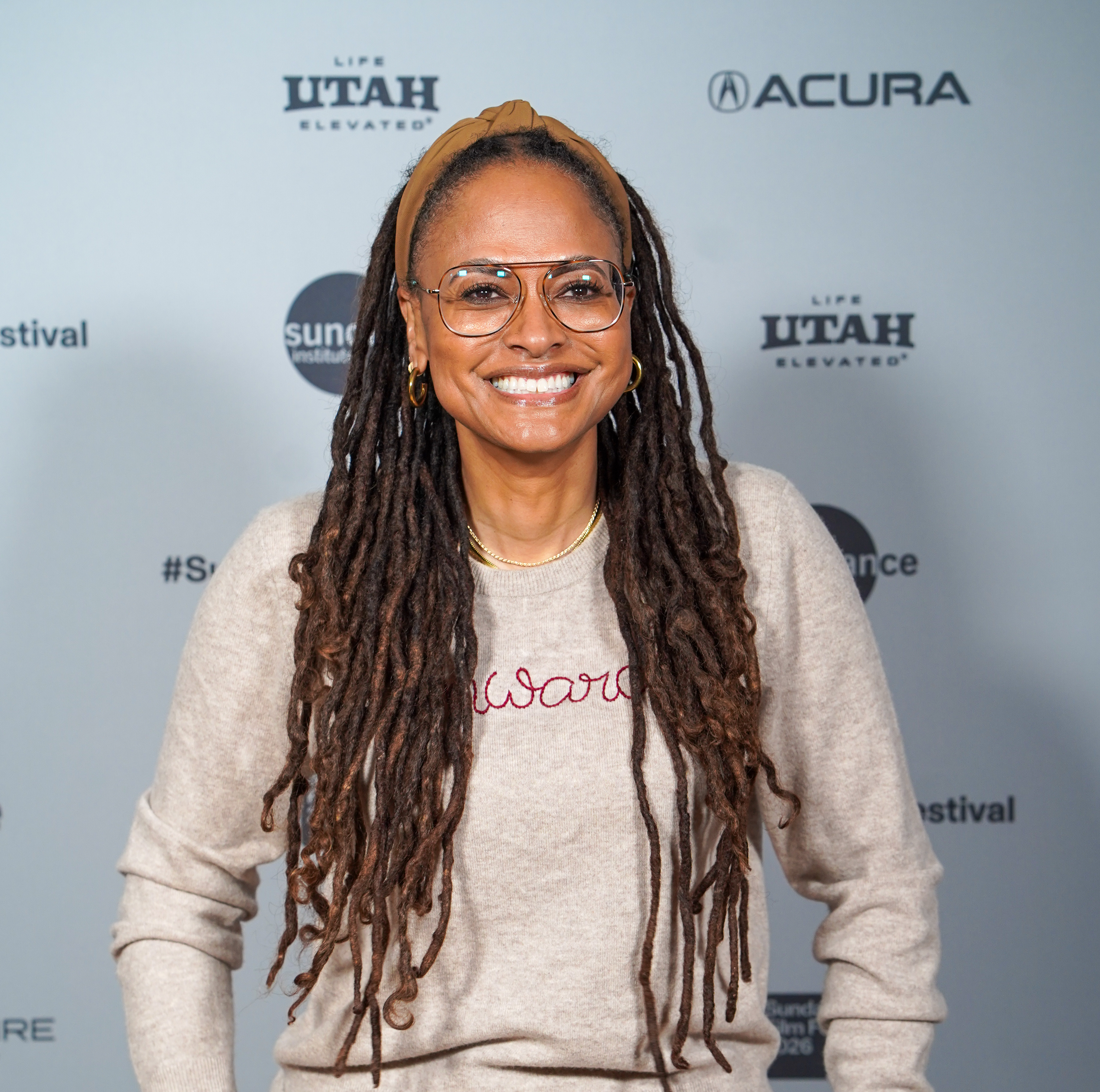
Ava DuVernay at the 2026 Sundance Film Festival

Black women have been part of filmmaking since the early 1900's, but their work has often received less recognition than that of white filmmakers and black men. Many worked as directors, producers, writers, editors, and in other creative roles, yet their contributions were often left out of traditional film history. More recent research has helped highlight their work and recognize the role they have played in shaping the film industry.

Throughout the history of filmmaking, black women have also faced barriers tied to both race and gender. Many have had fewer opportunities to receive funding, work with major studios, move into leadership roles, or get their films widely distributed. Directors like Julie Dash, Euzhan Palcy, Kasi Lemmons, and Ava DuVernay have earned critical recognition, but researchers say black women continue to be underrepresented behind the camera.

Research has also shown that black women filmmakers have helped expand how black women, families, and communities are portrayed on screen. By telling stories from their own perspectives, they have challenged stereotypes that have often appeared in mainstream films. Their work has contributed to more authentic and diverse presentations of Black experiences in American cinema.

Despite these challenges, black women filmmakers have continued to shape the industry through independent films, documentaries, mentorship, and community organizations. Researchers continue to emphasize the importance of preserving their history, recognizing their contributions, and creating more opportunities for future generations of black women filmmakers.

== Global representation ==
Globally, Black women filmmakers continue to break boundaries. Mati Diop, a French-Senegalese director made history with her film, "Atlantics" at Cannes in 2019. Initiatives alike "Black Women Disrupt the Web" (Brazil, Colombia, Kenya, South Africa) and Diversity in Cannes are supporting a new wave of film-making across the African diaspora yearly, aiming to counter the under representation in the field, while highlighting international talent.

== Selected black women filmmakers and filmography ==
=== Zora Neale Hurston ===
- Zora Neal Hurston Fieldwork Footage (1928)
- Commandment Keeper Church, Beaufort South Carolina 1940 (1940)

=== Madeline Anderson ===
- A Tribute to Malcolm X (1967)
- I Am Somebody (1970)
- Being Me (1975)
- Sesame Street (1974-1975)

=== Liz White ===
- Othello (1980)

=== Kathleen Collins ===
- The Cruz Brothers and Miss Malloy (1980)
- Losing Ground (1982)

=== Euzhan Palcy ===
- Sugar Cane Alley (1983)
- Simeon (1995)
- The Wonderful World of Disney (1998)

=== Zeinabu irene Davis ===
- Filmstatement (1982)
- Re-creating Black Women's Media Image (1983)
- Crocodile Conspiracy (1986)
- Sweet Bird of Youth (1987)
- Cycles (1989)
- Trumpetistically, Clora Bryant (1989)
- A Powerful Thang (1991)
- Mother of the River (1995)
- Compensation (1999)

=== Debbie Allen ===
- Fame (1982-1987)
- A Different World (1988-1993)
- The Fresh Prince of Bel-Air (1990)
- The Sinbad Show (1993-1994)
- The Old Settler (2001)
- Life Is Not a Fairy Tale - The Fantasia Barrino Story (2006)
- Alex In Wonderland (2008)
- Christmas on the Square (2020)

=== Maya Angelou ===
- Down in the Delta (1998)

=== Cheryl Dunye ===
- The Watermelon Women (1996)
- Black is Blue (2014)
- Queen Sugar (2019)

=== Julie Dash ===
- Illusions (1982)
- Daughters of the Dust (1991)
- The Rosa Parks Story (2002)

=== Kasi Lemmons ===
- Eve's Bayou (1997)
- Talk To Me (2007)
- Harriet (2019)
- Self Made: Inspired by the Life of Madame C.J. Walker (2020)

=== Neema Barnette ===
- The Cosby Show (1989–1990)
- American Playhouse- Zora Is My Name (1990)
- A Different World (1990–1991)
- Run For the Dream- The Gail Devers Story (1996)
- Civil Brand (2002)
- All You've Got (2006)
- Super Sweet 16: The Movie (2007)
- Heaven Ain't Hard to Find (2010)

=== Mara Brock Akil ===
- Moesha (1998-1999)
- The Jamie Fox Show (1990-2000)
- Girlfriends (2001-2008)
- The Game (2006-2015)

=== Debra Martin Chase ===
- Cinderella (1997)
- The Princess Diaries (2001)
- The Cheetah Girls (2003)
- The Sisterhood of the Traveling Pants (2005)
- Just Wright (2010)

=== Stephanie Allain ===
- Biker Boyz (2003)
- Hustle & Flow (2005)
- Something New (2006)
- Dear White People (2017)

=== Darnell Martin ===
- I Like It Like That (1994) - the first production of a major film studio directed by an African-American woman
- Prison Song (2001)
- Their Eyes Were Watching God (2005)
- Cadillac Records (2008)
- The Lost Valentine (2011)

=== Gina Prince-Bythewood ===
- Love & Basketball (2000)
- Daddy's Girl (2007)
- The Secret Life of Bees (2008)
- Beyond the Lights (2014)

=== Dee Rees ===
- Pariah (2011)
- Bessie (2015)
- Mudbound (2017)

=== Numa Perrier ===
- That Guy (2013)
- Hello Cupid (2014)
- Becoming Nia (2014)
- Jezebel (2019)

=== Shola Lynch ===
- Jazz (2001)
- Do You Believe in Miracles: The U.S. Hockey Team (2001)
- Chisolm '72 Unbought & Unbossed (2004)
- American Gangster (2006-2007)

=== Victoria Mahoney ===
- Yelling to the Sky (2011)
- Exhale (2012)

=== Mati Diop ===
- Atlantiques (2009)
- Snow Canon (2011)
- Big in Vietnam (2012)
- Mille Soleils (2013)
- Dahomey (2024)

=== Amma Asante ===
- A Way of Life (2004)
- Belle (2013)
- A United Kingdom (2016)
- Where Hands Touch (2018)

=== Tina Gordon ===
- Drumline (2002)
- ATL (2006)
- Peeples (2013)
- Good Girls (2018)

=== Stella Meghie ===
- Jean of the Joneses (2016)
- Everything, Everything (2017)
- The Weekend (2018)
- The Photograph (2020)

=== Shonda Rhimes ===
- Bridgerton (2020)
- Inventing Anna (2022)
- Greys Anatomy (2005-2022)
- How to Get Away with Murder (2014-2020)

=== Issa Rae ===
- Insecure (2016-2020)
- The Lovebirds (2020)
- The Photograph (2020)
- Sweet Life: Los Angeles (2021)

=== Ava DuVernay ===
Ava DuVernay's drama “Queen Sugar” continued to fuel a pipeline of female directors of color with its most recent seasons. DuVernay launched Array Crew, a database of below-the-line talent in a bid to facilitate increased hiring of diverse crew.

- Selma (2014)
- Queen Sugar (2016)
- A Wrinkle In Time (2018)
- When They See Us (2019)
- Colin in Black and White (2021)
- Naomi (2022)
- Origin (2023)

=== Lena Waithe ===
Lena Waithe has created a number of successful series. She has created complex Black characters who are connected in a variety of ways, through family ties, friendships, oppositions ad social roles.

- The Chi (2018-2021)
- Twenties (2020-2021)
- Queen & Slim (2019)
- Boomerang (2020)
- Them (2021)

=== Alyscia Cunningham ===
Trinidadian-American filmmaker, author, and founder of Her House Media, known for impact-driven documentaries and horror films focusing on cultural heritage and resilience.

- I Am More Than My Hair (2019)
- Senses (2023)
- Negro Mountain (2024)
- Douen II (2025)
- Seeing Without Sight (2025)
- Douen (2026)

=== Nia DaCosta ===
2021's Candyman opened at the top of the domestic box office, making Nia DaCosta the first Black female filmmaker to have a movie debut in the No. 1 slot.

- Little Woods (2018)
- Ghost Tape (2020)
- Candyman (2021)
- The Marvels (2023)
- Hedda (2025)
- 28 Years Later: The Bone Temple (2026)

== See also ==
- L.A. Rebellion
