= Black women in the silent film era =

Black Women Film Pioneers
- 1890s–1920s
- Including: Birdie Gilmore; Drusilla Dunjee Houston; Eloyce King Patrick Gist; Zora Neale Hurston; Eslanda Robeson; Alice B. Russell; Tressie Souders; Madame E. Toussaint Welcome; Mrs. M. Webb; Maria P. Williams; Madame Sul-Te-Wan; Evelyn Preer; Floy Clements; Susie Sutton; Laura Bowman; Cleo Desmond; Anita Bush

African American cinema evolved at just about the same pace as white cinema, and although the role of Black women in early silent film has only recently begun to receive popular and academic attention, Black women were involved in Black cinema from the very start of American film history. In their own day, Maria P. Williams was called the first Black woman filmmaker for her work on The Flames of Wrath (1923) and Tressie Souders was also honored with the same distinction for her work in A Woman’s Error (1922). Others have argued that that distinction belongs to Madame E. Toussaint Welcome's war documentary Doing Their Bit (1916) or Eloyce King Patrick Gist for Hell Bound Train (ca. 1929–30). What's certain is that Black women were contributing as screenwriters, actors, directors and producers from the earliest days of film.

== History ==
The film industry's pioneers include Alice B. Russell, Eslanda Robeson, Eloyce King Patrick Gist, Zora Neale Hurston, Tressie Souders, Madame E. Toussaint Welcome, Mrs. M. Webb and Birdie Gilmore whose contributions occurred when both African American women and men took on the role of director, producer and screenwriter. Influential women such as Dorothy Davenport and Maria P. Williams also worked very hard to break female and racial stereotypes which also extended to how women contributed to the film-making process. According to The Library of Congress publication on silent era women behind the camera, women had more participation in the film industry in a wider sense than perceived, and the role of film editor, for example, was viewed as a women's job. Other women took on roles as script writer, producer, director, camera operator, colorist, reader, script girl and casting director.

The Silent film era in the United States was from the late 1890s to the mid-1920s, but only a fraction of the original inventory still exist today. “There is no single number for existing American silent-era feature films, as the surviving copies vary in format and completeness.” There are silent films that would only some portions of it that have survived such as its title, but would be missing one or two reels of film. Only 2,749 (25%) of American silent feature films survive in complete form. Another 562 (17% of the surviving titles and 5% of total production) survive in incomplete form. For all these reasons, many more women of color were likely involved than we currently know.

== Gallery ==
(Selection was limited by availability.)

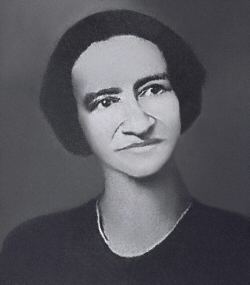
Drusilla Dunjee Houston

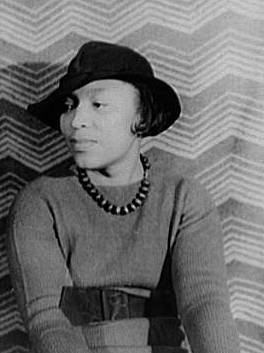
Zora Neale Hurston

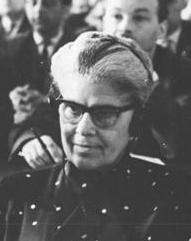
Eslanda Robeson

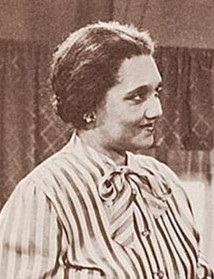
Alice B. Russell

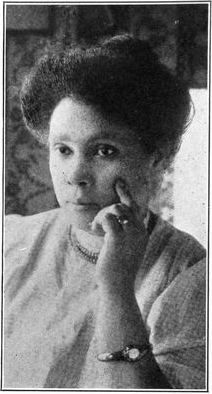
Maria P. Williams

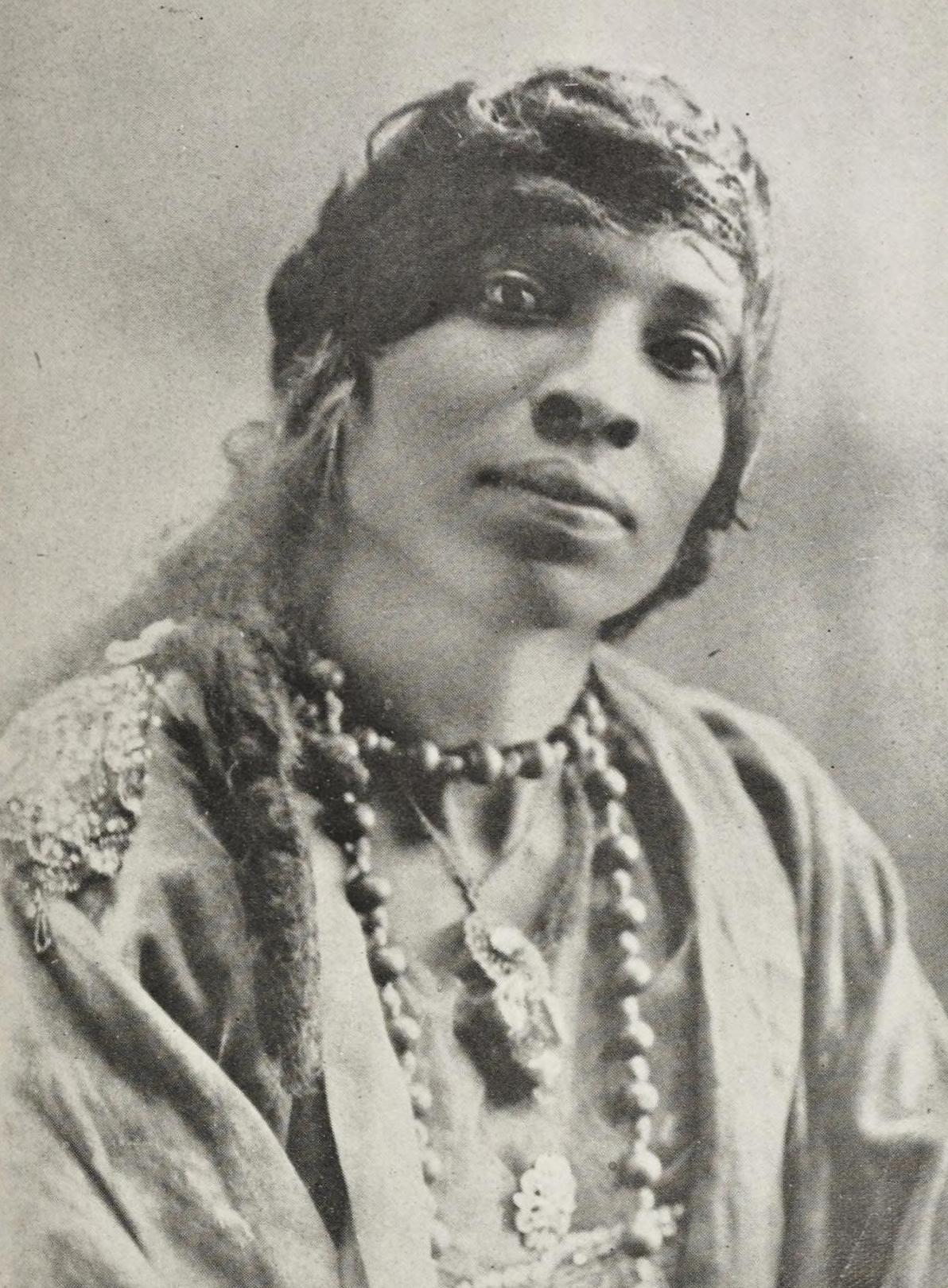
Madame Sul-Te-Wan

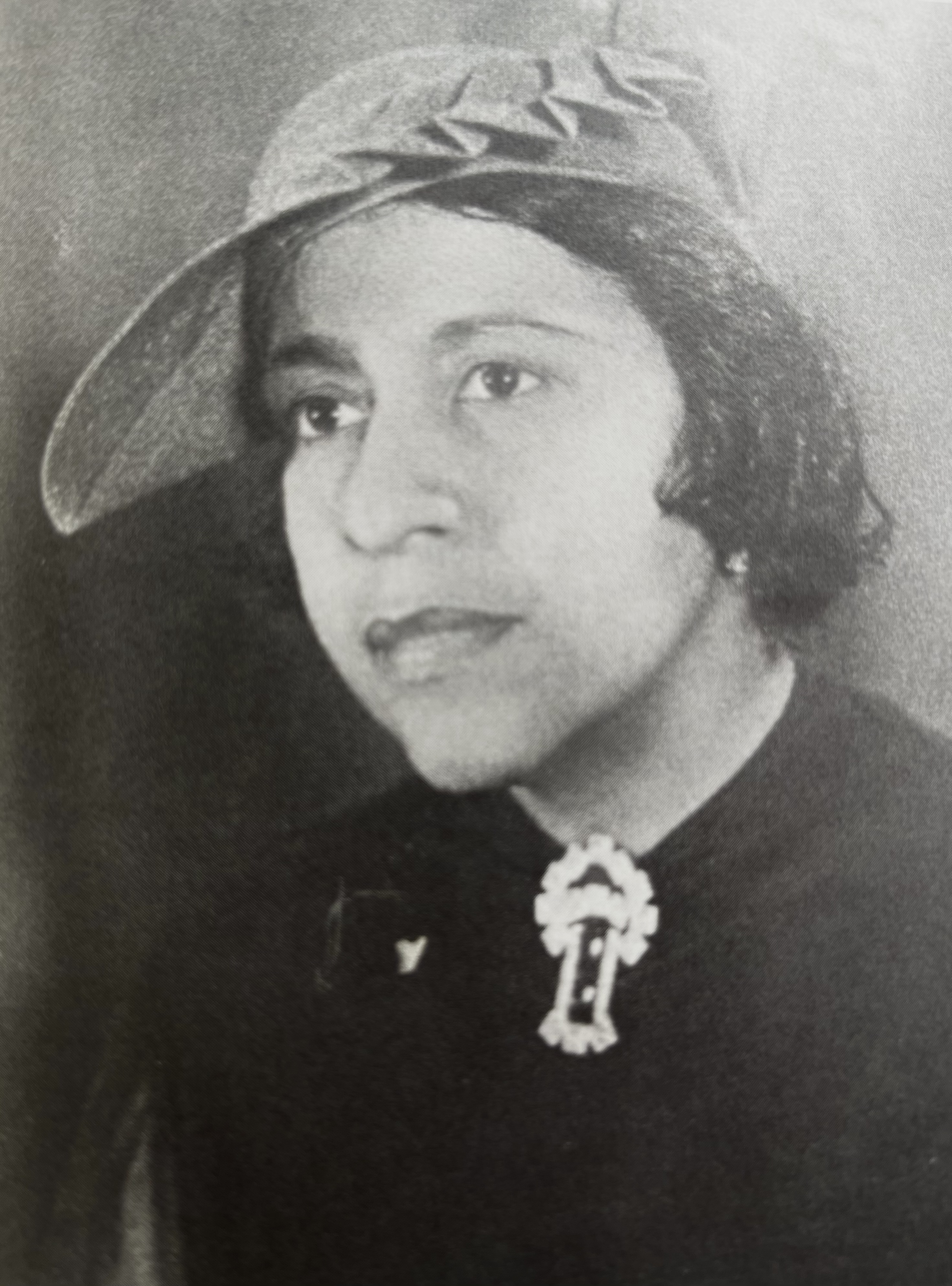
Anita Bush

Evelyn Preer

== See also ==
=== More on Black women film pioneers ===
- A website for Sisters in Cinema Documentary: A History of African American Women Feature Film Directors
- Black Film Archive: A showcase for Black films made from 1915 to 1979
- Columbia University on Women Film Pioneer Project: African-American Women in the Silent Film Industry
- The Atlantic on When Hollywood's Power Players Were Women

=== Early Black film ===
- African American cinema
- Black women filmmakers
- Pioneers of African-American Cinema
- Race film
