= Historical Feature Films =

Historical Feature Films was a film production company in the United States. It was established in 1915 and produced at least 4 films. The company's films featured African American casts and included bigoted tropes and stereotypes that demeaned the characters. The studio's films were re-released by Ebony Film Corporation.

== Films ==
- A Natural Born Shooter
- Money Talks in Darktown
- Aladdin Jones
- Two Knights of Vaudeville

=== Aladdin Jones ===
Aladdin Jones is a 1915 short American comedy film made with an African American cast. It features derogatory stereotypes. Florence McCain and Jimmy Marshall star in the Historical Feature Films production. It was distributed by Ebony Pictures.
