= Tactile sensor =

Measuring device on physical interaction

The SynTouch BioTac, a multimodal tactile sensor modeled after the human fingertip

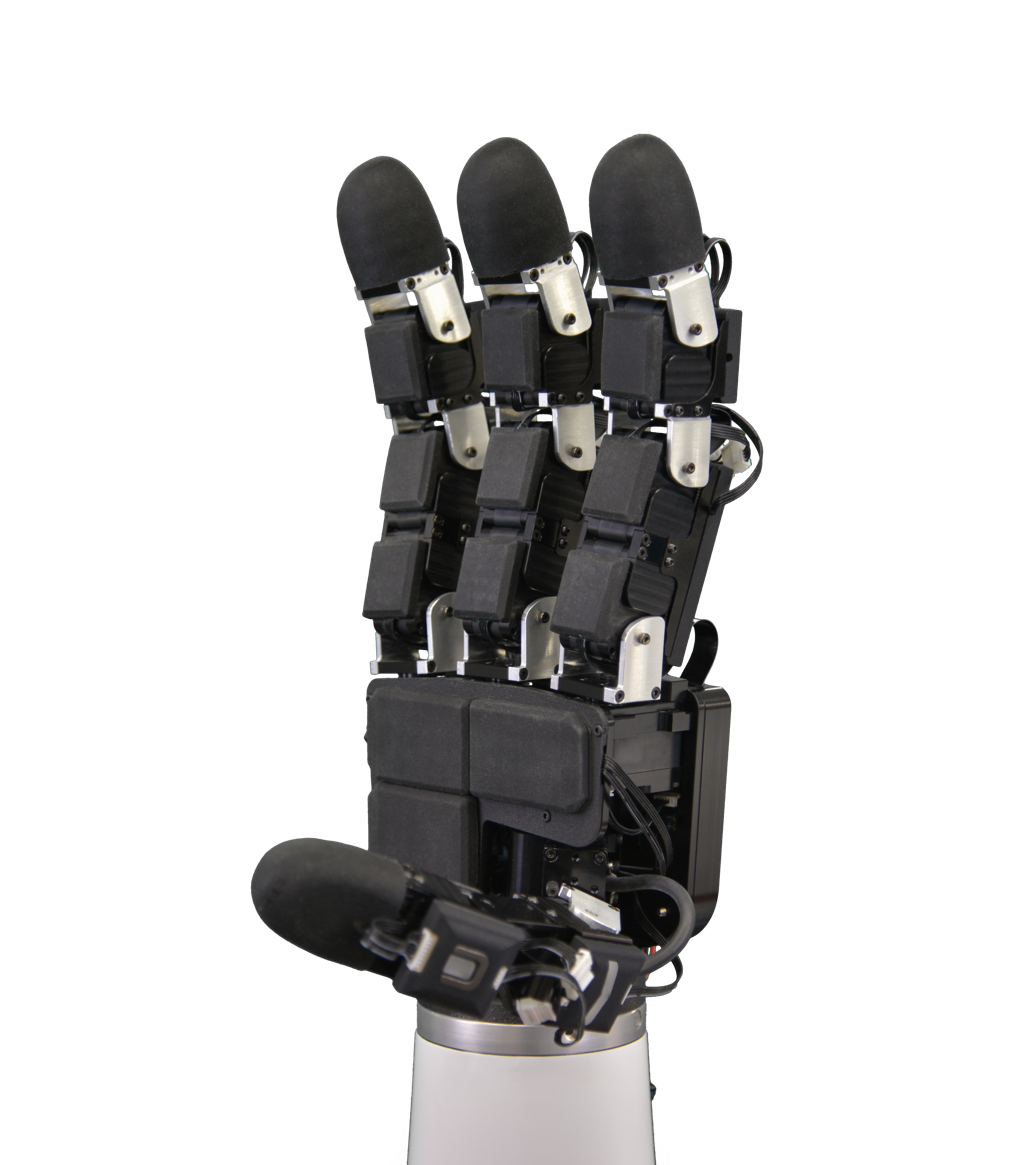
uSkin Sensor by XELA Robotics, a high-density 3-axis tactile sensor in a thin, soft, durable package, with minimal wiring

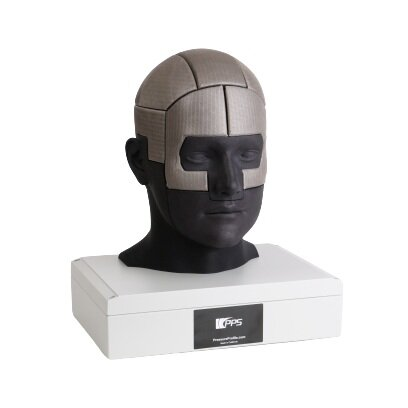
A PPS tactile sensor system (TactileHead) designed to quantify the pressure distribution over the face and head. Useful to optimise the ergonomic design of headgear and eyewear.

A tactile sensor is a device that measures information arising from physical interaction with its environment. Tactile sensors are generally modeled after the biological sense of cutaneous touch which is capable of detecting stimuli resulting from mechanical stimulation, temperature, and pain (although pain sensing is not common in artificial tactile sensors). Tactile sensors are used in robotics, computer hardware and security systems. A common application of tactile sensors is in touchscreen devices on mobile phones and computing.

Tactile sensors may be of different types including piezoresistive, piezoelectric, optical, capacitive and elastoresistive sensors.

== Uses ==
Tactile sensors appear in everyday life such as elevator buttons and lamps which dim or brighten by touching the base.

Sensors that measure very small changes must have very high sensitivities. Sensors need to be designed to have a small effect on what is measured; making the sensor smaller often improves this and may introduce other advantages. Tactile sensors can be used to test the performance of all types of applications. For example, these sensors have been used in the manufacturing of automobiles (brakes, clutches, door seals, gasket), battery lamination, bolted joints, fuel cells etc.

Tactile imaging, as a medical imaging modality, translating the sense of touch into a digital image is based on the tactile sensors. Tactile imaging closely mimics manual palpation, since the probe of the device with a pressure sensor array mounted on its face acts similar to human fingers during clinical examination, deforming soft tissue by the probe and detecting resulting changes in the pressure pattern.

Robots designed to interact with objects requiring handling involving precision, dexterity, or interaction with unusual objects, need sensory apparatus which is functionally equivalent to a human's tactile ability. Tactile sensors have been developed for use with robots. Tactile sensors can complement visual systems by providing added information when the robot begins to grip an object. At this time vision is no longer sufficient, as the mechanical properties of the object cannot be determined by vision alone. Determining weight, texture, stiffness, center of mass, curvature, coefficient of friction, and thermal conductivity require object interaction and some sort of tactile sensing.

Several classes of tactile sensors are used in robots of different kinds, for tasks spanning collision avoidance and manipulation. Some methods for simultaneous localization and mapping are based on tactile sensors.

== Pressure sensor arrays ==
Pressure sensor arrays are large grids of tactels. A "tactel" is a 'tactile element'. Each tactel is capable of detecting normal forces. Tactel-based sensors provide a high resolution 'image' of the contact surface. Alongside spatial resolution and force sensitivity, systems-integration questions such as wiring and signal routing are important. Pressure sensor arrays are available in thin-film form. They are primarily used as analytical tools used in the manufacturing and R&D processes by engineers and technicians, and have been adapted for use in robots. Examples of such sensors available to consumers include arrays built from conductive rubber, lead zirconate titanate (PZT), polyvinylidene fluoride(PVDF), PVDF-TrFE, FET, and metallic capacitive sensing elements.

== Optically-based tactile sensors ==
Several kinds of tactile sensors have been developed that take advantage of camera-like technology to provide high-resolution data. A key exemplar is the Gelsight technology first developed at MIT which uses a camera behind an opaque gel layer to achieve high-resolution tactile feedback. The Samsung "See-through-your-skin" (STS) sensor uses a semi-transparent gel to produce combined tactile and optical imaging.

== Strain gauge rosettes ==
Strain gauges rosettes are constructed from multiple strain gauges, with each gauge detecting the force in a particular direction. When the information from each strain gauge is combined, the information allows determination of a pattern of forces or torques.

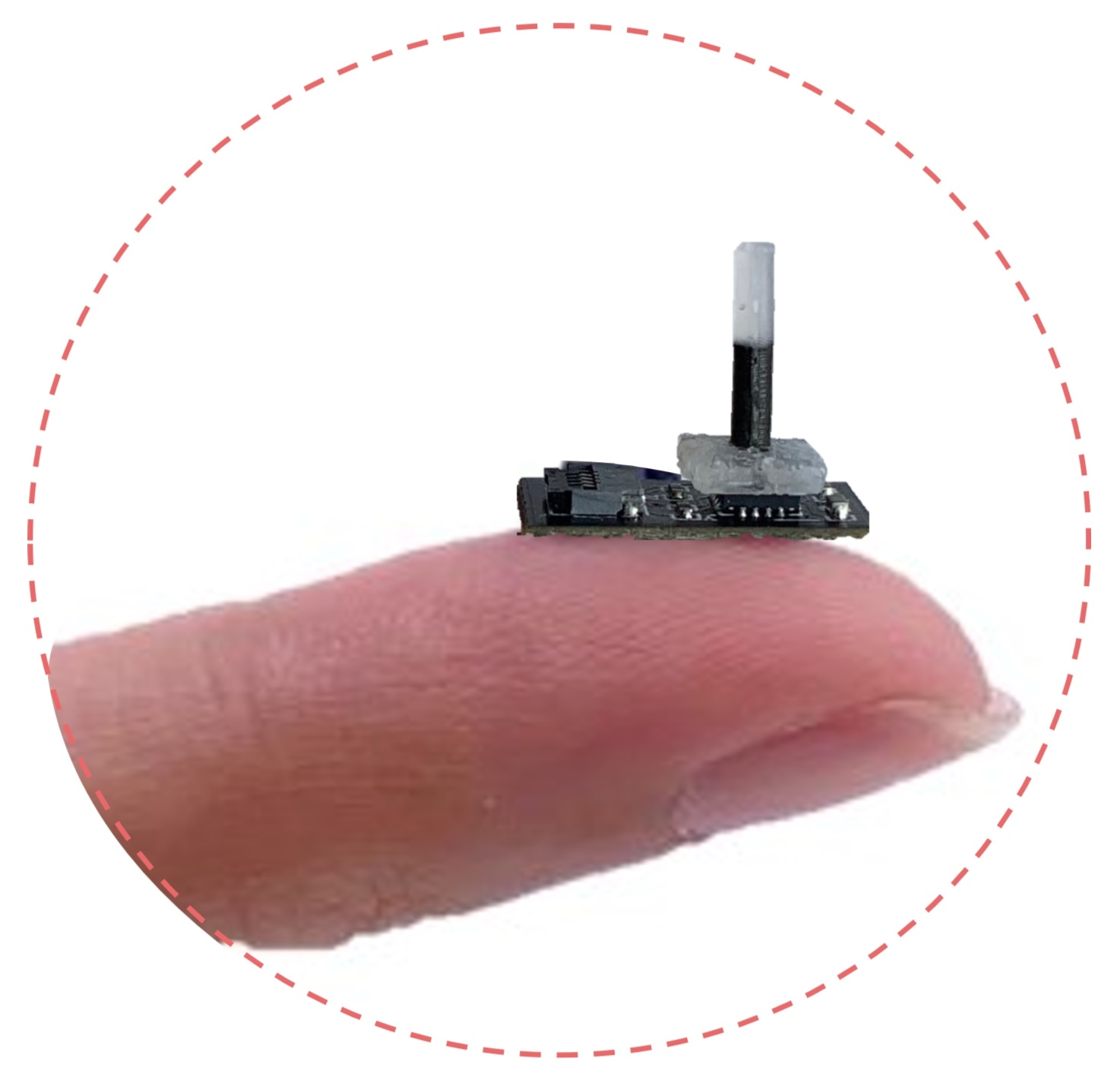
The E-Antenna, a bioinspired robust and omnidirectional-sensitive electronic antenna for tactile-induced perception

== Biologically inspired tactile sensors ==
A variety of biologically inspired designs have been suggested ranging from simple whisker-like sensors which measure only one point at a time through more advanced fingertip-like sensors, to complete skin-like sensors as on the latest iCub. Biologically inspired tactile sensors often incorporate more than one sensing strategy. For example, they might detect both the distribution of pressures, and the pattern of forces that would come from pressure sensor arrays and strain gauge rosettes, allowing two-point discrimination and force sensing, with human-like ability.

Advanced versions of biologically designed tactile sensors include vibration sensing which has been determined to be important for understanding interactions between the tactile sensor and objects where the sensor slides over the object. Such interactions are now understood to be important for human tool use and judging the texture, even curvature, of an object. One such sensor combines force sensing, vibration sensing, and heat transfer sensing.

A biologically inspired tactile sensor allows robots to note their surroundings with 1.76° precision, enabling blind navigation and texture recognition.

== DIY and open-hardware tactile sensors ==
Recently, a sophisticated tactile sensor has been made open-hardware, enabling enthusiasts and hobbyists to experiment with an otherwise expensive technology. Furthermore, with the advent of cheap optical cameras, novel sensors have been proposed which can be built easily and cheaply with a 3D printer.

== See also ==
- Tactile technology
- List of sensors
- Pressure measurement
- Sensitivity
- Touch sensor
- Transducer
- Tactile imaging
