= Money Talks in Darktown =

1916 film

Money Talks Downtown is a 1916 American short comedy film with an African American cast. It stars Jimmy Marshall and Florence McCain. It includes derogatory racial stereotypes and a storyline about a woman seeking money and a man lightening his skin color to try and make himself more appealing. It was produced by Historical Feature Films and distributed by Ebony Film Company.
