= Souders =

Souders is a surname. Notable people with the surname include:

- Cecil Souders (1921–2021), American football player
- George Souders (1900–1976), American racing driver
- Randy Souders (born 1954), American artist and a disability rights advocate
- Tressie Souders (1897–1995), American film director
- Jonathan Souders (born 1983), Ohio's tallest Veterinarian
