= Herman Hine Brinsmade =

American novelist and columnist

Herman Hine Brinsmade (September 17, 1876 - April 11, 1968) was an American writer. He wrote the 1912 science fiction novel Utopia Achieved about a futuristic New York City.

Brinsmade was born in Connecticut. He graduated from Cornell University. He married Carlie G. Rea of Nashville in 1907 while he was working at a newspaper in Grand Rapids, Michigan. He worked for the News-Star-World in Monroe, Louisiana and had a column titled Jus' Ramblin'. He died while at a sanitarium recovering from an auto accident and was buried at the Mulhearn Memorial Park Cemetery in Monroe. His daughter became a teacher in Monroe.

His book Utopia Achieved was set in 1960 and had a storyline that advocated for the single tax. The story described a city of the future where people ate an efficient vegetarian diet.

The futuristic New York City depicted in his novel evoked Charles Lamb's multi-level city. The story described a failed socialism in New Zealand and fsvored a single tax system. The book is described as a "primary text" in the utopian catalogue in on journal.

He edited a 1957 book about Eldred K. Means with a collection of his speeches.

== Works ==
- Utopia Achieved: A Novel of the Future (1912),
- For the Good of the Party, Or, The Fortunes of "the Blackville Star" (1916)
- "Real Poured Houses" Technical World Magazine (1911)
- Sunset Gun; the public addresses of Eldred K. Means (Eldred K. Means)
