= A Black Sherlock Holmes =

The film

A Black Sherlock Holmes is an 1918 American silent slapstick comedy short film produced by the Ebony Film Corporation. Written by C.N Davis and directed by R.G Phillips, the film was shot by cinematographer Charles David and produced by Luther Pollard. Released on April 15, 1918, the single reel comedy has a runtime of approximately 21 minutes and 14 seconds.

== Production and preservation ==
A Black Sherlock Holmes was produced by the Ebony Film Corporation, an African-American-led film production company active during the silent film era. The company specialized in slapstick comedies featuring all-Black casts, and A Black Sherlock Holmes represent a typical example of their output during this period.

Like many films of this era the original 35mm nitrate prints of the film suffered intense deterioration over time. In the 1960s, 16mm preservation prints were created from the surviving heavily damaged nitrate prints in an effort to save the remaining footage. These 16mm prints are believed to be the only copies of the film still in existence. The film has been digitally preserved and is currently available in the Chicago Film Archives, with one reel also held at the Library of Congress alongside another Ebony Film Corporation Production, The Comeback of Barnacle Bill.

The Chicago Board of Censors removed a scene depicting a character thumbing his nose prior to the film's theatrical release.

== Plot summary ==
The film follows Detective Knick Garter, described as "The great detector" and his assistant Rheuma Tism as they assist their friend and Inventor I. Wanta Sneeze, who has found himself in trouble. The story begins when I. Wanta Sneeze receives a concerning letter, prompting his daughter Sheeza Sneeze to send an urgent letter to Knick Garter through his window, asking him to "come over at once".

Knick Garter and Rheuma Tism respond to the call and join the Sneeze family to investigate the mysterious letter. Their investigation leads them to confront Baron Jazz, a confidence man who "lives on his wits and other peoples money" Through a series of comic hijinks and schemes, the detective duo successfully resolve the crisis and saves the day for their friends. The film concludes with Knick Garter returning home to his romantic interest, Sheeza Sneeze.

== Cast ==
The cast featured several regular performers from Ebony Film Company productions, reflecting the studios catalogue of African American actors during the silent film era.

- Sam Robinson as Knick Garter - the great detector and protagonist of the film.
- Rudolph Tatun as Rheuma Tism - Knick Garter's assistant.
- George Lewis as I. Wanta Sneeze - an inventor specializing in a "wireless exploder of explosives"
- Evon Junior as Sheeza Sneeze - I. Wanta Sneeze's "doting daughter" and Knick Garter's love interest.
- Sam Jacks as Baron Jazz - the antagonist and con artist.

== Historical significance ==
A Black Sherlock Holmes represents an important artifact of early African American cinema, showcasing Black performers in comedic roles during a period when their representation in mainstream Hollywood films was limited or stereotypical. The Film's survival, provides valuable insight into the independent Black film industry of the 1910s and the types of entertainment created by and for African American audiences.
