= E. W. Kemble =

American illustrator

Edward Winsor Kemble
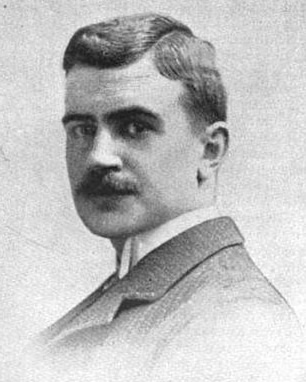
- Kemble c. 1910
- Born: January 18, 1861; Sacramento, California, U.S.
- Died: September 19, 1933 (aged 72); Ridgefield, Connecticut, U.S.
- Occupations: Illustrator, cartoonist
- Known for: racist Caricatures of African Americans
- Notable work: Illustrated first edition of Adventures of Huckleberry Finn

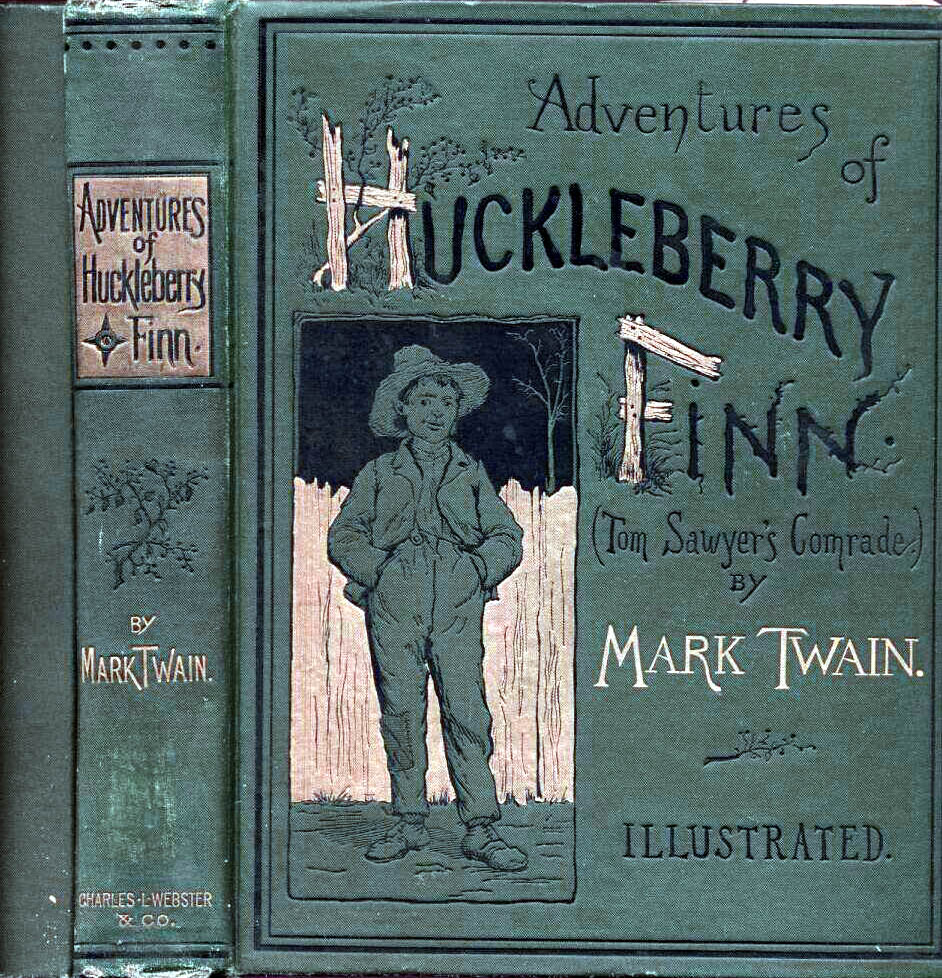
Adventures of Huckleberry Finn, illus. by Kemble (1st US ed., 1885)

Edward Winsor Kemble (January 18, 1861 – September 19, 1933), usually cited as E. W. Kemble, and sometimes referred to incorrectly as Edward Windsor Kemble, was an American illustrator. He is known best for illustrating the first edition of Adventures of Huckleberry Finn and for his caricatures of African Americans.

== Biography ==
Kemble was born in Sacramento, California. His father was newspaper publisher Edward Cleveland Kemble. In 1875, he was enrolled at a boarding school in Philadelphia, which was a center of artistic activity. His artistic talent was such that he was a successful contributor to periodicals by 1881. He became the major political cartoonist for the New York Daily Graphic while receiving his only formal artistic training at the Art Students League of New York.

When Life magazine was founded in 1883, Kemble became a frequent contributor to its early issues. He was a staff political cartoonist for Collier's from 1903 to 1907, for Harper's Weekly from 1907 to 1912 before returning to Collier's, and for Leslie's Weekly and Judge in the late 1910s.

His cartoons attracted the attention of Mark Twain, who employed Kemble to illustrate Adventures of Huckleberry Finn. Kemble subsequently illustrated several other famous books, including Twain's Puddin' Head Wilson, Harriet Beecher Stowe's Uncle Tom's Cabin, Washington Irving's Knickerbocker History of New York, and many of Joel Chandler Harris' Uncle Remus stories.

Kemble made a specialty of illustrating Black characters, and his work ranged from overtly racist caricatures to more human sociological studies depending upon his audience.

Kemble illustrated three books authored by Eldred Kurtz Means.

Kemble lived in the Rochelle Park area of suburban New Rochelle.

He died at 72 following a brief illness on September 19, 1933, at his daughter's home in Ridgefield, Connecticut.

== Sources ==
- Horn, Maurice, ed. The World Encyclopedia of Cartoons. 2d ed. Philadelphia: Chelsea House Publishers, 1999.
- Reed, Walt. The Illustrator in America, 1860–2000. New York: The Society of Illustrators, 2001.
- Samuels, Peggy, and Harold Samuels. Samuels' Encyclopedia of Artists of the American West. Secaucus, N.J.: Castle, 1985.
