= The Flames of Wrath =

1923 American silent film

- Directed by: John W. Simms
- Written by: Samuel Ellison
- Produced by: Maria P. Williams
- Starring: Maria P. Williams; Frank Colbert; John Burton; Roxie Mankins; Charles Pearson
- Production company: Western Film Booking Company
- Release date: 1923
- Country: United States
- Language: Silent film

The Flames of Wrath is a 1923 American black-and-white silent crime drama film produced by Maria P. Williams. The film stars Maria P. Williams and Frank Colbert in the lead roles. John Burton, Roxie Mankins, Anna Kelso, John Johnson, and Charles Pearson have supporting roles. The film was also the first film ever produced by an African-American woman. This is Williams' first and only film released. The film begins with the murder and robbing of P.C. Gordon and one thief, C. Dates, is arrested. But he escapes prison and searches for the ring he buried. The story moves with the searching of ring and the catching of Dates by the prosecutor.

The film consisted of five reels. The film reel has been considered lost for decades. The UCLA Young Research Library has a single frame of a newspaper article describing the movie in the acquisition of George P. Johnson‘s papers in 1992. The film was originally released in 1923.

== Cast ==
- Maria P. Williams as Prosecuting attorney
- Frank Colbert as C. Dates
- John Burton as William Jackson
- Roxie Mankins as Pauline Keith
- Charles Pearson as Guy Braxton
- Anna Kelso as Flora Fulton
- John Lester Johnson as Frank Keith
