= James Van Der Zee =

American photographer (1886–1983)

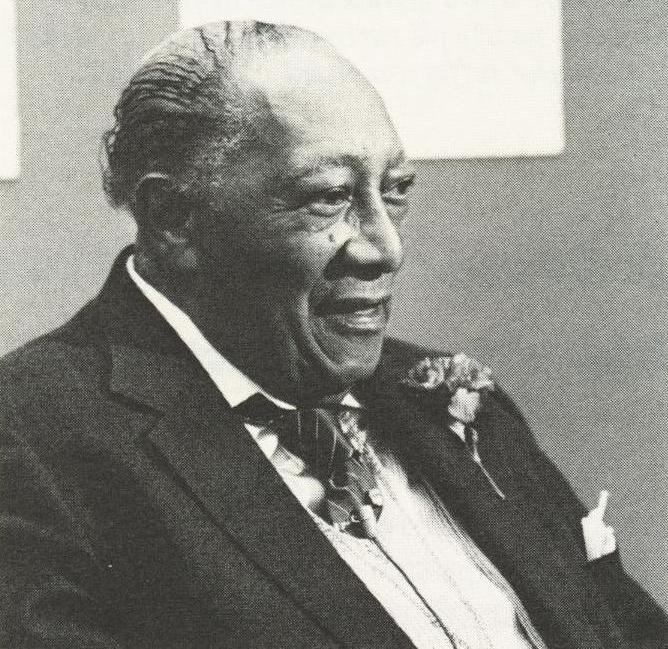
- Van Der Zee in 1981
- Born: June 29, 1886; Lenox, Massachusetts, U.S.
- Died: May 15, 1983 (aged 96); Washington, D.C., U.S.
- Known for: Portrait photography
- Movement: Harlem Renaissance
- Spouses: Kate L. Brown (m. 1907; div. 1914); Gaynella Greenlee (m. 1918; died 1976); Donna Mussenden (m. 1978)
- Children: 2

James Augustus Van Der Zee (June 29, 1886 – May 15, 1983) was an American photographer best known for his portraits of black New Yorkers. He was a leading figure in the Harlem Renaissance. Aside from the artistic merits of his work, Van Der Zee produced the most comprehensive documentation of the period. Among his most famous subjects during this time were Marcus Garvey, Bill "Bojangles" Robinson and Countee Cullen.

== Biography ==
Born in Lenox, Massachusetts, Van Der Zee demonstrated an early gift for music and initially aspired to a career as a professional violinist. Van Der Zee's second interest was in photography. He bought his first camera when he was 14, and improvised a darkroom in his parents' home. He took hundreds of photographs of his family as well as his hometown of Lenox. Van Der Zee was one of the first people to provide an early documentation of his community life in small-town New England.

In 1906, he moved with his father and brother to Harlem in New York City, where he worked as a waiter and elevator operator. By now, Van Der Zee was a skilled pianist and aspiring professional violinist. He would become the primary creator and one of the five performers in a group known as the Harlem Orchestra. In March 1907, Van Der Zee married Kate L. Brown and they moved back to Lenox to have their daughter, Rachel, born in September. Soon after, they moved to Phoebus, Virginia. In 1908, their son, Emile, was born but died within a year from pneumonia.

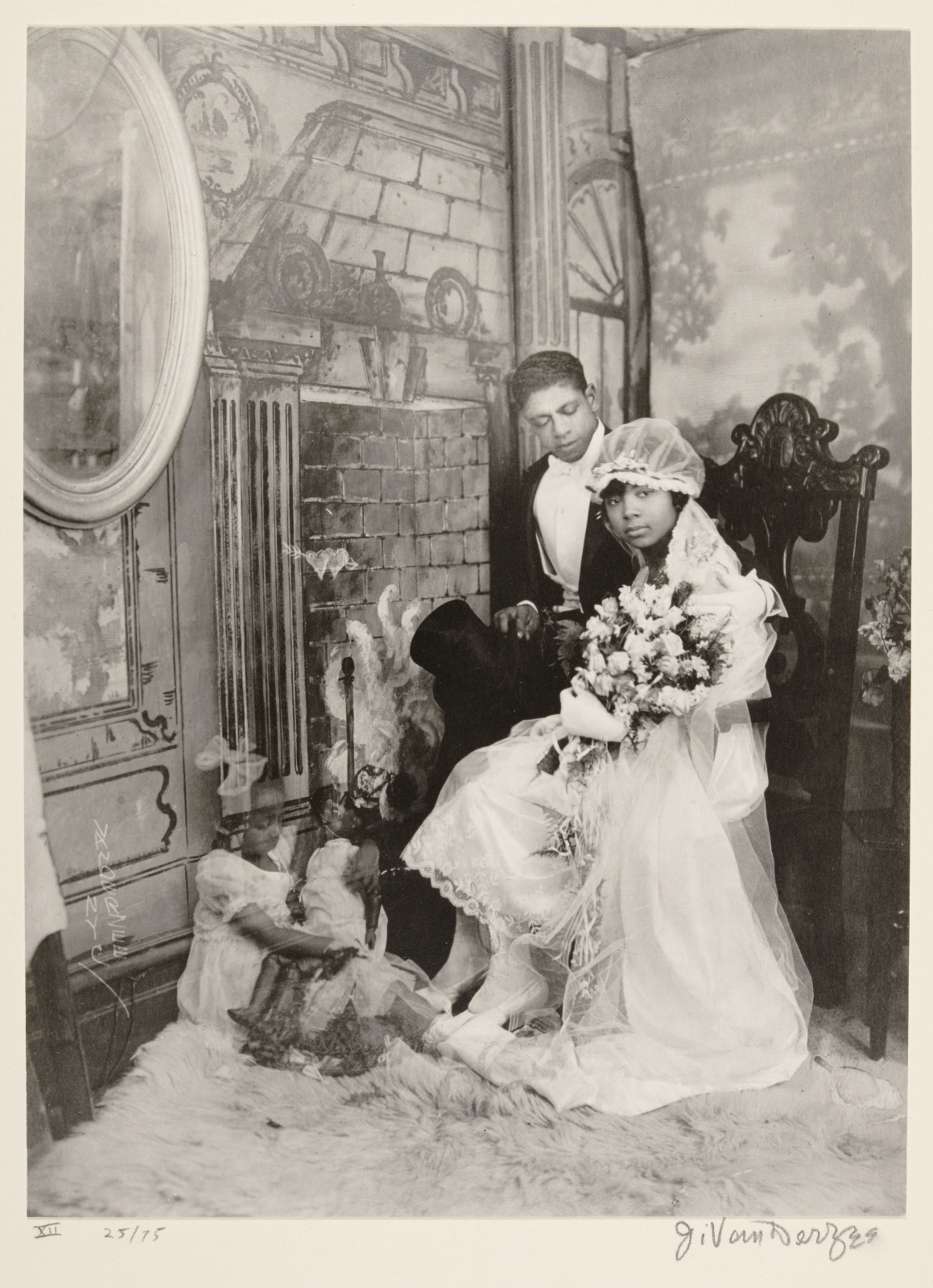
Wedding Day, Harlem, 1926, printed 1974, Gelatin silver print. Clark Art Institute, Williamstown

In 1915, he moved to Newark, New Jersey, where he took a job in a portrait studio, first as a darkroom assistant and then as a portraitist. That same year, he converted to Catholicism and began taking assignments from the Church. He returned to Harlem the following year, just as large numbers of Black immigrants and migrants were arriving into that part of the city. He set up a studio at the Toussaint Conservatory of Art and Music with his sister, Jennie Louise Van Der Zee, also known as Madame E Toussaint, who had founded the conservatory in 1911.

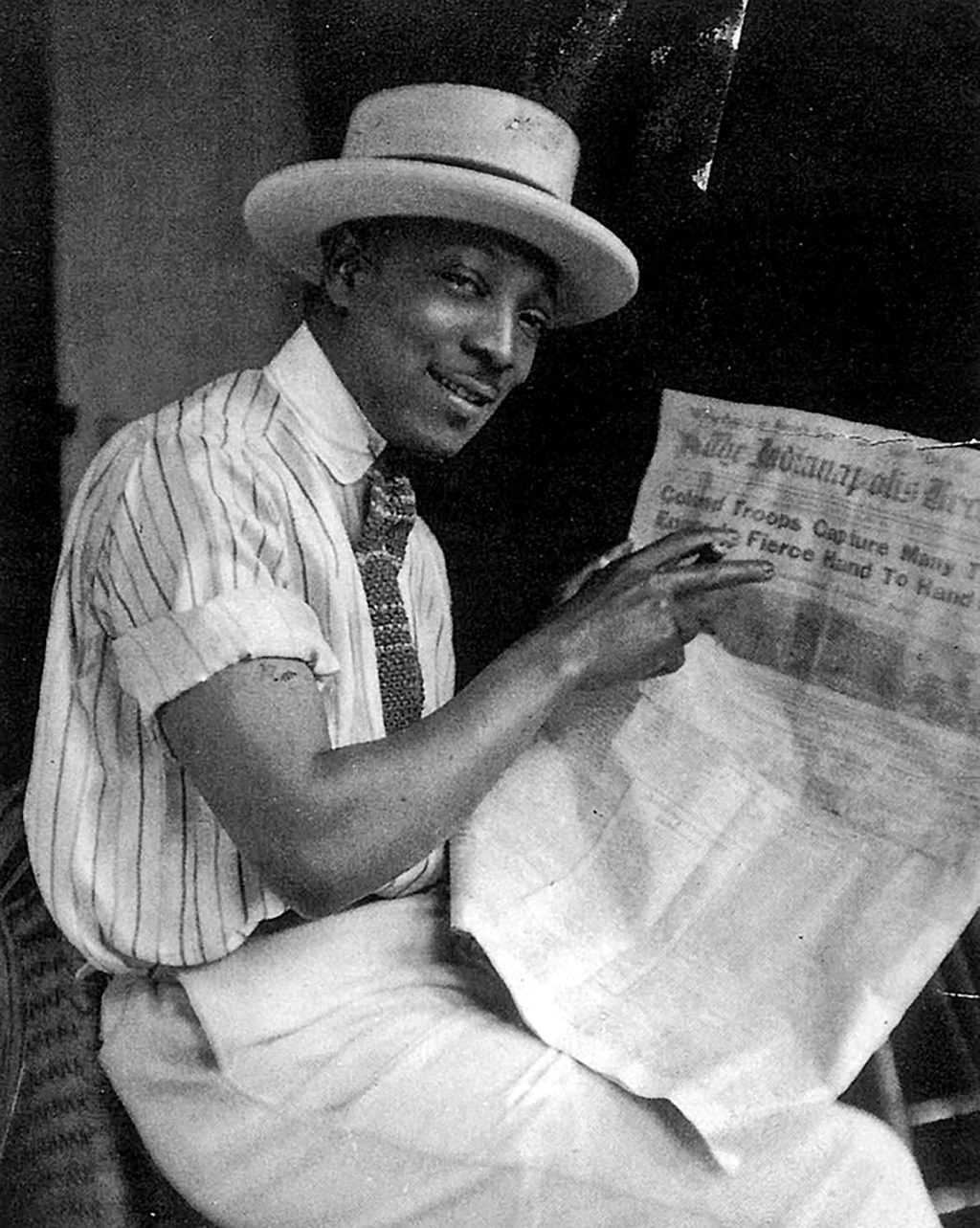
Self-portrait, 1918

In 1916, Van Der Zee and Gaynella Greenlee launched the Guarantee Photo Studio on West 125th Street in Harlem. They married in 1918. His business boomed during World War I, and the portraits he shot from this period until 1945 have demanded the majority of critical attention. In 1919, he photographed the victory parade of the returning 369th Infantry Regiment, a predominantly African American unit sometimes called the "Harlem Hellfighters."

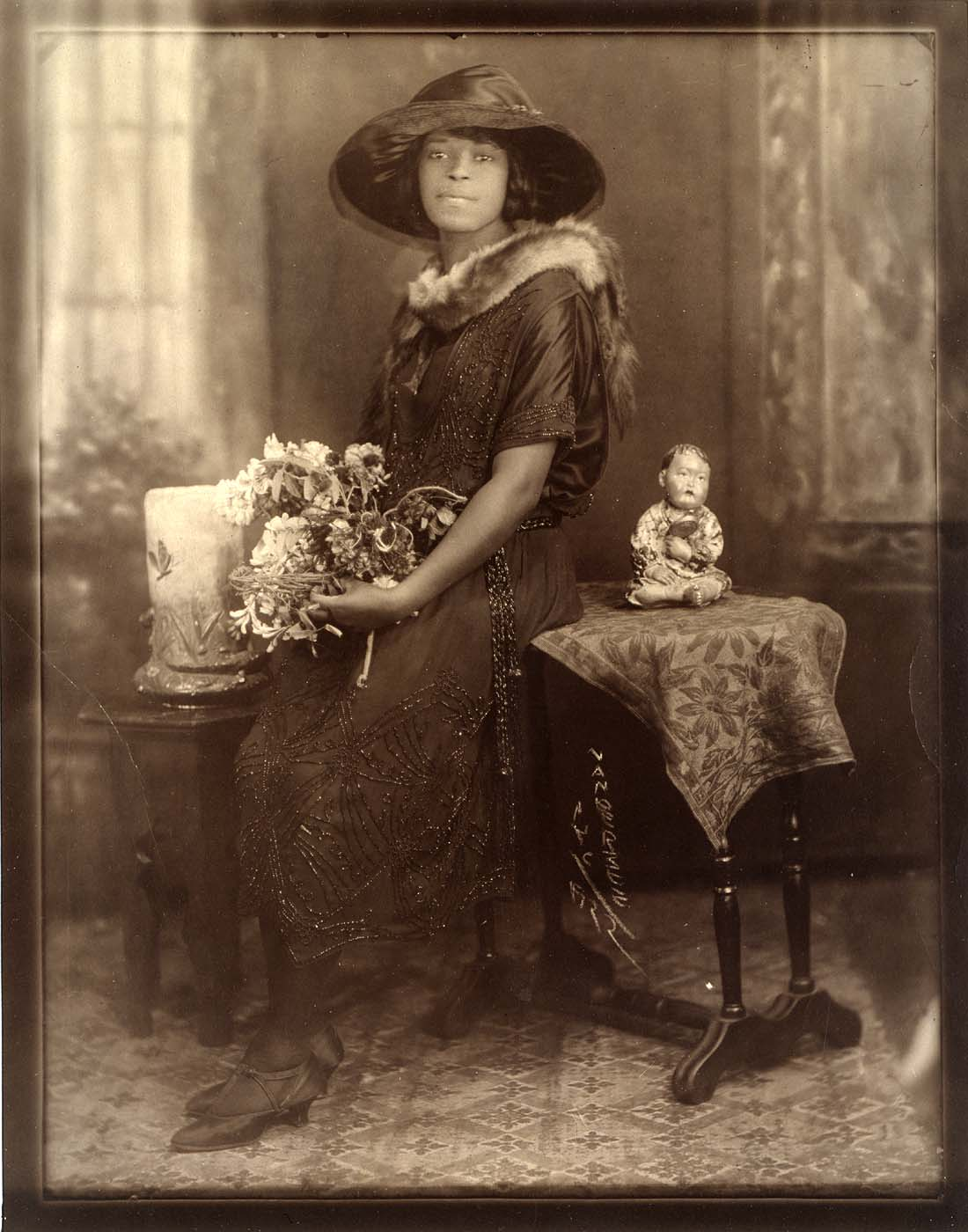
"Evening Attire", 1922, by Van Der Zee, in the collection of the Smithsonian American Art Museum

During the height of his popularity in 1927, his daughter Rachel, aged 19, died of appendicitis while in Portland, Maine. Van Der Zee photographed her funeral; he incorporated poems and heavenly imagery into the final prints.

During the 1920s and 1930s, he produced hundreds of photographs recording Harlem's growing middle class. Its residents entrusted the visual documentation of their weddings, funerals, celebrities and sports stars, and social life to his carefully composed images. Quickly Van Der Zee became the most successful photographer in Harlem. Among his many renowned subjects were poet Countee Cullen, dancer Bill ("Bojangles") Robinson, Charles M. "Daddy" Grace, Joe Louis, Florence Mills, and black nationalist leader Marcus Garvey. By the early 1930s Van Der Zee found it harder to make an income from his work in photography, partly because of the strained economic circumstances of many of his customers and partly because the growing popularity of personal cameras reduced the need for professional photography.

Van Der Zee worked predominantly in the studio and used a variety of props, including architectural elements, backdrops, and costumes, to achieve stylized tableaux vivant in keeping with late Victorian and Edwardian visual traditions. Sitters often copied celebrities of the 1920s and 1930s in their poses and expressions, and he retouched negatives and prints heavily to achieve an aura of glamour. He also created funeral photographs between the wars. These works were later collected in The Harlem Book of the Dead (1978), with a foreword by Toni Morrison.

In 1982, at age 96, Van Der Zee photographed 21-year-old painter Jean-Michel Basquiat for the January 1983 issue of Interview magazine.

Van Der Zee died in Washington, D.C., on May 15, 1983. Ten years later the National Portrait Gallery exhibited his work as a posthumous tribute. In 1984 Van Der Zee was inducted into the International Photography Hall of Fame and Museum.

== Works ==
=== Commission from UNIA ===
In the spring and summer of 1924, Van Der Zee worked to document the members and activities of Marcus Garvey's Universal Negro Improvement Association (UNIA). He took thousands of photographs on this assignment, some of which were featured in a calendar issued to members in 1925.

Fulfilling Garvey's wishes, Van Der Zee's job was to project a positive image of the Association, especially to emphasize the strength and social standing of its membership, the so-called Garveyites. Nowhere in Van Der Zee's visual record was there any hint of the controversy surrounding Garvey in the early 1920s, a period when the leader was subject to public interrogation, quarrels with the writer and philosopher W. E. B. Du Bois, and legal proceedings against him on charges of mail fraud.

=== Harlem on My Mind ===
In 1969, Van Der Zee gained worldwide recognition when his work was featured in the exhibition Harlem on My Mind: Cultural Capital of Black America, 1900–1968 at the Metropolitan Museum of Art in New York. His inclusion in the exhibition was somewhat by accident. In December 1967, a researcher for the exhibition (and a photographer in his own right), Reginald McGhee, came across Van Der Zee's Harlem studio and asked if he happened to have any photographs from the 1920s and '30s.

In a story recounted by photo historian Rodger C. Birt, Van Der Zee showed him the boxes and boxes of negatives he had kept from this period. These photographs would become the core of Harlem on My Mind—and the feature of the exhibit that critics routinely praised as the show's biggest revelation. As art historian Sharon Patton observed, Van Der Zee not only documented the Harlem Renaissance, but also helped create it.

Harlem on My Mind marked a controversy between the Met and a number of practicing artists then living and working in Harlem. Painters including Romare Bearden and Benny Andrews protested the show for its emphasis on social history and experience, at the expense—as they viewed it—of interest in the artistic legacy of black New York artists. The Metropolitan rejected Harlem residents from planning the exhibition and utilized photography as the sole method of representation, excluding all sculptures, paintings, drawings, and prints by Harlem artists. At the time, Harlem artists — and the art world at large — did not view photography as an art form, but as a form of documentation. In this way, the Metropolitan received criticism for framing Harlem as an ethnographic study rather than a living community with thriving artistry.

On opening day, a picket line formed in front of the Met. Andrews carried a sign reading: "Visit The Metropolitan Museum of Photography."

== Photographic techniques and artistry ==
Works by Van Der Zee are artistic as well as technically proficient. His work was in high demand, in part due to his experimentation and skill in double exposures and in retouching negatives of children. One theme that recurs in his photographs was the emergent black middle class, which he captured using traditional techniques in often idealistic images. Negatives were retouched to show glamor and an aura of perfection. This affected the likeness of the person photographed, but he felt each photo should transcend the subject.

His carefully posed family portraits reveal that the family unit was an important aspect of Van Der Zee's life. "I tried to see that every picture was better-looking than the person ... I had one woman come to me and say 'Mr. VanDerZee my friends tell that's a nice picture, but it doesn't look like you.' That was my style", said VanDerZee. Van Der Zee sometimes combined several photos in one image, for example by adding a ghostly child to an image of a wedding to suggest the couple's future, or by superimposing a funeral image upon a photograph of a dead woman to give the feeling of her eerie presence. Van Der Zee said, "I wanted to make the camera take what I thought should be there."

Van Der Zee was a working photographer who supported himself through portraiture, and he devoted time to his professional work before his more artistic compositions. Many famous residents of Harlem were among his subjects. In addition to portraits, Van Der Zee photographed organizations, events, and other businesses.

== Exhibitions ==
=== Solo exhibitions ===
Source (1970-1994 exhibitions):

- 1970: Lenox Library, Massachusetts
- 1971: Studio Museum in Harlem, New York
- 1974: Lunn Gallery/Graphics International, Washington, D.C.
- 1979: The Legacy of James Van Der Zee: A Portrait of Black Americans, Alternative Center for International Arts, New York and Delaware Art Museum, Wilmington
- 1983: Camera Club of New York and Idaho State University, Pocatello
- 1987: Deborah Sharp Gallery, New York
- 1994: Retrospective, National Portrait Gallery Washington, D.C., and Howard Greenberg Gallery, New York
- 2021-2022: James Van Der Zee’s Photographs: A Portrait of Harlem, National Gallery of Art, Washington, D.C.

=== Selected group exhibitions ===
- 1969: Harlem on My Mind: Cultural Capital of Black America 1900–1968, Metropolitan Museum of Art, New York
- 1978: Lunn Gallery, Washington, D.C.
- 1979: San Francisco Museum of Modern Art and Fleeting Gestures: Dance Photographs, International Center of Photography, New York (traveling)
- 1982: Rheinisches Landesmuseum, Bonn, Germany
- 1985: San Francisco Museum of Modern Art
- 1987: Studio Museum in Harlem, New York (traveling)

== Publications ==
- Liliane De Cock and Reginald McGhee, ed. (1973). James Van Der Zee. James Van Der Zee Institute. Morgan & Morgan. OCLC 470006297.
- Van Der Zee, James; Dodson, Owen; Billops, Camille (1978). The Harlem Book of the Dead. Morgan & Morgan. ISBN 9780871001528.

== See also ==
- List of people from Harlem
