= Hell-Bound Train =

1930 film

- Directed by: James Gist; Eloyce Gist
- Written by: James Gist; Eloyce Gist
- Release date: 1930
- Running time: 50 minutes
- Country: United States
- Language: Silent (English intertitles)

Hell-Bound Train

Hell-Bound Train is a 1930 silent Christian race film by self-taught African-American filmmakers James and Eloyce Gist, produced for their traveling ministry. The film is extant, and a 16mm print is preserved by the Library of Congress film archive.

In 2021, the film was selected for preservation in the United States National Film Registry by the Library of Congress as being "culturally, historically, or aesthetically significant".

== Plot ==
The film takes the viewer car-by-car down the "hell-bound train", to warn them against aspects of the popular culture that will lead them to sin, principal among them jazz music.

== Production ==
Due to low production values, the film was shot on handheld 16mm without audio or professional lighting, with characters played by friends and family of the Gists. Though Hell-Bound Train is believed to have been filmed prior to Eloyce's marriage to James, Eloyce reportedly had a significant part in the film's editing.

James and Eloyce Gist would go on to create at least two other silent morality films; Verdict: Not Guilty in 1933 and Heaven-Bound Travelers in 1935.

== Availability ==
The film was restored in 2016 by Kino Lorber and released on home video with a new score by Dr. Samuel Waymon as part of the five-disc Pioneers of African-American Cinema set.
