= Alyscia Cunningham =

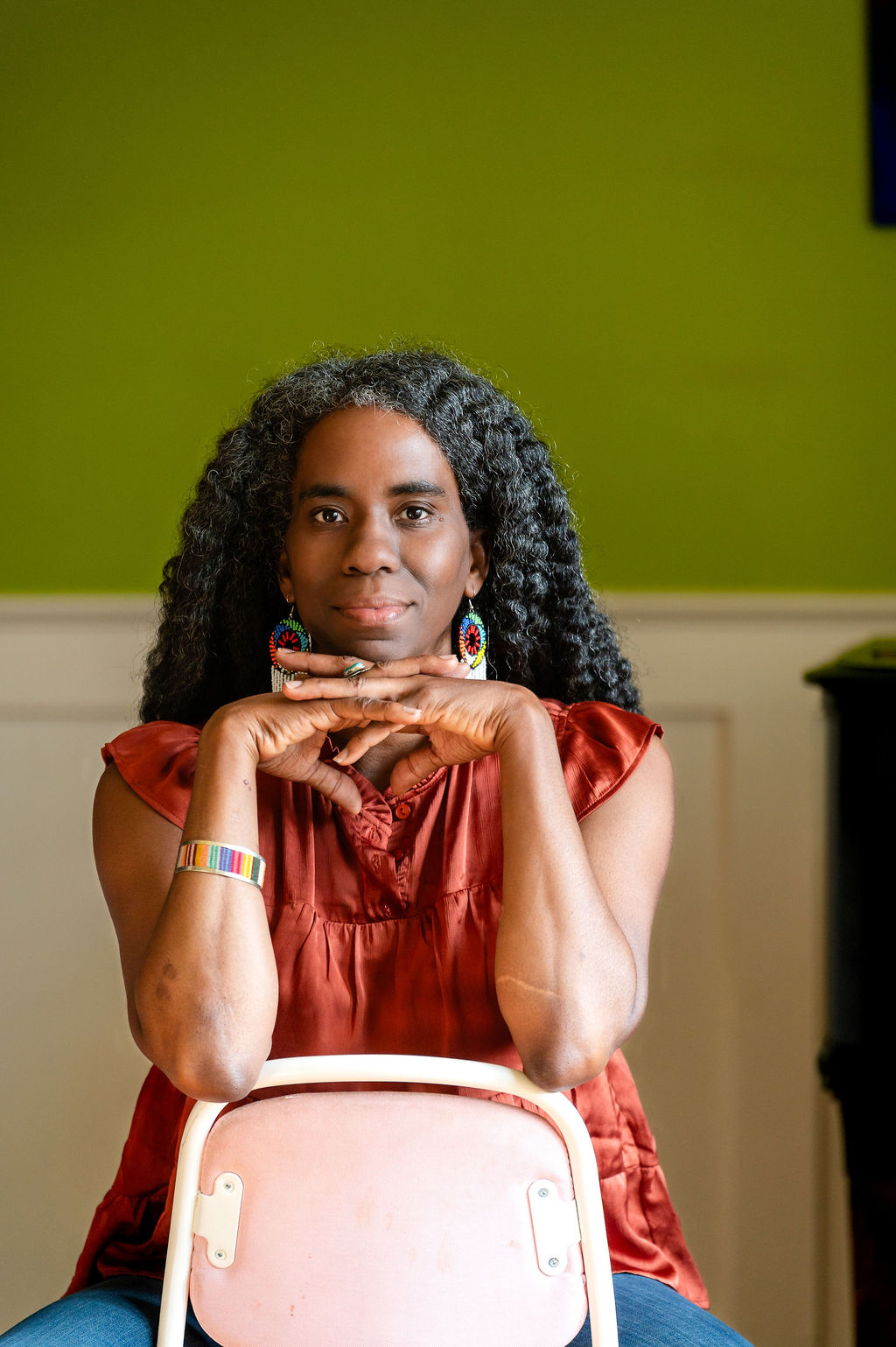
- Alyscia Cunningham
- Born: March 17, 1979 (age 47); Tacoma, Washington
- Citizenship: Trinidadian American
- Occupations: Author, film director, photographer, entrepreneur
- Known for: Douen, Feminine Transitions, I Am More Than My Hair

Alyscia Cunningham is an author, film director, tactile artist, and photographer who has contributed to the Smithsonian, National Geographic, AOL, and Discovery Channel. She is the founder of Her House Media, a production company dedicated to documentary and horror films by women of color. Her creative focus includes beauty, resilience, health, and cultural heritage, and has been featured in The Huffington Post, Cosmopolitan, The Washington Post, Fox 5, and ABC 7.

== Early life and education ==
Cunningham was born on March 17, 1979, at Madigan Army Medical Center in Tacoma, Washington. Her parents are originally from Trinidad and Tobago. Her father, Clyne Cunningham Sr. (also known as Clyne Ever), a visual artist and musician, was stationed there with the U.S. Army. At age two, the family moved to Germany for another assignment. Following her mother's stroke, Cunningham and her brothers—Clyne Cunningham Jr. (aka Composer Clyne) and Curt Cunningham (aka Charms the Fly Brat)—members of the hip-hop group Natural Mystics, relocated to Corona, Queens, New York, to live with their grandparents.

The family eventually settled in Maryland during Cunningham's teen years. She studied photography at Montgomery College, earning an Associate of Applied Science (AAS) degree in 2002.

== Career ==
Cunningham's projects highlight themes of beauty, identity, and cultural narrative. Her debut book, Feminine Transitions (2013), features unaltered portraits of women and girls, paired with personal reflections. It was featured in The Huffington Post, Cosmopolitan, and The Washington Post.

In 2018, she launched I Am More Than My Hair, a photo series and book capturing stories of women who experience hair loss. The accompanying documentary premiered at AFI in 2019.

To make her work more accessible, Cunningham incorporates audio description and tactile technology for audiences with visual impairment. She also delivered a TEDx talk titled “Making Art Accessible”.

In recent years, she transitioned into filmmaking. Her short narrative and documentary films include Annexation, Douen, Senses, Negro Mountain, Douen II, and Seeing Without Sight. Her House Media supports these projects with a focus on stories written and directed by women of color.

Cunningham is also a public speaker, addressing topics related to body image, race, and media representation. In 2017, she presented “Politics, Hair, and Body Image” at Saint Mary’s College of California.

== Awards and honors ==
- 2025 – Open Road Film Festival, Seeing Without Sight wins 1st place
- 2025 – Arts & Humanities Council of Montgomery County – FY25 Artists & Scholars Project Grant
- 2024 – Maryland State Arts Council – FY24 Creativity Grant Award
- 2023 – Renegade Film Festival – Best Short Screenplay for Senses
- 2022 – Pan African Film Festival – Best Documentary Short Nominee for I Am More Than My Hair
- 2021 – Forbes Next 1000 Honoree
- 2020 – New York Women in Film & Television – Loreen Arbus Disability Awareness Grant (Honorable Mention) for I Am More Than My Hair
- 2020 – American Express 100 for 100 Program – $25,000 grant recipient

== Selected works ==
- 2025 – Douen II – Narrative short (proof-of-concept)
- 2025 – Seeing Without Sight – Documentary short
- 2023 – Negro Mountain – Narrative short (proof-of-concept)
- 2022 – Senses – Narrative short
- 2021 – Douen – Narrative short film
- 2019 – I Am More Than My Hair – Documentary short
- 2018 – I Am More Than My Hair – Photography book
- 2013 – Feminine Transitions – Photography book
