= A Natural Born Shooter =

Short film

A Natural Born Shooter is a 1917 American short comedy film with an African American cast. It was a Historical Feature Film Company production. Management of one theater refused to show the film because of its degrading content.

Sources date the film variously to 1913, 1914, or 1917. An advertisement for the film states, "Make Funeral Arrangements Now, for you will die with laughter at this Colored Comedy Drama."
