= Maria P. Williams =

American film producer

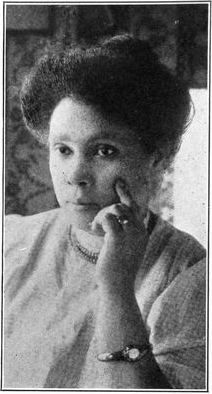
- Photo of Maria P. Williams, ca. 1916.
- Born: 1866; Versailles, Missouri
- Died: 1932 (aged 65–66); Kansas City, Missouri
- Occupations: Teacher, Actor, Activist, Director, Filmmaker, Editor, Author, Scriptwriter and Producer
- Known for: First film producer who was also Black and female
- Notable work: 1923's The Flames of Wrath
- Spouse(s): Jessie L. Williams (married 1891-1923); Ernest D. Linwood (married 1924-1932)

Maria Priscilla Thurston Williams (1866–1932) was a newspaper editor, film producer, author, and scriptwriter. She is credited as the first African-American woman film producer for the silent crime drama The Flames of Wrath in 1923. A one-time school teacher, Williams had a history of activism, independence and interest in the liberal arts, which led her first to newspapers, then lastly to film production, script-writing and acting. She wrote her memoir in 1916 titled My Work and Public Sentiment, in which she identified herself as a national organizer and speaker with the Good Citizens League, and stated that ten percent of the proceeds would go to suppressing crime among African Americans.

== History ==
Williams served as editor-in-chief (1891–1894) of the Kansas City weekly New Era. This spurred her to seek greater independence by founding, writing and editing her own newspaper, The Woman's Voice (1896–1900), "sponsored by the 'colored women's auxiliary' of the Republican Party; the paper was described as having "many pleasant things to say on a choice of timely topics.'" In 1916, Williams wrote and published her memoir.

Williams had been married since 1891 to entrepreneur Jesse L. Williams, who owned a movie theater among several other businesses in Kansas City. The pair co-managed the movie theater, which gave the couple experience in the distribution and release of films for African-American audiences. With Williams serving both as the company's secretary and treasurer, the couple went on to co-found Western Film Producing Co. and Booking Exchange, and Williams went on to write the script for The Flames of Wrath, produce a film from the script and play the role of prosecuting attorney in the five-reel film. That same year, Williams' husband died, and she later went on to marry another man named Ernest D. Linwood.

She died in 1932, after being "called away from her home by a stranger who requested help for his ill brother. She was found shot to death on the side of a road several miles from her home. The murder remains unsolved."

Ironically, the plot for The Flames of Wrath concerns the investigation of a murder after a robbery. Aimee Dixon Anthony stated that Williams could also reasonably be considered the film's director, given how undifferentiated the two roles were at that time. That distinction is typically granted to Tressie Souders, however, who served as director of 1922's A Woman's Error, but there is no evidence Souders' film was ever released.

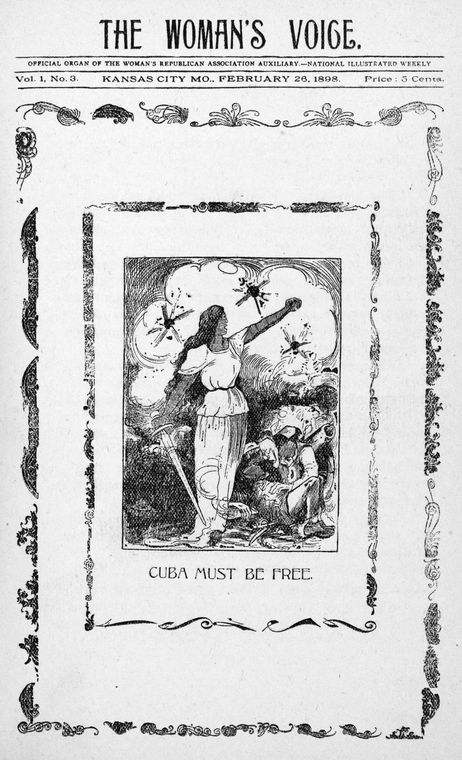
Title page of Women's Voice (1896–1900).

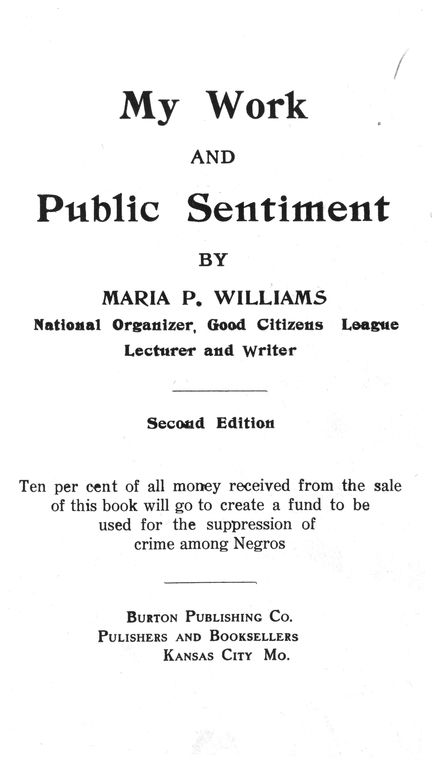
Title page to My Work and Public Sentiment.

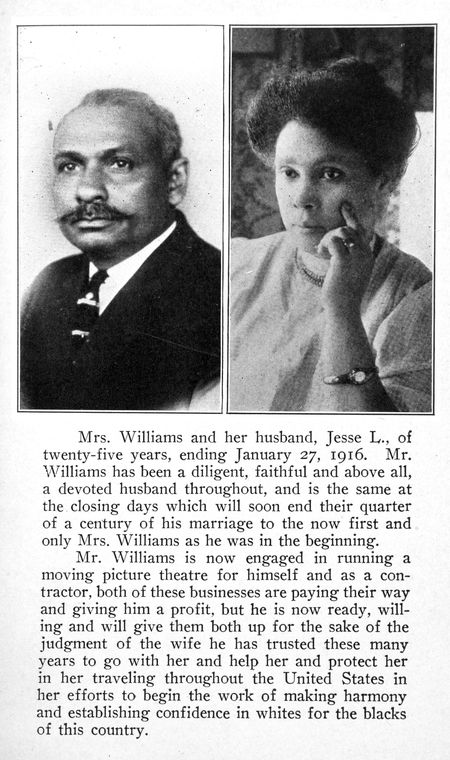
A partial article about Williams and her husband Jessie L. Williams, a theater owner.

== See also ==
=== Black women film pioneers ===
- A website for Sisters in Cinema Documentary: A History of African American Women Feature Film Directors
- Black Film Archive: A showcase for Black films made from 1915 to 1979
- Columbia University on Women Film Pioneer Project: African-American Women in the Silent Film Industry
- The Atlantic on When Hollywood's Power Players Were Women
- Greenlight Women on Celebrating Black Female Directors and Actresses over 40

=== Early Black film ===
- African American cinema
- Black women film pioneers
- Pioneers of African-American Cinema
- Race film
