= Richard D. Maurice =

American film director

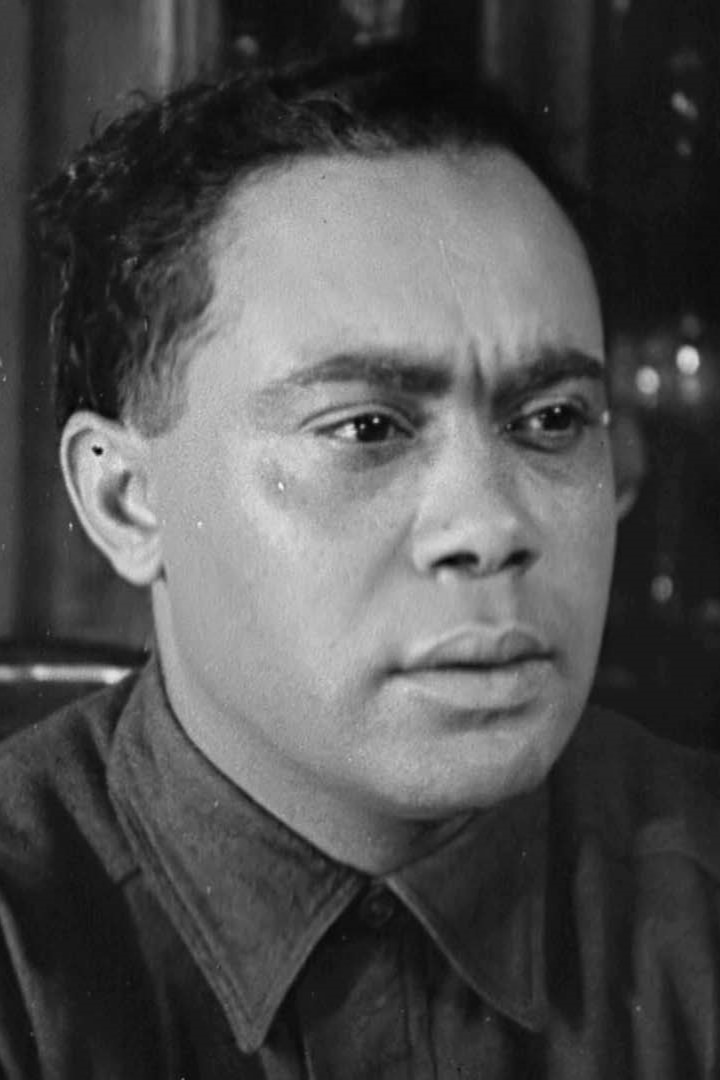
- Richard D. Maurice in a scene from the film Eleven P.M.
- Born: June 14, 1893; Matanzas, Cuba
- Died: February 5, 1955 (aged 61); New York City
- Occupations: Film director, union organizer
- Notable work: Eleven P.M.
- Spouse: Vivian Irene "Birdie I." Madison
- Children: Richard D. Maurice, Jr. (b. 1916); Wanda Irene Maurice (b. 1923)

Richard D. Maurice (June 14, 1893 – February 5, 1955) was a pioneering filmmaker during the silent era. Later, he became involved in labor organizing and helped found the Dining Car and Railroad Food Workers union. He was of African descent.

== Early years ==
Richard Danal Maurice was born in Matanzas, Cuba on June 14, 1893. In 1903, Maurice immigrated to the United States. He lived in Detroit, where he owned a tailor's shop.

== Entertainment career ==
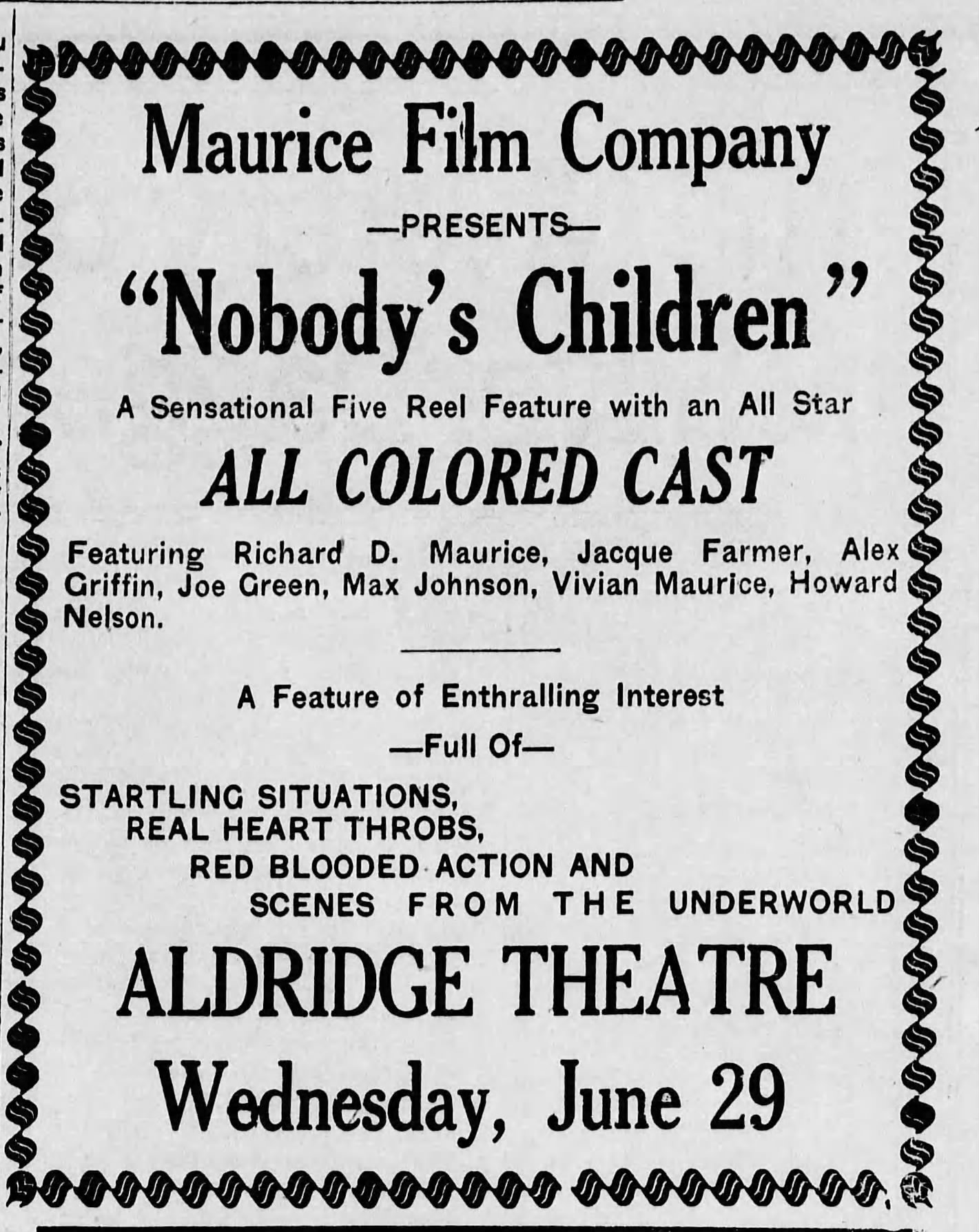
Advertisement for the film, Nobody's Children

In July 1920, he founded the Maurice Film Company. Its offices were at 184 High Street in Detroit. The film production company released two feature films almost ten years apart. Nobody's Children (originally titled, "Our Christianity and Nobody's Child"), the company's first feature, premiered at E. B. Dudley's Vaudette Theatre in Detroit on Monday, September 27, 1920, and played widely within the eastern United States. While extensive documentation exists regarding the release of Nobody's Children, no prints are known to exist.

Very little is known about the release of Eleven P.M., Maurice's second and only known surviving feature. It is generally dated 1928, but Pearl Bowser and Charles Musser in their essay, "Richard D. Maurice and the Maurice Film Company," speculate that the experimental film may have been completed the following year or possibly even 1930 because it "possesses a cinematic style and internal evocations of other race films" of the period. Historian Henry T. Sampson described it as one of the most outstanding black films of the silent era. Bowser and Musser also praise the film by stating, "Maurice's innovative use of cinematography—location filming, unusual angles, and tracking shots as well as special, almost surrealist effects—distinguish the film from its surviving counterparts of race cinema."

His involvement in the motion picture industry lasted at least until the early 1930s. He's listed as a motion picture producer in the 1930 U.S. Census. By 1936, when his daughter Wanda was baptized, he was apparently living in New York City.

== Involvement in organized labor ==
In 1940, Maurice became involved in dining-car service as a waiter for the Atlantic Coast Line Railroad in New York City. Following his move three years later to the New York Central Railroad in the same capacity, he helped found the Dining Car and Railroad Food Workers union, local 370.

In 1946, Maurice began to have major disagreements with the union. His dissatisfaction with the union culminated in an op-ed piece published in the Amsterdam News in which he accused the union leadership of being ineffective in representing the rights of rank-and-file workers.

In August 1951, after he left the union, Maurice testified before a subcommittee of the Senate Judiciary Committee, headed by Senator James O. Eastland of Mississippi. The Subcommittee Investigating Subversive Influence in the Dining Car and Railroad Food Workers Union also included Senator Pat McCarran of Nevada and Senator Arthur V. Watkins of Utah. The subcommittee was formed in the wake of the Internal Security Act. During his testimony, Maurice accused Solon C. Bell, the union's president, and several key union officials of being affiliated with the Communist Party.

He died in New York City on February 5, 1955.

== Filmography ==
Eleven P.M. (1928)

- Nobody's Children (1920) considered lost
- Home Brew (1920) [short]
- Eleven P.M. (1928)

== Legacy ==
A 2020 screening by a historical society with a panel discussion was scheduled but postponed due to the Covid epidemic.
