= Solomon Sir Jones =

American film director (1869–1936)

Solomon Sir Jones (1869–1936) was an American minister and amateur film-maker, best known for his collection of 29 silent black-and-white films (totaling 355 minutes' worth of footage) documenting African-American communities in Oklahoma from 1924 to 1928. In 2016, Jones's films were selected for preservation in the United States National Film Registry by the Library of Congress as being "culturally, historically, or aesthetically significant".

== Films ==
Jones's films consist of 29 silent black-and-white films documenting African-American communities in Oklahoma from 1924 to 1928. They contain 355 minutes of footage shot with then-new 16 mm cameras. The films document a rich tapestry of everyday life: funerals, sporting events, schools, parades, businesses, Masonic meetings, river baptisms, families at home, African-American oil barons and their wells, black colleges, Juneteenth celebrations, and a transcontinental footrace. Jones's films have been preserved by the Smithsonian Institution, the Beinecke Rare Book & Manuscript Library of the Yale University Library, and the National Museum of African American History and Culture. They are considered to be "the most extensive film records we have of Southern and urban black life and culture at the time of rapid social and cultural change for African-Americans during the 1920s, the very beginning of the Great Migration, which transformed not only black people as a whole, but America itself."

== Personal life ==
In addition to his work with film, Jones was a businessman and a Baptist minister, who either established or was the pastor of some 15 churches in his lifetime. He was the son of ex-slaves, was born in Tennessee and grew up in the South, before moving to Oklahoma, where he lived for most of his life. Jones spent the next several decades building black institutions; establishing churches, newspapers, and businesses; and supporting the activities of schools and hospitals. Jones also remained active in church politics, holding leadership roles in the National Baptist Convention of America, one of the largest African American denominations in the United States, for many years.

Jones was a fierce defender of black institutions, one of many African American leaders in Oklahoma who supported what came to be called “All-Black towns,” municipalities occupied and governed by black settlers. One of these towns was targeted in 1921 by white mobs for one of the worst racist attacks in American history, referred to as the Tulsa race massacre. More than 800 people were admitted to hospitals and as many as 6,000 black residents were interned in large facilities, many of them for several days. The Oklahoma Bureau of Vital Statistics officially recorded 36 dead. A 2001 state commission examination of events was able to confirm that of the 36 dead, 26 were black and 10 white, based on contemporary autopsy reports, death certificates and other records.

Jones was well traveled, traveling across not only the United States, but also overseas to France, England, Palestine, Switzerland, Italy, North Africa, and Germany, filming his travels along the way. These films were only slightly less significant than Jones's films of Oklahoma, which still serve as a visual commemoration of the thirty-five years he spent advocating for African American people and institutions in Oklahoma.
