= Jacqueline Bobo =

American feminist studies academic

- Education: University of California (BA); San Francisco State University (MA); University of Oregon (PhD)
- Occupations: Professor; author
- Known for: Black Women as Cultural Readers (1996)

Jacqueline Bobo is Chair and Associate Professor of Women's Studies at the University of California, Santa Barbara. Bobo has been recognized as an "internationally renowned writer" and black feminist scholar.

== Education ==
Bobo earned her undergraduate degree from the University of California, Los Angeles in 1971, her Masters in 1980 at San Francisco State University, and her PhD in film and television at the University of Oregon in 1989.

== Career ==
Bobo has worked on studying the response of Black women for films such as Daughters of the Dust, The Color Purple, Gone with the Wind, Civil Brand, To Kill a Mockingbird, and Claudine. She interviewed a group of selected Black women and asked them how they felt about their portrayal in the 1985 film The Color Purple. She has analyzed the language used in media representing Black women and how it has changed within the last century. Bobo's observations contextualize the historical aspects perceived in these media outlets. Bobo's work in Black Women as Cultural Readers is regarded as a "seminal stud[y] helping critics and other readers better understand large groups of women who have heretofore been made invisible in academia".

In Black Feminist Cultural Criticism, Bobo's essays explore multiple perspectives on black feminist cultural studies, both from an academic perspective and an everyday perspective. Bobo's writings have been compared to Feminist Theory: From Margin to Center, written by bell hooks, as both works explore black feminist theory: "Each author contributes to a collective project of feminist canon formation and points toward the future of scholarship by and about black women."

== Selected works ==
=== Articles ===
- Bobo, Jacqueline (Spring 1989). "Sifting Through the Controversy: Reading The Color Purple". Callaloo (39): 332–342. doi:10.2307/2931568. JSTOR 2931568.
- Bobo, Jacqueline (Summer 1991). ""The Subject is Money": Reconsidering the Black Film Audience as a Theoretical Paradigm". Black American Literature Forum. 50 (4): 421–432. doi:10.2307/3041699. JSTOR 3041699.
- Bobo, J.; Seiter, E. (Fall 1991). ""Black feminism and media criticism: "The Women of Brewster Place"". Screen. 32 (3): 286–302. doi:10.1093/screen/32.3.286 – via Oxford University Press Journals.
- "Civil Brand (2002) and the Prison Industrial Complex". Communication, Culture & Critique. 1 (1): 63–71. March 2018 – via EBSCOhost Communication & Mass Media Complet.

=== Books ===
- Articulation and Hegemony: Black Women's Response to the Film The Color Purple (PhD thesis). University of Oregon. 1989. OCLC 21321579.
- Black Women as Cultural Readers. New York: Columbia University Press. 1995. ISBN 9780231083942.
- Black Women Film and Video Artists. New York: Routledge. 1998. ISBN 9780415920414.
- Black Feminist Cultural Criticism. Maiden, Massachusetts: Blackwell. 2001. ISBN 9780631222392. OCLC 44683443.
