= Mercy, the Mummy Mumbled =

1918 comedy film

- Directed by: Ralph J. Phillips
- Written by: C. A. Frambers; Bob Horner
- Produced by: Luther Pollard
- Cinematography: C. C. Fetty
- Production company: Ebony Film Corporation
- Release date: 1918
- Running time: 12
- Country: United States
- Language: Silent (English intertitles)

Mercy, the Mummy Mumbled

Mercy, the Mummy Mumbled is a 1918 short comedy film directed by Ralph J. Phillips and produced by the Ebony Film Corporation. A 35mm print is preserved in the Library of Congress film archive.

== Plot ==
A young man hatches a plan to sell a fake mummy to a professor of Egyptology in order to have enough money to marry the professor's daughter.

== Cast ==
- Mattie Edwards as Lulu, the Professor's Daughter
