= A Reckless Rover =

1918 film by C. N. David

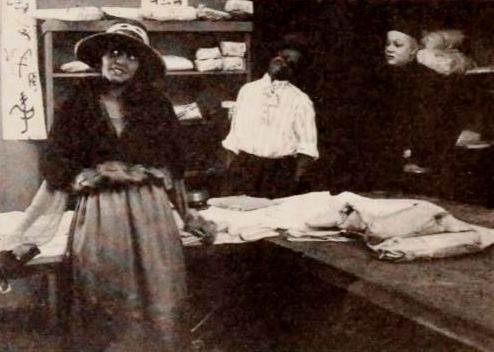
- Still from the film
- Directed by: Charles N. David
- Produced by: Luther J. Pollard
- Starring: Sam Robinson
- Cinematography: C. C. Fetty
- Production company: Ebony Film Corporation
- Release date: 1918
- Running time: 14 minutes
- Country: United States
- Language: Silent (English intertitles)

A Reckless Rover is an American 1918 short comedy film produced by Ebony Film Corporation and starring Sam Robinson. The film is extant.

== Plot ==
Waking to find that his landlady has called in a policeman to collect his overdue rent, the slothful but cunning Rastus Jones (Sam Robinson) slips out the window and hides out in a Chinese laundry, where he proceeds to cause chaos.

== Cast ==
- Sam Robinson as Rastus Jones
- Yvonne Junior (uncredited)
- Samuel Jacks (uncredited)

== Response ==
The July 6, 1918 edition of the Exhibitors Herald reviewed the film, stating that: "The company of negro players, reinforced by a number of new faces, succeeds in introducing what is said to be some of the liveliest comedy ever seen in a production of this character, with its slapstick humor developed to the highest pitch of interest. The leading comedian has been given a greater opportunity than ordinarily."
