= I Am More Than My Hair =

- Directed by: Alyscia Cunningham
- Written by: Alyscia Cunningham
- Produced by: Alyscia Cunningham
- Starring: Various interviewees
- Release date: 2019
- Running time: 29 minutes
- Country: United States
- Language: English

I Am More Than My Hair is a documentary film and photography book created by Alyscia Cunningham, released in 2019. The project features interviews with females who have experienced hair loss (alopecia) due to a health-related condition and their journeys of self-empowerment to see beauty beyond the media's standards.

The documentary won Best Documentary Short award at the Through Women’s Eyes’ International Film Festival 2020.

== Overview ==
The film includes interviews with women and girls who lost their hair due to health-related conditions, including autoimmune, chemotherapy, and other medical conditions, or cut their hair in solidarity of a loved one. It documents their personal stories and how they learned to embrace their identities without conforming to the conventional standards of beauty often promoted by mainstream media.

In addition to the film, I Am More Than My Hair was also released as a photography book, featuring portrait-style photographs taken by Cunningham alongside excerpts from each interview. The book was published in 2018.

== Screenings and Exhibitions ==
- The film has been screened at museums, libraries, and film festivals, including the Sandy Spring Museum, the Women's Museum of California, and other community events.
- The photo series has been exhibited at art institutions and galleries throughout the United States.

== See also ==
- Alopecia areata
- Body image
- Women's empowerment
