= Eldred Kurtz Means =

American Methodist Episcopal clergyman, public speaker and author

Eldred Kurtz Means (March 11, 1878 – February 19, 1957) was an American Methodist Episcopal clergyman, famed public speaker, and author. A white man, he wrote fictional stories about African/African American characters who lived in an area of Louisiana which he named Tickfall. He described the characters in the most grotesque, comical and sensational terms. His magazine stories were compiled into books. He was a constant and prolific contributor to Frank A. Munsey's pulp magazines such as All-Story Weekly, Argosy and its predecessors. His use of black stereotypes, minstrel show motifs, Jim Crow characters, fantastical mimicry and impressionism of Negro dialect made him a popular author with a niche of white audiences; but the implicit racist message has not aged well.

== Early life ==
Means was born in Taylor County, Kentucky, the son of Virginia (née Lively) Means and George Hamilton Means. He married Ella Q. Crebbin in Monroe, Louisiana.

== Ministry ==
Means received a Doctor of Divinity, Centenary College of Louisiana.

He had a far flung clerical career, involving more than a dozen posts:

- 1899 Ordained ministry Methodist Episcopal Church, South,
- 1899–1900, Pastor Ghent, Kentucky
- 1901, Erlanger
- 1902, Hodgenville
- 1903–1905, Louisiana Avenue Church, New Orleans
- 1905–1909, Baton Rouge
- 1909–1913, Minden
- 1913–1915, Shreveport
- 1915–1917, Arcadia
- 1917–1921, Monroe
- 1922–1925, Galloway Memorial Church, Jackson, Mississippi
- 1925–1929, Court St. Church, Lynchburg, Virginia
- 1929–1933 Main Street Methodist Episcopal Church South, Danville, Virginia
- 1933–1937, Travis Street Church, Sherman, Texas
- 1937–1939, First Church, Helena, Arkansas
- 1939–1944, Central Methodist Church, Rogers, Arkansas

He was a Democrat.

== Literary work ==
Over more than a half century, he wrote scores of short stories for pulp fiction magazines. A fairly complete listing of his published stories appears in the following reference. In 1924, Irvin S. Cobb, an American humorist, numbered Means’s “darky stories” among his favorites. In the Fort Worth Star-Telegram, he wrote: "[Means] is at home in Jackson, Miss. ... and pastor of Galloway Memorial Church M.E., South. ... He is a zealous clergyman, a gifted speaker, and a fluent writer, but being, as befits a clergyman, a truthful man also, Mr. Means would lay no claim to great personal beauty."

Means defended his use of dialect, persons and places as being true-to-type with verisimilitude to a passing and important lifestyle and culture. He claimed a love for the people — the musicality and rhythm of their language, and professed a linguist's and an anthropologist's intent to preserve transitory culture and cultural artifacts — which were in imminent danger of extirpation, as the shadow of slavery waned in the distance.

The publisher G.P. Putnam's Sons promoted him as part of its stable of authors highlighting white supremacy over other races.

In 1918, an Ebony Film Corporation advertisement teased a coming film based on one of his Tickfall Tales titled Good Luck in Old Clothes. The film was produced and promoted as exemplifying "wholesome real droll Negro humor."

In addition to his short stories, he had several books published. Edward Winsor Kemble — well known for his racist caricatures — illustrated several of his books. His books were reviewed in several newspapers.

== Reception ==
Reviews of his works at the time were mixed, with the New York Tribune giving a favorable report. In contrast, the Brooklyn Daily Eagle wrote: “There are, among the better writers of today, three who can write negro stories with humor and understanding, and E.K. Means is not one of them”. Several of his books, having gone out of copyright, have been reproduced by various republishers.

Means touted 'lack of titles' on three of his books was not universally welcomed. A New York Times reviewer castigated the third in the series: "The crass lack of good taste, and worse than crass conceit shown by the title of this volume, are not-redeemed by any remarkable quality in its content."

His story "At the End of the Rope" contains the earliest known usage of the saying: If it wasn't for bad luck I wouldn't have any luck at all.

He was one of the earliest recognized users of the word "doodlebug".

== Works (in chronological order) ==
- Means, Eldred Kurtz (November 17, 2011) [1918]. Negro Stories (Paperback). Nabu Press. ISBN 978-1-272-00944-1.
- Means, E.K.; Kemble, Edward Winsor, Illustrator. (1918) E. K. Means: Is This a Title? It Is Not. It Is the Name of a Writer of Negro Stories, Who Has Made Himself So Completely the Writer of Negro Stories That His Book Needs No Title New York, London: The Knickerbocker Press, G. P. Putnam's Sons
- Means, E.K.; Kemble, Edward Winsor, Illustrator. (1919) More E. K. Means: Is This a Title? It Is Not. It Is the Name of a Writer of Negro Stories, Who Has Made Himself So Completely the Writer of Negro Stories That His Second Book Needs No Title New York, London: The Knickerbocker Press, G. P. Putnam's Sons
- Means, E.K.; Kemble, Edward Winsor, Illustrator. (1920) Is This a Title? It Is Not. It Is the Name of a Writer of Negro Stories, Who Has Made Himself So Completely the Writer of Negro Stories That This Third Book, Like the First and Second, Needs No Title New York, London: The Knickerbocker Press, G. P. Putnam's Sons
- Abdullah, Achmed; Brand, Max; Means, E.K.; Sheehan, Perley Poore (1920). The Ten Foot Chain: Can Love Survive the Shackles? — A Unique Symposium. New York: Reynolds Publishing Company.
- “At the End of the Rope” by E. K. Means, Munsey's Magazine, New York (1927)
- Means, E.K. (1931). Black Fortune. New York: Brentano's.
- Means, Eldred Kurtz (1957). Sunset Gun: The Public Addresses of Eldred K. Means. United States: Comet Press Books.

== See also ==
- All-Negro Comics
- Cultural appropriation
- Helen Bannerman
- Tickfaw, Louisiana
