= Tactile technology =

Integration of multi-sensory triggers within physical objects

Tactile technology is the integration of multi-sensory triggers within physical objects, allowing "real world" interactions with technology. It is similar to haptic technology, as both focus on touch interactions with technology, but whereas haptic is simulated touch, tactile is physical touch. Rather than using a digital interface to interact with the physical world, as augmented reality does, tactile technology involves a physical interaction that triggers a digital response.

== Benefits ==
The word "tactile" means "related to the sense of touch" or "that can be perceived by the touch; tangible". Touch is incredibly important to human communication and learning, but increasingly, most of the content people interact with is purely visual. Tactile technology presents a way to use advances in technology and combined with touch.

Studies show that humans work and learn better in a multi-sensory environment. Something as simple as having toys (like the fidget spinner) in the workplace, or using physical props to teach children in schools, can have significant impacts on productivity and information retention according to the multisensory learning theory.

As stated in one article, "Many teachers are turning to tactile learning and evolving technologies as a way to engage students across different learning styles and needs. As part of a multi-sensory learning approach, tactile technology can help students across a range of skill development areas and a broad range of subjects".

== Implementations ==
=== Buttons ===
At the simplest level, a physical trigger that can be used to create a technological reaction is nothing new: it can be as basic as a button or switch.

More modern versions of buttons include conductive paint and projectors - both are tools that can make a non-digital surface act like a touchscreen, turning anything from tables to sculptures into interactive displays.

- Fujitsu Laboratories uses projectors to turn a physical piece of information into a digital file. A user can mark a field to copy or display from a piece of paper with their finger, and the projector will copy that area into a digital file.
- Lü - projection games for school

=== Gaming ===
Games are an example of a field that transformed from entirely tactile to largely digital, and where the trend is now turning back to a more multi-sensory experience. With video games, players want the element of touch that controllers provide, while researchers suggest that incorporating an element of physical interaction to digital games for children may mitigate concerns about excessive screen-time. For example:

- Microsoft developed a mat called Project Zanzibar that uses capacitive touch and NFC technology to track objects placed on it and to record movements. By playing with physical toys on the mat, children can make movies or play games with visual and sound effects on a Microsoft tablet. There are also educational activities; the child can trace a letter on a physical card placed on the mat and the digital screen will mimic their gesture to make sure it was correct. This is a way for children to play with physical toys while still benefiting from the vast information available on a digital device.
- Similarly, Lego has a product called Lego Fusion that lets children build using physical toys and then scan their creation into an app - they can then interact with the world they created digitally and share it with friends.
- Keyboard companies have experimented with creating inflatable buttons for phones, that have been designed for those who miss the tangible aspect of typing or playing games. Logitech also recently game out with a keyboard that includes a large button/ dial for increased tangible control.

=== Textiles ===
Technology is increasingly being incorporated into physical objects that we already use - and one of the most significant examples of this is in the textile industry. Companies are creating curtains that control light or detect smoke, clothing that monitors temperature, or fabric that integrates lighting. This is a swiftly growing field of "smart" apparel and home goods. This is also an example of wearable technology.

=== Art installations and museums ===
In order to experience art or communicate information, art galleries and museums are increasingly incorporating technology, especially as it makes art and education more immersive and personalized.

- The Tate created the Sensorium, an art display that included all five senses.
- teamLab Borderless Digital Art Museum
- The Rain Room in the Barbican Centre in London - people walking through the space control the experience through their motion, as they walk through a rainfall but don't get wet. "The unique installation is yet another example of how the role of digital technology is taking audience participation, response and interaction to the next level within the world of art. The audience's response becomes a crucial part of the installation, as the rainfall responds to their reactions through motorised mirrors, and in this way the audience become the subject of the artwork".
- Brands using digital art and interactive digital experiences to engage consumers. Perrier, for example, had an interactive art wall for attendees to draw on.
- SXSW combining art, cutting-edge technology, and multi-sensory interaction.
