= Jennie Louise Touissant Welcome =

American film director (1885–1956)

Madame E. Toussaint Welcome
- Born: Jane Louise Van Der Zee; January 10, 1885; Lenox, Massachusetts, US
- Died: July 22, 1956 (aged 71); New York City, New York, US
- Spouse: Ernest Touissant Welcome

Jennie Louise Touissant Welcome (January 10, 1885 – July 22, 1956), born Jennie Louise Van Der Zee and also known as Madame E. Toussaint Welcome, was an African American visual artist who made influential photographs and films with her husband. She is associated with the Harlem Renaissance. Van Der Zee, who referred to herself as "the foremost female artist of the race," is recognized as being one of the only African American women filmmakers from the silent film industry.

She and her husband, Ernest Touissant Welcome, established their own art school, photographic studio, and film production business. They produced films and paintings of African American soldiers of World War I. The film, a 12-part documentary, was titled Doing Their Bit.

== Early life ==
Van Der Zee was born in Lenox, Massachusetts, to John Van Der Zee and Susan Brister. Before moving to Lenox, Massachusetts, her parents were maid and butler in New York to President Ulysses S. Grant. Jennie attended Lenox High School and took private lessons in art and music in Pittsfield, Massachusetts. Early in the 20th century, she moved to New York with her father and brothers (one of whom, James Van Der Zee, became a photographer).

She married Ernest Touissant Welcome, an inventor and entrepreneur, on January 10, 1910, and they moved into in a brownstone in New York City, where they established the Touissant Conservatory of Art and Music. The first ad for the conservatory appeared in the first issue of the NAACP's journal The Crisis. Van Der Zee stood out during her time because she was the African American owner of a business in Harlem.

== Photography and filmmaking ==
The couple made films and pictures that recognized African American contributions to World War I. Under the banner of the Touissant Motion Picture Exchange, they made Doing Their Bit in 1918. Between 1917 and 1918, The Touissant Pictorial Company published A Pictorial History of the Negro in the Great War, a memorial book that featured Jennie's work. It also included pictures from governmental sources and a few uncredited photos. Several libraries have the book.

The Touissant Pictorial Company published one million patriotic postcards of African American soldiers. After the war ended, the War Savings Stamp Committee accepted Van Der Zee's painting, Charge of the Colored Divisions, for use as a poster. Van Der Zee and her husband copyrighted the work in August 1918. No physical copies are known to exist.

One of their most popular lithographs depicted members of the 369th Colored Infantry engaged in hand-to-hand combat with Germans; names of individual soldiers were given.

== Death ==
Van Der Zee died in 1956.
