= Two Knights of Vaudeville =

American 1915 short comedy film

Two Knights of Vaudeville (1915)

Two Knights of Vaudeville is an American 1915 short comedy film with an African American cast. Luther Pollard produced and Ebony Film Corporation distributed the film. Jimmy Marshall, Frank Montgomery, and Florence McClain star in the film. A vaudeville spoof, it is preserved at the Library of Congress.

Montgomery and McClain were married performers.

== See also ==
- African American cinema
