= Eloyce King Patrick Gist =

American Filmmaker

Eloyce King Patrick Gist (October 21, 1892 – 1974) was an American film director, screenwriter, producer, author, and pianist. She made films with her husband including Hell Bound Train (1930) and Verdict Not Guilty (1933) and toured the United States showing them and working to inspire morality with them.

== Early life and education ==
Eloyce King Patrick Gist was born October 21, 1892, in Hitchcock, Texas, to Walter and Josephine King. Around the turn of the century, the family relocated to Washington, D.C., a community Gist would remain involved with for the remainder of her life. Gist received a degree in music at Howard University.

After college, she studied beauty culture and founded the Patrick School of Beauty Culture and Personal Improvements. Around this time that Eloyce met and married her second husband, James Gist, and the two began collaborating on films. The two shared passions for religion; James was a devoted Christian evangelist, while Eloyce was a member of the Baháʼí Faith. Despite their differences in denomination, the Gists agreed on the tenets of Christianity, specifically in regards to morality, spirituality, personal and community improvement, and the punishment of evil deeds.

== Filmmaking ==
Hell-Bound Train (1930), co-directed with James Gist

The pair began to make films with stories of immorality and divine judgement that were designed to scare their audience into adopting a morally righteous and devoutly Christian way of life. The Gists showed their films to church audiences across the nation. Eloyce would play piano, followed by a sermon by James. Their first film was Hell Bound Train; it is their only feature, with a runtime of 50 minutes. While the division of labor in the Gist partnership is unknown, it is known that the script was originally James's, but Eloyce rewrote it, and oversaw reshoots. The film follows a train being steered by The Devil to Hell, carrying damned sinners in each of its cars; each car is designated for specific types of sinners. Eloyce used religious symbolism and symbolism frequently found African American folktales to make their films more accessible and understandable to audiences, such as the train, a symbolic representation of a transportive device that takes the individual away into salvation, or in this case, damnation. The film was shot with a handheld camera on 16mm black and white film, and travelled with the Gist's across the country. It currently survives in restored form in the Library of Congress; its restored version was shown on the Pioneers of African American Cinema box set.

The Gist's second film was Verdict Not Guilty, a short film that, like their previous film, focuses on religious themes; here, a woman who has died during childbirth faces judgement, where Truth defends her against Satan. Along with Hell Bound Train, the Gist's toured the country showing their films and sermons; there was potentially a third film that was shown as well, however its existence has never been proven. These travels were eventually sponsored by the NAACP; there is correspondence between Roy Wilkins and Irving S. Hammer, the then field secretary of the NAACP, that shows how well received the Gist's films were. Hammer writes of James,

"Mr. Gist is a producer of religious motion pictures which have an entire Negro cast and for the past four days we at the Harlem branch have done business with him and have found him a Negro of high caliber, also his picture “VERDICT NOT GUILTY” represents an ambitious effort and one worth while seeing.".

While there is no mention of Eloyce in these letters, and later letters between James and Wilkins, it can be inferred that Eloyce still contributed heavily, as James's never refers to the films as his, rather, he refers to them as "ours".

== Later life ==
After James's death from pneumonia in 1940, Eloyce ceased making films; the immense workload of production, directing, editing, distribution, and presentation proved too much for her to do alone. Eloyce spent the remainder of her life writing and spending time with her family; she wrote a novel, and occasionally contributed newspaper articles to local D.C. papers, before her sudden death while on vacation in 1974.

== Filmography ==
Year	Title	Type
1930	Hell Bound Train	feature
1933	Verdict Not Guilty	short
