= Tressie Souders =

American film director

- Born: Theresa Ann Souders; February 7, 1897; Frankfort, Kansas, US
- Died: January 17, 1995 (aged 97); San Francisco, California, US
- Other names: Tressie Souders, Tressa Souders, Theresa A. West
- Occupation(s): Film director, domestic worker
- Spouse: Oscar C. West (1935-42)

Tressie Souders (February 7, 1897 – January 17, 1995) was the first known African American female to direct a feature film: 1922's A Woman's Error.

== Early life ==
Theresa Ann Souders was born in Frankfort, Kansas, the only child of Robert Souders and Leuvenia Ann Bryant, African-American natives of Kentucky who emigrated to Kansas, most likely as a result of the mass migration of African-Americans from the South to the American West due to the Exoduster movement. The couple split, and on June 9, 1904, Leuvenia married Chester Arthur Harris, a porter for the Missouri Pacific Railroad, with whom she would have six more children.

Tressie grew up in Frankfort and graduated from Frankfort High School in 1918. After graduation, she journeyed to Kansas City, Missouri where she was employed as a maid in private homes, a job she would perform for most of her working life.

According to the Kansas City city directory for 1921, she was working as a maid at the Mack B. Nelson House at 5500 Ward Parkway in the Sunset Hill neighborhood of the Country Club District in Kansas City, Missouri.

== A Woman's Error ==
It is not yet known how Tressie Souders got into the film-making business, although it is known that she performed in an amateur theatrical production, a morality play entitled "Every Negro" written by the Reverend A. Lawrence Kimbrough of the Holsey Chapel Christian Methodist Episcopal Church of Frankfort in 1918.

Kansas City physician A. Porter Davis produced and starred in The Lure of A Woman which was produced in 1921, while local newspaper editor, author, lecturer, and social activist Maria P. Williams produced, directed and starred in a 1923 melodrama The Flames of Wrath. Both productions were locally made and produced, and enlisted local talent.

In January 1922, the Afro-American Film Exhibitors Company of Kansas City, Missouri, with offices in Baltimore, Maryland and Dallas, Texas, contracted with Souders to distribute her film "A Woman's Error". Billboard Magazine for January 28, 1922 (34:107) published the company's announcement that "'A Woman's Error' was the first of its kind to be produced by a young woman of our race, and has been passed on by the critics as a picture true to Negro life."

To date, no prints have been located.

== Later life ==
Sometime between 1923 and 1926, Tressie Souders moved to Los Angeles, California, possibly intending to get into the motion picture business. However, she appears in surviving public records as a domestic worker. In the 1930 Federal Census, as "Tressa Souders", she is listed as a resident of the Sojourner Truth Industrial Home at 1139 East Adams Avenue. She would stay at that address until 1935, when she married Oscar C. West, a native of Richmond, Virginia who ran a pool hall in the Watts section of Los Angeles. The marriage was short-lived; by 1940, she is in San Francisco, California, living at the Madame C.J. Walker Home for Girls at 2066 Pine Street. Oscar West died in 1942 in Los Angeles. There were no children.

Tressie West appears to have remained in San Francisco for the rest of her life, subject to periodic trips to Los Angeles or back home to Kansas.

== Legacy and honors ==
The Tressie Souders Film Society grew from the International Black Women's Film Festival (IBWFF), founded in 2001 in San Francisco. According to its website, the Society "recognizes, supports and preserves the works of film and video by and/or featuring Blacks in non-stereotypical...roles....The society’s goals are to provide a voice, resources, support, training, and guidance to emerging and established filmmakers who exemplify the society’s mission and the mission of the International Black Women's Film Festival."

In 2008, the IBWFF established the Tressie Souders Awards ("Tressies"), now known as the Black Laurel Awards.

The IBWFF has recently initiated the "Tressie Magazine"; its goal is to provide "insightful articles about your favorite Black actresses, including a refreshingly contemporary look at style, music and the film industry –especially in regards to women of color."
