= Ebony Film Corporation =

Film company in Chicago

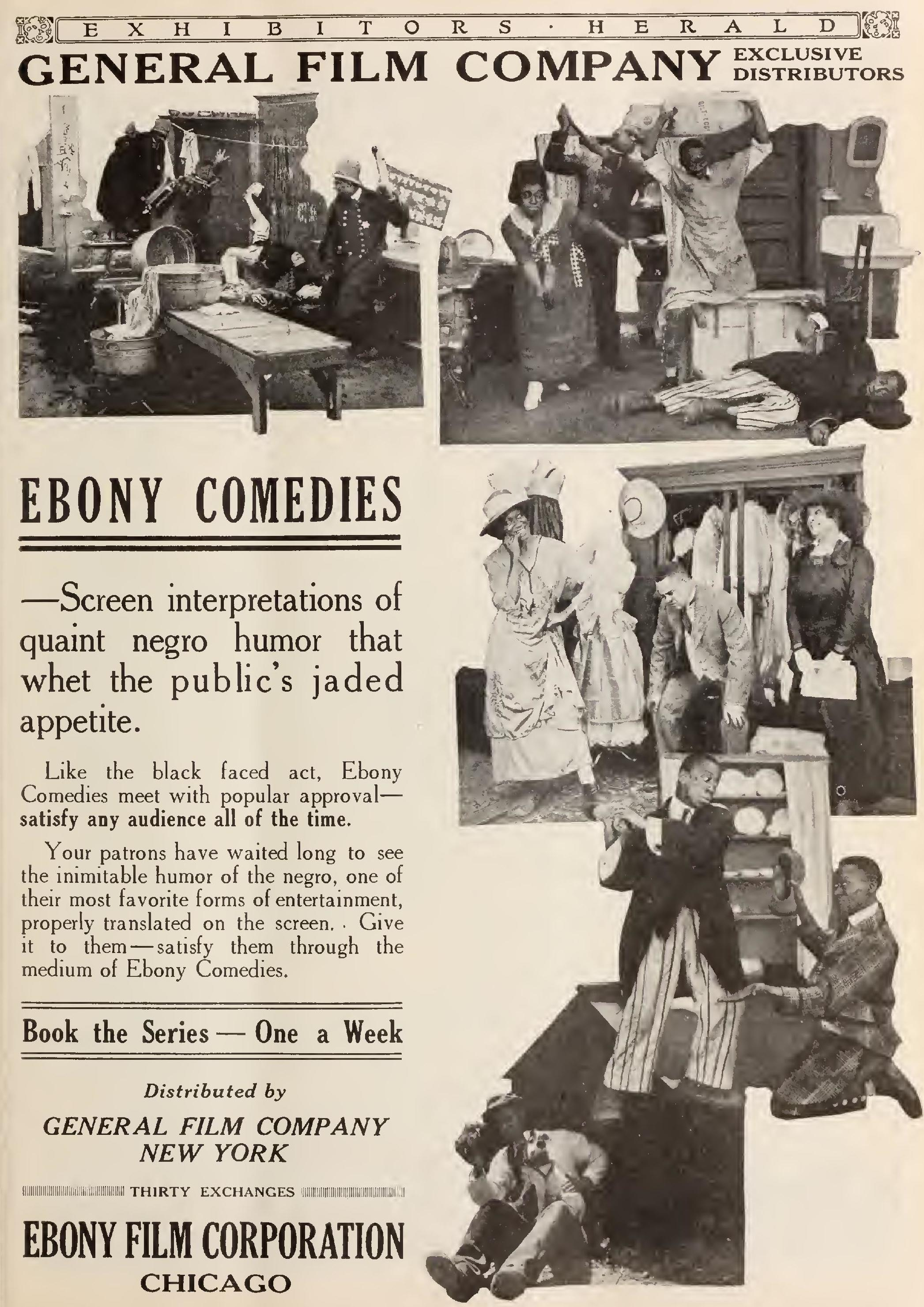
Advertisement in the Exhibitors Herald, June 29, 1918

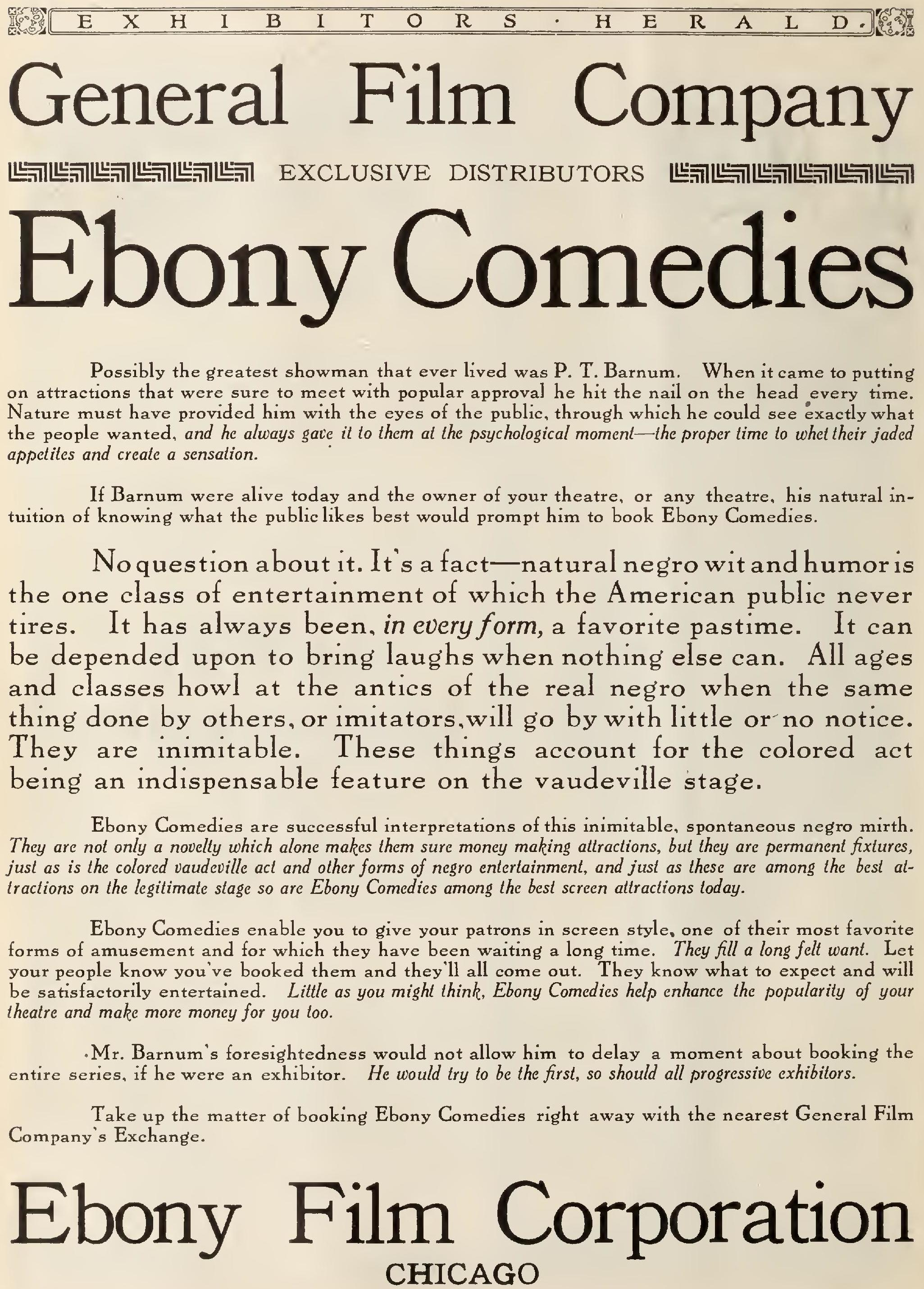

Ebony Film Corporation was an American film company established in Chicago in 1915 as Historical Feature Film Company. Its films were distributed "exclusively" by General Film Company. The company's films and its depictions of African Americans caused outrage and opposition from African Americans. The company used a logo of a monkey in blackface. The business folded in 1919.

The company produced two-reel Westerns, newsreels, and documentaries as well as several short comedy films with African American casts depicting degrading racial stereotypes. A Reckless Rover is a 1918 slapstick comedy film that survives in the Library of Congress' collection. The film credits C. N. David as its director and features a man who does not want to get out of bed pursued by bumbling Keystone Cops style antics. He is put to work in a Chinese laundry and various antics ensue. Sam Robinson starred in several of Ebony's slapstick comedy films. Luther J. Pollard was credited as a producer.

One of the company's advertisements listed its film offerings and teased the coming of a film adaptation of Eldred Kurtz Means' story "Good Luck in Old Clothes" s from the Tickfall Tales series. The film was produced.

== Filmography ==
- The Shooting Star (1915)
- Two Knights of Vaudeville (1915), extant
- Spying the Spy (1915), an extant detective comedy that parodies The Birth of a Nation
- Shine Johnson and the Rabbit's Foot (1917)
- Wrong All Around (1917)
- Dat Blackhand Waitah Man (1917)
- A Reckless Rover (1918), extant
- Mercy, the Mummy Mumbled (1918), extant
- The Bully (1918)
- A Black Sherlock Holmes (1918)
- Black and Tan Mix Up (1918)
- Some Baby (1918)
- A Busted Romance (1918)
- Firing the Fakir (1918)
- When You Hit, Hit Hard (1918)
- Are Working Girls Safe? (1918)
- A Milk Fed Hero (1918)
- Busted Romance (1918)
- Good Luck in Old Clothes (1918) an adaptation of the E. K. Means story that appeared in the mAll Story Weekly
- Spooks (1917)
- The Porters
- The Janitor

== See also ==
- Lincoln Motion Picture Company
- REOL Productions
