= Jamieson Film Company =

Still image of Hugh Jamieson, during interview at KERA, circa 1970s

The Jamieson Film Company, a Texas film production company, was one of the crucial players in the emergence of Dallas as a center for commercial film production in the U.S. Founded by Hugh Jamieson in 1916, the Jamieson Film Company is perhaps most widely remembered for producing the first copies of the Abraham Zapruder film that captured the assassination of JFK. However, the Company’s involvement with the Zapruder film represents just a single episode in over a half-century in the film processing and production business. During its lifespan, the Jamieson Film Company produced industrial films, television programs and advertisements for clients across Texas and the U.S., patented film processing equipment, and became a training ground for many individuals in the Texas film industry.

== History of the Jamieson Film Company ==
=== Early Years: Kansas and itinerant films ===
Hugh Jamieson was born in Kansas in 1889 and attended Baker University in Baldwin, where he studied engineering. Using a $150 loan, Jamieson bought his first motion picture camera, operated using a hand crank. He financed his education by opening a movie theater and upon graduation, got a job at Thomas Edison’s company selling Kinetoscopes in the Missouri area. After a fire at Edison in 1914, Hugh decided to set off to produce his own films.

Before arriving in Dallas, Hugh traveled from town to town making community or itinerant films featuring community landmarks, businesses and, most importantly, local residents—particularly children. From 1914 to 1916, Jamieson filmed several versions of Won from the Flames, processing films in his hotel room and screening them in the local theater. Unfortunately, no copies of the films have been found.

In 1916, Jamieson settled in Dallas and opened his film business at 2212 Live Oak Street. In the business’s early days, Hugh filmed a number of community events and created advertising films that ran in theaters prior to feature screenings. During this time, he also made and patented his first film processing machines and built his own sound equipment.

Jamieson was called upon by major newsreel companies associated with Universal, Pathe, Paramount, and RKO to cover many Dallas events. He produced newsreels documenting the funeral of aviator Wiley Post and the sentencing of George “Machine Gun” Kelly (the first synchronous sound footage filmed in a federal courtroom). Jamieson was also known to have filmed the New London school disaster.

=== 1930s-1940s: Military and instructional films ===
When Hugh joined the federal War Production Advisory Committee for advertising and industrial film producers and distributors in 1942, his company took on a pivotal role in the production of many military films.

Jamieson was also contracted to shoot films for non-military governmental projects. The company worked with the Federal Security Agency and the United States Office of Education to produce a 1944 industrial film called “Hardness Testing,” which trains workers to test the strength of metal airplane parts.

Between 1941 and 1947, African American filmmaker Spencer Williams (also known for his role in TV’s Amos and Andy) worked with the Jamieson Company to process and edit his films for the Dallas-based Sack Amusement Enterprises. Working with Alfred R. Sack, Williams directed nine films in the area, including The Blood of Jesus (1941) and Juke Joint (1947).

In 1947, Jamieson moved the company's headquarters to 3825 Bryan Street, which provided space for sound stages, recording studios, editorial and animation facilities, and color processing labs. His sons, Bruce and Hugh Jr., became increasingly involved in their father’s business and eventually took over leadership of the company in 1953.

=== 1950s-1970s: Commercials, corporate films, and the rise of TV ===
Under the direction of Hugh’s two sons, Jamieson Film Company grew and developed into a studio concept business with cameramen, writers, editors, animators, and a lab. Although government and military contracts continued, the company was also working on numerous corporate films and television productions. With the rise of TV, the company became increasingly involved in the production of commercials and programs for television.

Jamieson provided support for the growing broadcast industry, creating special news coverage for NBC and building a small 16mm motion picture processing machine TV stations could use to process their own news film coverage. In the early 1950s, Jamieson Film Company produced a weekly thirty-minute news magazine television show, Texas in Review, sponsored by the Humble Oil & Refining Company. Bruce Jamieson was in charge of this program, and he wrote, developed, and produced the show, as well as the commercials. Texas in Review ran fifty-two weeks for four years. The archives of this show are held by Texas Tech University. The Jamieson team worked with the advertising agency TracyLocke on the production of numerous television commercials in the 1950s and ’60s.

In the immediate aftermath of the JFK assassination in November 1963, Abraham Zapruder worked with Jamieson to produce prints of the Kodachrome film on which he recorded his now-famous footage of the shooting.

By the late 1960s, Jamieson had an impressive roster of local and national accounts, and had helped to foster several individuals who had opened production businesses in the Dallas area. The Jamieson Film Company was dismantled in 1972 into a film lab and manufacturing division.

== Notable people associated with the Jamieson Film Company ==
The Jamieson Film Company served as a training ground for many figures in the film industry in Dallas and beyond. Former employees include:

- Bill Stokes: Owner of Bill Stokes Associates, later known as The Stokes Group, a Dallas-based production company that made industrial and promotional films for a range of clients, including Mary Kay, the City of Dallas, and the United States Navy.
- Robert Redd: Owner of Producers Services Incorporated and co-owner of TelePrint Inc.
- Gordon Yoder: Founder of Professional Cine Products (later Gordon Yoder, Inc.).
- Spencer Williams: Worked with the Jamieson Company to process and edit his films for the Sack Amusement Company in the 1940s, including The Blood of Jesus (1941) and Juke Joint (1947).
- Bob Jessup: Cinematographer who worked on The Dukes of Hazzard and Dallas and was elected to the American Society of Cinematographers in 1976.
- Joe Camp: Creator of Benji.
