= H. W. Kier =

American film producer

Harley William Kier (April 10, 1891 in Highland County, Ohio – February 4, 1967 in San Antonio, Texas), was an American film producer who produced many low-budget short films and a few feature films almost exclusively in and around San Antonio, Texas.

Kier partnered with A.A. Phillips in 1926 and founded Kier-Phillips productions. They produced short commercial and industrial films. They created National Pictures Gulf Coast Studios in the 1930s and continued making shorts, most of which have not survived.

Kier did little producing in the 1940s but worked on some of the race films made in Texas by Sack Amusement Entertainment. In 1955 and 1956, Kier produced a series of comedy shorts in Spanish called Chepo y Kayote

== Filmography ==
- Border Fence (1951) (also directed)
- The Girl in Room 20 (1946) (also edited)
- Of One Blood (1944)
- Marching On! (1943)
- The Alamo: Shrine of Texas Liberty (1938)
- Clipped Wings (1937)
