= Juke: Passages from the Films of Spencer Willams =

2015 film essay

Juke: Passages from the Films of Spencer Williams is a 2015 documentary film by film essayist Thom Andersen featuring selected excerpts from the films of African American director Spencer Williams Jr.

== Summary ==
The film is a plotless thirty-minute montage reconsidering Spencer's religious melodramas such as The Blood of Jesus (1941) that cuts scenes and aspects of his films while assembling major and minor moments into a portrait reflecting 1940s Black America.

== Production ==
Commissioned by the Museum of Modern Art as part of their program “A Road Three Hundred Years Long: Cinema and the Great Migration”, Thom regraded his movie as

"a kin to Walker Evans' photographs of sharecroppers' homes in the 1930s and George Orwell's essays on English working class interiors".

== See also ==
- Race film
- Juke joint
- Christian film industry
