= Hot Biskits =

1931 short film

Hot Biskits was an independent comedy short film released in 1931. It was written and directed by Spencer Williams and was his first film. Glen Gano was the cinematographer. The 10-minute race film was a made by Dixie Comedies Corp. of Hollywood, California. A 16mm print of the film is preserved at the Library of Congress. The film portrays a miniature golf competition between two rivals. The film was rediscovered in the Library of Congress Archives after 80 years. The film's cast is all African-American. Williams' next film, The Blood of Jesus, was made 10 years later.

Hot Biskits was included in the crowdfunded 2015 Kino Lorber boxset Pioneers of African-American Cinema.

== Cast ==
- Thurston Briggs
- Spencer Williams

== See also ==
- African American cinema
