= Tondaleyo (actress) =

American dancer and singer (1912-1998)

- Born: Wilhemina T. Gray; July 29, 1912; New York, New York, US
- Died: January 9, 1998 (aged 85); New York, New York, US
- Occupations: Dancer, singer, and musician

Tondaleyo (born Wilhemina T. Gray, July 29, 1912 - January 9, 1998) was an American specialty dancer, chorus girl, singer, musician, actress, and nightclub owner. She was known for her dance performances, as well as appearances in a few films during the 1940's.

== Early life ==
Tondaleyo was born Wilhemina T. Gray on July 29, 1912, in New York, New York, US. Her father deserted the family during her childhood, leaving her mother to raise her alone under difficult financial circumstances. She began dancing at the age of six to help support her mother and keep the family together financially. As a child, she won numerous dance contests in New York and consistently requested cash prizes instead of trophies, explaining her preference by saying "the cup would turn green, but five dollars would feed the family for a week." This early experience in dance contests marked the beginning of her lifelong involvement in performance, driven by the need to contribute to her family's support.

== Career ==
Tondaleyo built her professional reputation as a specialty dancer, chorus girl, singer, and musician, with a distinctive exotic and flashy style that often featured elaborate costuming and diamond accents. She also owned her own night club/restaurant/cafe, "Tondaleyo's", located at 18 West 52nd Street in midtown Manhattan in Times Square, which opened in 1944 and was where she worked as a hostess, performing at the club every night.

Tondaleyo was also one of the "Cotton Club" girls at the famous Cotton Club in Harlem, the others being Lena Horne, Ruby Dallas Young, Juanita Boisseau, Hyacinth Curtis, and Cleo Hayes. She was a close friend of Gladys Bentley, another performer at the Cotton Club, who starred in a Broomfield and Greely production in 1937. Tondaleyo starred in a production titled "Savage Rhythm" with Mae West and accompanying Cuban dancers. She stunned patrons with her dance style and her captivating beauty. She was considered one of the most flashiest women of her day, owning numerous diamonds, furs, and minks. She was also credited for being the first black woman to own a nightclub in New York. She also starred alongside Horne in the 1943 musical Stormy Weather with an uncredited performing role. Her only credited film role was in the 1947 race film Sepia Cinderella, where she played Vivian, a secret admirer of Bob, the bandleader.

== Personal life and death ==
Tondaleyo married Wilbert Whitfield in September 1974 and divorced in October 1987. She later married John Howard Levy (no relation to her brother-in-law; with whom she had 1 child), changing her name to Tondaleyo Grey Levy in her later years. She died on January 9, 1998, in New York City, New York at the age of 85.

== Filmography ==
- Stormy Weather (1943) - uncredited performing role
- Sepia Cinderella (1947) - Vivian Marston
