= Boy! What a Girl! =

- DVD box art
- Directed by: Arthur H. Leonard
- Written by: Vincent Valentini
- Produced by: Jack Goldberg; Arthur H. Leonard
- Starring: Tim Moore; The Brown Dots; Slam Stewart; Sid Catlett; Gene Krupa.
- Cinematography: George Webber
- Edited by: Jack Kemp
- Production company: Herald Pictures
- Distributed by: Screen Guild Productions
- Release date: April 7, 1947
- Running time: 70 minutes
- Country: United States
- Language: English

Boy! What a Girl! is a 1947 American race film directed by Arthur H. Leonard and starring Tim Moore, with guest appearances by the Brown Dots, Slam Stewart, Sid Catlett and Gene Krupa.

== Plot ==
Would-be theatrical producer Jim Walton (Elwood Smith) is planning a new show that will feature bandleader Slam Stewart and the comic female impersonator Bumpsie (Tim Moore). Mr. Cummings, the wealthy father of Jim’s girlfriend Cristola, has agreed to finance half of the show if the famous Parisian impresario Madame Deborah will provide the second half of the funding. When word arrives that Madame Deborah’s arrival from France has been delayed, Bumpsie is brought in to keep Mr. Cummings occupied. Mr. Cummings, however, is unaware that Bumpsie is a man in drag and he falls in love with him.

The real Madame Deborah unexpectedly arrives early and passes herself off as Mrs. Martin. Two other would-be suitors, impressed with Madame Deborah’s wealth, begin to pursue Bumpsie.

A fundraising party for the show is held, where several musical acts arrive to perform. A pair of thugs attempt to kidnap Bumpsie, believing he is Madame Deborah, but he manages to escape. The real Madame Deborah identifies herself and agrees to finance Jim’s show, enabling him to achieve his professional goals and to marry Cristola.

== Cast ==
- Tim Moore as Bumpsi
- Elwood Smith as Jim Walton
- Duke Williams as Harry Diggs
- Alan Jackson as Mr. Cummings
- Sheila Guyse as Francine
- Betti Mays as Cristola
- Sybil Lewis (actress) as Mme. Deborah Martin
- Warren Patterson as Donaldson the Landlord
- Milton Woods as the Jealous Lover
- Lorenzo Tucker as the Jealous Lover's Helper

== Production ==
Boy! What a Girl! was planned to be the first in a series of all-black race films produced by the independent company Herald Pictures. The film’s press kit acknowledged the segregated distribution patterns of the race film by proclaiming Boy! What a Girl! would be “an all-Negro motion picture can be produced to play in any theater in the country and not merely confined to the some 600 odd playhouses that cater strictly to an all-Negro audience.”

The film was shot at the Fox Movietone Studio in New York City. Gene Krupa, the only white member of the cast, was not originally signed to appear in the film; director Arthur H. Leonard invited Krupa to be on camera when the famous drummer stopped by to visit cast member Sid Catlett on the set.

Boy! What a Girl! was the only starring film role for Tim Moore, an African American vaudeville comedy star who later became famous as the Kingfish in the television series Amos 'n Andy.

A pre-production news item identified Marva Lewis, the ex-wife of boxing champion Joe Louis, as being a part of the cast, but she is not present in the finished film, as she was forced to withdraw due to illness. She was replaced by the Brown Dots.

== Legacy ==
There has been a revival of interest in the film in recent years due to the prominence of its black cast.

Donald Bogle wrote that the race films of the late 1940s succeeded as "fundamental celebrations of cultural roots and communal spirits and also as pure, undiluted celebrations of black style. Such movies as Broken Strings, Boy! What a Girl! (1946), Sepia Cinderella (1947), The Bronze Buckaroo, and scores of others introduced a new rhythm to American cinema. Vocal inflections and intonations set the ears abuzz. The manners, gestures, postures, surprising double takes, swift interplay and communication between the characters is a world unto itself, capturing, despite whatever other distortions or failings, a segment of black American life and culture."

== See also ==
- List of films in the public domain in the United States
