= The Girl in Room 20 =

- Directed by: Spencer Williams
- Produced by: Alfred N. Sack
- Starring: Geraldine Brock; Spencer Williams; July Jones
- Cinematography: Frank Brodie; Jack Specht
- Edited by: H. W. Kier
- Music by: Roger Cockrell
- Distributed by: Sack Amusement Enterprises
- Release date: 1949 (U.S.)
- Running time: 63 minutes
- Country: United States
- Language: English

The Girl in Room 20 is a 1949 film directed by and starring Spencer Williams. The story features Daisy Mae Walker, an aspiring singer from a small town in Texas, who comes to New York City to pursue a show business career, only to fall prey to a sleazy nightclub owner. Thanks to the intervention of a kindly taxi driver, Daisy Mae is able to achieve her goals. The film is categorized as a race film.

The Girl in Room 20 was filmed in 1946, but did not receive theatrical distribution until 1949.

A 2002 Chicago Tribune article describes the film as provocative.

== Cast ==
- Geraldine Brock
- Spencer Williams
- July Jones

== See also ==
- List of films in the public domain in the United States
