= Brother Martin: Servant of Jesus =

- Poster art
- Directed by: Spencer Williams
- Written by: Spencer Williams
- Starring: Spencer Williams
- Distributed by: Sack Amusement Enterprises
- Release date: 1942 (U.S.)
- Country: United States
- Language: English

Brother Martin: Servant of Jesus (1942) is a race film written and directed by Spencer Williams.

== Production ==
The film was produced in Tulsa, Oklahoma, on the grounds of St. Monica Catholic Church. It featured an all-black cast and was produced exclusively for exhibition in U.S. cinemas serving African American communities. It was among a number of religious-themed feature films created by Williams during the 1940s, who also wrote and directed The Blood of Jesus (1941) and Go Down, Death! (1944).

== Preservation status ==
No archive or private collection is known to have a print of Brother Martin: Servant of Jesus, and it was thought to be a lost film. A trailer was located at UCLA by Ray Langstone in 2022.

== See also ==
- List of lost films
- Christian film industry
