= Beale Street Mama =

- Poster art
- Directed by: Spencer Williams
- Written by: Sam Elljay
- Produced by: Bert Goldberg
- Starring: July Jones; Spencer Williams; Rosalie Larrimore
- Cinematography: H. Arthur Smith
- Music by: Vincent Valentini
- Distributed by: Sack Amusement Enterprises
- Release date: 1946
- Running time: 62 minutes
- Country: United States
- Language: English

Beale Street Mama is a 1923 popular song by J. Russell Robinson and Roy Turk and a 1946 film with an African-American cast named for the song. An early jazz standard, the song was recorded by Bessie Smith, Ted Lewis, Fletcher Henderson, Cab Calloway, and many others.

The 1946 film Beale Street Mama was named after the song. A race film, it was directed by and stars Spencer Williams. It was distributed by Sack Amusement Enterprises.

The film is set in Memphis, Tennessee, and focuses on a street sweeper who comes upon a large parcel of money. He uses the newly acquired wealth to go on a spending spree, with the hope of getting back at an old girlfriend who dumped him for another man. However, complications arise when it is discovered the money is counterfeit.

No copyright was filed for Beale Street Mama, which makes the production a public domain film.

== Cast ==
The cast includes:

- July Jones
- Spencer Williams
- Rosalie Larrimore

== See also ==
- List of films in the public domain in the United States
