= Francine Everett =

American actress (1915–1999)

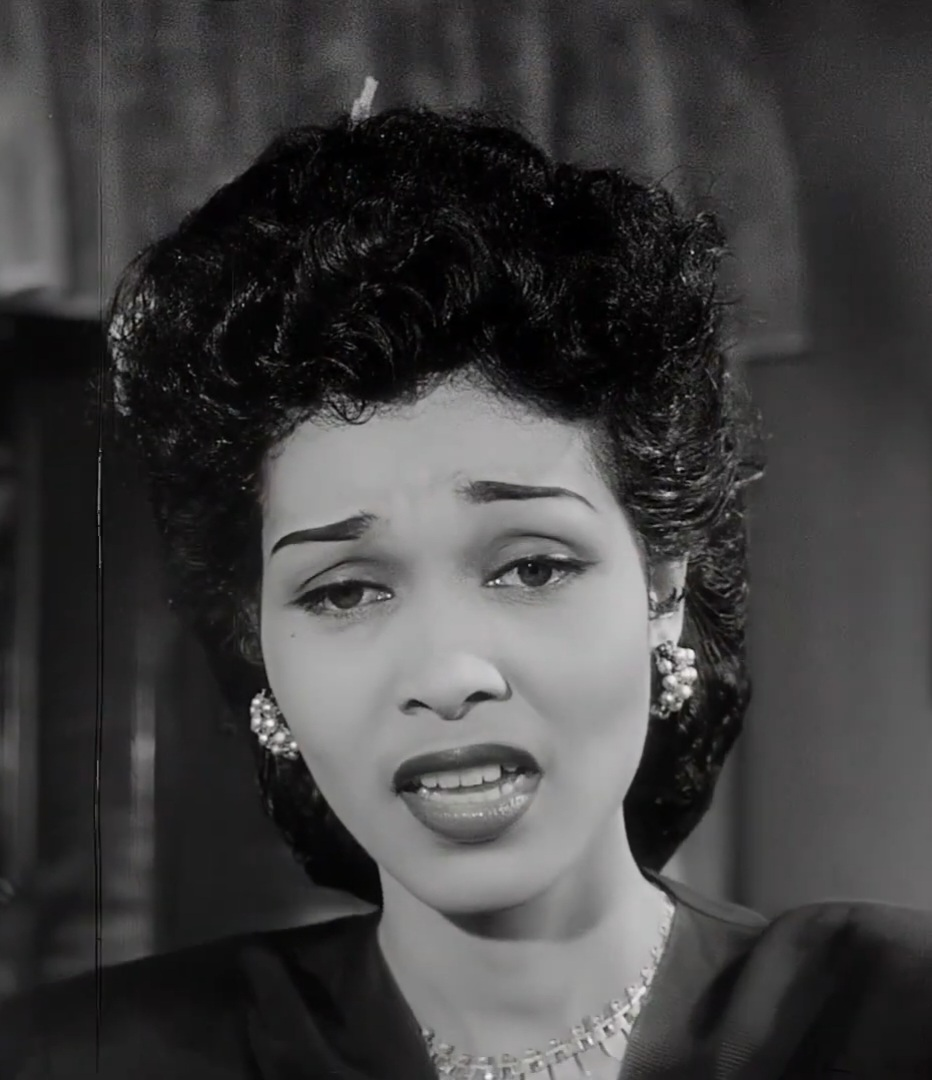
- Everett in Dirty Gertie from Harlem U.S.A. (1946)
- Born: Franciene Williamson; April 15, 1915; Louisburg, North Carolina, U.S.
- Died: May 27, 1999 (aged 84); The Bronx, New York City, U.S.
- Occupation: Actress
- Years active: 1939–1950
- Spouses: Booker Everett (m. 1933, divorced) Rex Ingram (m. 1936; div. 1939)

Francine Everett (born Franciene Williamson; April 13, 1915 – May 27, 1999) was an American actress and singer.

Everett is best known for her performances in race films, independently produced motion pictures with all-black casts that were created exclusively for distribution to cinemas that catered to African-American audiences.

== Early life ==
She was born in Louisburg, North Carolina in 1915, and her father Noah was a tailor. She married Booker Everett in 1933 when she was 18. This marriage was dissolved, and she later married actor Rex Ingram. They divorced three years later in 1939. She studied and acted with the Federal Theater in Harlem, which was sponsored by the Works Progress Administration.

== Career ==
Among Everett's starring roles were the films Paradise in Harlem (1939), Keep Punching (1939) co-starring Canada Lee and Dooley Wilson, Big Timers (1945) co-starring Moms Mabley and Stepin Fetchit, Tall, Tan and Terrific (1946) with Mantan Moreland and Dots Johnson, and Dirty Gertie from Harlem U.S.A. (1946), directed by Spencer Williams.

Everett appeared as a singer in more than 50 short musical films that were produced in the 1940s, notably Ebony Parade (1947), which co-starred Dorothy Dandridge, Cab Calloway and the Count Basie band. She also worked as a model in print advertisements for clothing and cosmetics.

=== Hollywood ===
Everett's association with Hollywood was brief and desultory. She first arrived in Hollywood in the mid-1930s with husband Rex Ingram, but refused to accept racially demeaning stereotypical roles. After starring in Dirty Gertie from Harlem U.S.A., she had bit parts in two Hollywood films: Lost Boundaries (1949) and Sidney Poitier's first film, No Way Out (1950).

At the height of her career, Everett was dubbed "the most beautiful woman in Harlem" by columnist Billy Rowe in The Amsterdam News, a black-owned newspaper in New York City. Looking back at her career, filmmaker William Greaves commented: "She would have been a superstar in Hollywood were it not for the apartheid climate in America and the movie industry at the time."

== Later life ==
=== Retirement ===
After retiring from the entertainment industry, Everett took a clerical job at Harlem Hospital in New York. She retired from her hospital job in 1985, and in her later years she spoke about the race films at seminars sponsored by the International Agency for Minority Artist Affairs.

== Death ==
Everett died at a nursing home in The Bronx, New York, aged 84, on May 27, 1999.
