= Of One Blood =

Of One Blood may refer to:

- Of One Blood (album), an album from Shadows Fall
- Of One Blood (novel), a 1902 speculative fiction novel by Pauline Hopkins
- Of One Blood (film), 1944 film directed by Spencer Williams
- Of One Blood, a 2006 L.A. Theatre Works production by Andrew White
