= Sheila Guyse =

American singer, actress, and recording artist

- Born: Etta Drucille Guyse; July 14, 1925; Forest, Mississippi, U.S.
- Died: December 28, 2013 (aged 88); Honolulu, Hawaii, U.S.
- Other name: Shelia Guyse Jackson
- Occupations: Actress, Singer
- Spouses: Shelby Irving Miller (divorced) Kenneth Davis (divorced); Joseph Jackson (m. 1958; died 2012)
- Children: 3

Sheila Guyse (born Etta Drucille Guyse; July 14, 1925 – December 28, 2013) was an American singer and actress who performed on stage and screen during the 1940s and 1950s.

== Early life ==
Sheila Guyse was born in Forest, Mississippi on July 14, 1925. She moved with her parents in 1945 to Manhattan, New York City, where she worked at a dime store on 125th Street, across from the Apollo Theater.

Guyse first got her start in show business by performing in amateur shows, as was common among African-American performers of the time. She made her nightclub debut in 1945 at Club Zombie in Detroit.

== Race films ==
Guyse had a sultry "girl-next-door" appeal which she showcased in three independent all-Black films (so-called "race films") of the late 1940s: Boy! What a Girl! (1947), Sepia Cinderella (1947, co-starring with Billy Daniels), and Miracle in Harlem (1948) giving impressive performances in all of them. She also appeared in the "Harlem Follies of 1949" and in a 1957 television adaptation of the play The Green Pastures.

== Broadway ==
Guyse was not an experienced or trained actress but she was a natural talent. She made her Broadway debut in the stage production Memphis Bound, which opened in 1945. She was selected to play the female lead opposite Bill "Bojangles" Robinson. The show closed after 36 performances. She also appeared in the Broadway stage productions Lost in the Stars and Finian's Rainbow, which were both long-running. Lost in the Stars won an Outer Circle Critics Award. Guyse contributed to cast recordings for these productions.

== Magazines ==
Sheila Guyse was popular in the 1940s and 1950s, and graced many covers of publications such as Jet, Ebony, and Our World. She also was known to grace the cover of a magazine called Hue.

== Marriages ==
Sheila Guyse was married three times. She married and divorced Shelby Irving Miller, and their union produced one daughter, Sheila Crystal Miller. Guyse's most publicized marriage, however, was to her second husband, Kenneth Davis. The couple was featured in the article "Negro Women with White Husbands" in the February 1952 issue of Jet. Guyse and Davis met on the set of Finian's Rainbow, where Davis was a dancer. They married in Philadelphia, but spent the majority of their marriage in the Bronx, NY. In 1954 Ken Davis and Sheila Guyse announced that they would end their marriage. In 1958 Guyse married Joseph Jackson, a sanitation worker in New York, and they had two children: Deidre Jean Jackson and Michael Jackson. Guyse later became a Jehovah's Witness due to her marriage to Jackson. The couple remained married until his death in 2012.

== Health ==
Shelia Guyse's health played a very important role in her career as a performer and entertainer. She struggled with her health many times throughout her career which caused her to turn down various roles and even take time away from the entertainment industry. In 1953, she was diagnosed with stomach ulcers a day after she had accepted a role in the Broadway stage production Mile High. She later came back to the entertainment industry in 1958 to record her only studio album, This is Sheila. Although she attempted to make a career comeback she struggled to get back into industry. She died of complications due to Alzheimer's disease on December 28, 2013, at the age of 88.
