= Myra Hemmings =

American actress (1895–1968)

Myra Lillian Davis Hemmings
- Born: Myra Lillian Davis; August 30, 1895; Gonzales, Texas, U.S.
- Died: December 8, 1968 (aged 73); San Antonio, Texas, U.S.
- Education: Howard University
- Occupations: Actress and Teacher
- Known for: Founder of Delta Sigma Theta

Myra Lillian Davis Hemmings (August 30, 1895 – December 8, 1968) was an American actress and teacher, and a founder of Delta Sigma Theta sorority.

== Early life ==
Myra Lillian Davis was born in Gonzales, Texas on August 30, 1895. Her parents were Henry and Susan (née Dement) Davis. In 1909, she graduated from Riverside High School in San Antonio, Texas.

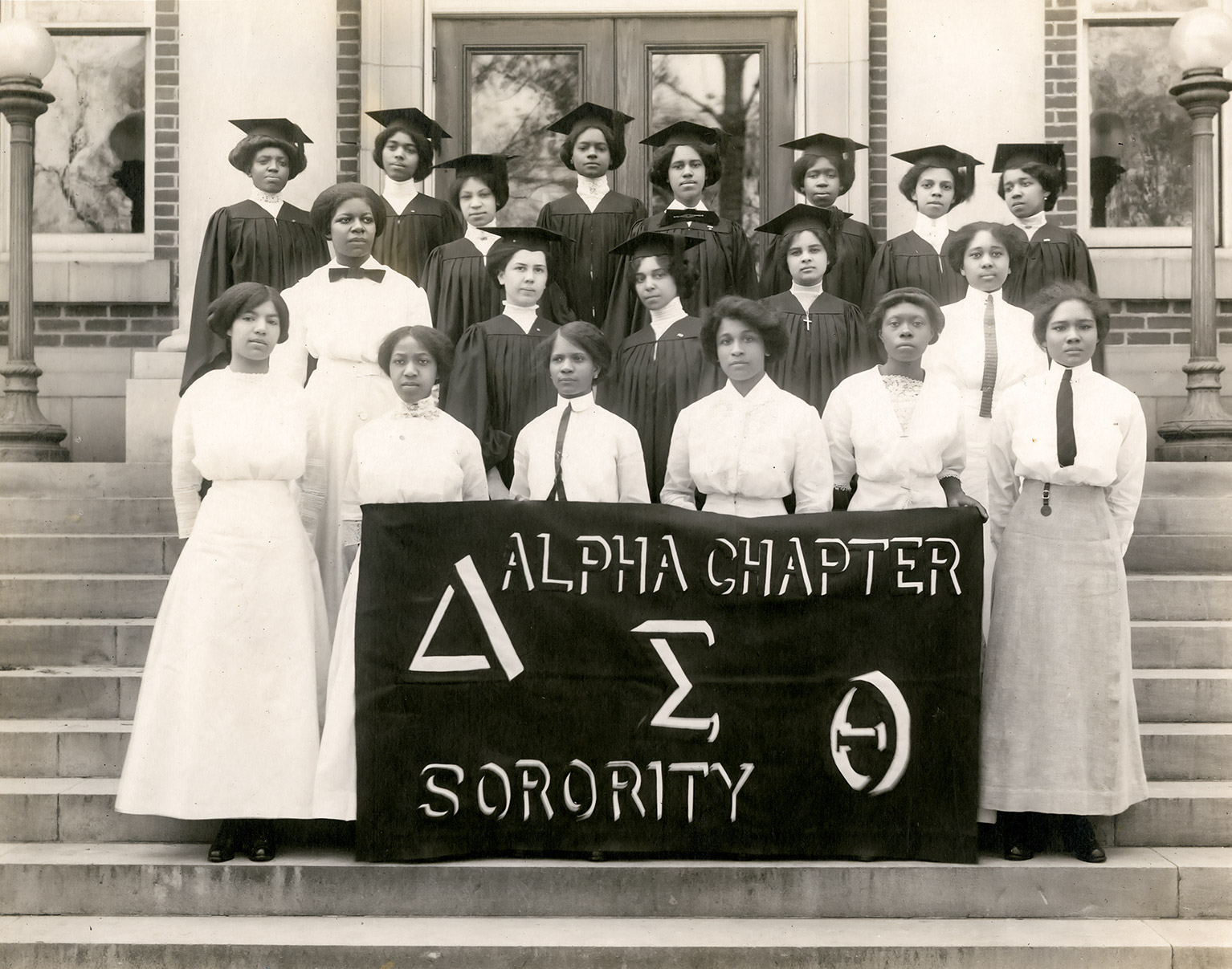
Delta Sigma Theta founders, 1913, at Howard University. Myra Davis Hemmings at the far left, back row.

At Howard University in Washington, D.C., Davis was a part of the group of seven who joined the Alpha chapter of Alpha Kappa Alpha in 1912; she served as its president. A dichotomy ensued between the newly initiated Alpha chapter women who lived on campus and the rest of the organization who lived off campus. The neophytes led by Davis wanted to change the name.and voted to reorganize Alpha Kappa Alpha into Delta Sigma Theta on January 13, 1913. In this meeting she was elected president of Delta Sigma Theta.

In 1913, Hemmings graduated from Howard University. In 1947, Hemmings received her Master of Arts degree in speech from Northwestern University.

== Career ==
After graduation, Davis began teaching in 1913 in San Antonio, Texas. Hemmings was active in amateur theater and participated in the San Antonio Negro Little Theater by directing productions. She and her husband helped to organize Phyllis Wheatley Dramatic Guild Players.

In her career as an actress, she appeared in three films. First, in the 1941 tragic drama film Go Down Death: The Story of Jesus and the Devil, she starred as the martyr Sister Caroline. In addition to acting, Hemmings co-produced and co-directed the film. In the 1943 film Marching On, she played Mrs. Ellen Tucker. In Girl in Room 20 (1946), she played Sarra Walker.

Later as a drama teacher, Hemmings directed plays from the 1920s to the 1950s at the Carver Community Cultural Center in San Antonio. She continued to teach in San Antonio for fifty-one years.

== Personal life ==
In 1922, Davis married John W. Hemmings, a former actor on Broadway.

Hemmings was elected as vice-president of the national Delta Sigma Theta in 1933 as well as the organization's historian in 1948. She was also a member of the NAACP, the National Council of Negro Women and the Alpha Phi Literary Society.

Hemmings died on December 8, 1968, in San Antonio.

== Honors ==
After Hemmings' death, the Dramatic Theatre Guild was renamed Myra Davis Hemmings Memorial Theatre Guild. In addition, the San Antonio alumnae chapter of Delta Sigma Theta sorority resource center was named after Hemmings in 1986. Delta Sigma Theta Sorority, Inc. created the Myra Davis Hemmings Scholarship for the study of performance or creative arts.

== See also ==
- Delta Sigma Theta
