= Elwood Smith =

Elwood Smith may refer to:

- Mike Smith (1920s outfielder) (1904–1981), born Elwood Hope Smith, professional baseball player
- Elwood Smith (actor) (fl. 1945–1961), American theater and film actor
- Elwood Smith, illustrator who worked on books by Peter Mandel and René Colato Laínez
