= The Philadelphia Story =

The Philadelphia Story may refer to:

- The Philadelphia Story (play), a 1939 play by Philip Barry
  - The Philadelphia Story (film), a 1940 film adaptation
  - The Philadelphia Story (1959 film), a TV film adaptation
- "The Philadelphia Story" (The Fresh Prince of Bel-Air), a 1994 TV episode
