= Archibald (musician) =

American musician

Background information
- Born: John Leon Gross; September 14, 1916; New Orleans, Louisiana, United States
- Died: January 8, 1973 (aged 56); New Orleans
- Genres: Rhythm and blues
- Occupation(s): Pianist, singer
- Instrument: Piano
- Years active: 1930s–1973
- Labels: Imperial Records

John Leon Gross (September 14, 1912 or 1916 – January 8, 1973), who performed and recorded as Archibald, was an American rhythm and blues pianist and singer who had a hit in 1950 with "Stack-A-Lee", a version of "Stagger Lee".

== Biography ==
Leon Gross was born in New Orleans, Louisiana, and learned piano as a child. Influenced in particular by local piano player Burnell Santiago, he began playing at parties, and later in brothels, and acquired the nickname "Archie Boy" which eventually became "Archibald". He served in India in the US Army during World War II, before returning to New Orleans to play in bars and clubs.

He signed to Imperial Records, where he recorded thirteen songs between 1950 and 1952. At his first session in March 1950 he recorded "Stack-A-Lee" at Cosimo Matassa's J&M Studio under the direction of bandleader Dave Bartholomew. The song was based on a true story - the shooting of Billy Lyons by "Stag" Lee Shelton in St Louis, Missouri in 1895 - and had already been recorded by many artists including Ma Rainey, Mississippi John Hurt, and Duke Ellington, but Archibald's version was the first to achieve widespread national success. It reached no. 10 on the Billboard R&B chart in the summer of 1950.

He had to cancel a tour that year due to illness, and later recordings failed to match the commercial success of "Stack-A-Lee". However, such records as "Ballin' With Archie" and "Shake Shake Baby" remain highly regarded, and his style influenced other musicians including Fats Domino, Huey "Piano" Smith and Dr. John. They "featured Bartholomew's brash trumpet playing, Joe Harris, and Clarence Hall, respectively, on alto- and tenor-sax, and as solid a rock & roll beat as anything on Imperial...".

Although Archibald never achieved mainstream commercial success, was hampered by illness, and did not record after 1952, he remained a popular entertainer in New Orleans clubs, including a long residency at the Poodle Patio Club. He died of a heart attack in New Orleans in 1973, reportedly after years of alcoholism.

== Discography ==
- The Complete New Orleans Sessions 1950-1952 (Krazy Kat, 1983)

== Filmography ==
- Harlem Hotshots (1945)
