= Juke Joint (film) =

- Directed by: Spencer Williams
- Written by: True T. Thompson
- Produced by: Alfred N. Sack; Bert Goldberg; Inez Newell
- Starring: Spencer Williams; July Jones; Inez Newell
- Cinematography: George Sanderson
- Music by: Red Calhoun
- Distributed by: Sack Amusement Enterprises
- Release date: 1947 (USA)
- Running time: 69 minutes
- Country: United States
- Language: English

Juke Joint is a 1947 race film directed by and starring Spencer Williams and produced and released by Sack Amusement Enterprises. The film was considered lost until being rediscovered.

== Plot ==
Bad News Johnson, a con artist from Memphis, Tennessee, arrives in Dallas, Texas accompanied by his dim sidekick July Jones with only twenty-five cents between them. Johnson is constantly exasperated at Jones’ deficient perspicacity, and at one point he comments that Jones is so dense that he probably thinks "Veronica Lake is some kind of summer resort." The duo arrange to become boarders at the home of Louella "Mama Lou" Holiday, who is fooled into believing that Johnson is an acting teacher named Whitney Vanderbilt; Jones takes the alias of Cornbread Green. Mrs. Holiday agrees to give the men free room and board if they will provide poise lessons to her daughter, an aspiring beauty queen named Honey Dew. The lessons pay off and Honey Dew wins the beauty contest, but problems arise when Mrs. Holiday’s husband, Papa Sam, decides to hold a party for the new beauty queen at a disreputable juke joint.

== Cast ==
- Spencer Williams as Whitney Vanderbilt
- July Jones as "Cornbred" Green
- Inez Newell as "Mama Lou" Holiday
- Leonard Duncan as "Papa Sam" Holiday
- Dauphine Moore as "Honey Dew" Holiday
- Melody Duncan as Melody Holuday
- Katherine Moore as Florida Holiday
- Alford Patterson as Jefferson Lee
- Albert Smith as "High Life" Harris
- Howard Galloway as Juke Joint Johnny
- Clifford Beamon as Bartender
- Frances McHugh as Waitress

== Production ==
Juke Joint was the last in a series of films directed by Spencer Williams, an African American actor and writer, for production by Sack Amusement Enterprises, a white-owned Dallas-based company that distributed all-black race films to segregated theaters across the United States. Williams was among the few African Americans to direct films during the 1940s.

The juke joint scenes were filmed on location at the Rose Room in Dallas and Don’s Keyhole in San Antonio, Texas, and included musical numbers featuring band leader Red Calhoun.

Following the release of Juke Joint, Williams disappeared from the entertainment industry. He returned to prominence in 1951 when he was cast as Andrew H. “Andy” Brown in the television version of the radio comedy Amos 'n Andy, which ran on CBS from 1951 to 1953. He made one final film appearance in a small role in the 1962 Italian horror production L'Orribile Segreto del Dottor Hitchcock.

Juke Joint was considered a lost film for many years, until a print was located in 1983 in a warehouse in Tyler, Texas.

== See also ==
- List of films in the public domain in the United States
