= Go Down, Death! =

1944 race film

Go Down Death
- Theatrical poster art
- Directed by: Spencer Williams
- Written by: Sam Elljay
- Produced by: Alfred N. Sack
- Starring: Spencer Williams; Myra D. Hemmings; Samuel H. James
- Distributed by: Sack Amusement Enterprises
- Release date: 1944
- Running time: 53 minutes
- Language: English

Go Down, Death! (1944) by Spencer Williams

Go Down, Death! is a 1944 race film directed by and starring Spencer Williams. The film's title derives from a poem by the African-American writer James Weldon Johnson.

== Plot ==
Go Down Death takes place in an African-American community where the criminal boss Big Jim Bottoms (Spencer Williams) runs a successful juke joint. The arrival of a new preacher (Samuel H. James) to the town results in many of Big Jim's customers leaving the juke joint in favor of attending church. Big Jim arranges for the preacher to be photographed in staged compromising situations with three attractive women. Aunt Caroline, Big Jim's adoptive mother, becomes aware of the scheme and tries to prevent Big Jim from carrying out his scheme to discredit the preacher. There is a physical struggle between Aunt Caroline and Big Jim, resulting in Aunt Caroline collapsing after being struck. Aunt Caroline dies from her injuries, but Big Jim escapes arrest by claiming an unknown burglar was the culprit. But following Aunt Caroline's funeral, Big Jim's conscience haunts him with visions of eternal damnation in Hell. His body is later discovered in a canyon and the photographs of the preacher are nowhere to be found.

== Production ==
Go Down Death was the third in a trilogy of religious-oriented films directed by Spencer Williams, an African-American filmmaker and actor, for the production and distribution company. He previously directed The Blood of Jesus (1941) and the now-lost Brother Martin: Servant of Jesus (1942). Publicity material for the production listed the film's original title as Go Down, Death! The Story of Jesus and the Devil.

To depict the horrors of Hell, Williams used clips from the Italian silent film L'Inferno (1911), which had been an international success.

In the course of its distribution, Go Down Death ran into several censorship problems. The state censors for Maryland, New York, and Ohio demanded that edits to the Hell sequence involving a brief exposure of a woman's bare breast in a scene from L'Inferno, and the action of a woman pulling up her dress. Ohio censors also requested removal of an image from the Hell sequence where a devil is seen chewing a man.

== See also ==
- Film censorship in the United States
- List of films in the public domain in the United States
- Nudity in film
