= The Fugitive Kind =

1960 film by Sidney Lumet

- Original poster
- Directed by: Sidney Lumet
- Screenplay by: Meade Roberts; Tennessee Williams
- Based on: Orpheus Descending; 1957 play by Tennessee Williams
- Produced by: Martin Jurow; Richard Shepherd
- Starring: Marlon Brando; Anna Magnani; Joanne Woodward; Maureen Stapleton; Victor Jory
- Cinematography: Boris Kaufman
- Edited by: Carl Lerner
- Music by: Kenyon Hopkins
- Distributed by: United Artists
- Release date: April 14, 1960 (New York City)
- Running time: 119 minutes
- Country: United States
- Language: English
- Budget: $2.3 million
- Box office: $2.1 million (US/ Canada)

The Fugitive Kind is a 1960 American drama film starring Marlon Brando, Anna Magnani, and Joanne Woodward, directed by Sidney Lumet. The screenplay by Meade Roberts and Tennessee Williams was based on the latter's 1957 play Orpheus Descending, itself a revision of his 1940 work Battle of Angels, which closed after its Boston tryout. Frank Thompson designed the costumes for the film.

Despite being set in the Deep South, the United Artists release was filmed in Milton, New York. At the 1960 San Sebastián International Film Festival, it won the Silver Seashell for Sidney Lumet and the Zulueta Prize for Best Actress for Joanne Woodward.

The film is available on videotape and DVD. A two-disc DVD edition by The Criterion Collection was released in April 2010. It was upgraded to Blu-Ray in January 2020 and includes three one-act plays by Williams (among them This Property Is Condemned, also later adapted for the screen) performed on NBC television network also directed by Lumet.

== Plot ==
Valentine "Snakeskin" Xavier is a guitar-playing drifter who earns his nickname from his jacket. He flees New Orleans after landing in jail following a police raid on the establishment he was playing at on New Years Eve, to a small town to avoid imprisonment. On his 30th birthday he decides to change his drifting "party boy" life.

Thanks to kind wife (Vee Talbot) of the local sheriff (Jordan Talbot) he finds work in a small-town mercantile store operated by an embittered older woman known as Lady Torrance, whose vicious husband Jabe lies ill in their apartment above the store. An undercurrent of violence, past and present, dominates the town. Lady's father died a tragic death in the burning of his vineyard, after selling wine to local Black citizens (against the law in pre-Civil Rights South).

Frequently drunk libertine outcast Carol Cutrere, who knows Valentine from their shared past in New Orleans, sets her sights on the newcomer. Snakeskin is only attracted to Lady, who has grand plans to open a beautifully decorated "Lady's Confectionery" wing to the rundown store. Sheriff Talbot, a friend of Jabe Torrance, as well as Vee's husband, threatens to kill Snakeskin if he remains in town but Xavier chooses to stay when he discovers Lady is pregnant.

It causes Jabe's final acts of resentment, leading to tragic consequences. While Lady and Snakeskin are in the new Confectionary, an arson fire breaks out. Lady runs to the aid of her husband, trapped in their apartment on the upper floor but Jabe shoots her on the staircase. The fire crew arrive and use the hoses on Snakeskin forcing him back into the flames. The movie ends with Cutrere driving her dilapidated Jaguar roadster out of town.

== Cast ==
- Marlon Brando as Valentine "Snakeskin" Xavier
- Anna Magnani as Lady Torrance
- Joanne Woodward as Carol Cutrere
- Maureen Stapleton as Vee Talbot
- Victor Jory as Jabe Torrance
- R. G. Armstrong as Sheriff Jordan Talbot
- John Baragrey as David Cutrere
- Virgilia Chew as Nurse Porter
- Ben Yaffee as "Dog" Hamma
- Joe Brown Jr. as "Pee Wee" Binnings
- Mary Perry
- Spivy as Ruby Lightfoot
- Sally Gracie as Dolly Hamma
- Lucille Benson as Beulah Binnings
- Emory Richardson as Uncle Pleasant, the Conjure Man
- Nell Harrison
- Frank Borgman as Gas Station Attendant
- Janice Mars as Attendant's Wife
- Debbie Lynch as Lonely Girl
- Jeanne Barr
- Herb Vigran as Caliope Player

== Production ==
Anna Magnani and Marlon Brando had both originally been offered the parts in the Broadway production of Orpheus Descending but turned it down. The roles were played on Broadway by Maureen Stapleton and Cliff Robertson. Film rights to the play were originally optioned by Hal Wallis, who had made a movie of The Rose Tattoo with Anna Magnani (that role had also been originally written for Magnani but played by Stapleton on Broadway). After reception to Orpheus on Broadway proved disappointing, Wallis allowed his option to lapse.

The film was set up by a new team of producers, Martin Jurow and Richard Shepherd, both former agents. They arranged to option the movie rights from Tennessee Williams by obtaining the interest of Anna Magnani and Tony Franciosa as possible stars (both had just made Wild Is the Wind together). United Artists agreed to finance. Marlon Brando became interested in the project and he was given Franciosa's role and the latter actor was paid out.

Variety later reported that the budget of The Fugutive Kind was $2.3 million, of which $1 million went to "talent", with Brando and Anna Magnani on percentages; Joanne Woodward was borrowed from 20th Century Fox. The $1 million fee went to Brando, with Magnani and Sidney Lumet being paid $125,000 each.

Brando wrote in his memoirs he rejected the role on Broadway because he did not wish to return to the stage. He was willing to appear in the film because "I was divorcing my first wife and needed money". Brando felt Magnani was "a troubled woman" who was "miscast". He added, "I’ve always thought of Tennessee as one of the greatest American writers, but I didn’t think much of this play or the movie. Like most great American writers, he turned black people into windowpanes".

Filming began in June 1959 and took place on location in the hamlet of Milton, New York, in Ulster County, and at Bronx Studios in New York City. According to Brando, Magnani tried to seduce him before making the movie but he rejected her.

Lumet thought Magnani "hated acting in English. Of course, Tennessee had written it for her, and she was a great friend of his. But what happens is that when you get down to an emotion, you revert. Under certain emotional conditions, the accent would become stronger and stronger and stronger, until she was finally incomprehensible. So after the shooting she had to come back and loop about 50 percent of her line".

Filming was difficult in partly due to the breakdown of the relationship between Brando and Magnani. Also during the shoot Brando constantly flew back to Los Angeles to oversee the editing of One Eyed Jacks. Lumet later said he enjoyed working with Brando and Woodward but struggled with Magnani "who was going through a personal crisis and hated being in America and in a film studio. This actress, so honest, authentic, sincere, had reached an age where her sole preoccupation was her appearance.... It was as though all the hardships in her life had taken away all her tenderness, and when she gets mad in the film, she is brilliant! The rest of the time she rings false, looks spiritless."

According to Sidney Lumet, the theme of the film was "the struggle to preserve what is sensitive and vulnerable both in ourselves and in the world."

== Critical reception ==
In his review in The New York Times, Bosley Crowther described the film as a

piercing account of loneliness and disappointment in a crass and tyrannical world...[Sidney Lumet's] plainly perceptive understanding of the deep-running skills of the two stars, his daring with faces in close-up and his out-right audacity in pacing his film at a morbid tempo that lets time drag and passions slowly shape are responsible for much of the insistence and the mesmeric quality that emerge ...Mr. Brando and Miss Magnani...being fine and intelligent performers...play upon deep emotional chords...Miss Woodward is perhaps a bit too florid for full credibility...But Miss Stapleton's housewife is touching and Victor Jory is simply superb as the inhuman, sadistic husband...An excellent musical score by Kenyon Hopkins, laced with crystalline sounds and guitar strains, enhances the mood of sadness in this sensitive film.

In the Chicago Reader, Jonathan Rosenbaum wrote "Unfortunately, director Sidney Lumet, who's often out of his element when he leaves New York, seems positively baffled by the gothic south and doesn't know quite what to do with the overlay of Greek myth either."

The Time Out London Film Guide wrote "despite its stellar credentials, just about everything is wrong with this adaptation of Tennessee Williams' play Orpheus Descending...Lumet's direction is either ponderous or pretentious, and he failed to crack the problem of the florid stage dialogue and a dangerously weak role for Brando", and Channel 4 describes it as "a less than satisfying experience...disappointing stuff."

Sidney Lumet later reflected "The problems were many because thematically we wanted the piece to be about the boy, and it was built for that. Yet in the actual text it was all the woman’s. That we never resolved; it was largely my fault. I was a little awed and cowed by him and also I knew that as a play this was his favorite."

== Box Office ==
Brando's biographer claims it was the first Brando film to lose money. Filmink speculated this was due in part to a lack of sexual chemistry in the film.

== In popular culture ==
Some dialogue from a scene in the film was used by Australian hip hop trio Bliss n Eso in their song "Never Land", off their album Running on Air.

Sailor Ripley (Nicolas Cage) wears a snakeskin jacket exactly like Val's in the film Wild at Heart. Singer Scott Walker covered the song Blanket Roll Blues, which Val sings in the movie, on his 1984 album Climate of Hunter.

== See also ==
- List of American films of 1960

== Notes ==
- Manso, Peter (1995). Brando: The Biography.
- Rapf, Joanna E. (2006). Sidney Lumet: Interviews.
