= Harlem Hotshots =

1940 American short film

Harlem Hotshots is an American short film from 1940 produced by Sack Amusements. The 20 minute film is a musical. One poster for the film includes a skyline of buildings and street sign for Lenox Avenue and 125th Street. The film was reissued in 1986 as part of Jazz Classics, No. 110; Harlem Harmonies Volume 1, 1940–1945.

== Performances ==
The film includes Leon Gross and his Orchestra playing "The Swingeroo Stomp", " Dear Old Southland", and "I Found a New Baby", as well as Cora Harris singing "Heaven Help That Heart of Mine". "Dance of the Bellhops" is performed by Stringbean Jackson and the Red Lily Chorus.

== Cast ==
- Cora Harris and her orchestra
- Lena Horne
- Stingbean Jackson
- Leon Gross (also known as Archibald) and his orchestra
- The Red Lilly Chorus
- Teddy Wilson and his orchestra

== Later influences ==
A 1953 film of the same name compiles the work of rhythm & blues and jazz musicians including Lionel Hampton, Dizzy Gillespie, Ruth Brown, Big Joe Turner, and Bill Bailey. It runs 50 minutes.

Harlem Hotshots was also the name of a jazz group fronted by Freddie Webster.

== See also ==
- Dirty Gertie from Harlem, U.S.A.
