= Zapruder film =

Film of the John F. Kennedy assassination

Frame 150 from the Zapruder film. Kennedy's limousine has just turned onto Elm Street.

The Zapruder film is a silent 8mm color motion picture sequence shot by Abraham Zapruder with a Bell & Howell home-movie camera, as U.S. president John F. Kennedy's motorcade passed through Dealey Plaza in Dallas, Texas, on November 22, 1963. It unexpectedly captured the president's assassination.

Although it is not the only film of the shooting, the Zapruder film has been described as the most complete, offering a relatively clear view from a somewhat elevated position on the side from which the president's fatal head wound is visible. Given the camera's 18.3 frames-per-second speed, the film served as a "clock" to construct a detailed timeline of the shots fired. Zapruder's home movie became an essential piece of evidence in the Warren Commission hearings, and in all subsequent investigations of the assassination. It is one of the most studied pieces of film in history, particularly footage of the final shot which helped spawn theories of whether Lee Harvey Oswald was the lone assassin.

In 1994, the film was selected for preservation in the U.S. National Film Registry by the Library of Congress as being "culturally, historically, or aesthetically significant", and was the first amateur film to be selected.

== Creation ==
Abraham Zapruder stood on a concrete pedestal along Elm Street in Dealey Plaza holding a Model 414 PD Bell & Howell Zoomatic Director Series Camera. He filmed from the time the presidential limousine turned onto Elm Street for a total of 26.6 seconds, exposing 486 frames of standard 8 mm Kodachrome II safety film, running at an average of 18.3 frames/second. (Note: The Model 414 PD held a reel of 16 mm film which was first run in one direction, with half of the width of the film being exposed. The reel would then be removed from the camera (a process which could take place in subdued light), the feed and take-up reels swapped and reloaded so that the other half of the film could be exposed in a process analogous to half-track audio tape. The FBI later tested Zapruder's camera and found that it filmed an average of 18.3 frames/second (slightly deviating from the camera's standard frame rate of 16 frame/s). While earlier 8 mm cameras had used a 16 frame/s rate, the 8 mm standard was moving to 18 frame/s by the 1960s, and that was the frame rate adopted by the Super 8 format in 1966.)

Frame 371 showing Jacqueline Kennedy reaching for pieces of Kennedy's skull across the back of the presidential limousine as Secret Service agent Clint Hill climbs aboard.

After Secret Service agent Forrest Sorrels promised Zapruder that the film would be used only for an official investigation, the two men sought to develop the footage as soon as possible. As television station WFAA's equipment was incompatible with the format, Eastman Kodak's Dallas film processing facility developed the film and Jamieson Film Company produced three copies. Zapruder gave two of the copies to Sorrels and they were sent to Washington. The original film was retained by Zapruder, in addition to one of the copies.

On the morning of November 23, 1963, CBS lost the bidding for the film to Richard Stolley of Life magazine. Zapruder sold the print media rights to Life for $50,000, with the stipulation that he could not sell the motion picture rights until after November 29 when Life planned to publish selected frames from the film. But then within days the deal changed. Life publisher C. D. Jackson was involved in the renegotiated agreement in which Life paid Zapruder $150,000 ($1.58 million today) and acquired all rights—motion picture as well as print. Jackson insisted that the disturbing film should be withheld from public viewing until an appropriate later time.

CBS News correspondent Dan Rather was the first to report on national TV about the contents of the Zapruder film after he was given an opportunity to watch it. The inaccuracies in his description contributed to many conspiracy theories about the assassination. In his 2001 book Tell Me a Story, CBS producer Don Hewitt said that he told Rather to go to Zapruder's home, "sock him in the jaw", take the film, copy it, then return it and let the network's lawyers deal with the consequences. According to Hewitt, he realized his mistake after ending their telephone conversation and immediately called Rather back to countermand the order, disappointing the reporter. In a 2015 interview on Opie with Jim Norton, Rather stated that the story was a myth.

Frame 313 of the film captures the fatal shot to the president's head. After claiming to have a nightmare in which he saw a sign in Times Square, New York City, with the phrase "See the President's head explode!", Zapruder insisted that frame 313 be excluded from publication. The November 29, 1963 issue of Life published about 30 frames of the Zapruder film in black and white. Frames were also published in color in the December 6, 1963 special "John F. Kennedy Memorial Edition", and in issues dated October 2, 1964 (a special article on the film and the Warren Commission report), November 25, 1966, and November 24, 1967.

Zapruder was one of at least 32 people in Dealey Plaza known to have made film or still photographs at or around the time of the shooting.

== Subsequent history ==
The Zapruder film frames that were used by the Warren Commission were published in black and white as Commission Exhibit 885 in Volume 18 of the Hearings and Exhibits. Copies of the complete film are available on the Internet. One of the first-generation Secret Service copies was loaned to the Federal Bureau of Investigation (FBI) in Washington, D.C., which made a second-generation copy. After studies of that copy were done in January 1964, the Warren Commission judged the quality to be inadequate, and requested the original film. Life brought the original to Washington in February for the commission's viewing, and made color 35mm slide enlargements from the relevant frames of the original for the FBI. From those slides, the FBI created a series of black-and-white prints, which were given to the commission for its use.

In November 1964, the U.S. Government Printing Office released 26 volumes of testimony and evidence compiled by the Warren Commission. Volume 18 reproduced 158 frames from the Zapruder film in black and white. Frames 208–211 were missing, a splice was visible in frames 207 and 212, frames 314 and 315 were switched around, and frame 284 was a repeat of 283.

The switching of frames 314 and 315 confused the movement of JFK's head in reaction to the fatal shot. Assassination researchers Ray Marcus and David Lifton were the first to notice the transposed labeling of those two frames in Volume 18. In December 1965, Lifton asked his girlfriend at the time, Judith Schmidt, to send a letter he had drafted to the FBI's photo expert, Lyndal Shaneyfelt, pointing out the discrepancy. She and Lifton were surprised when a few weeks later she received a signed letter from FBI Director J. Edgar Hoover stating that frames 314 and 315 had been swapped due to a "printing error", and that the error did not exist in the original Warren Commission exhibits.

In early 1967, Life released a statement saying that four frames of the original (frames 208–211) were accidentally destroyed, and the adjacent frames damaged, by a Life photo lab technician on November 23, 1963. Life released those missing frames from the first-generation copy it had received from the film's original version. The Zapruder frames outside the section used in the commission's exhibits, frames 155–157 and 341, were also damaged and were spliced out of the original rendition of the film, but are present in the first-generation copies.

In 1966, assassination researcher Josiah Thompson, while working for Life, was brought in to examine a first-generation copy of the film and a set of color 35mm slides made from the original. He tried negotiating with Life for the rights to print selected frames in his upcoming book Six Seconds in Dallas. Life refused to approve the use of any frames, even after Thompson offered to give all book sale profits to the magazine. When the book was published in 1967, it included detailed charcoal drawings of important individual frames, plus photo reproductions of the four missing ones. Time Inc., parent of Life, filed a lawsuit against Thompson and his publishing company for copyright infringement. The following year, a U.S. District Court ruled that, in accordance with the doctrine of fair use, the Time Inc. copyright of the Zapruder film had not been violated. The court held that "there is a public interest in having the fullest information available on the murder of President Kennedy," adding that Thompson "did serious work on the subject and has a theory entitled to public consideration" and that "the copying by defendants was fair and reasonable."

In 1967, Life hired New Jersey film lab Manhattan Effects to make a 16 mm film copy of the Zapruder film's original version. Pleased with the results, they asked for a 35 mm internegative to be made. Moses "Moe" Weitzman made several internegatives in 1968, giving the best to Life and retaining the test copies. Weitzman set up his own optical house and motion-picture postproduction facility later that year. Hired in 1969, employee and assassination researcher Robert Groden used one of Weitzman's copies and an optical printer to make versions of the Zapruder film with close-ups and minimize the shakiness of Zapruder's camera.

On June 28, 1967, near the end of the four-part TV series, A CBS News Inquiry: The Warren Report, CBS News anchor Walter Cronkite criticized Time, Inc. for still sequestering the Zapruder film:

There is one further piece of evidence which we feel must now be made available to the entire public: Abraham's Zapruder's film of the actual assassination. The original is now the private property of Life magazine. A Life executive refused CBS News permission to show you that film at any price, on the ground that it is, quote, "an invaluable asset of Time, Inc." unquote. And that, even though these broadcasts have demonstrated that the film may contain vital undiscovered clues to the assassination. Life's decision means you cannot see the Zapruder film in its proper form, as motion picture film. We believe that the Zapruder film is an invaluable asset, not of Time, Inc., but of the people of the United States.

Before the 1969 trial of Clay Shaw, a New Orleans businessman charged with conspiring to assassinate JFK, the New Orleans District Attorney Jim Garrison subpoenaed a copy of the film from Time Inc. Garrison had unsuccessfully subpoenaed the original film in 1968. He was only able to obtain a relatively low-quality copy made several generations from the original. The courtroom showings of Garrison's copy in 1969 were the first time Zapruder's film was shown in public as a motion picture, and not as a set of printed frames. The jurors in the Clay Shaw trial were said to have been "spellbound" by the Zapruder film, which Garrison screened six times. He drew the jurors' attention to the section after frame 313 where the fatal head shot seems to knock Kennedy backward and to his left, suggesting there was a second shooter positioned in front and to the right, and proving, in Garrison's argument, the charge of conspiracy. Garrison allowed the subpoenaed copy to be duplicated, and these low-quality copies began circulating among assassination researchers and journalists.

Zapruder's film was aired as part of a local Los Angeles area TV newscast on February 14, 1969. The film was also broadcast on the late-night TV show Underground News, hosted by Chuck Collins on WSNS-TV, Ch 44, in Chicago in 1970. The film was given to director Howie Samuelsohn by Penn Jones and later aired in syndication in Philadelphia, Detroit, Kansas City, and St. Louis.

On March 6, 1975, Geraldo Rivera invited Robert Groden and Dick Gregory on the ABC TV show Good Night America to present the first-ever U.S. network television broadcast of the Zapruder film. The public's response and outrage to that showing led to the forming of the Hart-Schweiker investigation in the U.S. Senate. That in turn contributed to the Church Committee probe of U.S. intelligence agency abuses, and ultimately resulted in the House Select Committee on Assassinations in the late 1970s.

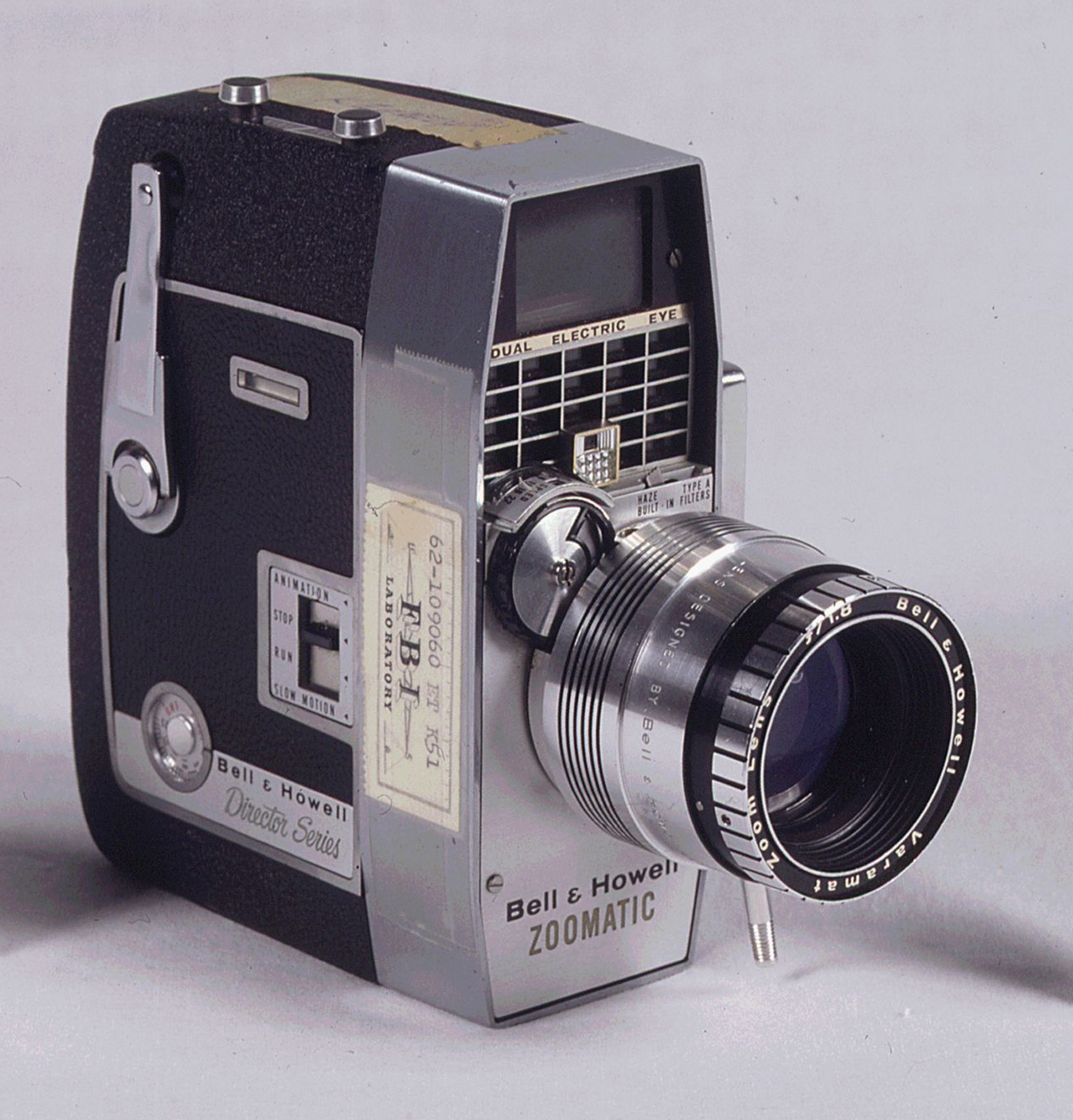
Zapruder's Bell & Howell Zoomatic movie camera used to shoot the film, in the collection of the U.S. National Archives

In April 1975, in settlement of a royalties suit between Time Inc. and Zapruder's heirs that arose from the ABC showing, Time Inc. sold the film's initial rendition and its copyright back to the Zapruder family for the token sum of $1. Time Inc. wanted to donate the film to the U.S. government. The Zapruder family originally refused to consent. In 1978, the family transferred the film to the National Archives and Records Administration for appropriate preservation and safe-keeping, while still retaining ownership of the film and its copyright. Director Oliver Stone reportedly paid $40,000 to the Zapruder family for use of the film in his motion picture JFK (1991).

On October 26, 1992, then-U.S. President George H. W. Bush signed into law the President John F. Kennedy Assassination Records Collection Act (the "JFK Act"), which sought to preserve for historical and governmental purposes all records related to President Kennedy's assassination. The Act created the President John F. Kennedy Assassination Records Collection at the National Archives. The physical Zapruder film was automatically designated an "assassination record" and therefore became the official property of the U.S. government. The copyright in the film remained with Zapruder.

On April 24, 1997, the Assassination Records Review Board (ARRB), which the JFK Act created, announced a "Statement of Policy and Intent with Regard to the Zapruder Film". The ARRB re-affirmed that the Zapruder film was an "assassination record" within the JFK Act's meaning and directed it to be transferred on August 1, 1998, from its present-day location in NARA's film collection to the John F. Kennedy Assassination Records Collection maintained by NARA. (Note: The film's physical location remained the same, only its record classification changed.) As required by the US federal law for such a seizure under eminent domain, payment to Zapruder's heirs was attempted. Because the film is unique, its value was difficult to ascertain. Eventually, following arbitration with the Zapruder heirs, the government provided compensation $16 million in 1999 for the film.

In December 1999, the Zapruder family donated the film's copyright to the Sixth Floor Museum, in the Texas School Book Depository building at Dealey Plaza, along with one of the first-generation copies made on November 22, 1963, and other copies of the film and frame enlargements once held by Life magazine, which had since been returned.

The film's relevant history is covered in a 2003 book, The Zapruder Film: Reframing JFK's Assassination, by history professor David R. Wrone, who tracks the chain of custody for the film.

== Study of the film ==
Every frame of the Zapruder film has been put together into a panoramic movie. Each object that appears during the film has its starting position equal to where it appears first in its frames. The objects' positions are updated during visibility in the Zapruder frames, and they stay motionless once each object moves out of those frames.

The Orville Nix film had the same technology applied to it. The Nix and Zapruder films were then combined into a direct simultaneous comparison movie.

Between November 1963 and January 1964, the FBI examined a copy of the Zapruder film, noting that the camera recorded at an average of 18.3 frames per second. It is not clear from the film itself as to when the first and second shots occurred. It is apparent that by frame 225 the president is reacting to his throat wound. However, no wound or blood is seen on either President Kennedy or Governor Connally prior to frame 313.

== Dispute over authenticity ==
JFK assassination conspiracy theorists have long questioned whether the film known to the public as the Zapruder film is identical to what Abraham Zapruder recorded in his camera, or whether the film was subsequently altered. For example, critics point to the fact that the Zapruder film seems to show the presidential limousine moving at a steady rate throughout, whereas numerous eyewitnesses testified that the limousine briefly came to a stop or near-stop during the shooting.

In October 1965, JFK assassination researcher David Lifton went to the UCLA Law School office of Professor Wesley Liebeler, the former Warren Commission staff attorney who had taken Zapruder's testimony. Lifton referred Liebeler to a page in the Warren Commission Hearings and Exhibits, Volume 18, where an apparent splice could be seen in a printed Zapruder frame:

The splice was clearly visible in frame 212. A thick black horizontal line ran across the center of the frame where the film had been cut, frames removed, and the two ends spliced together. Liebeler practically did a double take.

Liebeler initially made a wry comment that the splice was a "very unlawyerlike" way of handling evidence. He then wrote a letter to Warren Commission General Counsel J. Lee Rankin, asking if there was "a ready explanation for the omission of the frames", and if the matter should be formally raised with the FBI for follow-up. Liebeler received two replies, one from Rankin's assistant Norman Redlich suggesting that "the frames you have in mind were deleted...because...they were of little value because during those frames the Presidential limousine was almost completely hidden by the (Stemmons Freeway) sign", and one from Rankin saying that Redlich's reply disposed of the matter. In January 1967, Life magazine issued a statement that the splice was a result of a photo lab technician accidentally damaging the footage near frame 212, which had to be repaired with a splice. In early 1969, assassination researcher Josiah Thompson discovered a second splice, near frame 155.

In addition to concerns about possible alterations, the claim that the Zapruder film covers the entire shooting from beginning to end has been called into question. Max Holland, author of The Kennedy Assassination Tapes, and professional photographer Johann Rush, wrote a joint editorial piece, published by The New York Times on November 22, 2007. It noted that Zapruder paused filming at around frame 132, when only police motorcycles were visible. When Zapruder resumed filming, frame 133 already shows the presidential motorcade in view. Holland and Rush suggest that the pause could have great significance for interpreting the assassination.

One of the controversies with the Warren Report is its difficulty in satisfactorily accounting for the sequencing of the assassination, in particular, what happened to the one shot that missed, and how Lee Harvey Oswald came to miss at what was assumed to be close range. Holland and Rush argue that the break in the Zapruder film might conceal a first shot earlier than analysts have hitherto assumed. In that scenario, a horizontal traffic mast would temporarily have obstructed Oswald's line of sight. In the authors' words, "The film, we realize, does not depict an assassination about to commence. It shows one that had already started." The evidence offered by Holland and Rush to support their theory was challenged in a series of 2007–08 articles by computer animator Dale K. Myers and assassination researcher Todd W. Vaughan, who defended the prevailing belief that Zapruder's film captured the entire shooting sequence.

The authenticity of the image in frame 313 was disputed by Douglas Horne, Senior Analyst for the Assassination Records Review Board, and by Dino Brugioni of the CIA's National Photographic Interpretation Center (NPIC), who was considered one of the world's foremost imagery analysts. Horne learned that the NPIC worked on two different versions of the Zapruder film on Saturday and Sunday nights immediately following the Friday assassination.

The NPIC analysis was done by separate teams, which had been compartmentalized and ordered not to speak of their work. When Horne showed his findings and evidence to Brugioni, the latter re-examined a copy of the extant Zapruder film, provided by Horne. Brugioni concluded that the Zapruder film in the National Archives and available to the public, specifically frame 313, is an altered version of the film he saw and worked with on November 23–24, the earlier of the two versions handled by the NPIC.

Brugioni recalled seeing a "white cloud" of brain matter, three or four feet (91 or 122 cm) above Kennedy's head, and said that this "spray" lasted for more than one frame of the film. The version of the Zapruder film available to the public depicts the fatal head shot on only one frame of the film, frame 313. Brugioni was certain that the set of briefing boards available to the public in the National Archives is not the set that he and his team produced on November 23–24.

The Sixth Floor Museum at Dealey Plaza denies that the Zapruder film has been altered, or that any of the frames are missing from the film. Kodak engineer Ronald Zavada ran experiments with the same type of film that Zapruder used and concluded that the resulting motion picture is authentic.

== Cultural effect ==
In 1994, the Zapruder film footage was deemed "culturally, historically, or aesthetically significant" by the United States Library of Congress and was selected for permanent preservation in the National Film Registry.

Some critics have stated that the violence and shock of this home movie led to a new way of representing violence in 1970s American cinema, both in mainstream films, and particularly in indie and underground horror movies.

The Zapruder film has been included in feature films and other media, such as in Oliver Stone's JFK. A closeup from the segment showing the fatal shot to Kennedy's head is also shown in Wolfgang Petersen's In the Line of Fire (1993) starring Clint Eastwood. The Peter Landesman-directed Parkland (2013) stars Paul Giamatti as Zapruder, and dramatizes the events surrounding the creation and sale of the film.

Abraham Zapruder is sometimes presented as a forefather of all citizen journalists.

In "Murder Most Foul", a musical meditation on JFK's assassination and its effect on American counterculture, Bob Dylan sings "Zapruder's film I've seen that before / seen it 33 times maybe more".

Images from the Zapruder film were projected onto Lee Harvey Oswald's T-shirt in the 2004 revival of the Broadway musical Assassins.

== See also ==
- Kempler video, amateur video capturing the assassination of Israeli prime minister Yitzhak Rabin
- Pavel Hlava film, amateur video of the September 11 attacks notable for being the only recording to capture both strikes on the World Trade Center
- List of photographs considered the most important
