= The Brown Dots =

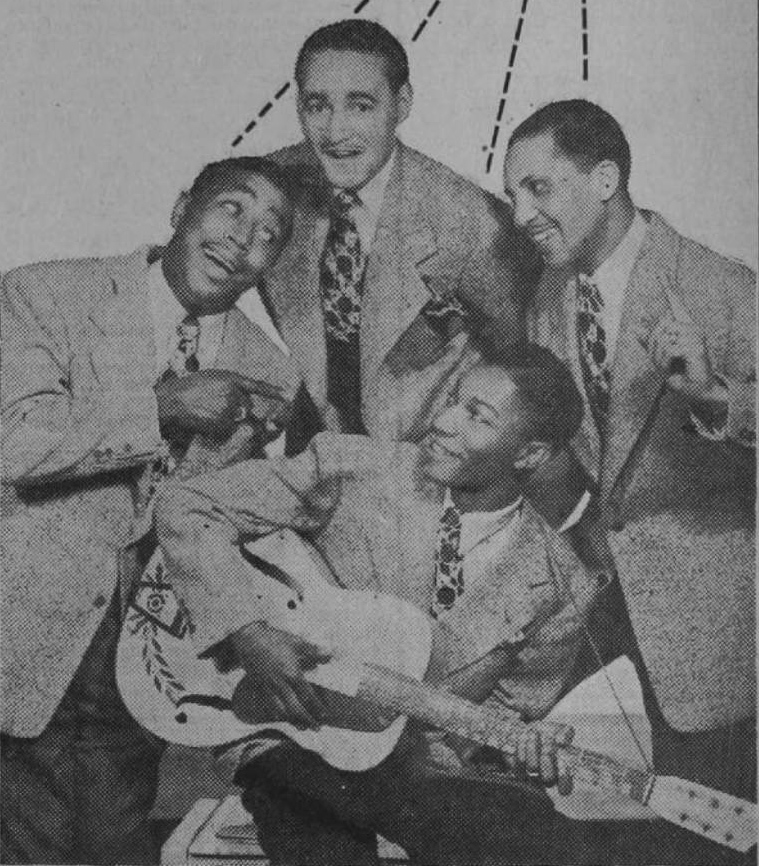
The Brown Dots in a 1945 advertisement

The Brown Dots were an American vocal group initially formed in late 1944, when second tenor Ivory "Deek" Watson (b. 18 July 1909, Mounds, Illinois - d. 4 November 1969, Washington, DC) left the Ink Spots. He immediately put together a competing Ink Spots group consisting of lead tenor Joe King, bass Jimmy Gordon, and an unknown baritone. By late January 1945, a lawsuit brought by the Ink Spots caused Deek Watson to claim that he would form a new group based on a "completely new idea". This new idea was simply to change their name to the Brown Dots and to sound as much like the Ink Spots as possible (although the Brown Dots employed more extensive harmonies). At this time, the unknown baritone left, to be replaced by baritone/guitarist William "Pat" Best.

== Overview ==
By March 1945, they were recording for Newark, New Jersey–based Manor records. At their first session, they recorded four songs, including "Sentimental Reasons" (written by Pat Best and led by Joe King). This song would become more popular through the years as "For Sentimental Reasons" or "(I Love You) For Sentimental Reasons".

There were hit versions of the song in 1946 for Nat King Cole and Charlie Spivak. 1947 saw charters by Eddy Howard, Dinah Shore, Ella Fitzgerald, and Art Kassel. Over the years, it's also been done by (among others) Smiley Lewis (1954), the Rivileers (1954), Sam Cooke (1958), Jesse Belvin (1959), the Voices Five (1959), Donnie Elbert (1960), the Cleftones (1961), the Spaniels (1961), Marvin Gaye & Mary Wells (1964), Rufus Thomas (1971), James Brown (1976) and Rod Stewart (2004).

By late summer or early fall, Joe King left, to be replaced by Jimmie Nabbie, who had originally wanted to be an operatic tenor.

Deek Watson always seemed to be in the middle of personality clashes. He had left the Ink Spots because of multiple clashes with Bill Kenny and Joe King had left the Brown Dots when he and Watson started fighting. By late 1946, Watson and the rest of the Brown Dots weren't getting along.

Rather than break up the group, Nabbie, Best, and Gordon recruited tenor Danny Owens. Originally calling themselves the Sentimentalists, they began recording for Manor behind Deek's back (just to see if they could make it on their own). When Deek finally found out, he left them and formed another Brown Dots group, about which next to nothing is known. (Some later Brown Dots records have a vocal group and some do not.)

The Sentimentalists started recording in earnest, including some backups to Savannah Churchill. However, bandleader Tommy Dorsey contacted them and asked them (politely) to cease using the "Sentimentalists" name (since he'd recently had a vocal group by that name, although they'd since changed their name to the Clark Sisters). However, since Dorsey was nice about it, they complied, changing their name to the 4 Tunes. Under this name, they would become the leading black Pop vocal group of the 1950s.

== Film appearance ==
The group appeared in films made for African American audiences, such as Boy! What a Girl! (1947), where they performed "Just in Case You Change Your Mind," and Sepia Cinderella, (1947) where they contributed the songs "Long Legged Lizzie" and "Is It Right".

== See also ==
- The Four Tunes
