= Of One Blood (film) =

- Release poster
- Directed by: Spencer Williams
- Screenplay by: Spencer Williams
- Produced by: H. W. Kier
- Starring: Spencer Williams; Geraldine Maynard
- Production company: Sack Amusement Enterprises
- Distributed by: Sack Attractions
- Release date: 1944; (Note: Some modern sources, for example the American Film Institute and Turner Classic Movies, list the film with a 1945 release date. However, records from industry publications state that the film was planned for release on September 15, 1944, and the San Antonio Register published an ad for showings at the Cameo Theatre in November 1944.)
- Running time: 61 minutes
- Country: United States
- Language: English

Of One Blood is a 1944 American race film directed, written by and starring Spencer Williams. The film focuses on two orphaned African American brothers who grow up to become a lawyer and a police officer, and who work together to break up a crime ring run by a miscreant who turns out to be their long-lost oldest brother.

== Release, reception, and legacy ==
Like many race films, all of Williams' works were thought to have been lost.

At the time, films were printed on nitrate film, which is highly flammable and liable to decompose, and only a few prints of Williams' films were made due to their low budget. However, most of his 1940s films have been rediscovered; many were found in a Tyler, Texas warehouse by film historian G. William Jones in 1983, alongside a number of independent exploitation films and prints of popular Hollywood films from the 1930s and 40s. Williams' works recovered in the collection were restored and now held at Southern Methodist University (SMU) as the Tyler, Texas, Black Film Collection.

Of One Blood was one of few films of Williams' not found in the Collection. However, a copy has been preserved in a different SMU collection, and another at the Library of Congress.

== See also ==
- List of films in the public domain in the United States

== Bibliography ==
- American Film Institute; Gevinson, Alan (1997). "Film Entries". Within Our Gates: Ethnicity in American Feature Films, 1911-1960. AFI Catalog of Feature Films. Berkeley, California: University of California Press. pp. 1–1176. ISBN 978-0-520-20964-0.
- Jones, G. William (1991). Black Cinema Treasures: Lost and Found. Denton, Texas: University of North Texas Press. ISBN 978-0-929398-26-6.
