= July Jones (actor) =

American actor

July Jones was an actor who had leading roles in several American films with African American casts.

== Filmography ==
- Beale Street Mama (1946)
- Dirty Gertie from Harlem U.S.A. (1946)
- Juke Joint (1947)
- The Girl in Room 20 (1949)
