= Emory Richardson =

- Born: Emory Speer Richardson; August 13, 1894; Marshallville, Georgia, US
- Died: February 7, 1965 (aged 70); Sydenham Hospital, New York, US
- Known for: Actor
- Parents: Edward Sumner Richardson Sr. (father); Anna Wade Richardson (mother)
- Relatives: Edward Sumner Richardson Jr., Marion Richardson, Blanche M Richardson

Emory Speer Richardson (August 13, 1894 – February 7 1965) was an actor who appeared in American films. He was also in numerous theatrical productions.

Richardson was born in Marshallville, Georgia to Edward Sumner Richardson Sr. and Anna Wade Richardson. He was African American.

He had several roles in the 1931 production The Green Pastures. He portrayed Lykon in the 1946 theatrical production Lysistrata. Sidney Poitier was also in the cast.

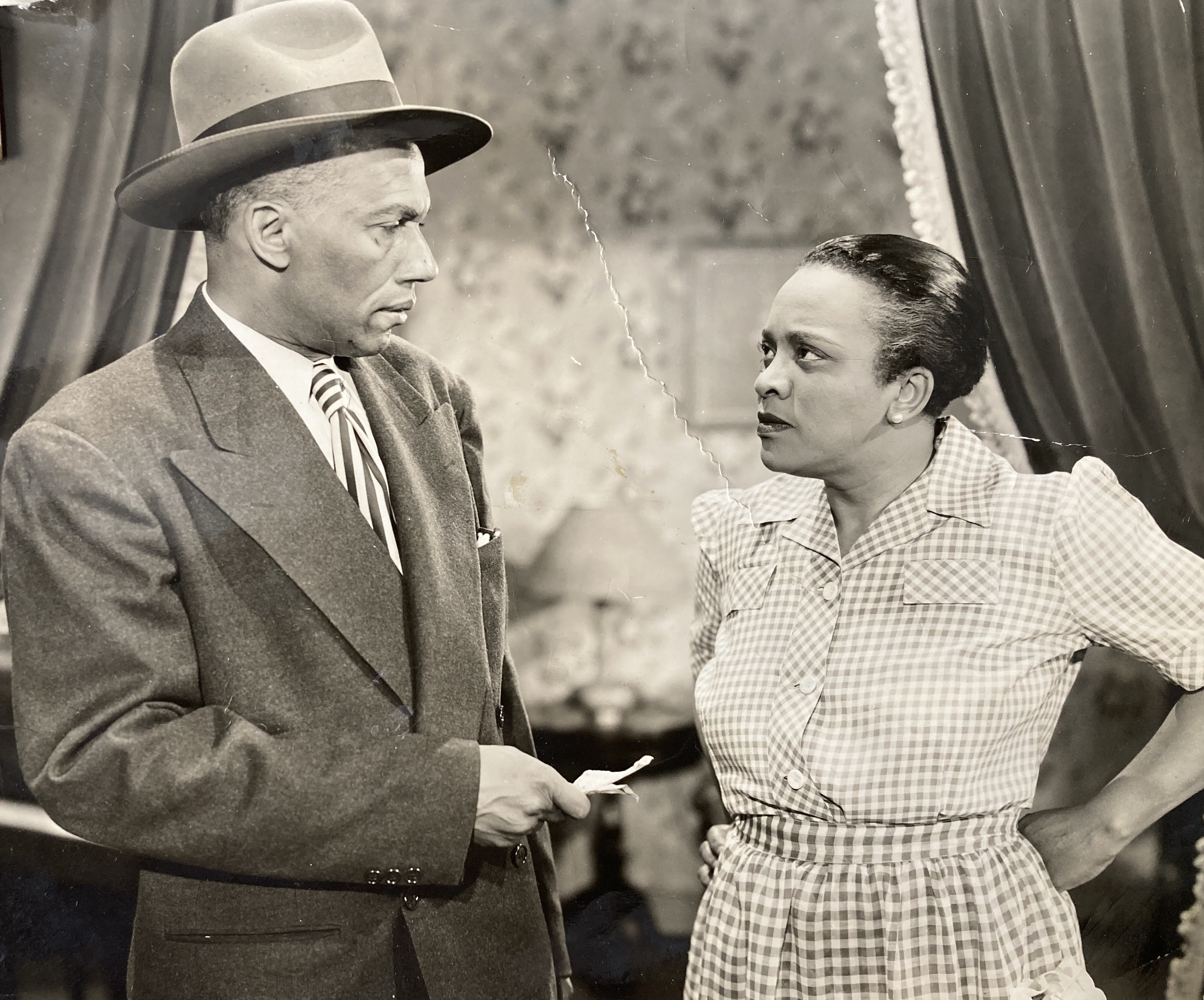
Emory Richardson and Loretta Mary Aiken in Boarding House Blues

He died after a long illness on February 7, 1965, at Sydenham Hospital, New York City. He had a son named Edward Richardson.

== Filmography ==
- Beware (1946) as Dean Hargreaves
- Sepia Cinderella (1947) as Great Joseph
- Boarding House Blues (1948) as Simon
- The Philadelphia Story as Edward
- The Fugitive Kind (1960) as Uncle Pleasant, the Conjure Man
