= Spencer Williams Jr. =

American actor and filmmaker (1893–1969)

Spencer Williams
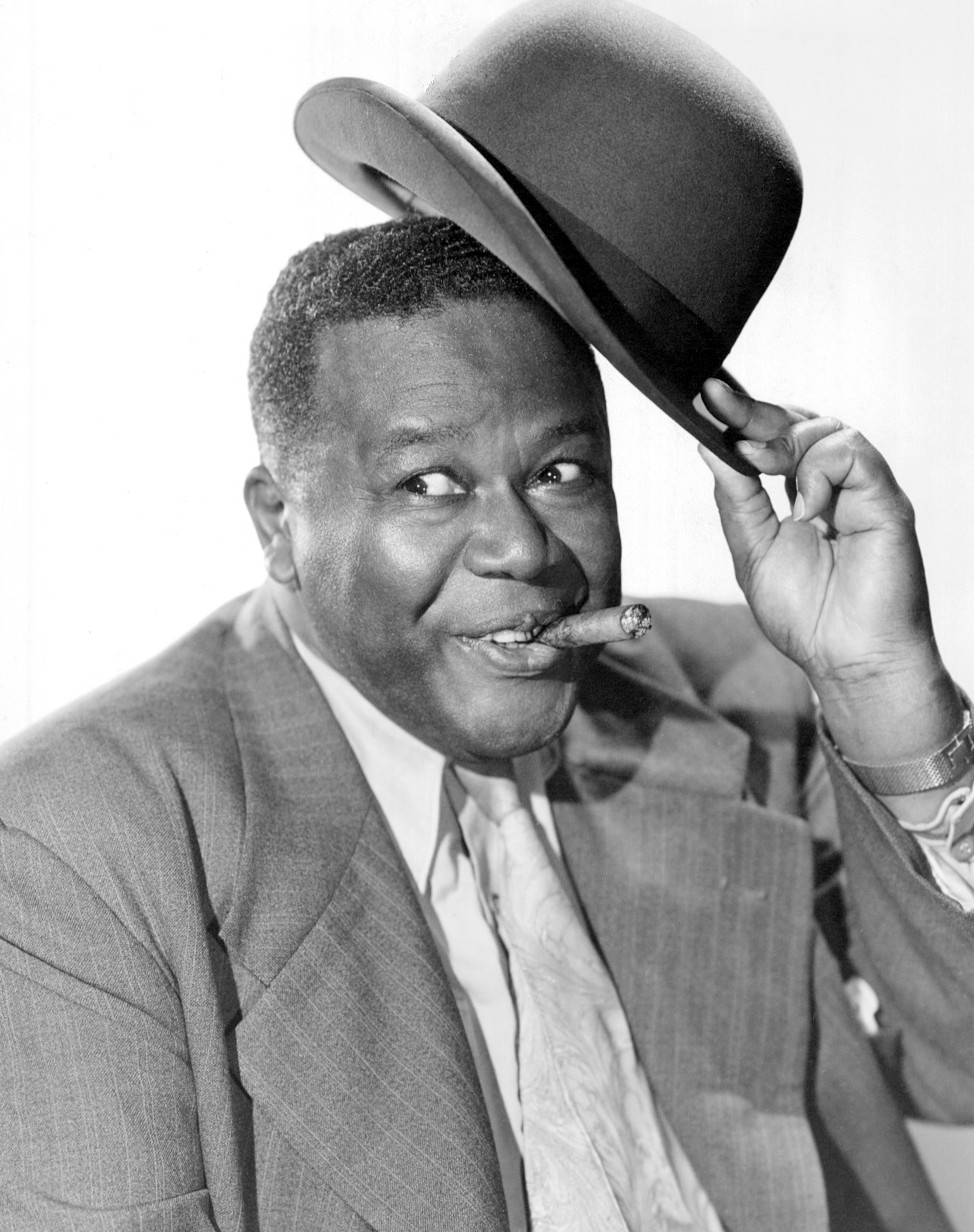
- Spencer Williams as Andy in The Amos 'n' Andy Show.
- Born: July 14, 1893; Vidalia, Louisiana, U.S.
- Died: December 13, 1969 (aged 76); Los Angeles, California, U.S.
- Resting place: Los Angeles National Cemetery; Section 209, row Z, space 3
- Education: University of Minnesota
- Occupations: Actor, film director, screenwriter
- Years active: 1928–1962
- Military career
- Allegiance: United States
- Branch: United States Army
- Rank: Sergeant Major
- Conflicts: Pancho Villa Expedition; World War I

Spencer Williams Jr. (July 14, 1893 – December 13, 1969) was an American actor, film director, and screenwriter. He was a pioneering African American filmmaker from the late 1920s through the 1940s, directing a number of notable race films including The Blood of Jesus (1941). He saw further popularity in the 1950s as an actor, portraying Andy on TV's The Amos 'n' Andy Show.

== Early life ==
Williams was born in Vidalia, Louisiana. He moved to New York City as a teenager and secured work as call boy for the theatrical impresario Oscar Hammerstein. During this period, he received mentoring in comedy from the African-American vaudeville star Bert Williams (no relation).

Williams studied at the University of Minnesota and served in the U.S. Army during and after World War I, rising to the rank of sergeant major, serving first as General Pershing's bugler in Mexico and, after promotion to sergeant major, as an intelligence officer in France.

== Career ==
=== Early work ===
He arrived in Hollywood in 1923 and his involvement with films began by assisting with works by Octavus Roy Cohen. Williams snagged bit roles in motion pictures, including a part in the 1928 Buster Keaton film Steamboat Bill, Jr. He found steady work after arriving in California apart from a short period in 1926 where there were no roles for him; he then went to work as an immigration officer. In 1927, Williams was working for the First National Studio, going on location to Topaz, Arizona to shoot footage for a film called The River.

In 1929, Williams was hired by producer Al Christie to create the dialogue for a series of two-reel comedy films with all-black casts. Williams gained the trust of Christie and was eventually appointed the responsibility to create The Melancholy Dame. This film is considered the first black talkie. The films, which played on racial stereotypes and used grammatically tortured dialogue, included The Framing of the Shrew, The Lady Fare, Melancholy Dame, (first Paramount all African-American cast "talkie"), Music Hath Charms, and Oft in the Silly Night. Williams wore many hats at Christie's; he was a sound technician, wrote many of the scripts and was assistant director for many of the films. He was also hired to cast African-Americans for Gloria Swanson's Queen Kelly (1928) and produced the talkie short film Hot Biskits, which he wrote and directed, in the same year. Williams also did some work for Columbia as the supervisor of their Africa Speaks recordings. Williams was also active in theater productions, taking a role in the all African-American version of Lulu Belle in 1929.

Due to the pressures of the depression coupled with the lowering demand for black short films, Williams and Christie separated ways. Williams struggled for employment during the years of the Depression and would only occasionally be cast in small roles. Movies included a brief appearance in Warner Bros.’ gangster film The Public Enemy (1931) in which he was uncredited.

By 1931, Williams and a partner had founded their own movie and newsreel company called the Lincoln Talking Pictures Company. The company was self-financed. Williams, who had experience in sound technology, built the equipment, including a sound truck, for his new venture.

=== Directing race films ===
During the 1930s, Williams secured small roles in race films, a genre of low-budget, independently-produced films with all-black casts that were created solely for exhibition in racially segregated theaters. Williams also created two screenplays for race film production: the Western film Harlem Rides the Range and the horror-comedy Son of Ingagi, both released in 1939.

After a three-year hiatus from show business during the Great Depression, Williams began finding work again. He was cast in Jed Buell’s Black westerns between the years of 1938 and 1940. He played character roles in such black westerns as Harlem on the Prairie (1937), Two-Gun Man from Harlem (1938), The Bronze Buckaroo (1939), and Harlem Rides the Range (1939). Buell’s idea to hire Williams revolved around his ability to captivate the audience with his showmanship. Williams’ involvement in these films gave him a valuable learning experience in the black film genre. Although these films were considered to be crude films in their creation, Williams got the opportunity to start directing here and there even though his control was scarce.

Alfred N. Sack, whose San Antonio, later Dallas, Texas based company Sack Amusement Enterprises produced and distributed race films, was impressed with Williams’ screenplay for Son of Ingagi and offered him the opportunity to write and direct a feature film. At that time, the only African American filmmaker was the self-financing writer/director/producer Oscar Micheaux. Besides being a film production company, Sack also had interests in movie theaters. He had more than one name for his ventures; they were also known as Sack Attractions and Harlemwood Studios. Sack produced films under all of his company's various names.

With his own film projector, Williams began traveling in the southern US, showing his films to audiences there. During this time, he met William H. Kier, who was also traveling the same circuit showing films. The two formed a partnership and produced some motion pictures, training films for the Army Air Forces, as well as a film for the Catholic diocese of Tulsa, Oklahoma.

=== The Blood of Jesus ===
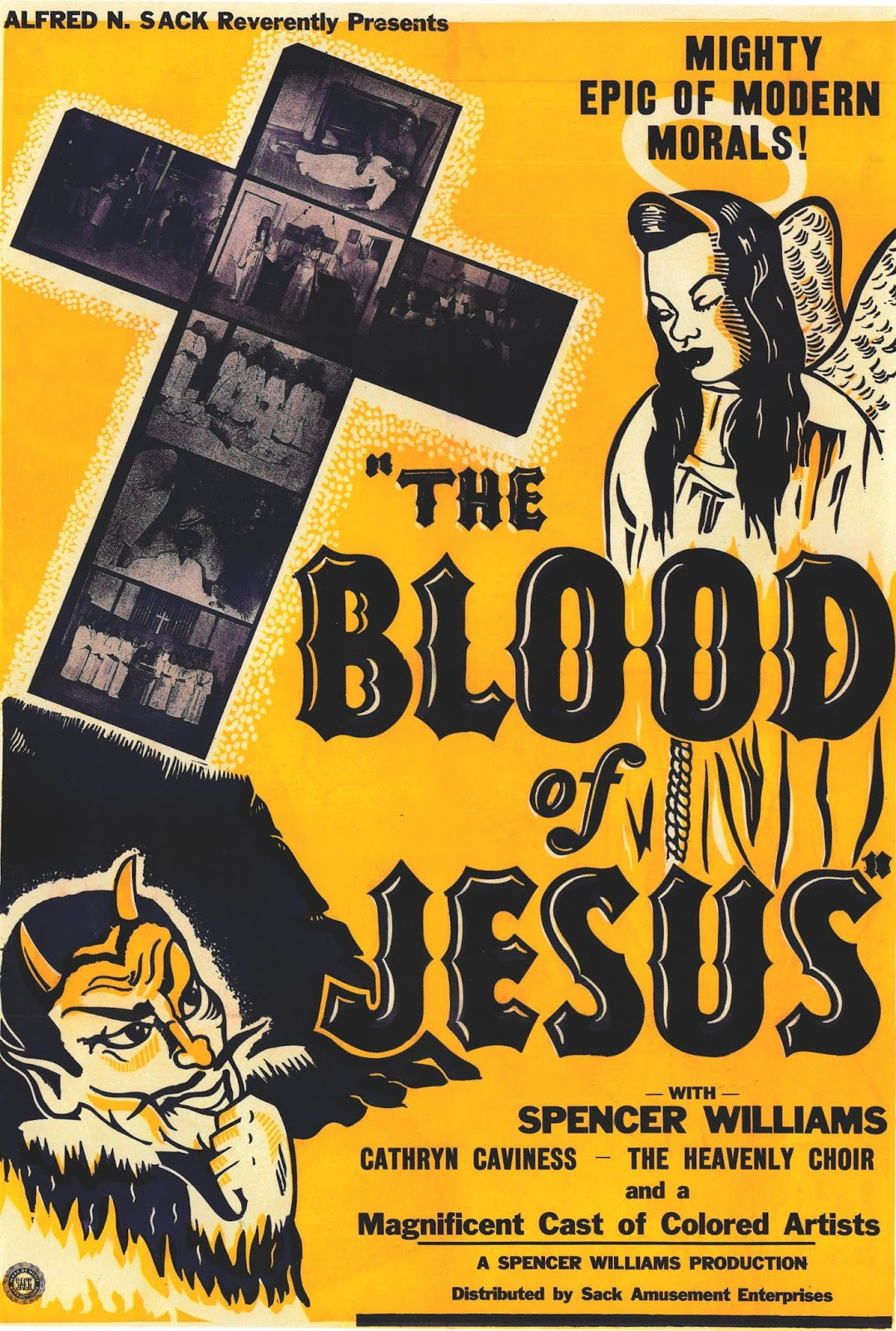
Theatrical release poster for The Blood of Jesus (1941), Williams's directorial debut.

Williams's resulting film, The Blood of Jesus (1941), was produced by his own company, Amegro, on a $5,000 budget using non-professional actors for his cast. It was the first film he directed and Williams also wrote the screenplay. A religious fantasy about the struggle for a dying’ Christian woman’s soul, the film was a major commercial success. Sack declared The Blood of Jesus was "possibly the most successful" race film ever made, and Williams was invited to direct additional films for Sack Amusement Enterprises.

There were problems that the producers faced with the technical aspects of the film. Despite these issues, Williams used his expertise to help with the camera, special effects and symbolism. The themes that he used in the film helped the film receive praise. Religious themes, including Protestantism and Southern Baptist, helped underpin the narrative.

=== Subsequent work ===
Despite the success that The Blood of Jesus enjoyed, Williams's next film was considered an epic failure and seen by few. The attempt to create a wartime drama resulted in the film Marching On! (1943). Set with World War II as the backdrop, the film was badly made and was left in the shadow of the Army financed film The Negro Soldier (1944). Most of the narrative seen in Marching On was influenced by William’s own time in the army during World War I. Due to an uneven and uninteresting plot the film was seen as a dud and was unable to garner the social acknowledgment that Williams had hoped it would receive.

Williams's next film, Go Down Death (1944), is considered to be on par with The Blood of Jesus as the best overall primitive film that Williams made. Just like that movie, Williams directed, wrote the screenplay, and acted in the film. He gained inspiration for the story of the screenplay from the fable of the same name, written by the poet James Weldon Johnson.

The years after his most successful films and the years preceding his mainstream success with Amos 'n' Andy found Williams in another career rut. Rather than continuing to make film in his primitive format, he began to try to follow mainstream Hollywood conventions. Williams's attempts to conform in the film industry actually began to bog down his stories and his otherwise original films.

In the next six years, Williams directed Brother Martin: Servant of Jesus (1942), Marching On! (1943), Go Down Death (1944), Of One Blood (1944), Dirty Gertie from Harlem U.S.A. (1946), The Girl in Room 20 (1946), Beale Street Mama (1947) and Juke Joint (1947). After working ten years in Dallas, Williams returned to Hollywood in 1950.

Following the production of Juke Joint, Williams relocated to Tulsa, Oklahoma, where he joined Amos T. Hall in founding the American Business and Industrial College for GIs.

=== Amos 'n' Andy ===
Prior to his involvement with Amos 'n' Andy, Williams was immensely popular among the African-American audiences. U.S. radio comedians Freeman Gosden and Charles Correll, who cast Williams as Andy, were able to claim that they were the ones who found Williams and gave him the chance to be seen in the limelight because he was virtually unknown amongst the white audience.

In 1948, Gosden and Correll were planning to take their long-running comedy program Amos 'n Andy to television. The program focused on the misadventures of a group of African Americans in the Harlem section of New York City. Gosden and Correll were white, but played the black lead characters using racially stereotypical speech patterns. They had previously played the roles in blackface make-up for the 1930 film Check and Double Check, but the television version used an African American cast.

Gosden and Correll conducted an extensive national talent search to cast the television version of Amos 'n Andy. News of the search reached Tulsa, where Williams was sought out by a local radio station that was aware of his previous work in race films. A Catholic priest, who was a radio listener and a friend, was the key to the whereabouts of Williams. He was working in Tulsa as the head of a vocational school for veterans when the casting call went out. Williams successfully auditioned for Gosden and Correll, and he was cast as Andrew H. Brown. Williams was joined in the cast by New York theater actor Alvin Childress, who was cast as Amos, and vaudeville comedian Tim Moore, who was cast as their friend George "Kingfish" Stevens. When Williams accepted the role of Andy, he returned to a familiar location; the CBS studios were built on the former site of the Christie Studios. Until Amos 'n' Andy, Williams had never worked in television. Amos 'n Andy was the first U.S. television program with an all-black cast, running for 78 episodes on CBS from 1951 to 1953. However, the program created considerable controversy, with the NAACP going to federal court to achieve an injunction to halt its premiere. In August 1953, after the program had recently left the air, there were plans to turn it into a vaudeville act with Williams, Moore and Childress reprising their television roles. It is not known if there were any performances. After the show completed its network run, CBS syndicated Amos 'n Andy to local U.S. television stations and sold the program to television networks in other countries. The program was eventually pulled from release in 1966, under pressure from civil rights groups that stated it offered a negatively distorted view of African American life. The show would not be seen on nationwide television again until 2012.

While the show was still in production, Williams and Freeman Gosden clashed over the portrayal of Andy, with Gosden telling Williams he knew how Amos 'n' Andy were meant to talk. Gosden never visited the set again.

Williams, along with television show cast members Tim Moore, Alvin Childress, and Lillian Randolph and her choir, began a US tour as "The TV Stars of Amos 'n' Andy" in 1956. CBS considered this a violation of their exclusivity rights for the show and its characters; the tour came to a premature end. Williams, Moore, Childress and Johnny Lee, performed a one-night show in Windsor, Ontario in 1957, apparently without any legal action being taken.

Williams returned to work in stage productions. In 1958, he had a role in the Los Angeles production of Simply Heavenly; the play had a successful New York run. His last credited role was as a hospital orderly in the 1962 Italian horror production 'L'Orribile Segreto del Dottor Hitchcock.

After his failed attempts to find success in the film industry once again, Williams decided to fully retire and began to live off of his pension that he was receiving from his time with the US Military.

== Death and legacy ==
Williams died of a kidney ailment on December 13, 1969, at the Sawtelle Veterans Administration Hospital in Los Angeles, California. He was survived by his wife, Eula. At the time of his death, news coverage focused solely on his work as a television actor, since few white filmgoers knew of his race films. The New York Times obituary for Williams cited Amos 'n Andy but made no mention of his work as a film director. A World War I veteran, he is buried at Los Angeles National Cemetery.

When friends and family from Vidalia, Louisiana were interviewed for a local newspaper article in 2001, he was remembered as a happy person, who was always singing or whistling and telling jokes. His younger cousins also recalled his generosity with them for "candy money"; just as he was seen on television as Andy, he always had his cigar. On March 31, 2010, the state of Louisiana voted to honor Williams and musician Will Haney, also from Vidalia, in a celebration on May 22 of that year.

== Career re-evaluation ==
Despite his contribution as a pioneer in black American film of the 1930s and the 1940s, Williams was almost completely forgotten after his death. While even to this day his legacy doesn’t enjoy the same recognition and praise that other black film pioneers such as Oscar Micheaux, in his time, Williams was considered one of the few successful black Americans involved in the film industry during this period. Recognition for Williams’ work as a film director came years after his death, when film historians began to rediscover the race films. Some of Williams’ films were considered lost until they were located in a Tyler, Texas, warehouse in 1983. One film directed by Williams, his 1942 feature Brother Martin: Servant of Jesus, is still considered lost. There were seven films in total; they were originally shown at small gatherings throughout the South.

Most film historians consider The Blood of Jesus to be Williams’ crowning achievement as a filmmaker. Dave Kehr of The New York Times called the film "magnificent" and Time magazine counted it among its "25 Most Important Films on Race." In 1991, The Blood of Jesus became the first race film to be added to the U.S. National Film Registry.

Film critic Armond White named both The Blood of Jesus and Go Down Death as being "among the most spiritually adventurous movies ever made. They conveyed the moral crisis of the urban/country, blues/spiritual musical dichotomies through their documentary style and fable-like narratives."

However, Williams’ films have also been the subject of criticism. Richard Corliss, writing in Time magazine, stated: "Aesthetically, much of Williams' work vacillates between inert and abysmal. The rural comedy of Juke Joint is logy, as if the heat had gotten to the movie; even the musical scenes, featuring North Texas jazzman Red Calhoun, move at the turtle tempo of Hollywood's favorite black of the period, Stepin Fetchit. And there were technical gaffes galore: in a late-night scene in Dirty Gertie, actress Francine Everett clicks on a bedside lamp and the screen actually darkens for a moment before full lights finally come up. Yet at least one Williams film, his debut Blood of Jesus (1941), has a naive grandeur to match its subject." It should also be realized that Williams often worked on a very meager budget. The Blood of Jesus was filmed for a cost of $5,000; most black films of that era had budgets of double and triple that amount.

Williams began writing a book about his 55 years in show business in 1959.

== Filmography ==
Williams is credited as both an actor and a director.

=== Actor ===
- Tenderfeet (Short Film, 1928)
- The Melancholy Dame (Short Film, 1929)
- Music Hath Harms (Short Film, 1929)
- The Framing of the Shrew (Short Film, 1929)
- Oft in the Silly Night (Short Film, 1929)
- The Lady Fare (Short Film, 1929)
- Brown Gravy (Short Film, 1929)
- Fowl Play (Short Film, 1929)
- The Widow's Bite (Short Film, 1929)
- Georgia Rose (1930)
- Reno (1930)
- The Virginia Judge (1935)
- Coronado (1935)
- Harlem on the Prairie (1937)
- Two-Gun Man from Harlem (1938)
- The Bronze Buckaroo (1939)
- Harlem Rides the Range (1939)
- Bad Boy (1939)
- Son of Ingagi (1940)
- Toppers Take a Bow (Short Film, 1941)
- The Blood of Jesus (1941)
- Brother Martin: Servant of Jesus (1942)
- Of One Blood (1944)
- Go Down, Death! (1944)
- The Negro Sailor (1945)
- Beale Street Mama (1946)
- The Girl in Room 20 (1946)
- Dirty Gertie from Harlem U.S.A. (1946)
- Juke Joint (1947)
- Rhapsody of Negro Life (Short Film, 1949)
- Amos 'n' Andy (TV Series, 78 Episodes, 1951-1955)
- Bourbon Street Beat (TV Series, 1 Episode, 1959)

=== Director ===
- Hot Biskits (1931), a 10 minute comedy short he wrote, directed, and co-starred in
- The Blood of Jesus (1941)
- Brother Martin: Servant of Jesus (1942)
- Marching On! (1943)
- Of One Blood (1944)
- Go Down, Death! (1944)
- Harlem Hotshots (Short Film, 1945)
- Beale Street Mama (1946)
- The Girl in Room 20 (1946)
- Jivin’ in Be-Bop (Documentary, 1946)
- Dirty Gertie from Harlem U.S.A. (1946)
- Juke Joint (1947)
- Rhapsody of Negro Life (Short Films, 1949)
