= The Philadelphia Story (1959 film) =

1959 US television film directed by Fielder Cook

- Based on: The Philadelphia Story; 1939 play by Philip Barry
- Written by: Audrey Maas
- Screenplay by: Jacqueline Babbin
- Directed by: Fielder Cook
- Starring: Gig Young; Mary Astor; Don DeFore
- Country of origin: United States
- Original language: English

Production
- Producer: David Susskind
- Running time: 90 minutes
- Production company: Talent Associates

Original release
- Network: NBC
- Release: December 7, 1959

The Philadelphia Story is a 1959 American TV adaptation of the play The Philadelphia Story by Philip Barry. It was directed by Fielder Cook.

== Cast ==
- Gig Young as C.K. Dexter Haven
- Diana Lynn as Tracy Lord
- Christopher Plummer as Mike Connor
- Ruth Roman as Liz Imbrie
- Mary Astor as Margaret Lord
- Don DeFore as George Kitteridge
- Gaye Huston as Dinah Lord
- Leon Janney as Sidney Kidd
- Emory Richardson as Edward
- Alan Webb as Seth Lord

== Production ==
It was produced by Talent Associates.
