= Elwood Smith (actor) =

Elwood Smith was an actor in theatrical productions and films. He acted in several theatrical productions and performed the roles of Ragsdale and Compere in the New York productions of St. Louis Woman and Four Saints in Three Acts, respectively.

Smith was educated at Juilliard and sang with the Xavier University Opera Guild. He was a featured performer on a New Orleans radio show sponsored by American Brewing Company's Regal beer.

== Theater ==
- Home of the Hunter (1945)
- St. Louis Woman (1946)
- City of Kings (play)
- Pot Luck (1953)
- The Love of Don Perlimplín for Belisa in Their Garden, an adaptation of Federico García Lorca's play The Love of Don Perlimplín and Belisa in the Garden.
- A Raisin in the Sun (National Tour, 1960)

== Filmography ==
=== Film ===
- Boy! What a Girl! (1947)
- The Fight Never Ends (1948)

=== Television ===
- The Bitter Cup (1951, TV movie)
