= Sepia Cinderella =

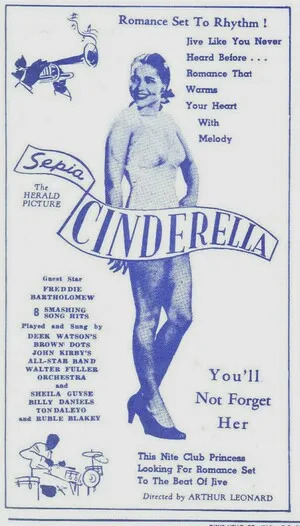
- Directed by: Arthur H. Leonard
- Written by: Vincent Valentini
- Produced by: Jack Goldberg; Arthur H. Leonard
- Cinematography: George Webber
- Edited by: Jack Kemp
- Distributed by: Herald Pictures
- Release date: July 25, 1947
- Running time: 70 minutes; 75 minutes (American original release)
- Country: United States
- Language: English

Sepia Cinderella is a 1947 American musical race film directed by Arthur H. Leonard. The film is notable for musical numbers by vocalists Billy Daniels and Sheila Guyse, and for a brief guest appearance by former child star Freddie Bartholomew, who is onscreen as himself for five minutes, telling gags to recharge his post-war career. It was the film debut of Sidney Poitier, who had an uncredited role.

== Plot ==
A young woman, Barbara, is in love with a good and kind bandleader, Bob, who seems oblivious to her love. Barbara helps Bob write a new song, "Cinderella", and it becomes an unexpected hit. Success and sudden fame lead Bob to abandon his former performing venue and lose touch with his friends. He becomes caught in the talons of a devious female club-owner who milks his success and tries to also seduce him, even though she is engaged, unbeknownst to Bob. As his career crumbles and the scales fall from his eyes, Bob's press agent finally finds a way for things to end happily: Bob will make a comeback and in doing so will choose a woman's shoe out of dozens entered, and the winner will sing with him and have her prince. Bob rightly picks Barbara's shoe, and the show goes out on yet another great musical number.

== Cast ==
- Billy Daniels as Bob
- Sheila Guyse as Barbara
- Tondaleyo as Vivian
- Ruble Blakey as Barney
- Jack Carter as Ralph
- Dusty Freeman as Mooney
- George Williams as Sonny
- Fred Gordon as press agent Lester Green
- Harold Norton as Night Club Master of Ceremonies
- Hilda Offley as Mama Keyes
- Emory Richardson as Great Joseph
- Percy Verwayne as MacMillan
- Al Young as Chinaman
- Deek Watson as Himself
- Gertrude Saunders as Mrs. Dryden
- William Greaves as Nightclub Patron
- Freddie Bartholomew as himself
- Sidney Poitier as Extra (uncredited)
- Ann Blazier as Mrs. Blazier

== Soundtrack ==
- Deek Watson and The Brown Dots - "Long Legged Lizzie" (Words and music by Herman Fairbanks and Deek Watson)
- Deek Watson and The Brown Dots - "Is It Right" (Words and music by Deek Watson and William "Pat" Best)
- Billy Daniels and Sheila Guyse - "Cinderella" (Words and music by Walter Fuller)
- Billy Daniels - "Ring Around My Rosie" (Words and music by Walter Fuller)
- Credited in the opening titles, may be used in the background - "Can't Find a Thing to Say" (Words and music by Milt Shaw)
- Ruble Blakey - "Oh Ho! It's a Lovely Day" (Words and music by Eric Miller, Ruble Blakey and Rudy Toombs)

== Home media ==
Sepia Cinderella was released on Region 0 DVD by Alpha Video, as part of a double feature with Dirty Gertie from Harlem U.S.A., on July 31, 2007.

== See also ==
- List of films in the public domain in the United States
