= Alfred N. Sack =

American film distributor (1898–1969)

Alfred N. Sack (October 22, 1898 – March 1, 1969) was an American businessperson, newspaper publisher and the proprietor of film distribution, production, and the theater-owning business Sack Amusements in the United States.. He collaborated with Spencer Williams to make films with Black casts. Sack Amusement Enterprises was the leading distributor of this type of film between 1920 and 1950.

== Biography ==
Sack was born in Greenville, Mississippi. He worked as a newspaper publisher in the 1920s between stints in the film industry.

His business, Sack Amusements, included many films starring African American casts, so-called race films. He worked with his brother Lester. They were Jewish. They partnered with Spencer Williams on several films. Sack distributed several Oscar Micheaux films.

Sack secured a deal with RKO to distribute four two-reel films of "Negro spirituals". The brothers re-released some films. The brothers purchased the Lucas Theatre in Dallas, Texas. He opened the Coronet Theatre in Dallas in 1948. It opened as an art house theatre but by the time he sold it in 1967, it was an adult film theatre.

Sack had a daughter, Sarah Lee Sack. Sarah Lee Sack's blindness was discovered when she was a few days old; her disability inspired Sack to become active in helping blind children.

He had a heart attack in 1959.

Go Down, Death! was adapted from a poem by James Weldon Johnson.

== Filmography ==
- St. Louis Blues (1929)
- The Black King (1932)
- She Devil (1934), distributor
- Princess Tam Tam (1935), distributor, a French film adaptation of Pygmalion blocked from major distribution channels by censors in the U.S.
- The Broken Earth (1936)
- Underworld (1937), distributor
- Harlem on the Prairie (1937), distributor
- Policy Man (1938)
- Two-Gun Man from Harlem (1938), distributor
- Harlem Rides the Range (1939)
- The Devil's Daughter (1939)
- Midnight Shadow (1939)
- Moon Over Harlem (1939)
- The Bronze Buckaroo (1939)
- Lying Lips (1939)
- Gang War (1940 film)
- Son of Ingagi (1940)
- The Blood of Jesus (1941), distributor
- Marching On! (1943), directed by Spencer Williams
- Of One Blood (1944), directed by Spencer Williams
- Go Down, Death! (1944)
- Harlem Hotshots (1940) (short subject)
- Beale Street Mama (1946)
- Dirty Gertie from Harlem U.S.A. (1946)
- Juke Joint (film) (1947)
- Murder with Music (1948)
- The Girl in Room 20 (1949)
