= Dirty Gertie from Harlem U.S.A. =

- Poster art for the theatrical release
- Directed by: Spencer Williams
- Written by: True T. Thompson
- Produced by: Bert Goldberg
- Starring: Francine Everett; Don Wilson; Inez Newell; July Jones; Spencer Williams
- Cinematography: John L. Herman
- Distributed by: Sack Amusement Enterprises
- Release date: 1946 (U.S.)
- Running time: 65 minutes
- Country: United States
- Language: English

Dirty Gertie from Harlem U.S.A. is a 1946 race film directed by Spencer Williams and produced and distributed by Sack Amusement Enterprises.

This film is in the public domain.

== Plot ==
Gertie LaRue (Francine Everett) is a nightclub entertainer from the Harlem neighborhood of New York City. She arrives on the Caribbean island of "Rinidad" to perform as the headliner in a revue at the Paradise Hotel. Gertie has earned the nickname "Dirty Gertie" for the casual way in which she entices and then humiliates men. On the island, she attracts the attention of two young Americans—a soldier and a sailor—whom she nicknames "Tight Pants" and "High Pockets," respectively. The men enjoy sharing Gertie’s affections. However, Diamond Joe, the owner of the hotel, finds himself falling for Gertie and begins to shower her with gifts.

Gertie also attracts the attention of two missionaries, Mr. Christian and Ezra Crumm, who keep watch on Gertie’s activities. However, a former boyfriend from Harlem tracks Gertie to the island. Unable to possess her, the ex-boyfriend kills her while insisting that he loves her.

== Cast ==
The cast includes:

- Francine Everett
- Don Wilson
- Inez Newell
- July Jones
- Spencer Williams

== Production ==
Dirty Gertie from Harlem U.S.A. is an unauthorized adaptation of the 1921 W. Somerset Maugham short story "Rain", which had been adapted as the John Colton-Clemence Randolph play Rain. The property had been filmed twice before this version: as the 1928 Sadie Thompson starring Gloria Swanson and the 1932 Rain starring Joan Crawford. This adaptation changed the names of the characters, switched the location from the Pacific Rim to the Caribbean, and gave the female lead a career in entertainment (the original concept had her as a prostitute).

It was directed by Spencer Williams, an African-American actor and writer who directed a series of race films during the 1940s for the Dallas, Texas-based producer Alfred Sack, who distributed these all-black productions to cinemas catering to African-American audiences. Williams appeared in Dirty Gertie from Harlem U.S.A. as a female fortune teller who predicts Gertie’s death.

Dirty Gertie from Harlem U.S.A. was the last starring role in a feature movie for Francine Everett, who was a star in race films, most notably Keep Punching (1939) and Big Timers (1945). After completing this film, she had bit roles in two Hollywood productions, Lost Boundaries (1949) and No Way Out (1950), before retiring from acting.

Dirty Gertie from Harlem U.S.A. was a commercially successful title on the race film circuit, but it was not widely seen by white audiences until the 1990s. The film is a public domain title.

== Home media ==
Dirty Gertie from Harlem U.S.A. was released on Region 0 DVD by Alpha Video, as part of a double feature with Sepia Cinderella, on July 31, 2007.

== See also ==
- List of films in the public domain in the United States
