= Marching On! =

- Directed by: Spencer Williams
- Written by: Spencer Williams (writer)
- Produced by: H.W. Kier (producer)
- Starring: See below
- Cinematography: Clark Ramsey
- Release date: 1943
- Country: United States
- Language: English

Marching On! is a 1943 American race film directed and written by Spencer Williams. Sequences were filmed at Fort Huachuca, Arizona. The film was later rereleased with additional musical sequences under the title Where's My Man To-nite?.

== Plot ==
The film focuses on a young African American who continues his family’s tradition of military service when he is drafted into the United States Army during World War II. Despite complications that arise during his basic training, including his jealousy following his girlfriend's flirtatious attention to his sergeant, the young soldier becomes a hero when he locates Japanese saboteurs operating a radio station outside of his military base.

== Cast ==
- Hugo Martin as Rodney Tucker Jr.
- George T. Sutton as Gramps Sam Tucker
- Emmet Jackson as Sgt. Robert L. Keene
- "Pepper" Neely as Wash, soldier
- Mickey McZekkashing as Wimpy, soldier
- Myra D. Hemmings as Mrs. Ellen Tucker
- Clarissy Deary as Ginny
- L.K. Smith as Rufus
- John Hemmings as Rodney Tucker Sr.
- Georgia Kelly as Martha Adams
