= The Blood of Jesus =

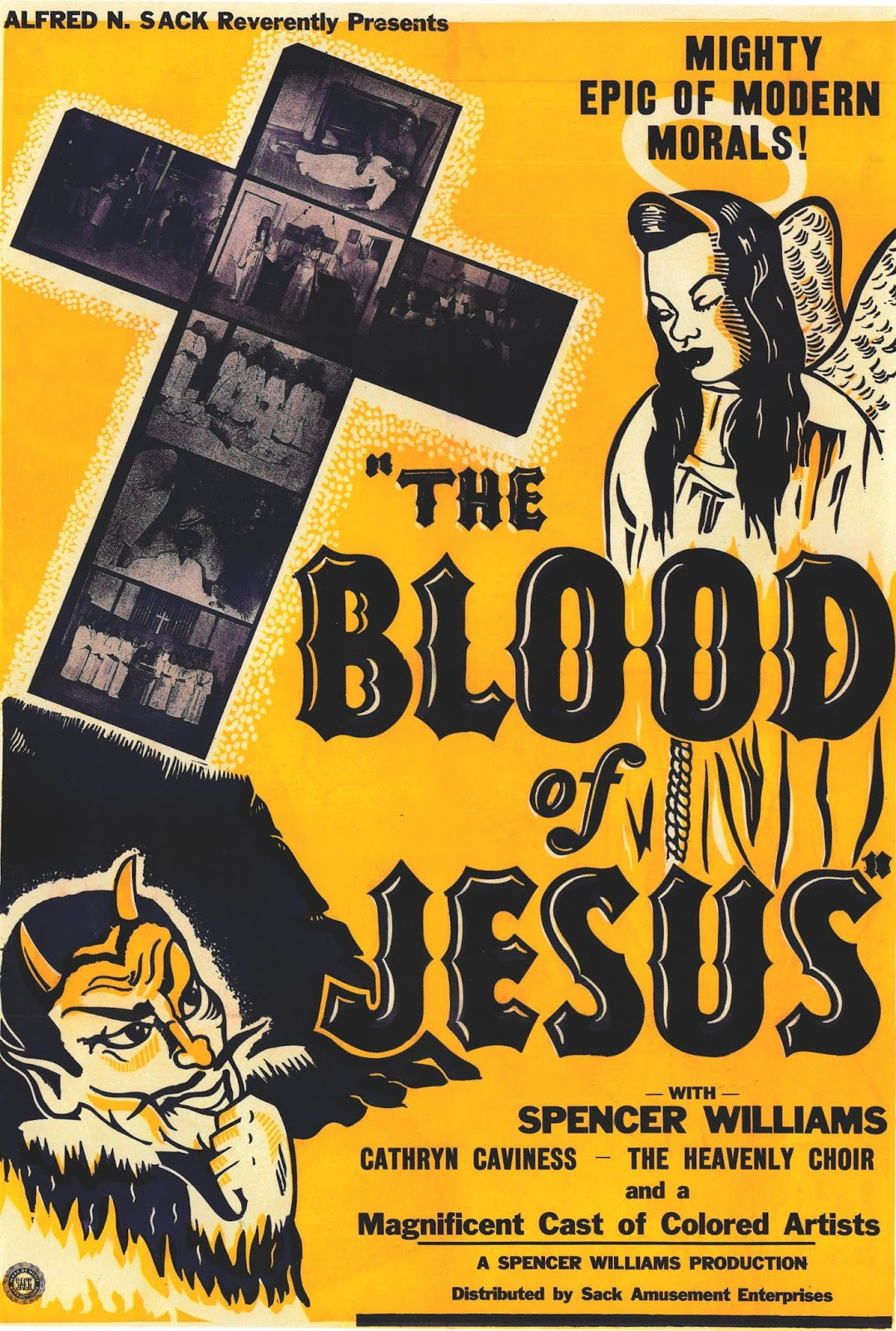
- Theatrical release poster
- Directed by: Spencer Williams
- Written by: Spencer Williams
- Produced by: Spencer Williams; Alfred N. Sack
- Starring: Spencer Williams; Cathryn Caviness
- Cinematography: Jack Whitman
- Distributed by: Sack Amusement Enterprises; Avernus Productions
- Release date: April 26, 1941
- Running time: 56 minutes
- Country: United States
- Language: English
- Budget: $5,000

The Blood of Jesus (1941) by Spencer Williams

The Blood of Jesus (also known as The Glory Road) is a 1941 American independent fantasy drama race film written, directed by and starring Spencer Williams. The plot concerns a Baptist woman who, after being accidentally shot by her husband, is sent to a crossroads, where Satan tries to lead her astray.

The film was very successful and, in 1991, was selected for preservation in the National Film Registry by the Library of Congress, being deemed "culturally, historically, or aesthetically significant".

== Plot ==
In a small rural village with an African American population, a church group is holding a riverside baptismal service, and one of the faithful being immersed is the recently married Martha (Cathryn Caviness). However, Martha's husband Ras (Spencer Williams) is absent from the service – he claims he was hunting, but he actually poached a neighbor's boar. At home, Ras accidentally shoots Martha when his rifle drops on the floor and discharges. The church congregation gathers at Martha's bedside to pray for her recovery, and during this period an angel (Rogenia Goldthwaite) arrives to take Martha's spirit from her body. She is brought to the Crossroads between Heaven and Hell, and initially she is tempted by the slick Judas Green (Frank H. McClennan), who is an agent for Satan (James B. Jones). Judas takes Martha to a nightclub, where the floor show includes an acrobat and a jazz singer. Judas arranges to have Martha employed by the roadhouse owner Rufus Brown, but the angel returns and advises Martha to flee. As she is escaping, a nightclub patron mistakenly believes Martha is a pickpocket who robbed him. A chase ensues and Martha races back to the Crossroads between Hell and Zion, where Satan (along with a jazz band on a flatbed truck) is waiting for her arrival. The voice of Jesus Christ challenges the mob who go away. The sign at the Crossroad is transformed into the vision of Jesus Christ being crucified, and Christ's blood drips down on Martha's face. She awakens to discover she is home and her health is restored. Martha is reunited with her husband, who has now embraced religion. The angel who took Martha on her journey returns to bless the marriage.

== Cast ==
- Cathryn Caviness as Sister Martha Ann Jackson
- Spencer Williams as Ras Jackson
- Juanita Riley as Sister Jenkins
- Reather Hardeman as Sister Ellerby
- Rogenia Goldthwaite as The Angel
- James B. Jones as Satan
- Frank H. McClennan as Judas Green
- Eddie DeBase as Rufus Brown
- Alva Fuller as Luke Williams
- Samuel Lee Ellison Jr as Gambler

== Production ==
The Blood of Jesus was the second film directed by Spencer Williams, who was one of the few African American directors active in the 1940s. The Blood of Jesus was produced in Texas on a budget of US$5,000. To present the afterlife, Williams used scenes from a 1911 Italian film called L'Inferno that depicted souls entering Heaven and in addition to Williams, the cast was made up of amateur actors and members of Reverend R. L. Robinson's Heavenly Choir, who sang the film's gospel music score.

== Music ==
The film's soundtrack includes a variety of spirituals and hymns. All songs arranged by Henry Thacker Burleigh, unless otherwise noted, and performed by R.L. Robertson and The Heavenly Choir.

- "Good News" (Traditional)
- "Go Down Moses" (Traditional)
- "Heav'n, Heav'n" (Traditional)
- "On Jordan's Stormy Banks I Stand" (Music: M. Durham; Lyrics: Samuel Stennet)
- "Amazing Grace" (Music: Traditional, arranged: William Walker; lyrics: John Newton)
- "Run, Child, Run" (Traditional spiritual)
- "Were You There (When They Crucified My Lord)" (Traditional)
- "Swing Low, Sweet Chariot" (Writer: Wallis Willis)
- "Old Time Religion" (Traditional spiritual)
- "I've Heard of a City Called Heaven" (Spiritual)
- "Weary Blues" (Music: Artie Matthews) – Gussie Smith.

== Release, reception and legacy ==
The Blood of Jesus was screened in cinemas and in black churches. The film's commercial success enabled Williams to direct and write additional feature films for Sack Amusement Enterprises, including two films with religious themes: Brother Martin: Servant of Jesus (1942) and Go Down Death (1944).

For years, The Blood of Jesus was considered a lost film until prints were discovered in the mid-1980s in a warehouse in Tyler, Texas.

Critical appraisal of The Blood of Jesus has been positive, with Dave Kehr of The New York Times calling the film “magnificent” and J. Hoberman of The Village Voice stating it is “a masterpiece of folk cinema that has scarcely lost its power to astonish.” Time magazine counted it among its “25 Most Important Films on Race.” Historian Thomas Cripps, in his book Black Film as Genre, praised The Blood of Jesus for providing “a brief anatomy of Southern Baptist folk theology by presenting Christian myth in literal terms. From its opening voiceover, the film became an advocate for the most enduring traditions of Afro-American family life on Southern ground.”

Filmmaker Julie Dash cited the baptismal sequence in The Blood of Jesus as the inspiration for a similar scene from her 1991 feature film Daughters of the Dust. In 1991, The Blood of Jesus became the first race film to be added to the U.S. National Film Registry.

It was also featured on Thom Andersen's 2015 film essay Juke: Passages from the Films of Spencer Willams.

== See also ==
- List of films in the public domain in the United States
