= Race film =

Film genre

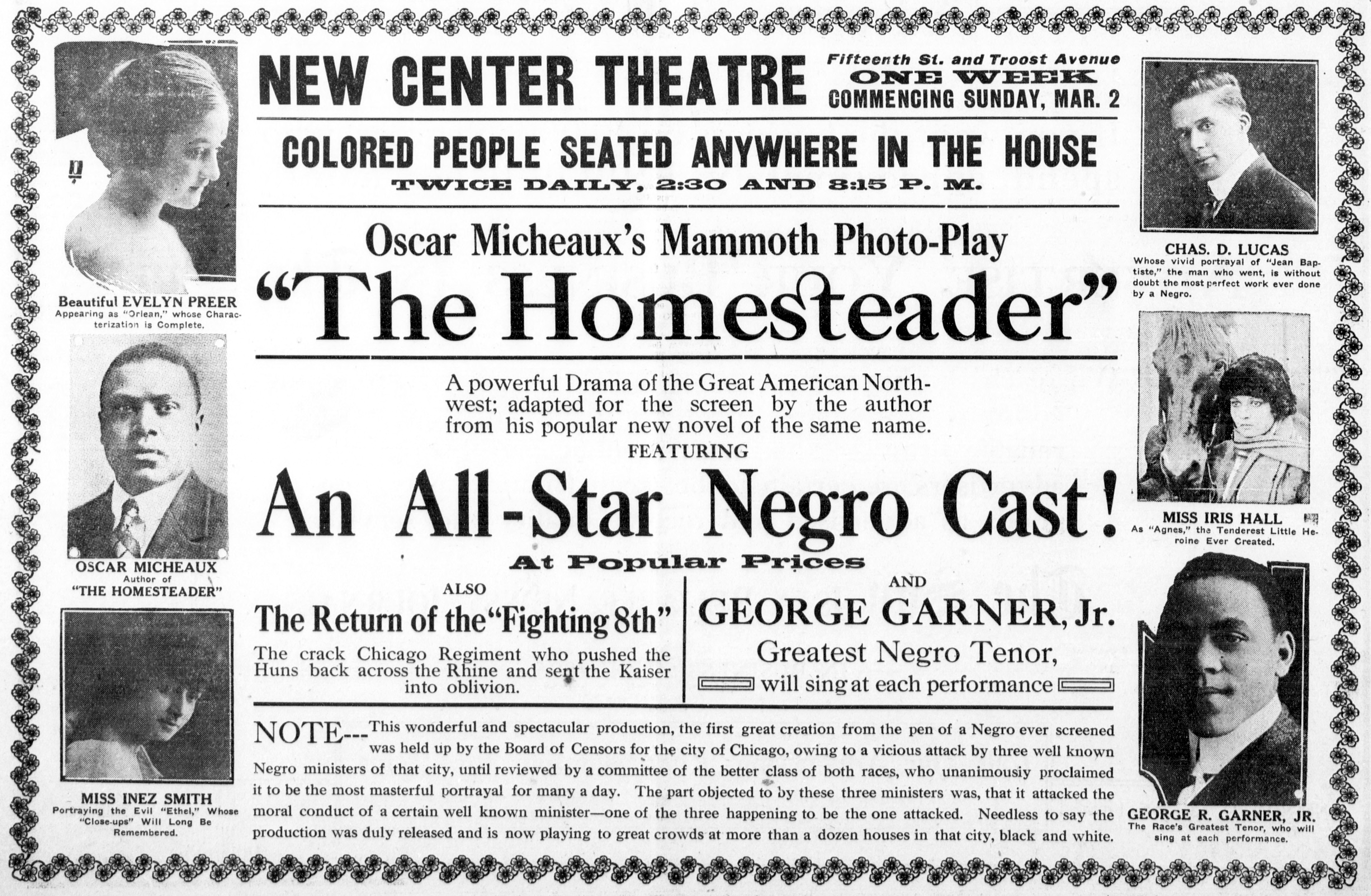
- The Homesteader (1919) by film pioneer Oscar Micheaux emphasized its black cast.
- Years active: 1915–1950s
- Location: United States
- Major figures: Zora Neale Hurston, Solomon Sir Jones, Oscar Micheaux, Paul Robeson, Tressie Souders, Lester Walton, Maria P. Williams, Spencer Williams
- Influences: Black Vaudeville
- Influenced: Chitlin' Circuit, Independent Black cinema

The race film or race movie was a genre of film produced in the United States between about 1915 and the early 1950s, consisting of films produced for black audiences, and featuring black casts. Approximately five hundred race films were produced. Of these, fewer than one hundred remain. Because race films were produced outside the Hollywood studio system, they were largely forgotten by mainstream film historians until they resurfaced in the 1980s on the BET cable network. In their day, race films were very popular among African-American theatergoers. Their influence continues to be felt in cinema and television marketed to African-Americans.

The term "race film" is sometimes used to describe films of the period aimed at other minority audiences. For instance, the 1926 film Silk Bouquet (also known as The Dragon Horse) starred the Asian-American actress Anna May Wong and was marketed to Chinese-American audiences.

== Financing and production ==
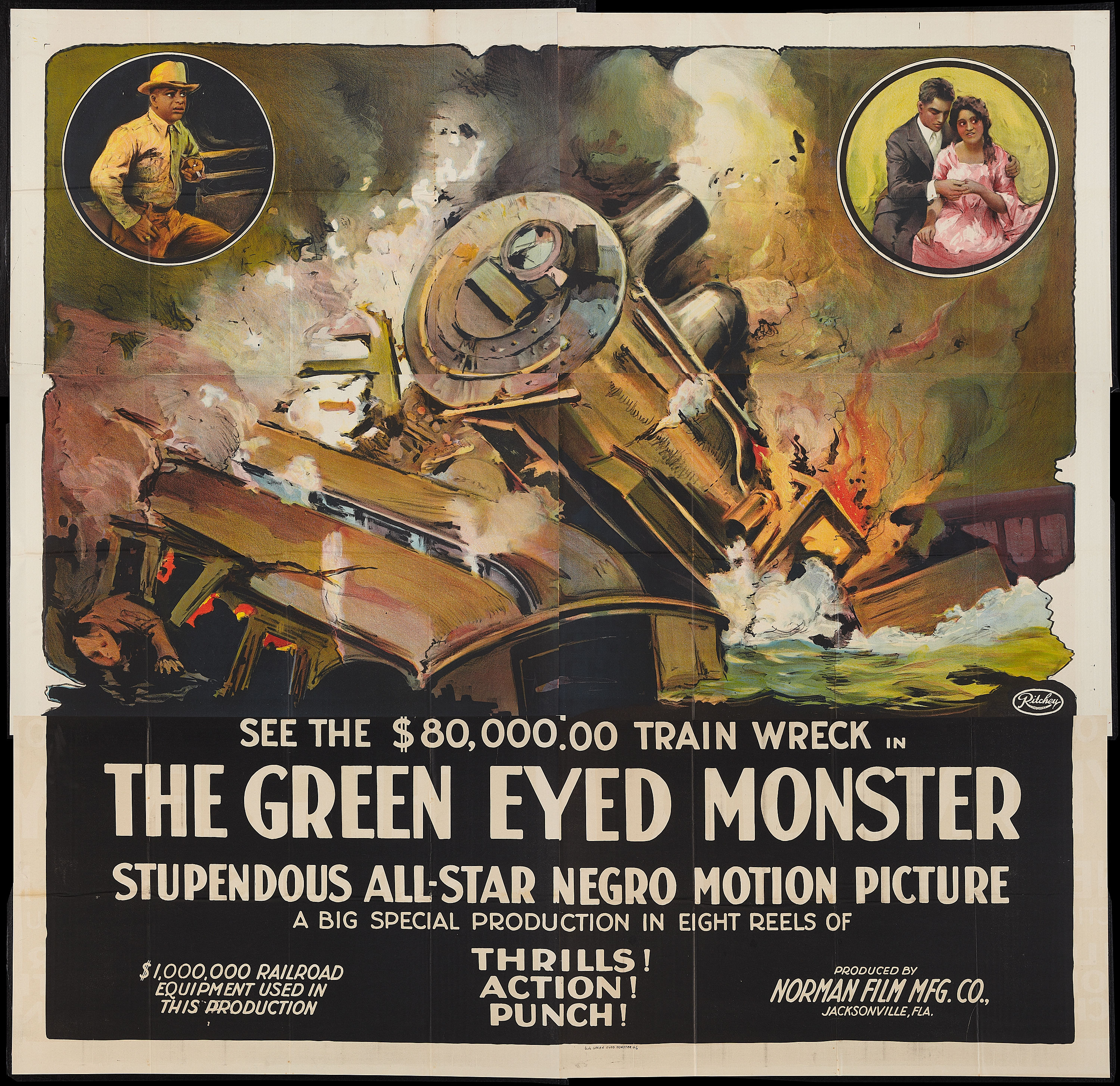
The Green Eyed Monster, an all black romantic adventure by the Norman Film Manufacturing Company with an elaborate and expensive train wreck.

African Americans produced films for black audiences as early as 1905, but most race films were produced after 1915. As many as 500 race films were produced in the United States between 1915 and 1952. As happened later with the early black sitcoms on television, race movies were most often financed by white-owned companies, such as Leo Popkin, and scripted and directed by whites. But one producer, Alfred N. Sack, made some films written and directed by black talent such as Spencer Williams. Many race films were produced by white-owned film companies outside the Hollywood-centered American film industry, such as Million Dollar Productions in the 1930s and Toddy Pictures in the 1940s. One of the earliest surviving examples of a black cast film aimed at a black audience is A Fool and His Money (1912), directed by French emigree Alice Guy for the Solax Film Company. The Ebony Film Company of Chicago, created specifically to produce black-cast films, was also headed by a white production team.

Some black-owned studios existed, including Lincoln Motion Picture Company (1916–1921). The most notable was Oscar Micheaux's Chicago-based Micheaux Film Corporation, which operated from 1918 to 1940. On his posters, Micheaux advertised that his films were scripted and produced exclusively by African Americans. Astor Pictures also released several race films and produced Beware with Louis Jordan. In total, there were approximately 150 independent companies producing race movies during this period.

The race films vanished during the early 1950s after African-American participation in World War II contributed to the starring of black actors in lead roles in several Hollywood major productions. Many of these focused on the serious problems of integration and racism, such as Pinky with Ethel Waters; Home of the Brave with James Edwards; and Intruder in the Dust with Juano Hernandez, all in 1949; and No Way Out (1950), which was the debut of the notable actor Sidney Poitier. The last known race film appears to have been an obscure adventure film of 1954 called Carib Gold.

== Venues ==
In the South, to comply with laws on racial segregation, race movies were screened at designated black theaters. Though northern cities were not always formally segregated, race films were generally shown in theaters in black neighborhoods. Many large northern theaters segregated black audiences by requiring them to sit in the balconies or to attend later showtimes.

While it was rare for race films to be shown to white audiences, white theaters often reserved special time-slots for black moviegoers. This resulted in race films often being screened as matinées and midnight shows. During the height of their popularity, race films were shown in as many as 1,100 theaters around the country.

== Themes ==
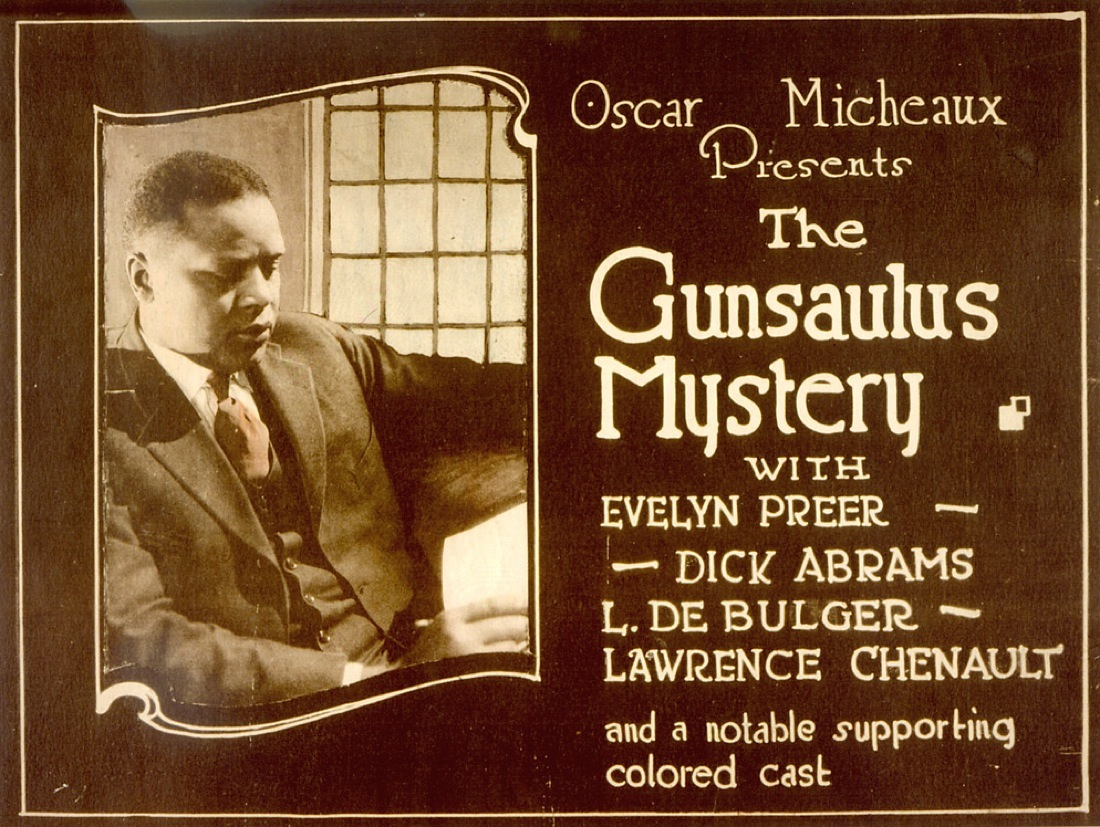
Lobby card for The Gunsaulus Mystery (1921)

The films were produced primarily in northern cities, where the target audience consisted primarily of poor southern blacks and southerners who had migrated northward. Many race films, particularly those produced by white studios, expressed middle-class urban values, especially education and industriousness. Common themes included the "improvement" of the black race, the tension between educated and uneducated blacks, and the tragic consequences in store for blacks who resisted liberal capitalist values. The most famous race movie, The Scar of Shame, incorporated all of these themes.

Race films typically avoided explicit depictions of poverty, ghettos, social decay, and crime. When such elements appeared, they often did so in the background or as plot devices. Race films rarely treated the subjects of social injustice and race relations, although blacks had been legally disenfranchised in the South since the turn of the century, and suffered discrimination in both the North and South.

According to film historian Donald Bogle, some of the earliest race films were "quite frankly, terrible". Spying Like the Spy (1917) was an example of a film produced by a white-owned company that was "almost as stereotypical as any Hollywood product".

Other race films avoided many of the popular black stock characters found in contemporary mainstream films, or else relegated these stereotypes to supporting roles and villains. Micheaux depicted his protagonists as educated, prosperous, and genteel. Micheaux hoped to give his audience something to help them "further the race".

Black comedians such as Mantan Moreland, who had played supporting comedy roles in mainstream Hollywood films, reprised his character as the lead in such films as Professor Creeps and Mr Washington Goes To Town. Some black entertainers, such as Moms Mabley or Pigmeat Markham, starred in their own vehicles. Mabley and Markham did not appear in mainstream entertainment until the late 1960s, when both were featured on Laugh-In on American television.

Many black singers and bands appeared in lead or supporting roles in race films; Louis Jordan, for example, made three films.

== Historical significance ==
Race films are of great interest to students of African-American cinema. They are historically significant due to their ability to showcase the talents of actors who otherwise were relegated to stereotypical supporting roles in mainstream studio films. Hattie McDaniel and Clarence Muse are two of the most striking examples of talented performers who generally were given minor roles in mainstream film. A few stars from race films were able to cross over to relative stardom in mainstream works – for example, Paul Robeson and Evelyn Preer. Hollywood studios often used race movies as a recruiting source of black talent.

== Notable race films ==
- The Colored American Winning His Suit (1916), first five-reel drama race film, according to The New York Age, lost
- The Homesteader (1919), lost
- The Green Eyed Monster (1919), lost
- Within Our Gates (1920), first surviving race film
- The Symbol of the Unconquered (1920)
- Body and Soul (1925), Paul Robeson's cinematic debut
- The Flying Ace (1926)
- Ten Nights in a Barroom (1926)
- The Exile (1931)
- The Emperor Jones (1933)
- The Green Pastures (1936)
- Harlem on the Prairie (1937), Herb Jeffries in the first singing cowboy Western race movie
- Harlem Rides the Range (1939)
- Lying Lips (1939)
- The Blood of Jesus (1941), first race film added to the U.S. National Film Registry, in 1991
- Brother Martin: Servant of Jesus (1942), lost
- Cabin in the Sky (1943), Vincente Minnelli's first film
- Stormy Weather (1943)
- Go Down, Death! (1944)
- Dirty Gertie from Harlem U.S.A. (1946)
- Boy! What a Girl! (1947)
- Hi-De-Ho (1947)
- Sepia Cinderella (1947)
- The Betrayal (1948), lost
- Bright Road (1953), first feature-film appearance by Harry Belafonte
- Carmen Jones (1954)
- Carib Gold (1956), final race film

== See also ==
- Blaxploitation
- Race record
- Black film
