= WWII propaganda in the southern United States =

WWII propaganda in the southern United States was a complex interplay of wartime messages and regional racial dynamics. As the United States government disseminated information to bolster the war effort against the Axis Powers, the unique social landscape of the American South led to distinct consequences. The propaganda campaigns not only fueled nationalism but also catalyzed social changes, contributing to racial tensions and laying the groundwork for future civil rights movements.

== Race and propaganda ==
=== Southern propaganda and the Japanese ===
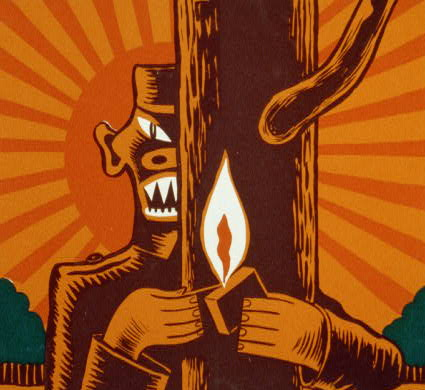
Stylized Japanese soldier, meant to appear ape-like

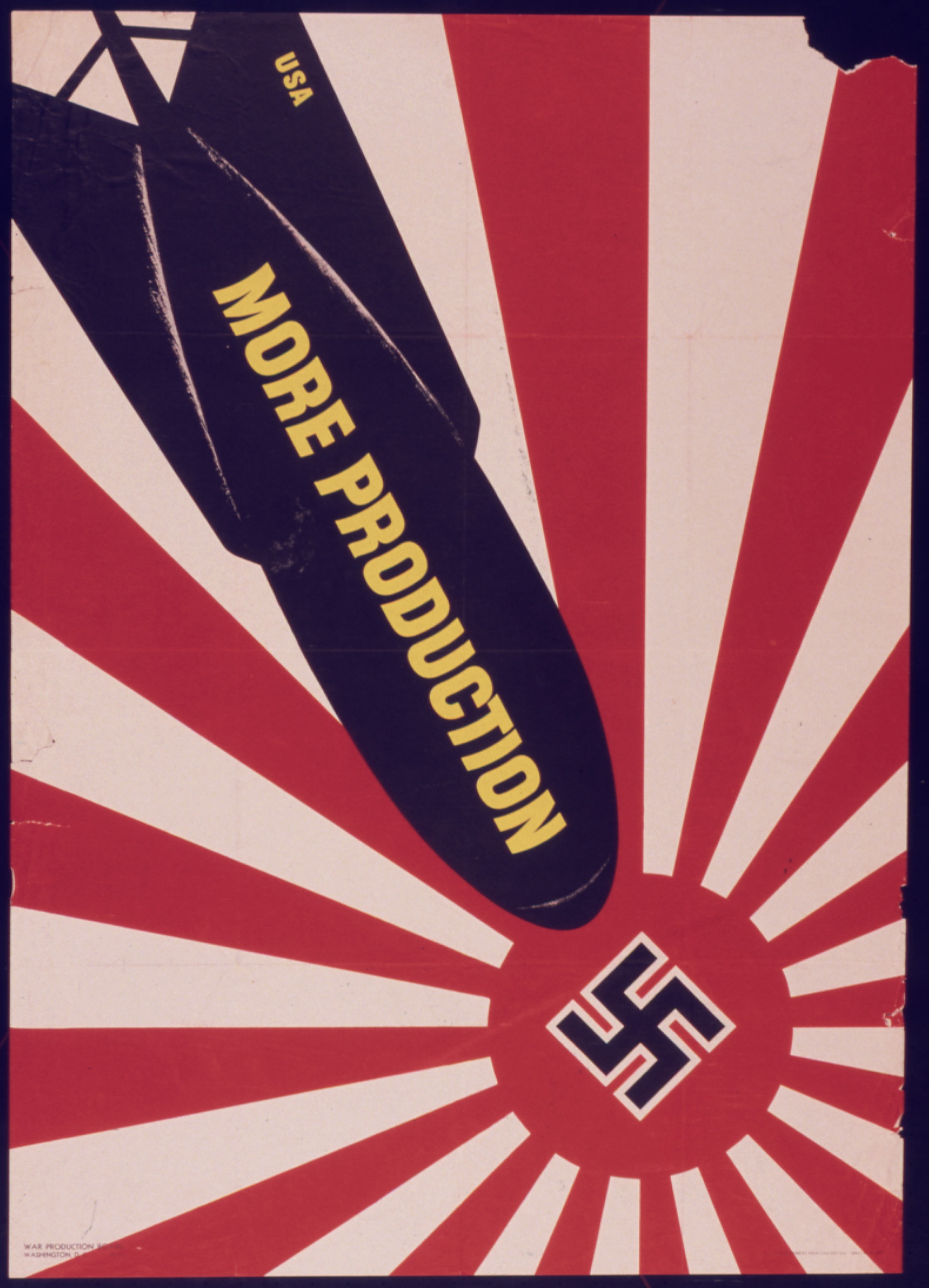
Japanese symbolism being overshadowed and defeated by American production

After Japan's Attack on Pearl Harbor, the United States entered World War II. Crucial to the United States propaganda plan was to ensure that this attack was broadcast by any and all means. Japan was the enemy. Much of the propaganda was nationalistic, instilling a sense of patriotism and national pride, however, there was a significant amount of propaganda dedicated to dehumanizing Japanese people. They were painted as savages. They were said to not value life like white men. They sought for death. The Japanese were shown as almost ape like. This played off previously established racial imagery, originally used to depict the superiority of white people over black people. This imagery was especially well-established in the south, where scientific racism had “proven” the superiority and inferiority of various races. The Office of War Information took advantage of this system to provoke anti-Japanese sentiment, particularly in the American south. Posters depicted Japanese symbolism, such as the sun seen on the Japanese flag, being overshadowed by American industrialism and military prowess. The men on the posters are seen as muscular and powerful, easily overcoming the Japanese threat. Meanwhile, the Japanese were depicted as degenerate, sexually abusive, and a threat to American women.

This anti-Japanese propaganda led to massive social disruption in the south as thousands of Japanese Americans either enlisted in the United States military or were sent to internment camps. This led to a significant migration of Japanese people to the south in the early 1940s. Jim Crow segregation was in full effect, and this introduction of an additional race completely upset the status quo. Japanese Americans did not know how to participate in an area that was segregated into white and black, and generally chose utilities assigned to white people. Yet the threat of the Japanese military and the constant bombardment of anti-Japanese propaganda led to an obvious discrepancy. Because Japanese Americans did not fit into the black/white dichotomy of Jim Crow and were advertised against using imagery that was previously assigned to subjugate black people, the racial hierarchy of the South came under heavy threat.

White supremacy was further disrupted when the American-born children of Japanese immigrants began seeking to join the army in larger numbers. Wartime propaganda promoting the war as an opportunity to fight for racial equality and racial freedom was especially effective for minorities. From the start of WWII, there was a constant flow of propaganda that pushed against Jim Crow laws and showed the war as a way for black people to end segregation. To maintain a sense of white superiority, much of that segregation was pushed onto the Japanese. There were Jim-Crow-esque laws enacted, internment camps made, and a general distaste toward Japanese people. However, in 1943 and well into 1945, the south saw an increase in propaganda that pushed for the American-born children of Japanese immigrants to enter the war so that they, too, could overcome oppression. Jim-Crow laws were overwhelmingly painted as intolerant, violent and contrarian to American values. One internment camp newspaper wrote “No American of Japanese ancestry wants to give his life for the preservation of Jap Crowism.” Propaganda in the south completely and repeatedly reshaped southern views of the Japanese.

=== Southern propaganda and black people ===
The New Deal was made to help the United States get out of the Great Depression, though many of the policies enabled racial discrimination, and did not help eliminate the effects of the Depression. The New Deal furthered racial tensions and opened the door for foreign appeals to minorities in the United States. Japanese propaganda, for instance, indicated a war against white people. They depicted white Americans as lazy, oppressive, and lacking in moral fortitude, an appealing message to southern black people. Soon it was not merely that southern blacks were hesitant to fight but a small portion actively supported the Japanese cause.

In response to this newfangled threat, the Office of War Information, and other wartime propagandists changed their emphasis. The war was painted as a way to overcome racism. German fascism was not merely a threat to American democracy; it was a threat to black people specifically. Nazis were not just oppressive to Jews and were not just an empirical force in Europe; they were a force that must be stopped because they furthered the idea that one race is scientifically superior to another. The Office of War Information began appealing to the idea that white society could be changed through the war, and that racism could be taken on at the same times the Axis Powers were taken on.

To illustrate the potential to fight the Axis Powers and racism, the imagery of the Double V was adopted by black propagandists. It represented victory in the war, and victory over Jim Crow laws, and racial oppression. This rhetoric was not without its critics. It represented a disruption of the status quo. Black propaganda was a means to ensure black rights. The propaganda helped black people feel that they were a valued part of the United States. To help black people fight in the war, propagandists realized they had to feel that they were fighting for their own country. To do that, southern blacks had to believe their country could be changed, though much of the effect of the war at home was left unaddressed through to the end of the war, partially because it was far too much to undertake while fighting in World War II.

The Double V propaganda was notably successful, and thousands of black people began joining the army. Southern plantation owners were losing significant portions of their labor force, and issue that needed to be addressed for two reasons. One, to stifle social tensions, and two, a dwindling labor force would result in lower production and economic decline in the south. Southern plantations were encouraged to shift to a mechanized system, but until that system could be implemented, much of the lost labor force was replaced by prisoners of war. Between Dallas Texas and Louisiana alone, there were over 22,000 prisoners of war working in agriculture during World War II. Propaganda aimed at southern blacks caused a deficit of labor, which led to a mass employment of prisoners of war.

Throughout the war, the constant messages of liberty, freedom, and improvement of racial equality pushed many toward assertive and even violent domestic action. There were riots against discrimination and riots to maintain discrimination. Dozens of lynchings were held in secret. In an attempt to subdue some of the chaos, local and state leaders blamed federal involvement and the New Deal. Propaganda for southern blacks inspired the beginnings of the 1960s civil rights movements against Jim Crow laws, while creating tense racial friction that did not easily subside.

== Filmic propaganda ==
The United States Film Industry produced hundreds of movies regarding WWII during the War. Forty-six of them showed actual combat, the rest of them dealt with the War’s more overarching ideas. Generally, these films were made to promote a certain aspect of the war efforts in order to garner support from the American Public. The Office of War Information regularly funded movies that encouraged people to enlist, to buy war bonds, etc. Roosevelt hired Frank Capra to head a project called “Why We Fight.” The films were not meant to be propagandist to the American public, as much as they were made as propagandizing documentaries to instruct and orient American soldiers during the war. A select few movies were produced before the bombing of Pearl Harbor, but that event triggered the production of a nearly unending stream of propagandist movies, as US involvement in the War became a nearly universally accepted course of action. Film after film was produced, supporting the war efforts. These films continued to entertain, but they also were a moral center and a source of inspiration for the American public.

In the South, the Office of War Information sought to use films to motivate black people to participate in the war effort. One of the first movies which they pushed for was titled The Man on America’s Conscience. It was a film which was supposed to depict the American man and his need for redress. Many were led to believe that the “man” who was in question would be black people. Instead, it was President Andrew Johnson. Southern Blacks were incensed. They pushed back against this movie with a great amount of aggression, leading the Office of War Information to urge MGM, the production company, to ease off on its aggressive use of racial stereotypes and the obvious white supremacy which was portrayed in the film. This event marked the first shift towards the humanizing and equalization of black people in Hollywood productions and it was also a major influence in film propaganda which targeted southern blacks.

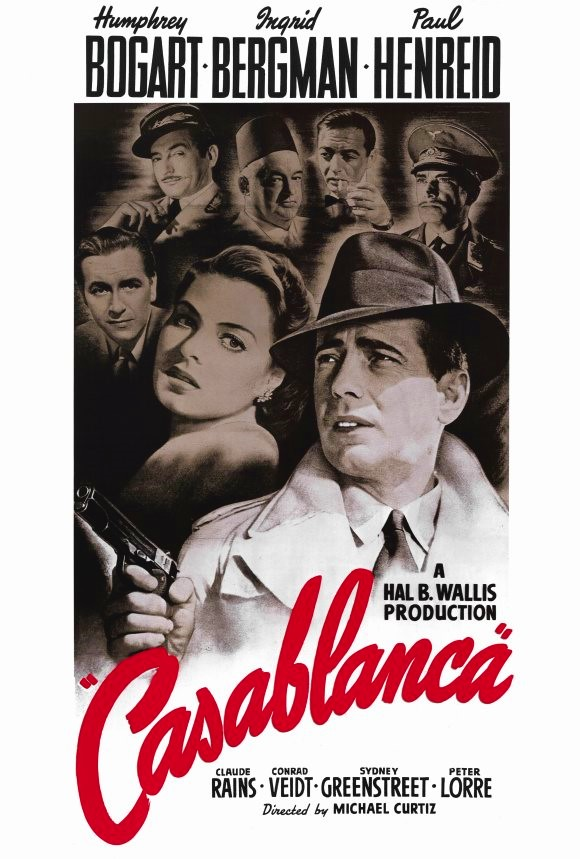
Poster for the movie Casablanca

Dozens of movies which featured black people were released in the three to four years which followed the release of "The Man on America's Conscience". Two of the most notable movies were Cabin in the Sky and Stormy Weather. Both movies were musicals that featured black musicians and entertainers. However, those entertainers were forced to exaggerate their performances in order to match the exiting stereotypes. These movies solidified black entertainers in the film industry, but they also helped to paint a clear picture of racial inequality. While it enabled black people to feel that they were a part of the nation, and while it also motivated them to fight in the war, it also agitated the still-existing racial tensions. The most famous movie released in this time is Casablanca, which features black actor Dooley Wilson playing Sam. His character is, at least to some degree, socially equal to that of Humphrey Bogart, and was a true demonstration of the power of filmic propaganda. The Office of War Information was ecstatic about the effect that this movie had on the southern states and the American film industry. Blacks were no longer depicted as silly caricatures. They were an integral part of American society and therefore, they were motivated to participate in the war effort. The south saw a massive movement of black soldiers, and an increase in latent racial tension due to the influence of the Office of War Information on the film industry.

== Government organizations ==
During their time in office President Truman and President Roosevelt put together several organizations to help fund the war efforts, mostly through propaganda. Different government agencies like the CIA also had a big role to play in this effort. Mostly affecting the interaction between the Federal Government and the citizens of this country. During this period of time Soviet embrace of communism was a big threat to the U.S. and its democratic government. President Truman pushed journalists and reporters to paint the United States on a moral and ideological high ground as compared to the Soviet Union. The War Advertising Council (WAC) was one of these organizations created in order to promote the war by using different forms of advertisement, mostly propaganda. This organization targeted minority groups that were still in the U.S. working to provide for their family, like women and men who didn't go to the war. The WAC relied on rhetorical norms in order to have patriarchal control in the face of wartime. This group had control of patriarchal advertising in the United States during WWII. Through their work, they were able to analyze and control the outcome that propaganda played in the U.S. and how it affected its citizens.

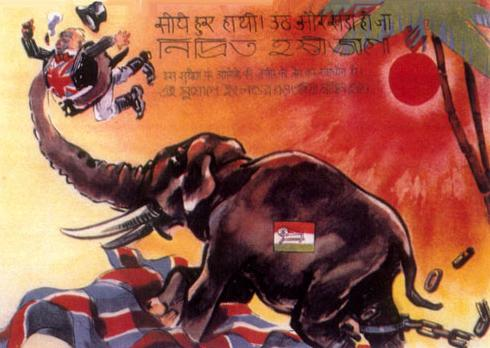
This is one example of propaganda that was used in order to promote hatred for Japanese soldiers.

During WWII there was an advancement of urbanization and industrialization with unprecedented speed. With this new advancement in society came new employment, a new agricultural structure, urbanization, and a civil rights movement. It was a belief in the South that urbanization would bring an end to family values; and with the increase in population in big cities, the Federal Government was forced to increase its presence and influence. This resulted in the South being upset by the increasing racial tensions because of federal segregation law, which would eventually bring about the civil rights movement in 1964. This would shift the effect that southern states viewed and received propaganda.
