= Creighton Thompson =

American baritone (1889–1969)

- Born: Charles Creighton Thompson; 1889
- Died: 1969 (aged 79–80)
- Occupations: Baritone; actor
- Years active: 1910s–1940s
- Spouse: Hilda Offley (m. 1917; died 1968)
- Musical career
- Formerly of: Lafayette Players

Charles Creighton Thompson (1889–1969) was an American baritone who appeared in shows, recordings, and films. He performed with the Lafayette Players and toured European capital cities, but, with his orchestra, was ordered out of Berlin by Adolf Hitler's government, as "race hatred" increased there. He lived in Budapest, Hungary, and in Bombay, India, for periods. He was from a family of musicians, including his siblings, the composer James DeKoven Thompson and dance teacher Hazel Thompson.

A 1937 program for Romance: Cabaret Dancing, featuring Thompson

In 1910, he performed with L. J. Mason's Mason Jubilee Singers, and in 1912, he performed with Aida Overton Walker. In 1913, he performed at the Grand Theater in Chicago, in a performance where he was one three featured singers. He sang "The Ghost Ship" in the 1915 production Darkydom and "Milo" in a 1916 edition of Darktown Follies. In 1935, his songs were part of a radio program in Bombay that was accompanied by a photograph of him. He was also on radio in Bombay in 1936.

He portrayed a preacher in the 1946 musical St. Louis Woman, an adaptation of Arna Bontemps's 1931 novel God Sends Sunday. He sang "I Got a Marble and a Star" in the 1947 musical Street Scene written by Elmer Rice and Langston Hughes. In the same year, he was pictured in The Crisis. In 1948, he portrayed Rev. Jackson in Jack Kemp's film Miracle in Harlem.

He married the actress Hilda Offley; they were both original Lafayette Players. Their marriage lasted 51 years until her death in 1968.

== Recordings ==
- The Red Devils; "The Crocodile", "My Little Bimbo", "I'll Be Back There Someday", "If I Forget" (His Master's Voice, 1920)
- Creighton Thompson and Lieut. Jim Europe's Singing Serenaders "Exhortation (Jubilee Shout)"
- Lieut. Noble Sissle and Lieut. Jim Europe's Singing Serenaders "Little David Play on Your Harp"

== Filmography ==
- Miracle in Harlem
