= Hearts of Humanity =

Hearts of Humanity may refer to:

- Hearts of Humanity (1932 film), 1932 American drama film directed by Christy Cabanne
- Hearts of Humanity (1936 film), 1936 British drama film directed by John Baxter

== See also ==
- The Heart of Humanity, 1918 silent war propaganda film
