= Rudolph Fisher =

American physician, writer, and musician (1897–1934)

- Born: Rudolph John Chauncey Fisher; May 9, 1897; Washington, D.C., United States
- Died: December 26, 1934 (aged 37); New York City, United States
- Education: Brown University; Howard University
- Occupations: Physician; radiologist; novelist; short story writer; dramatist; musician; orator

Rudolph John Chauncey Fisher (May 9, 1897 – December 26, 1934) was an American physician, radiologist, novelist, short story writer, dramatist, musician, and orator. His father was John Wesley Fisher, a clergyman, his mother was Glendora Williamson Fisher, and he had two siblings. Fisher married Jane Ryder, a school teacher from Washington, D.C. in 1925, and they had one son, Hugh, who was born in 1926 and was also nicknamed "The New Negro" as a tribute to the Harlem renaissance. Fisher had a successful career as an innovative doctor and author, who discussed the dynamics and relationships of Black and White people living in Harlem. This racial conflict was a central theme in many of his works.

== Early life ==
Born on May 9, 1897, in Washington, D.C., Rudolph Fisher grew up in Providence, Rhode Island. He was the youngest of three children born to Reverend John Wesley Fisher, a Baptist pastor, and Glendora Williamson Fisher.

Fisher graduated from Classical High School in 1915 with honors and further went to Brown University where he studied English and biology and was elected to Phi Beta Kappa, Delta Sigma Rho, and Sigma Xi. He graduated with a Bachelor of Arts from Brown in 1919, delivered the valedictory address, and received a Master of Arts a year later.

After graduating from Brown, Fisher took part in a Manhattan-based program titled "Four Negro Commencement Speakers" where he read his Brown commencement speech, "The Emancipation of Science". At Howard Medical School, he studied radiology.

On April 14, 1923, in Manhattan, Fisher married Jane Ryder, a public school teacher, a year after meeting her. They had one child, a son, Hugh Ryder Fisher (1926–1964).

He later attended medical school at Howard University in Washington D.C, graduating with honors in 1924. Then, he came to New York City in 1925 to take up a fellowship of Physicians and Surgeons at Columbia University's college, during which time he published two scientific articles of his research on treating Bacteriophage viruses with ultraviolet light.

In addition to researching and writing in medical and literary fields, Fisher also pursued his love for jazz. He played the piano and wrote musical scores. Fisher's ability to use all of his talents simultaneously was evident during his college years. The summer after his college graduation, he and Paul Robeson toured along the East Coast as a band.

== Medical career ==
During the 1920s, Fisher published his research on the effect of ultraviolet rays on viruses in medical journals. He was a head researcher at Manhattan's International Hospital. His experience in the medical field helped him to get ideas for his writing on mystery, and it helped him to create illustrations of the human body. Fisher completed an internship at Freedman's Hospital in one year during 1925. In 1926, he and his wife moved to New York. Fisher then joined a prestigious board called the Fellow at the National Research Council of the College of Physicians and Surgeons. Fisher soon after became superintendent of the International Hospital in Harlem in 1927, and set up his private practice as a radiologist, with an X-ray laboratory of his own, in New York.

== Literary career ==
Fisher's first published short story, "City of Refuge," was published in the Atlantic Monthly of February 1925. The story brought Fisher "instant fame among the Harlem literary set because of its vividly dramatic depiction of Harlem street life as seen through the consciousness of a southern migrant." Fisher's "The South Lingers On," a set of five vignettes, followed in the March 1925 Harlem special number of Survey Graphic. Later that year, the two pieces were reprinted (with "The South Lingers On" retitled as "Vestiges: Harlem Sketches") in Alain Locke's anthology The New Negro. Fisher's first novel, The Walls of Jericho, came out in 1928. He was inspired by a friend's challenge to write this novel treating both the upper and lower classes of black Harlem equally. This novel presents a vision that African American men and women can both get ahead in life if they come together and form a bond against centuries of oppression. His second novel, The Conjure-Man Dies: A Mystery Tale of Dark Harlem (1932), was the first novel to feature a black detective and the first detective novel with only black characters. This novel was also set in Harlem. His novel was publicized by Covici-Friede, making him the second African American to write a detective novel in the United States. Fisher published a total of eighteen short stories, in journals including McClure's, American Mercury, Junior Red Cross News, The New York News, Story, The Crisis, and Opportunity. These include "High Yaller," which won the 1925 inaugural Amy Springarn short story contest in The Crisis, and his final published story, "Miss Cynthie" (1933), published in Story. Both "City of Refuge" and "Miss Cynthie" were included in the Best American Short Stories collections for the years in which they were published.

As Oliver Henry states, "Fisher writes about black people in a manner which expresses their kinship with other peoples. He underscores and highlights the fundamental human condition of black Americans. ... He captures the historically induced unique qualities of black people; but, and perhaps even more importantly, he writes of them basically as people."

== Participation in Pan-Africanism ==
Throughout his career, Fisher had an interest in Pan-Africanism, which is a movement that aims to encourage and strengthen unity of all African-Americans. It started in 1900.

Fisher supported the Pan-African Congress, whose participants promoted self-determination for colonized Africans as a necessary prerequisite for complete social, economic and political emancipation. Unlike Malcolm X, Marcus Garvey, and W.E. B. DuBois who tried to incorporate stereotypes of black exoticism into Pan-Africanism, Fisher focused on the broader struggle for black labor privilege and women's empowerment.

== Death ==
Fisher died in 1934 at the age of 37 from abdominal cancer likely caused by his own x-ray experimentation. He was buried in Woodlawn Cemetery in The Bronx, New York City.

== Principal works ==
=== "The City of Refuge" (1925) ===
Rudolph Fisher's story "The City of Refuge" is centered on a Southern black man named King Solomon Gillis and his migration to Harlem, New York from North Carolina to escape lynching. Gillis is amazed by the opportunity and freedom he sees when he first arrives in Harlem. Gillis meets a man named Uggam who helps him settle into Harlem and gets him a "job". Fisher presents the idea of a migrant's adjustment to the city during "Negro Harlem" and the race relations along the way. The story concludes with Gillis being duped by Uggam into selling "medicine" (drugs) for him, leading him to be arrested.

=== "High Yaller" (1925) ===
Story about a light-skinned woman facing difficulties of cross-identity. In the short story, the main character Evelyn Brown faces inner turmoil all her life as she is a black woman who looks white and because of her complexion she is accused of favoring fair skinned people. To combat that accusation she becomes more engaged in the Black community and begins dating a young Black man by the name of Jay Martin. Their relationship brings more problems as the public become judgemental and unpleasant at the idea of their relationship. Both black and white people assume Evelyn is a white woman and Jay is a black man and shame them for being together. Fisher uses this story to comment on societal pressure to fit into a category, and to highlight the intraracial conflict within the Black community on people who do not look conventionally Black.

=== "Ringtail" (1925) ===
This short story published in The Atlantic Monthly, has the central theme of intraracial conflict among black inhabitants in Harlem during the 1920s and 1930s. Fisher addresses how Southern blacks and Caribbean immigrant blacks treated each other during this time and the prejudice attitudes that each ethnic group internalized. He used the characters Cyril Best, a black man from the Caribbean, and Punch Anderson, from the South, in order to show the relationship between these two groups. Best is described as "superior-minded" and "self-esteemed," while Anderson is said to have "the gift of humor and laughter." Differences among the characters such as these are emphasized throughout the story.

=== "The Caucasian Storms Harlem" essay (1927) ===
“The Caucasian Storms Harlem” by Rudolph Fisher was published in 1927 in the American Mercury. This essay highlights a cultural change after the Harlem Renaissance from Fisher's point of view. Fisher returned to Harlem and was astounded by the drastic change in the cabaret night scene, what was once a Black dominated space due to segregation was now a White attraction. Fisher reflects on his early days in Harlem by detailing his experiences in popular cabarets of the times, one being “The Oriental”, in which promising jazz figures like Henry Creamer and Turner Lyton frequented before becoming prominent names in jazz. Another cabaret was Edmonds’, where Fisher details the talent of Ethel Waters and her performances of genuine blues before she became a prominent figure in blues. Fisher mentions other cabarets and the ambiance they provided for young African Americans at the time. He then explores the different reasons why Caucasians are beginning to frequent these types of establishments, one being that White people have always had a fascination with Black entertainment, the next being the people that made these scenes lively were separating and moving to different countries for better job opportunities, and finally, that White people were finally understanding the allure of Black music and culture and wanted to be a part of it.

=== The Walls of Jericho (1928) ===
The Walls of Jericho, Fisher's first novel, is about Black life in Harlem. In this novel, he addresses the conflict and distrust among the "dickties" and "rats", or upper class and lower class Blacks living in Harlem. The "dickties" main goal is to assimilate to white culture and life in order to be accepted and prosper in New York. The "rats" are distrustful of White people and "dickties", as they believe the "dickties" want to desperately be White and are going against the Black community during this process. These two groups live in completely different neighborhoods and only interact in certain social spheres, such as during the annual G.I.A Ball. Fisher also states that "rats" and "dickties" have distinct physical features as well, making them even more different from each other. "Rats" tend to be described as darker in Fisher's novel while many "dickties" have lighter skin and lighter hair. These features also contribute to the tension between the upper and lower class in The Walls of Jericho, as it is easy for "dickties" to blend into the White community.

Fisher uses the interactions of several characters in this novel to display how intense the conflict between African Americans in Harlem was. Merritt is one of these characters. He is a "dicktie" and a successful Black lawyer who is making a bold choice by moving into a White neighborhood in Harlem. Many "rats" see this as betrayal, such as the characters Jinx, Bubber, and Shine. Merritt at first is one of the kinder and more humbled "dickties", who is respectful to these three men who help him move into his new home. We see later in the novel however, that Merrit has shown contempt and hate for "rats" in the past. He threatened to sue Henry Patmore, a lower-class man, for $10,000 after he accidentally hit a pedestrian. Patmore has hated "dickties" since this interaction, so much so that he burns down Merritt's new home. Merritt's White neighbors are blamed for this crime at first, and then later Patmore is discovered as being the culprit.

=== The Conjure-Man Dies (1932) ===
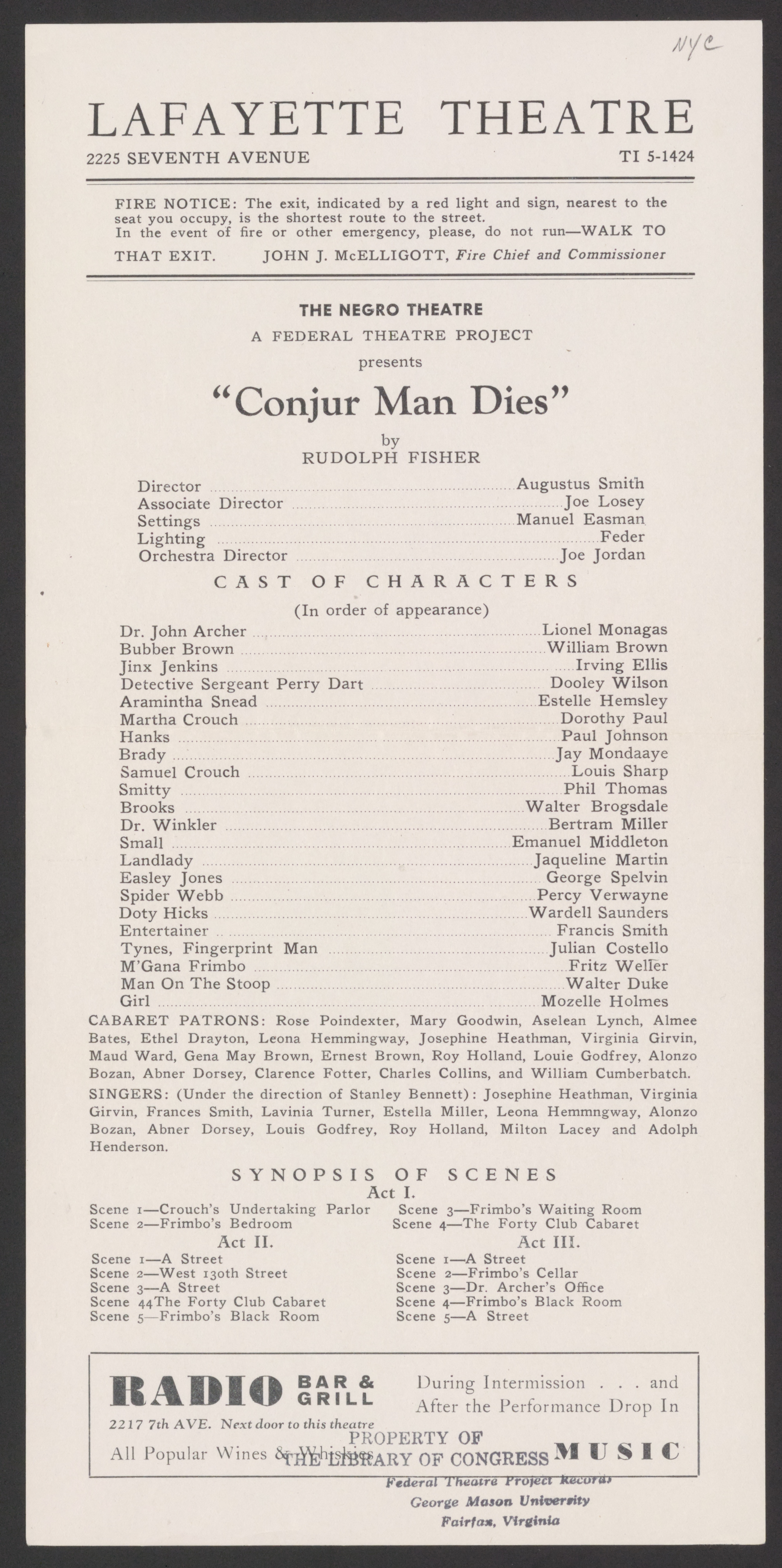
Playbill for the Federal Theatre Project production of Conjur' Man Dies (1936), starring Dooley Wilson as Dart and Lionel Monagas as Archer

The Conjure-Man Dies is Fisher's second and last novel, a murder mystery set in Harlem. Fisher incorporates mystery and slight comedy in this story. Fisher uses the stories of his characters to mirror the culture in Harlem at the time.

The plot deals with the murder of conjure-man N'Gana Frimbo, found dead by one of his clients, Jinx Jenkins. Perry Dart, a detective of the Harlem police department, and physician John Archer start to investigate. They discover Frimbo had been hit on the head with a club from his own collection of African curios and then suffocated with a handkerchief stuffed down his throat.

Dart and Archer discover Frimbo met with six other people before his death: his landlord Mrs. Crouch, Aramintha Snead, Jenkins, numbers runner Spider Webb, drug addict Doty Hicks, and railroad worker Easley Jones. Frimbo's assistant also becomes a suspect when the man disappears without a trace. Dart and Archer discover the handkerchief belonged to Jenkins and arrest him on suspicion of murder.

Frimbo is discovered alive, with no recollection of who attempted to kill him. Jenkins' friend Bubber Brown, sorry to see Jenkins behind bars, begins his own investigation. Brown discovers that Frimbo may have been targeted due to his involvement in a war between two rival numbers runners, one of whom employs Spider Webb. Brown breaks into Frimbo's home and watches Frimbo burn the remains of his assistant.

At another gathering of the suspects, Frimbo reveals the truth: Fearing reprisals from Webb's employer, he and his assistant switched places. His assistant was killed while posing as Frimbo. He cremated the assistant in accordance with an ancient African rite which has been in his family for generations. The murderer is revealed as Easley Jones, who in turn is revealed as Mrs. Crouch's husband in disguise. He had discovered his wife was having an affair with Frimbo and posed as a client in order to get Frimbo alone and kill him. Crouch stole Jenkins' handkerchief and the club while they were in the waiting room.

After Fisher's death in 1934, the novel was turned into a play in 1936. The characters of Dart and Archer reappear in the short story John Archer's Nose.

=== "Miss Cynthie" (1933) ===
"Miss Cynthie" is a short story, published in 1933 in Story Magazine. In the story, Miss Cynthie arrives in New York city from Waxhaw, South Carolina. She has come to Harlem to meet her grandson, Dave Tappen, whom she raised after his mother's death. When Miss Cynthie discovers her grandson has chosen a career in theater, she is heartbroken. One day, Dave overhears Miss Cynthie singing and leads her to a theater. Dave stands onstage next to Cynthie and sings a song that Cynthie taught him when he was a child. Miss Cynthie realizes how much her grandson adores her.

== Bibliography ==
Unless noted, Rudolph Fisher's bibliography is drawn from African American Authors, 1745–1945: Bio-bibliographical Critical Sourcebook, edited by Emmanuel Sampath Nelson.

=== Short stories ===
- "The City of Refuge". The Atlantic Monthly, February 1925.
- "The South Lingers On". Survey Graphic, March 1925. Reprinted in The New Negro: An Interpretation, 1925, as "Vestiges: Harlem Sketches."
- "Ringtail". The Atlantic Monthly, May 1925.
- "High Yaller". The Crisis, October 1925.
- "The Promised Land". The Atlantic Monthly, January 1927.
- "The Backslider". McClure's, August 1927.
- "Blades of Steel". The Atlantic Monthly, August 1927.
- "Fire by Night". McClure's, December 1927.
- "Common Meter". Baltimore Afro-American, February 1930.
- "Dust". Opportunity, February 1931.
- "Ezekiel". Junior Red Cross News, March 1932.
- "Ezekiel Learns". Junior Red Cross News, February 1933.
- "Guardian of the Law". Opportunity, March 1933.
- "Miss Cynthie". Story, June 1933.
- "John Archer's Nose". Metropolitan Magazine, January 1935. (Features characters from The Conjure Man Dies)

=== Novels ===
- The Walls of Jericho (1928)
- The Conjure Man Dies: A Mystery Tale of Dark Harlem (1932)

=== Essays ===
- "Action of Ultraviolet Light upon Bacteriophage and Filterable Viruses". Proceedings of the Society of Experimental Biology and Medicine 23. (1926).
- "The Caucasian Storms Harlem". The American Mercury 11 (1927).
- "The Resistance of Different Concentrations of a Bacteriophage of Ultraviolet Rays". Journal of Infectious Diseases 40 (1927).

=== Plays ===
- The Vici Kid.
- Golden Slippers.

== Awards ==
- 1919: Brown Beta Kappa Key
- 1919: Brown University commencement speaker
- 1924: Honors from Howard Medical School
- 1925: The Crisis Spingarn Prize
- 1927: Brown University Class Day Orator

== See also ==
- Countee Cullen
- Langston Hughes
- Zora Neale Hurston
- Wallace Thurman
