= Big White Fog =

Play written by Theodore Ward

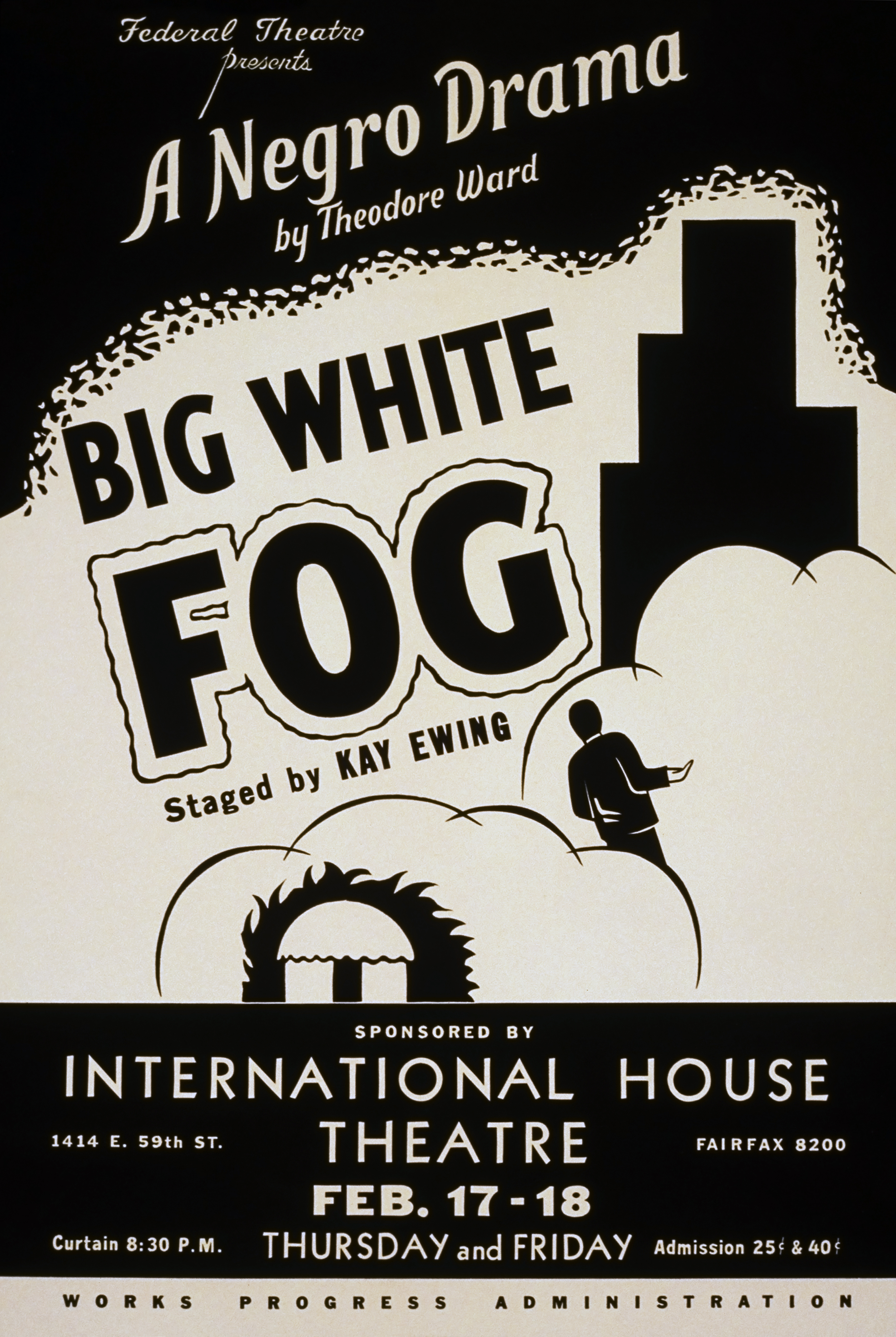
- 1938 poster
- Written by: Theodore Ward
- Original language: English
- Genre: Drama
- Setting: Chicago, Illinois

Premiere
- Date premiered: April 7, 1938
- Place premiered: Great Northern Theater, Chicago, Illinois

Big White Fog is a play by American playwright Theodore Ward and his first major work. The play follows the fictional Mason family across three generations between 1922 and 1933. Half of the family supports a return to Africa and Garveyism, while the other half of the family seeks the American Dream.

Completed in 1937, the play was first produced by the Negro Unit of the Chicago Federal Theatre Project in 1938 at the Great Northern Theatre in Chicago, Illinois. A 1940 revival of Big White Fog was the first production of the Negro Playwrights Company in New York. In 2007, Michael Attenborough directed its European premiere at the Almeida Theatre, and commissioned their resident playwright Roy Williams to write Out of the Fog, a modern look and comparison of contemporary blacks in England versus those in the 1920s in Chicago.

== Background ==
Ward was born in Louisiana in 1902, the sixth of eleven children. His father had been a slave. When Ward was seven years old, he wrote a short play and showed it to his father, who threw it in a fire and said it was "the work of the devil". Ward's mother secretly educated him until her death some time around 1915 during childbirth. His family soon after broke apart, and Ward traveled on trains heading north. He performed various odd jobs, including bell hop, shoe-shine boy and barber-shop porter. He was arrested in Salt Lake City, Utah for selling gin (which was outlawed at the time because of prohibition). There, Ward began writing again, mostly short stories and poems. In 1934, he moved to Chicago and wrote a one-act play titled Sick 'n Tiahd. The play won second place in a writing competition for a magazine, and Ward was encouraged by the winner of the competition, Richard Wright, to write a full-length play. Ward subsequently wrote Big White Fog. He went on to write more than thirty plays, including the Broadway-produced Our Lan'.

Big White Fog received a public reading in New York some time before Ward's death in 1983. For the occasion, Ward wrote about his inspiration for the play, discussing a beautiful view he had seen in the Rocky Mountains while riding on freight trains during his youth:

But suddenly I found my spirit sickened as I realised the truth: "I'm a Negro and all this beauty and majesty does not belong to me." With a fallen heart, I acknowledged that I had nothing to boast of. I was a descendant of the slaves who had built this country, yet I was still deprived of the patriotic joy felt by those who claimed the land as their own. In my bewilderment that late afternoon, it suddenly occurred to me that we as a people were engulfed by a pack of lies, surrounded, in fact, by one big white fog through which we could see no light anywhere. Disheartened, as the sun sank behind the mountains west of the pass, I crawled back into a darkened corner of the boxcar and there I lay down, convinced that my life would be that of a 'floater', sans hope, sans purpose.

== Plot ==
Big White Fog demonstrates the internal black tensions of the 1920s by following the Masons, a black family living in a rented house in Chicago. The residents consist of Victor Mason, his wife Ella, their son Lester, Victor's brother Percy, and Ella's brother-in-law Dan. Lester has received a college scholarship, Percy is returning home from military service, and Dan is a landlord. Their situation slowly spirals downward, with Lester losing his scholarship because he is black, and when the Great Depression hits, the family faces eviction. Victor, in his disillusionment, turns to Garveyism, and plans to emigrate to Africa. Lester begins to support a Communist revolution. Dan remains committed to the American Dream.

== Production ==
An original production of the Federal Theatre Project, Big White Fog was presented April 7–May 30, 1938. The production was directed by Kay Ewing, with settings by Hal Kopel.

In 1940 Ward joined Langston Hughes, Paul Robeson, Theodore Browne, Richard Wright and Alain Locke to form the Negro Playwrights Company in New York. Their first production was a revival of Big White Fog at the Lincoln Theatre in Harlem. Directed by Powell Lindsay with settings by Perry Watkins, the play opened October 22, 1940, and ran 64 performances. The cast included Canada Lee, Hilda Offley, Frank Silvera and Lionel Monagas.

The script for Big White Fog was first published in 1974 in Black Theater USA.

The play received its European premiere at the Almeida Theatre in London on May 11, 2007, directed by Michael Attenborough.

Around the time of the Almeida Theatre's European premiere of the play, they commissioned their resident playwright Roy Williams to write Out of the Fog, a modern look and comparison of contemporary blacks in England versus those in the 1920s in Chicago.

== Reception ==
The Chicago Tribune praised the original 1938 production as a skillfully performed and imaginative footnote to recent history in recording the Marcus Garvey movement that had originated in Chicago. The Herald Examiner noted that the actors "are as much at ease on the stage as in their own homes."

Reviewing the 1940 production for The New Masses, Ralph Ellison wrote that "Big White Fog is like no other Negro play. The author takes a movement which has been passed off as a ludicrous effort by Negroes to ape British royalty and reveals in it that dignity of human groping which is characteristic of all oppressed peoples."

Big White Fog has been compared by Michael Billington of The Guardian to the 1959 play A Raisin in the Sun by Lorraine Hansberry, and the 1930s drama work of Clifford Odets in terms of relating personal and social issues. Kate Bassett of The Independent on Sunday praised Ward's ability to pack a "state-of-the-nation play into one living room very deftly", and called the play a "still-reverberating portrait of racial anger". Billington said that he admired Ward's management of a large cast, but found that the climax was "both rushed and melodramatic".
