= St. Louis Woman =

1946 musical by Harold Arlen (music) and Johnny Mercer (lyrics)

- 1946 Original Cast Recording
- Music: Harold Arlen
- Lyrics: Johnny Mercer
- Book: Arna Bontemps, Countee Cullen
- Basis: Arna Bontemps' novel God Sends Sunday
- Productions: 1946 Broadway

St. Louis Woman is a 1946 American musical by Arna Bontemps and Countee Cullen with music by Harold Arlen and lyrics by Johnny Mercer. The musical opened at the Martin Beck Theatre in New York on March 30, 1946, and ran for 113 performances. The original cast included Robert Pope (Badfoot), Harold Nicholas (Little Augie), Fayard Nicholas (Barney), June Hawkins (Lilli), Pearl Bailey (Butterfly), Ruby Hill (Della Green), Rex Ingram (Biglow Brown), and Milton J. Williams (Mississippi). The production's scenic designer and costume designer was Lemuel Ayers. It is based upon the novel God Sends Sunday by African-American writer Arna Bontemps.

== Background ==
The idea for the St. Louis Woman musical was developed by Hollywood producer Ed Gross, who wanted to create a musical based upon Arna Bontemps' novel God Sends Sunday. The novel had already been adapted into a straight theatrical stage play by Bontemps and poet Countee Cullen in the early 1930s. Gross wanted a musical for the talents of Lena Horne and thought that a musical version of Bontemps' novel would be a powerful vehicle for her. He approached Cullen to write the book and Arlen and Mercer to write the music for the project. All of them accepted.

Although Arlen and Mercer created what some consider to be their best score, the musical suffered from many misfortunes during production. First, the book suffered several serious problems. The show was not really a comedy and did not lend itself to standard Broadway musical treatment of its themes. Throughout the drama, any happiness the characters attain is offset by the deepest feeling of gloom. The correct balance for a musical comedy was never achieved, and a book that could have become an opera was treated neither humorously nor dramatically. These problems were compounded by the fact that Cullen died before rehearsals even began, and Ayers and Rouben Mamoulian, who came in after to work on the show's narrative, could not fix the show's sprawling plot. Secondly, the NAACP criticised the musical for "offering roles that detract from the dignity of our race". Lena Horne agreed with this assessment and refused to star in the show saying she had no intention of portraying "a flashy lady of easy virtue". When the show eventually opened there were several protests by African Americans outside the theatre, which negatively affected sales. Finally, the show suffered several staffing problems. The choreographer was replaced midway through production and the show's leading lady, Ruby Hill, was replaced after its pre-Broadway tryout in Boston. Hill returned to the show after only three performances in New York at the insistence of the show's cast, in particular Pearl Bailey. The show opened at the Martin Beck Theater on March 30, 1946, and lasted for only 113 performances.

== Synopsis ==
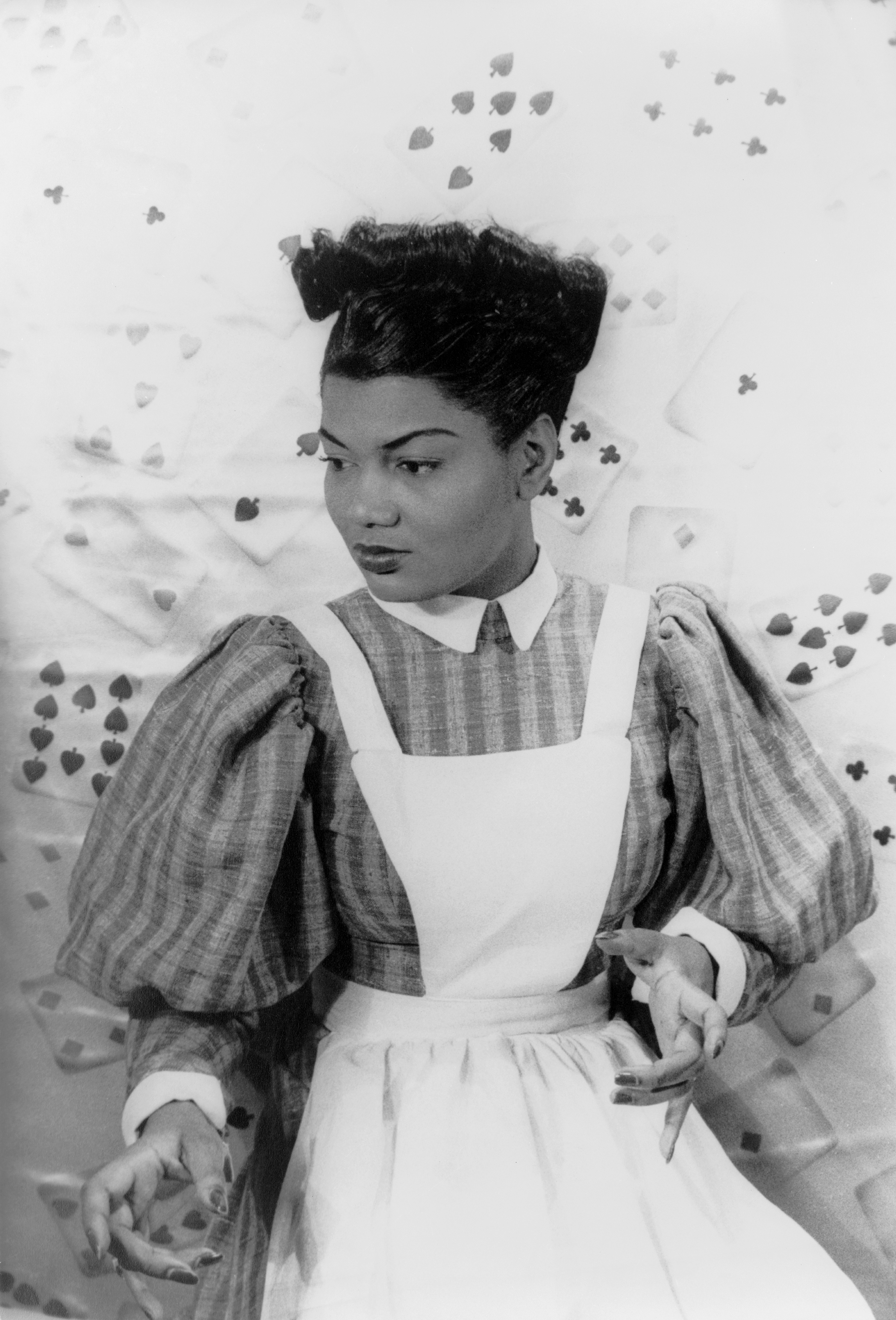
Pearl Bailey in the role of Butterfly, July 5, 1946

The story is set in St. Louis in 1898. Little Augie, a jockey who is on a winning streak, is enamoured of Della Green, the belle of St Louis. Della, however, is the girlfriend of Biglow Brown, the proprietor of the local bar. Biglow is abusive toward Della and she decides to leave him. Brown's previous mistress, Lila, is still around which produces complications. And then there is the barmaid, Butterfly. She is in love with Barney, another jockey, but unlike Little Augie, Barney is older and not that lucky. But Butterfly doesn't want things to go too far with Barney until she gets that elusive wedding ring.

It's cakewalking time and Augie attracts the attention and admiration of Della with his virtuoso performance of the cakewalk. Things go so well between them that they agree to set up home together and prepare plans to marry. But, things are not destined to go smoothly. While Augie is off at the racetrack, Della gets an unwelcome visit from Biglow Brown. When she refuses to have anything more to do with him he beats her. It is at this point that Lila enters and begs Biglow to take her back. Augie returns and a shot is fired. Brown believing he has been shot by Augie swears a curse on him although it was, in fact, Lila who fired the gun.

Although Augie is suspected by everyone that he killed Biglow Brown, it is at Brown's funeral that Lila confesses. However, the curse cast by Brown seems to be working. Augie's horses are no longer winning and Della blames herself for all the problems that have overcome them. She leaves, pretending that she wants a better life than that which can now be provided by Augie.

Della's new friend, the new bar-owner, nonetheless tells Augie of Della's true feelings.

Augie believes the curse to be so much mumbo-jumbo. He'll win his next race and he and Della can get back together again. He does - and they do!

== Scenes and settings ==
- Act 1
  - Scene I : A stable, early afternoon of a day in August.
  - Scene 2: Biglow's bar, late afternoon, the same day.
  - Scene 3: Outside Barney's room, at twilight.
  - Scene 4: A ballroom, evening of the same day.
- Act 2
  - Scene 1: Augie's and Della's home, late afternoon, the following week.
  - Scene 2: The alley.
  - Scene 3: Funeral Parlour.
- Act 3
  - Scene 1: Augie's and Della's home, early evening.
  - Scene 2: The alley.
  - Scene 3: The bar.
  - Scene 4: The stable.
  - Scene 5: Street corner close to the race track.

== Original Broadway cast ==
- Badfoot: Robert Pope
- Little Augie: Harold Nicholas
- Barney: Fayard Nicholas
- Lila: June Hawkins
- Slim: Louis Sharp
- Butterfly: Pearl Bailey
- Della Green: Ruby Hill
- Biglow Brown: Rex Ingram
- Ragsdale: Elwood Smith
- Pembroke: Merritt Smith
- Jasper: Charles Welch
- The Hostess: Maude Russell
- Drum Major: J. Mardo Brown
- Mississippi: Milton J. Williams
- Dandy Dave: Frank Green
- Leah: Juanita Hall
- Jackie: Joseph Eady
- Celestine: Yvonne Coleman
- Piggie: Herbert Coleman
- Joshua: Lorenzo Fuller
- Mr. Hopkins: Milton Wood (actor)
- Preacher: Creighton Thompson
- Waiter: Carrington Lewis

== Musical numbers ==
Act I

- "L'il Augie is a Natural Man" - Badfoot
- "Any Place I Hang My Hat is Home" - Della Green and Ensemble
- "I Feel My Luck Comin' Down" - Little Augie
- "I Had Myself a True Love" - Lila
- "Legalize My Name" - Butterfly
- "Cakewalk Your Lady" - Badfoot, Mississippi, and Ensemble

Act II

- "Come Rain Or Come Shine" - Della Green and Little Augie
- "Chinquapin Bush" - Children
- "We Shall Meet To Part, No Never" - Piggie
- "Lullaby - Della Green
- "Sleep Peaceful, Mr. Used-To-Be" - Lila
- "Funeral Scene/Leavin' Time" - Ensemble

Act III

- "I Wonder What Became Of Me" - Della Green
- "A Woman's Prerogative" - Butterfly
- "Ridin' On The Moon" - Little Augie
- "Least That's My Opinion" - Badfoot
- "Racin' Form" - Leah
- "Come On, Little Augie" - Ensemble
- "Finale" ("Come Rain Or Come Shine") - Entire Company
