= Ruble Blakey =

American singer (1911–1912)

- Born: Ruble Maxwell Blakey; April 4, 1911; Bowling Green, Kentucky, U.S.
- Died: May 13, 1992 (aged 81); Oak Bluffs, Massachusetts, U.S.
- Other names: Rubel Blakey, Skid Blakey
- Occupations: Vocalist, emcee, actor, dancer, radio announcer
- Style: Jazz music, swing music
- Spouse: Merle Laviscount Jones (m. 1949)
- Children: 1, Marla Blakey

Ruble Maxwell Blakey (April 4, 1911 – May 13, 1992) was an American singer, emcee, dancer, and actor. He appeared in two films, and was part of several albums. He was known for jazz and swing music in the 1930s and 1940s.

== Early life ==
Ruble Blakey was born on April 4, 1911, in Bowling Green, Kentucky. He was the son of Mrs. Sadie Blakey, and was raised in Chicago, Illinois. In childhood he was a chorus member.

== Career ==
Blakey started his career in the 1930s as a dancer in a Chicago cabaret. In 1932, he was part of the touring Harlem Revue with Jojo Wicks. In the late 1930s he toured the Southern circuit as a singer and emcee. Blakey was the emcee for the Swingland Chicago Revue at Swingland Cafe in 1938 when they released the "Doing the Ducky Wucky" musical dance.

He worked in 1939 as the emcee at the new Moonglow Night Club in Baltimore. He then had several gigs in Chicago's Ritz Lounge, which was owned by one of his cousins. In 1940, he worked at Joe Glaser's famous Grand Terrace Cafe (also known as Sunset Cafe) in Chicago.

Between 1941 and 1945, he was a vocalist with Lionel Hampton and his orchestra and created a number of records with Victor and Decca. In 1946, he recorded on the HUB Records label with Don Byas and his orchestra; and served as the band for the Atlantic City Follies at the Apollo Theatre.

He also worked as a radio announcer on WIND (AM) in Chicago.

== Personal life ==
Blakey had one child, daughter Marla Blakey (born April 26, 1949), a noted choreographer and dancer). In the 1950s, he relocated to Paris, living there for a few years and working as a talent agent for several jazz musicians. He then returned sometime after back to the United States.

He died on May 13, 1992, in Oak Bluffs, Massachusetts, at the age of 81. He was cremated, and his ashes were scattered in Paris.

== Discography ==
=== Singles ===
- Prove It By The Things You Do / I Made a Promise To My Heart, (HUB Records) with the Debutantes
- Gypsy Eyes, with Don Swan and His Music
- The Gypsy (1946) with Don Byas and his orchestra, vocals
- Nancy (1946) with Don Byas and his orchestra

=== With Lionel Hampton and his orchestra ===
- Now That You're Mine (1941, Victor), vocals
- Just For You (1941, Decca), vocals
- Southern Echoes / My Wish (1941, Decca), vocals
- Now I Know (1941, Decca), vocals
- Half a Love Is Better Than None (1941, Decca), vocals
- The Music Stopped (1944)
- Your Guess Is As Good As Mine (c. 1944), lyrics
- What's Happenin', Baby?, lyrics
- Give Me Some Skin
- Idaho
- Don't Believe Everything You Dream

== Filmography ==
- Sepia Cinderella (1947)
- Miracle in Harlem (1948)
