= Mae Johnson =

American performer

Mae Johnson (September 13, 1917 - March 29, 1999) was a singer and dancer who performed in several American films.

She had a leading role in the 1939 film Keep Punching and appears on a lobby card promoting the film. She was also in the 1943 film Stormy Weather performing the song "I Lost My Sugar in Salt Lake City".

She was billed as a sepia Mae West for a show at the Apollo Theater and was also referred to as Harlem's Mae West. She married "Buck" West in June 1942.

== Filmography ==
- Keep Punching (1939)
- Stormy Weather (1943)
- Thank Your Lucky Stars (1943)
- Hers to Hold (1943)
