= Lionel Monagas =

American actor

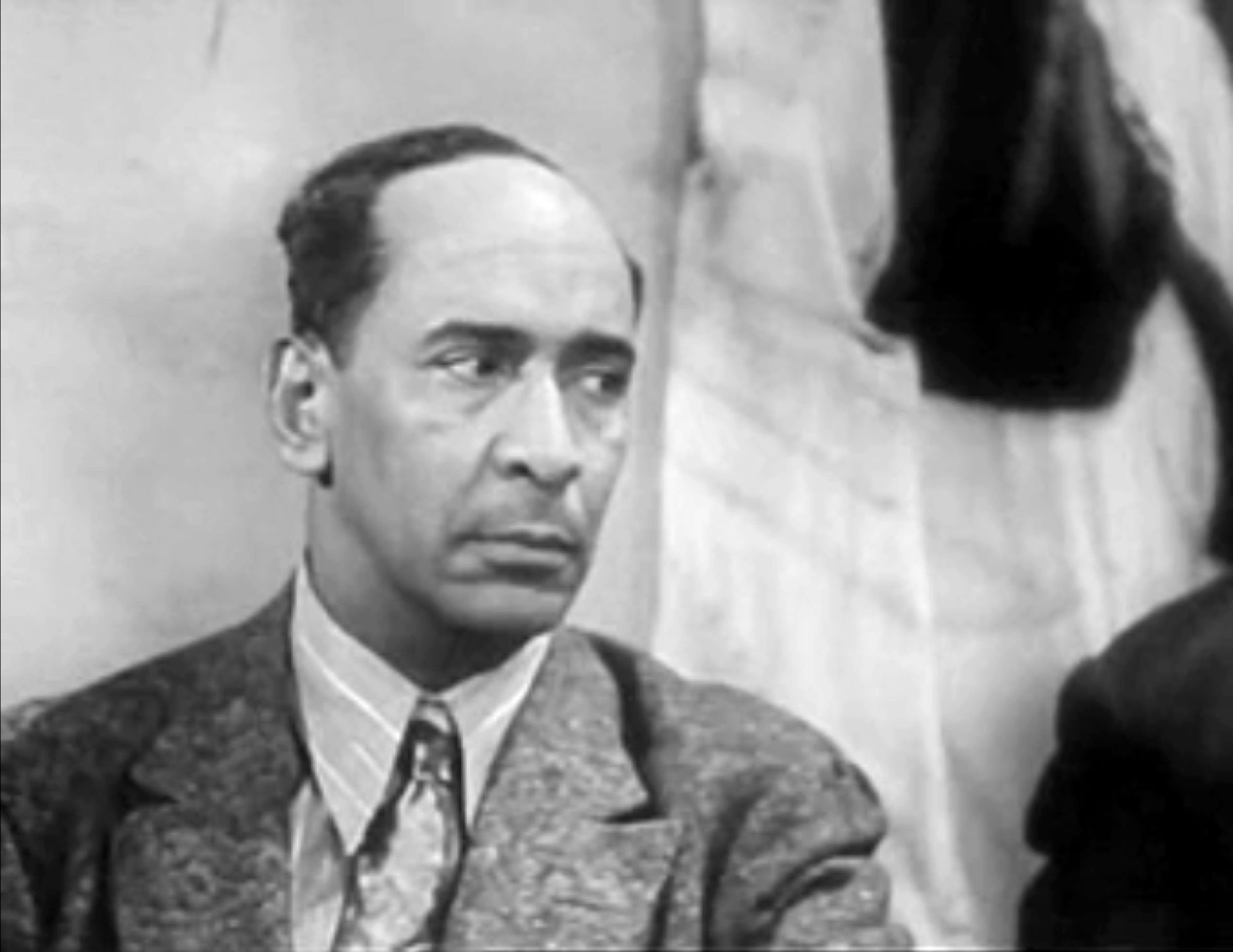
Monagas in the film Paradise in Harlem (1939)

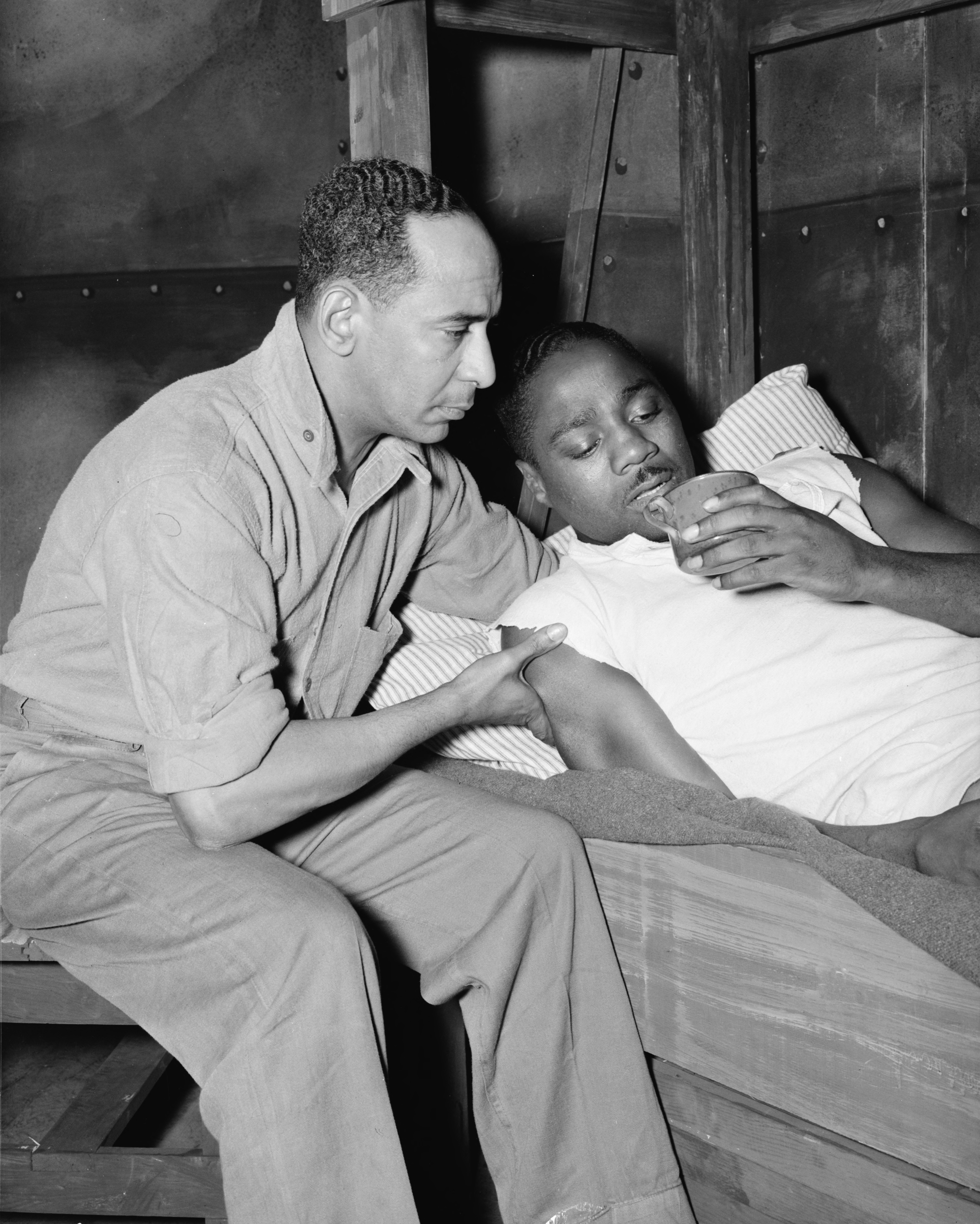
Monagas and Canada Lee in Eugene O'Neill's One-Act Plays of the Sea (1937), for the Federal Theatre Project

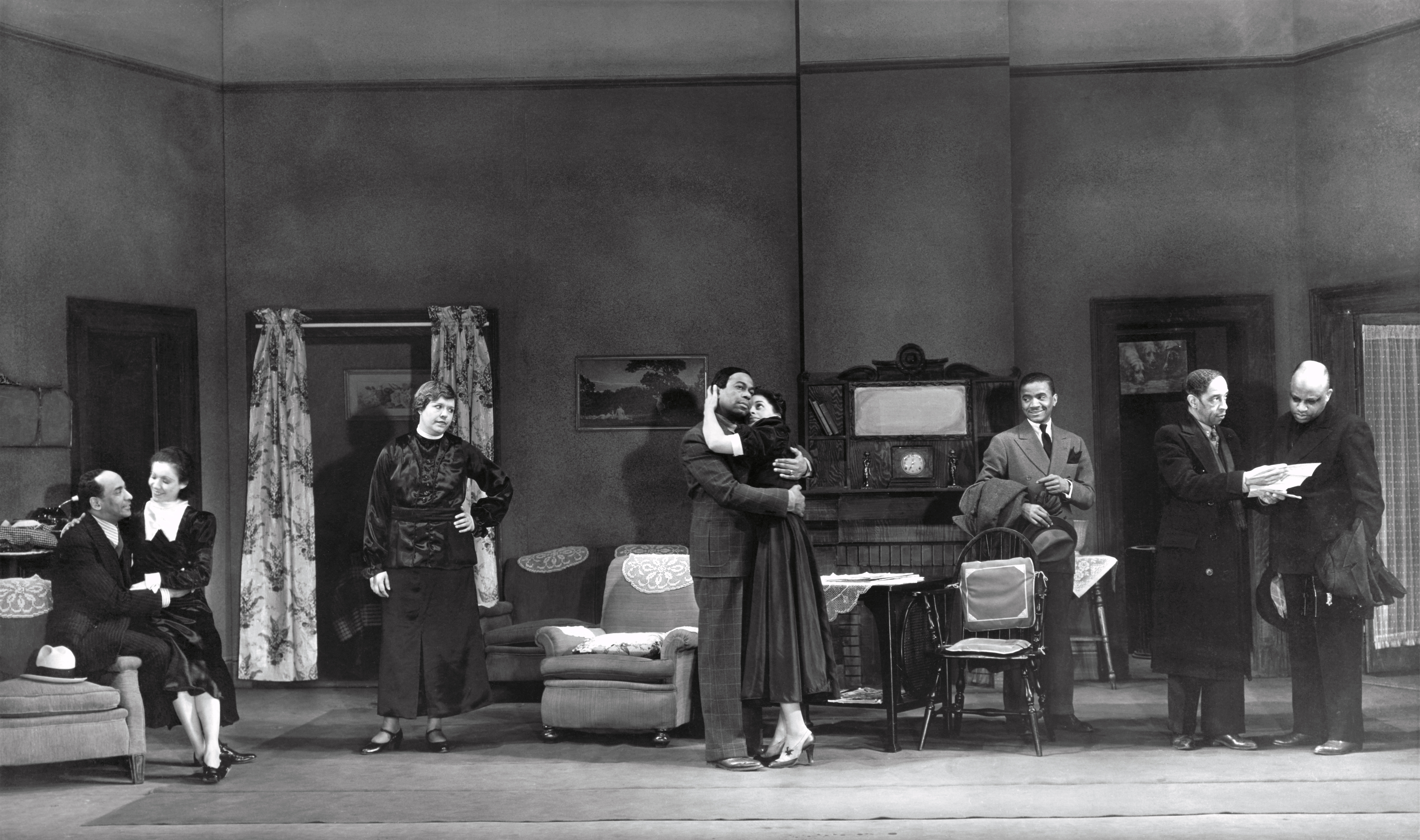
Monagas (left) in the Federal Theatre Project production of The Show-Off (1937), starring Dooley Wilson (center)

Lionel John Monagas (June 26, 1889 – September 3, 1945) was an American actor originally from Caracas, Venezuela. A member of the original Lafayette Players company of Harlem, he appeared in theatrical and film productions.

== Theatre credits ==
Monagas' stage credits are listed at the Internet Broadway Database.

- Confidence (1920)
- The Heartbreaker (1920)
- An African Prince (1920)
- Salome (1923)
- The Comedy of Errors (1923)
- Runnin' Wild (1924)
- Appearances (1925)
- My Magnolia (1926)
- Miss Calico (1926)
- Slim Slivers (1927)
- Ol' Man Satan (1932)
- Louisiana (1933)
- Hummin' Sam (1933)
- Blackbirds of 1933 (1933)
- Roll, Sweet Chariot (1934)
- The Man from Baltimore (1920)
- Walk Together Chillun (1936)
- Conjur' Man Dies (1936)
- The Show-Off (1937)
- One-Act Plays of the Sea (1937)
- Big White Fog (1940)
- The Eternal Magdalene (1943)
- Peepshow (1944)
- Anna Lucasta (1944)

== Filmography ==
- The Millionaire (1927)
- Drums O' Voodoo (1934) as Ebenezer
- Lem Hawkins' Confession (1935)
- Murder in Harlem (1935)
- Keep Punching (1939)

== Personal life ==
Monagas served in the United States Army in World War I, in the 92nd Division. He was buried on September 6, 1945, at Long Island National Cemetery.
