= Theodore Ward =

African-American playwright (1902–1983)

- Born: James Theodore Ward; September 15, 1902; Thibodaux, Louisiana
- Died: May 8, 1983 (aged 80); Chicago, Illinois
- Education: University of Utah (1930-31); University of Wisconsin (1931-33)
- Occupations: Playwright, theatre educator
- Spouse: Mary Sangigian (m. 1940)
- Writing career
- Notable works: Big White Fog (1938); Our Lan' (1947)
- Notable awards: Theatre Guild Award (1945); Negro of the Year (1947); Guggenheim Fellowship (1947); Outstanding Pioneer of Black Theatre (1975); DuSable Museum Writers Seminar and Poetry Festival Award (1982)

James Theodore Ward (September 15, 1902 – May 8, 1983) was a leftist political playwright and theatre educator during the first half of the 20th century and one of the earliest contributors to the Black Chicago Renaissance. Often referred to as the "dean of black dramatists," Ward was well known for tackling controversial topics related to African-American urban life during the Great Depression. His staged works were lauded for their innovative depiction of the black experience, most notably for doing away with the spiritual ballads and feverish dancing that dominated "Negro theatricals" of his time in favor of a more nuanced, naturalistic approach to plot and character.

A prolific writer, Ward composed more than thirty plays and co-founded the Negro Playwrights Company with Langston Hughes, Paul Robeson and Richard Wright. His best known works are the drama Big White Fog (1938), produced by the Negro Unit of the Federal Theatre Project in Chicago as well the musical Our Lan' (1947) which premiered on Broadway at New York's Royale Theatre.

== Life ==
=== Early life ===
Ward was born in Thibodeaux, Louisiana, the sixth of eleven children to Everett Ward and his wife Mary Louise (née Pierre). His father had been born into slavery but, upon being granted freedom, became a schoolteacher and part-time salesman to support his growing family. As a result of his father's occupation, Ward was well-educated as a young boy and became interested in writing plays at a very early age. Ward's devout father staunchly disapproved of these artistic ambitions, however, and he once burned one of the boy's early manuscripts calling it, "the work of the devil."

When Ward was 12 years old, his mother died unexpectedly during childbirth and, in the ensuing chaos, the young man left home to travel around the United States by freight train. He headed north, supporting himself with occasional work as a boot-black, hotel bellboy, and barber-shop porter, but eventually ended up in jail for bootlegging in Salt Lake City, Utah. Ward rediscovered his love for writing, and eventually amassed an impressive corpus of poetry, short stories, and essays that helped him to gain entry into an extension program at the University of Utah in 1930. While there, his professor, Louis Zucker, encouraged Ward to apply for the prestigious Zona Gale Fellowship in creative writing at the University of Wisconsin. Ward's essay won the prize, and he departed for the one-year program in Madison, where he studied literature and dramatic arts in addition to working as a script writer and voice actor for WIBA-Radio Madison. Although Zona Gale personally extended Ward's fellowship and arranged for him to stay and enter a degree program despite his lack of a high-school education, the young man declined, citing the unendurable isolation suffered by a black man in an all-white school.

=== The Federal Theatre Project ===
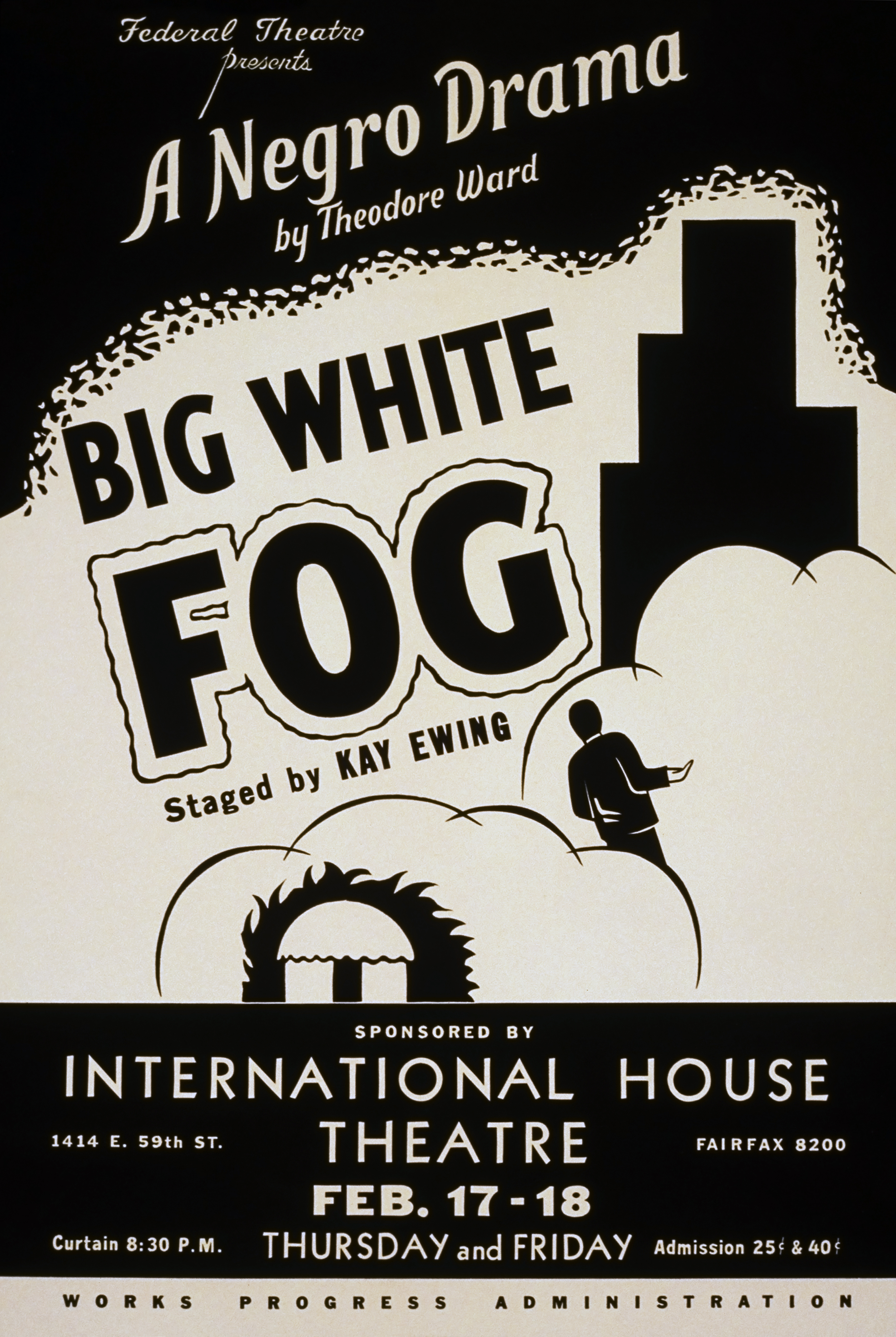
Poster for the Federal Theatre Project's Chicago production of Big White Fog (1938)

Following his departure from the University of Wisconsin in 1933, Ward relocated again, this time to Chicago's South Side, where he used some connections in the Works Progress Administration (WPA) to become the recreation director for the Abraham Lincoln Centre. Though his first position involved teaching speech and dramatic writing to area youth, Ward eventually gained a position with the Negro Unit of Chicago's branch of the Federal Theatre Project (FTP). A New Deal program to fund theatre and other live artistic performances in the United States during the Great Depression, the FTP was one of five Federal One projects sponsored by the WPA that shared a primary goal of creating new jobs for out-of-work artists, writers, and directors; however, these government subsidized programs also served several secondary aims, namely entertaining poor families and creating socially relevant artworks for a changing America.

Ward participated first as an actor with the FTP, but eventually began working on a short theatre piece that he had been inspired to write in 1934 after attending a lecture on the suppression of African-American voting rights in the South at the John Reed Club, a semi-national, Marxist gathering for writers, artists, and intellectuals, named after the American journalist John Reed. After major revisions, Ward entered his one-act play called Sick 'n Tiahd (1937) in the Chicago Repertory Company's annual theatre contest, where it earned second prize, coming in close behind Pulitzer Prize-winner Paul Green's work, Hymn to the Rising Sun (1936).

The short play impressed Ward's fellow writer and John Reed member Richard Wright, who insisted that Ward keep composing for the theatre, even introducing him to the South Side Writers Club, an artistic cooperative of aspiring black writers that included Wright, Arna Bontemps, Frank Marshall Davis, Owen Dodson, George Norford, and Margaret Walker. With their influence and encouragement, Ward completed his first full-length work, Big White Fog, which was produced in 1938 by the Negro Unit of the FTP to much local fanfare.

=== The Negro Playwrights Company ===
The success of Big White Fog in Chicago prompted Ward to seek wider reaching theatrical success in New York City. He traveled east as an actor in the chorus of the FTP's 1939 production of The Swing Mikado, and settled in with Wright in Harlem where he was writing for the Communist newspaper, the Daily Worker. Without warning, however, Congress announced that they were shutting down the increasingly incendiary productions of the Federal Theatre Project, and Ward promptly found himself out of a job. Determined to continue his theatrical experiments and bolstered by Wright's socialist agenda, Ward began searching for private funding and a New York venue to revive the Big White Fog.

After a series of fundraisers and new alliances with New York artists, the play reopened Off-Broadway in 1940 at Harlem's Lincoln Theatre as the inaugural production of Ward's new collaborative project, the Negro Playwrights Company, a theatrical organization born out of the burgeoning culture of the Harlem Renaissance and featuring such up-and-comers as Wright, Paul Robeson, Langston Hughes, Powell Lindsay, and Edna Thomas among others. Although both critics and Ward's contemporaries celebrated the work for its somber realism and politically relevant tone, the general public disapproved of its heavy-handed leftist rhetoric and, as a result, Big White Fog closed after only sixty-four performances, taking the still fledgling Negro Playwrights Company down in its wake.

Ward's time in New York was not completely without success, however. Following a brief courtship, on June 15, 1940, Ward married Mary Sangigian, an Armenian-American artist and social activist from Bridgeport, Connecticut who would go on to work for the National War Labor Board during World War II. Like her husband, Mary Sangigian Ward dedicated much time and energy to social justice reforms and was a major contributor to the Scottsboro Defense, the labor movement, and the fight for Social Security legislation. The couple had two children together, Elise Virginia and Laura Louise.

=== Return to Chicago ===
Following their marriage, Ward and his new wife returned to Chicago where he began work on his next major play, Our Lan' in 1941. The outbreak of World War II, however, delayed the play's first production and, in the interim, Ward was forced to take on odd jobs to support his new family. After brief stints as a factory laborer, a bootblack, and a writer for the Office of War Information, Ward eventually returned to teaching and helped to create several adult writing seminars that he led in Chicago and New Orleans. After the war's end, Ward was finally able to begin publicizing his play about the Reconstruction Era of the United States South. The script earned him a prestigious Theatre Guild Award in 1945 and managed to generate enough interest for the work to premiere at the Henry Street Settlement Playhouse in 1947 and, after a successful showing, transferred to Broadway's Royale Theatre for 42 performances. Although Our Lan' had a relatively short run, the play's premiere on Broadway distinguished Ward as one of the few black writers that was able to get work produced on Broadway following the end of the Harlem Renaissance.

Building on a string of honors that included an award as "Negro of the Year" (1947) and a Rockefeller Foundation National Theatre Conference Fellowship (1948), Ward also became the first Black dramatist to be awarded a Guggenheim Fellowship in 1949, which enabled him to write an eponymous play about the abolitionist John Brown that was later produced in Chicago at the Skyloft Theatre in 1951. In all, Ward wrote more than 30 theatrical productions, numerous essays, several volumes of poetry and two incomplete folk operas. Despite the volume of his work, however, he remains little appreciated by contemporary audiences and scholars, due in part to the lack of popular support for the African-American theatre movement, but also as a direct result of the scant commercial viability of his social realist style, largely serious tone, and left-leaning politics. In fact, Ward was among those "black-listed" during the Red Scare of the McCarthy era. As a result of this extended marginalization, Ward continually struggled to earn a living as a writer, and eventually fell out of the public eye. Nevertheless, Ward continued to live and work in Chicago, teaching drama classes for children there in 1963, helping to found the South Side Center for the Performing Arts in 1967, and serving as playwright-in-residence for the Free Southern Theater based in New Orleans during the 1970s. In 1975 he was recognized as an Outstanding Pioneer of Black Theatre, and, in 1982, was given the DuSable Museum Writers Seminar and Poetry Festival Award for Excellence in Drama. Ward died of a heart attack in Chicago on May 8, 1983.

=== Legacy ===
Since Ward's heyday in the 1940s his play have been revived infrequently. Shortly before his death, there was a staged reading of Big White Fog in New York City and, in 1995, the Penumbra Theatre Company's artistic director Lou Bellamy directed a production of the play for The Guthrie Theatre in Minneapolis, Minnesota. A decade later, Big White Fog received its international debut when it was performed at the Almeida Theatre in London in 2007.

Shortly after Ward's death, the Theater Center at Columbia College Chicago recognized Ward's legacy in the professional theatre by sponsoring The Theodore Ward Prize for African-American Playwrights. Since 1985, the competition has offered a generous cash prize and a professional production for the best work of emerging playwrights of African-American descent who choose to write about the black experience in America. In 2015, Ward was inducted into the Chicago Literary Hall of Fame.

== Works ==
Theatre

- 1937: Sick and Tiahd
- 1938: Big White Fog: A Negro Tragedy
- 1938: Even the Dead Arise
- 1942: Deliver the Goods
- 1947: Our Lan'
- 1951: John Brown
- 1953: The Daubers
- 1967: Candle in the Wind
- The Creole (Note: An adaptation of Frederick Douglass's short story The Heroic Slave.)
- Whole Hog or Nothing
- Challenge
- Skin Deep
- Shout Hallelujah
- Falcon of Adowa
- Throwback
- Charity
- John de Conqueror
