= Keep Punching (1939 film) =

1939 American boxing film

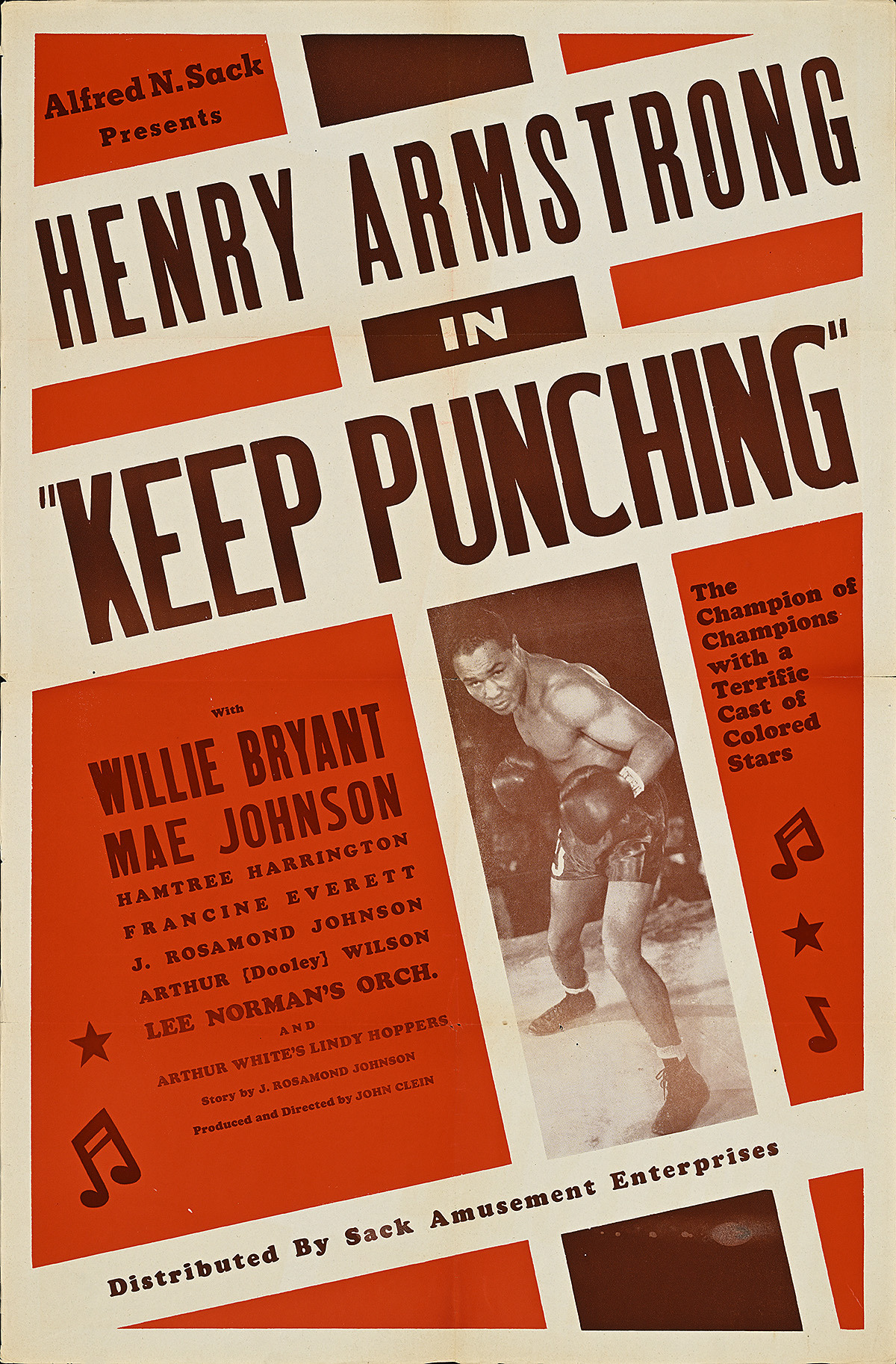
- Poster featuring Henry Armstrong
- Directed by: John Clein
- Screenplay by: Marcy Klauber
- Story by: John Rosamond Johnson
- Produced by: John Clein; Edward Mead
- Starring: Henry Armstrong; Willie Bryant; Mae Johnson; Hamtree Harrington; Francine Everett; Canada Lee; Lionel Monagas; Arthur "Dooley" Wilson; Hilda Offley; Walter Robinson
- Cinematography: J. Burgi Contner; Jay Rescher
- Edited by: Al. Harburger
- Music by: Lee Norman (music score); Dean Cole (sound engineer)
- Production companies: M. C. Pictures, Inc.
- Distributed by: State Rights
- Release dates: December 8, 1939 (Apollo Theater, Harlem)
- Running time: 81 minutes
- Country: United States
- Language: English
- Budget: $28,000

Keep Punching is a 1939 film about boxing. Its primary character is Henry Armstrong (born Henry Jackson). Unlike most films of the era, its cast was composed entirely of African Americans.

The film includes Whitey's Lindy Hoppers (Lindy Hop) performing the much imitated Big Apple Routine. A film clip of the dance scene was also released as the short “Jittering Jitterbugs” in 1943 showing the Big Apple routine choreographed by Frankie Manning and a Jitterbug dance competition that followed in the film.

== Plot ==
Golden Gloves champion Henry Jackson turns professional and gets scheduled into a tough match. Days before the match, he finds an old school friend of his, Frank Harrison, unaware that Frank is betting heavily on his loss. Frank sets Henry up with beautiful Jerry Jordan, who is instructed to get him drunk and impede him in any way possible, due to Frank blackmailing her. On the day of the fight she slips him a sleeping drug.

== Cast ==
It was directed by John Clein and was the first screen appearance of Canada Lee. Other performers include Dooley Wilson, George Wiltshire and boxing champion Henry Armstrong.

- Henry Armstrong
- Willie Bryant
- Mae Johnson
- Hamtree Harrington
- Canada Lee
- Lionel Monagas
- Francine Everett
- Arthur 'Dooley' Wilson
- Hilda Offley
- Walter Robinson

== Home video ==
The film is in the public domain and has been released on a US DVD-R with Two Gun Man from Harlem (1938).
