= John Clein =

Filmmaker

John Clein (1907–?) was an American film producer and film director who was active in the United States and Britain. He produced and directed the 1939 film Keep Punching, whose cast was entirely composed of African Americans; Clein himself was light-skinned.

== Biography ==
Clein was born in 1907 in Pittsburgh, Pennsylvania.

He received plaudits for his casting efforts. Clein made headlines in 1948 when he was kidnapped and forced to sign a contract for a dancer and an extra.

== Filmography ==
=== Director ===
- Keep Punching (1939)

=== Producer ===
- Hearts of Humanity (1932)
- Two Hearts in Harmony (1935)
- The Mill on the Floss (1936)
- Keep Punching (1939)
- Passport to Shame (1958)
- Dr. Crippen (1962)

=== Other roles ===
- Before I Wake, a.k.a. Shadow of Fear (1956) – credited as "Liaison"

== Theater ==
- Devils Galore (1945)
- Swan Song (1946), producer, released as Broadway theatre at Booth Theatre
