= Knock on Wood (1942 song) =

Song written by M.K. Jerome and Jack Scholl

"Knock on Wood" is a song written by M.K. Jerome and Jack Scholl for the film Casablanca, where it was performed onscreen by Dooley Wilson to music played by pianist Elliot Carpenter. Commissioned by producer Hal B. Wallis, the song is the movie's only original composition.

== Performance in Casablanca ==
In the film, band leader Sam, played by Wilson, sings the refrain "Who's got trouble? / Knock on wood" at Rick's Cafe Americain during an early conversation between main character and bar owner Rick Blaine (Humphrey Bogart) and black market dealer Guillermo Ugarte (Peter Lorre). The conversation introduces stolen letters of transit, a plot device that drives the Casablanca story and personal turmoil for Rick. The song foreshadows the role the letters of transit and Ugarte will play in the story and for Rick.
