= Stormy Weather (1943 film) =

1943 American all-Black musical film directed by Andrew L. Stone

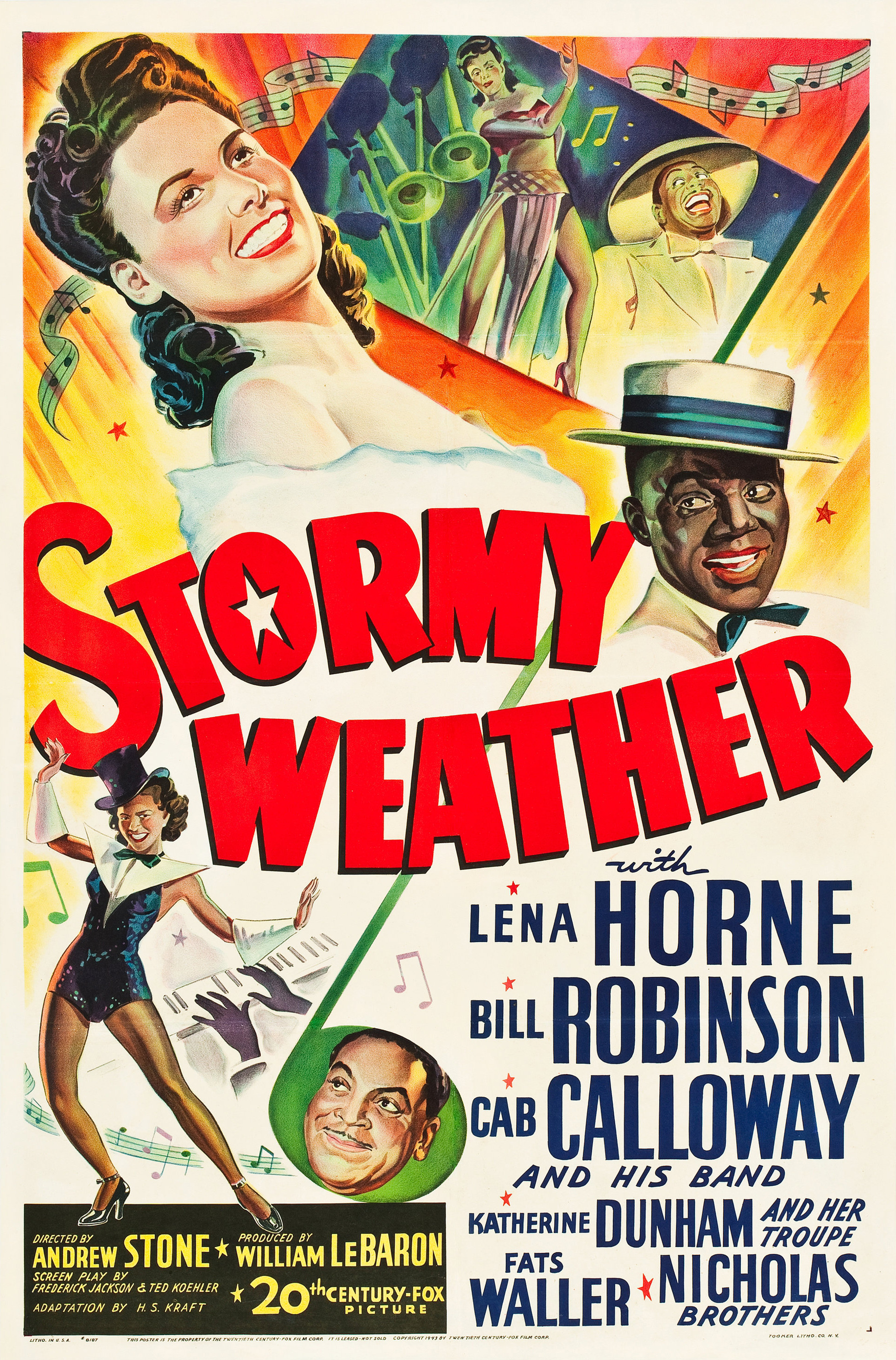
- Theatrical release poster
- Directed by: Andrew L. Stone
- Written by: Jerry Horwin, Seymour B. Robinson (story); Frederick J. Jackson, H.S. Kraft (adaptation)
- Produced by: William LeBaron
- Starring: Lena Horne; Bill Robinson; Cab Calloway; Katherine Dunham; Fats Waller; Nicholas Brothers; Ada Brown; Dooley Wilson
- Cinematography: Leon Shamroy
- Edited by: James B. Clark
- Music by: Harold Arlen; Fats Waller; Shelton Brooks; Cab Calloway; Jimmy Hughes; Dorothy Fields; Bill Robinson; Alfred Newman
- Distributed by: 20th Century Fox
- Release date: July 21, 1943
- Running time: 78 minutes
- Country: United States
- Language: English
- Box office: $1.6 million (US rentals)

Stormy Weather is a 1943 American musical film produced and released by 20th Century Fox, adapted by Frederick J. Jackson, Ted Koehler and H.S. Kraft from the story by Jerry Horwin and Seymour B. Robinson, directed by Andrew L. Stone, produced by William LeBaron and starring Lena Horne, Bill "Bojangles" Robinson, and Cab Calloway. The film is one of two Hollywood musicals with an African American cast released in 1943, both starring Lena Horne, the other being MGM's Cabin in the Sky. Stormy Weather is a primary showcase of some of the leading African American performers of the day, during an era when African American actors and singers rarely appeared in lead roles in mainstream Hollywood productions. The supporting cast features the Nicholas Brothers in arguably the screen's most bravura dance sequence, Fats Waller, Katherine Dunham and her dancers, and Dooley Wilson. Stormy Weather takes its title from the 1933 song of the same title, which is performed almost an hour into the film. It is loosely based upon the life and times of its star, dancer Bill "Bojangles" Robinson.

The character of Selina was invented for the film; Robinson did not have such a romance in real life. Dooley Wilson (the singer/pianist in Casablanca the previous year) co-stars as Bill's perpetually broke but boldly imaginative friend, Gabe, and Emmett "Babe" Wallace appears as Chick Bailey.

Other performers in the movie are Cab Calloway and Fats Waller (both appearing as themselves), the Nicholas Brothers dancing duo, comedian F. E. Miller, singer Ada Brown, and Katherine Dunham with her dance troupe. Despite a running time of only 77 minutes, the film features some 20 musical numbers. This was Robinson's final film (he died in 1949); Waller died only a few months after its release.

== Plot ==
"Mr. Bill" Williamson, a naturally talented dancer, recounts his past to some neighborhood children in a series of flashbacks, which show his return home in 1918 after serving in World War I, meeting a beautiful singer/dancer named Selina Rogers, who is the sister of one of his war buddies, and his travels to New Orleans to become a performer. Along the way he is reunited with Selina, who persuades her manager, Chick Bailey, to hire him for their show, but the jealous Chick fires Bill for outshining him on stage. Bill stages his own show but runs out of money to pay his dancers up front and they refuse to take the stage. Eventually, they do, due to a stroke of luck. At this point in Bill's story to the children, Cab Calloway drives up to collect "Mr. Bill" to appear in his benefit show, where he is reunited with Selina for good.

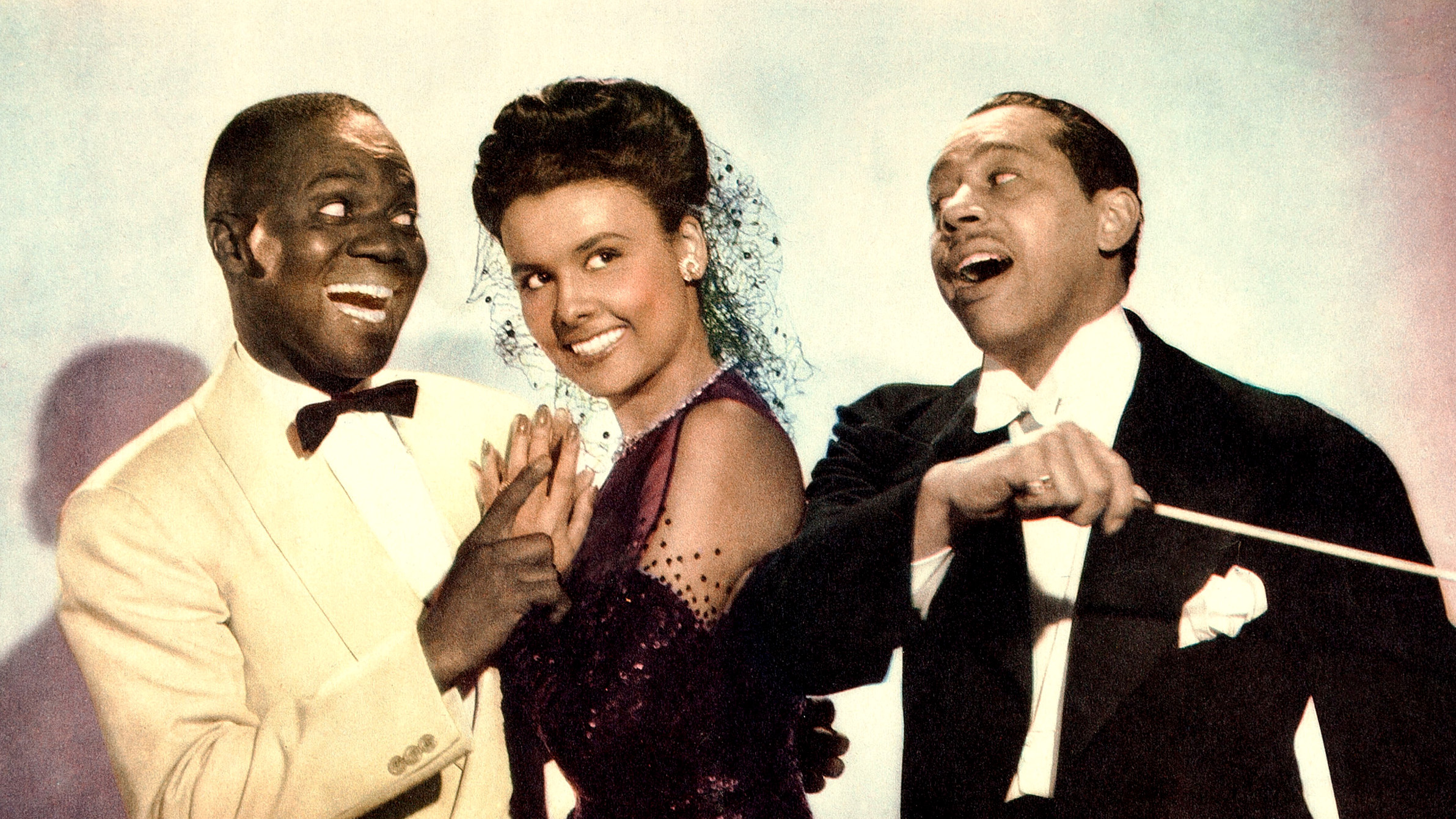
Left to right: Bill Robinson as Bill Williamson, Lena Horne as Selina Rogers, and Cab Calloway as himself.

== Cast ==
- Lena Horne as Selina Rogers
- Bill Robinson as Bill Williamson
- Cab Calloway as himself
- Katherine Dunham as herself
- The Nicholas Brothers as themselves
- Dooley Wilson as Gabe Tucker
- The Tramp Band as themselves
- Fats Waller as himself
- Ada Brown as singer

== Release and legacy ==
The original release prints of Stormy Weather were processed in sepiatone. In 2001, Stormy Weather was selected for preservation in the United States National Film Registry by the Library of Congress, being deemed "culturally, historically, or aesthetically significant."

In 1991, Stormy Weather was released on home video by Fox Video as part of the "Great American Musical Collection". It was released on DVD in North America in 2005.

== Soundtrack ==
The film's musical highlights include Waller performing his composition "Ain't Misbehavin'", Cab Calloway leading his band in his composition "Jumpin' Jive" accompanied by a Nicholas Brothers dance sequence, and a lengthy dance sequence built around the title song, featuring the vocals of Lena Horne and the dancing of Katherine Dunham. Horne also performs in several dance numbers with Robinson. It was one of her few non-MGM film appearances, and one of only two films from the 1930s-1940s in which Horne played a substantial role. Ford Dabney was a consultant on the music for the film.

The soundtrack has been released on CD by 20th Century Fox references 7822–11007, though Sunbeam Records released the soundtrack on vinyl in 1976. The Soundtrack Factory CD includes Lena Horne singing "Good For Nothin' Joe", a song that did not appear in the movie. Other songs include:

- "Walkin' the Dog" – Orchestra
- "There's No Two Ways About Love" – Lena Horne
- "Cakewalk"/"Camptown Races"/"At a Georgia Camp Meeting" – Orchestra
- "Moppin' and Boppin'" – Fats Waller
- "That Ain't Right" – Ada Brown and Fats Waller
- "Ain't Misbehavin'" – Fats Waller
- "Diga Diga Doo" – Lena Horne
- "I Lost My Sugar in Salt Lake City" – Mae E. Johnson
- "Nobody's Sweetheart" (instrumental) – Orchestra
- "I Can't Give You Anything but Love, Baby" – Lena Horne, Bill Robinson, and others
- "Geechy Joe" – Cab Calloway & his Orchestra
- "Stormy Weather" – Lena Horne
- "Stormy Weather Ballet" – danced by Katherine Dunham and her Dance Troupe
- "There's No Two Ways About Love" (Reprise) – Cab Calloway, Bill Robinson, and Lena Horne
- "My, My Ain't That Somethin'" – Bill Robinson
- "Jumpin' Jive" – Cab Calloway & his Orchestra, danced by the Nicholas Brothers
- "My, My Ain't That Somethin'" (reprise) – Lena Horne, Bill Robinson, Cab Calloway

== Critical reception ==
Shane Vogel suggests that Lena Horne and Katherine Dunham's performances of "Stormy Weather" in the film are, like Ethel Waters' performance of the song in The Cotton Club Parade of 1933, African American modernist critiques of American culture.

Fred Astaire told the Nicholas Brothers that the "Jumpin' Jive" dance sequence was "the greatest movie musical number he had ever seen".

On Rotten Tomatoes, the film holds a 95% approval rating from 41 reviews.

== Stereotypes ==
Although Stormy Weather and other musicals of the 1940s opened new roles for African Americans in Hollywood, breaking through old stereotypes and far surpassing limited roles previously available in race films produced for all-black audiences, it still perpetuates stereotypes. Notably, the musical numbers in the movie contain elements of minstrelsy. The performance of a cakewalk, for example, features flower headdresses reminiscent of the Little Black Sambo figures used in historical misrepresentations of Black American males.
