= Miracle in Harlem =

1948 film

- Directed by: Jack Kemp
- Written by: Vincent Valentini (story and screenplay)
- Produced by: Jack Goldberg; David Goldberg
- Cinematography: Don Malkames
- Edited by: Don Drucker
- Music by: Jack Shaindlin; Juanita Hall
- Production company: Herald Pictures
- Distributed by: Screen Guild Productions
- Release date: 1948
- Running time: 69 minutes
- Country: United States
- Language: English

Miracle in Harlem is a 1948 American musical melodrama film, directed by Jack Kemp, and starred an all African American cast. It has been considered one of the best all-black independent films of the 1940s. It was produced by Jack Goldberg and Herald Pictures.

== Plot ==
A businessman fakes his own death, for business reasons. A young woman is suspected of killing the business magnate who swindled her out of her family run candy business.

== Cast ==
- Sheila Guyse as Julie Weston
- Hilda Offley as Aunt Hattie
- William Greaves as Bert Hallam
- Creighton Thompson as Reverend Jackson
- Lawrence Criner as Albert Marshall (father)
- Sybil Lewis as Alice Adams
- Kenneth Freeman as Jim Marshall (son)
- Jack Carter as Phillip Manley
- Milton Williams as Mr. Wilkinson
- Monte Hawley as Lieutenant Renard
- Alfred "Slick" Chester as Detective Tracy (as Alfred Chester)
- Ruble Blakey as Detective Foley
- Stepin Fetchit as Swifty the Handyman

=== Specialties acts (as featured on the soundtrack) ===
- Creighton Thompson as singer, 'A Preaching Song'
- Savannah Churchill as singer, 'I Want be Loved'
- Lavada Carter as singer, 'John Saw the Number'
- Norma Shepherd as singer, 'Patience & Fortitude'
- Sheila Guyse as singer, 'Look Down That Lonesome Road'
- Juanita Hall as singer, 'Chocolate Candy Blues'
- Lynn Proctor Trio as Lynn Proctor Trio Singers, 'Watch Out'
- Juanita Hall Choir as Juanita Hall Choir, performing 'Swing Low, Sweet Chariot' & 'Nearer My God To Thee'
- Hilda Geeley as singer (uncredited)
