= Hearts of Humanity (1932 film) =

1932 film

- Directed by: Christy Cabanne
- Screenplay by: Edward T. Lowe
- Story by: Olga Printzlau
- Produced by: John Clein
- Starring: Jean Hersholt; Jackie Searl; J. Farrell MacDonald
- Cinematography: Charles Stumar
- Edited by: Don Lindberg
- Music by: Brown-Spencer
- Production company: Majestic Pictures
- Release date: September 1, 1932 (US)
- Running time: 65 minutes
- Country: United States
- Language: English

Hearts of Humanity is a 1932 American drama film, directed by Christy Cabanne. It stars Jean Hersholt, Jackie Searl, and J. Farrell MacDonald, and was released on September 1, 1932.

== Plot ==
Recently orphaned boy is raised and loved by his widower neighbor, with support from the ethnically diverse neighborhood.

== Cast ==
- Jean Hersholt as Sol Bloom
- Jackie Searl as Shandy
- J. Farrell MacDonald as Tom O'Hara
- Claudia Dell as Ruth Sneider
- Charles Delaney as Tom Varney
- Lucille La Verne as Mrs. Sneider
- Dick Wallace as Joey Bloom
- George Humbert as Tony
- Betty Jane Graham as Hilda
- John Vosburgh as Dave Haller
