= Hilda Offley =

American actress (1894–1968)

- Born: June 27, 1894; Philadelphia, Pennsylvania, U.S.
- Died: March 1968 (aged 73–74); New York City, USA, U.S.
- Occupation: Actress
- Spouse: Creighton Thompson (m. 1916-1968, her death)

Hilda Offley (June 27, 1894 – March 1968) was an American actress who performed on stage in productions with African American casts during the 1930s and 1940s and in several all-Black cast films including Keep Punching in 1939 as Mrs. Jackson, Sepia Cinderella in 1947 as Mama Keyes, and Miracle in Harlem in 1948 as Aunt Hattie. Her film work contributed to the era's race film genre, which featured African American performers and catered to black audiences.

== Early life and career ==
Hilda Offley was born in Philadelphia, Pennsylvania, on June 27, 1894. Little is known about her family or her educational background before her career. In the 1930s and 1940s, she starred in various theatre productions such as "Big White Fog" and "The Long Voyage Home". She was also one of the four members of the "Lafayette Players" at the Lafayette theatre in New York. Her film career was rather short, consisting of three independently produced race films: Keep Punching (1939), Sepia Cinderella (1947), and Miracle in Harlem (1948).

== Personal life ==
Hilda Offley married Creighton Thompson on May 28, 1916. Both appeared in the film Miracle in Harlem. Their marriage lasted until Offley's death in May 1968, spanning over 51 years.

== Filmography ==
Stage

Year	Title	Role
1932	Ol' Man Satan	First David Temptress
1936	Walk Together Chillun	Martha Ray Browne
1937	The Long Voyage Home	Freda
1938	Androcles and the Lion	Megaera
1940	Big White Fog	Ellen Mason
1946	Lysistrata	Old Women's Chorus

Film

Year	Title	Role
1947	Sepia Cinderella	Mama Keyes
1948	Miracle in Harlem	Aunt Hattie

== See also ==
- African American cinema
