= Dooley Wilson =

American actor, musician (1886–1953)

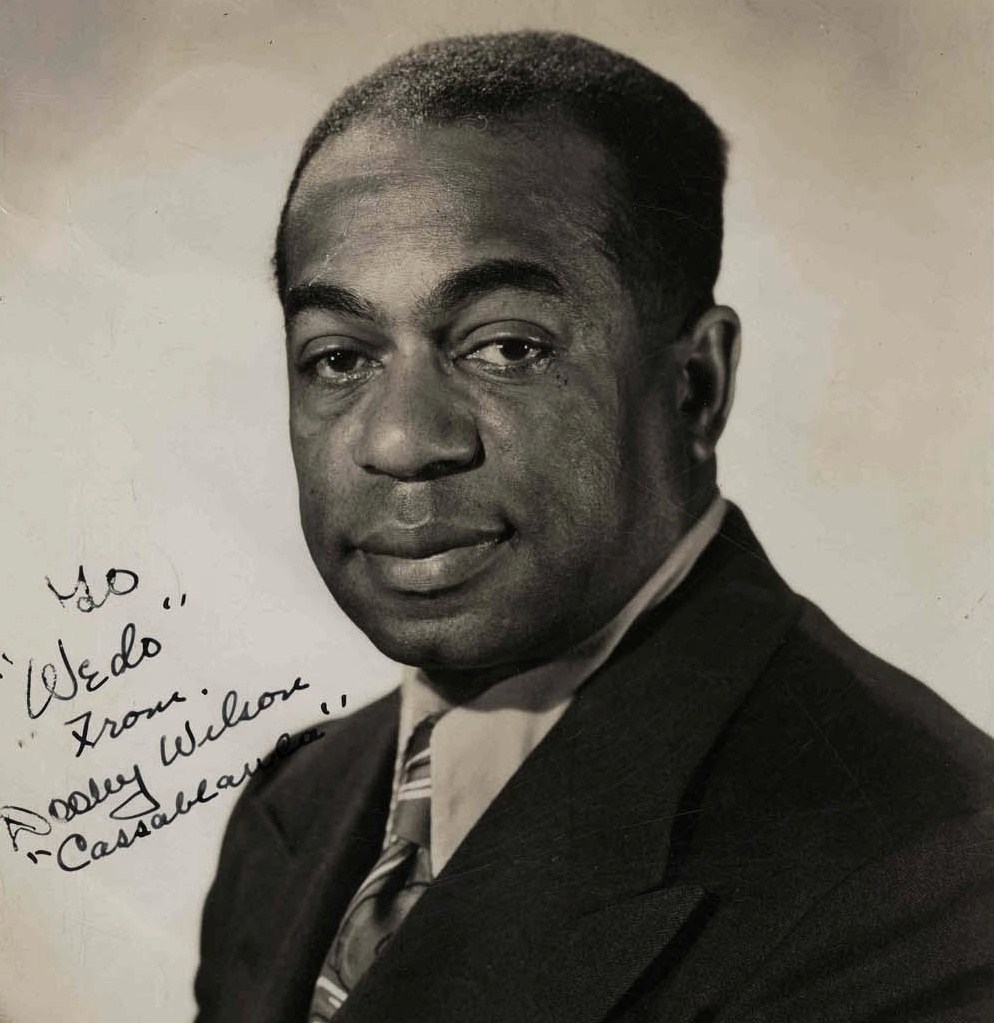
- Wilson in 1945
- Born: Arthur Wilson; April 3, 1886; Tyler, Texas, U.S.
- Died: May 30, 1953 (aged 67); Los Angeles, California, U.S.
- Resting place: Angelus-Rosedale Cemetery
- Occupations: Actor; singer; musician
- Years active: 1893–1952
- Spouse(s): Estelle Williams (m. 19??; his death 1953)

Arthur "Dooley" Wilson (April 3, 1886 – May 30, 1953) was an American actor, singer and musician who is best remembered for his portrayal of Sam in the 1942 film Casablanca. In that romantic drama, he performs its theme song "As Time Goes By".

Wilson was a drummer and singer who led his own band in the 1920s, touring nightclubs in London and Paris. In the 1930s he took up acting, playing supporting roles onstage on Broadway and in a series of modest films. His role in Casablanca was by far his most prominent, but his other films included My Favorite Blonde (1942) with Bob Hope, Stormy Weather (1943) with Lena Horne and the Nicholas Brothers, and the Western Passage West (1951).

== Early life and career ==
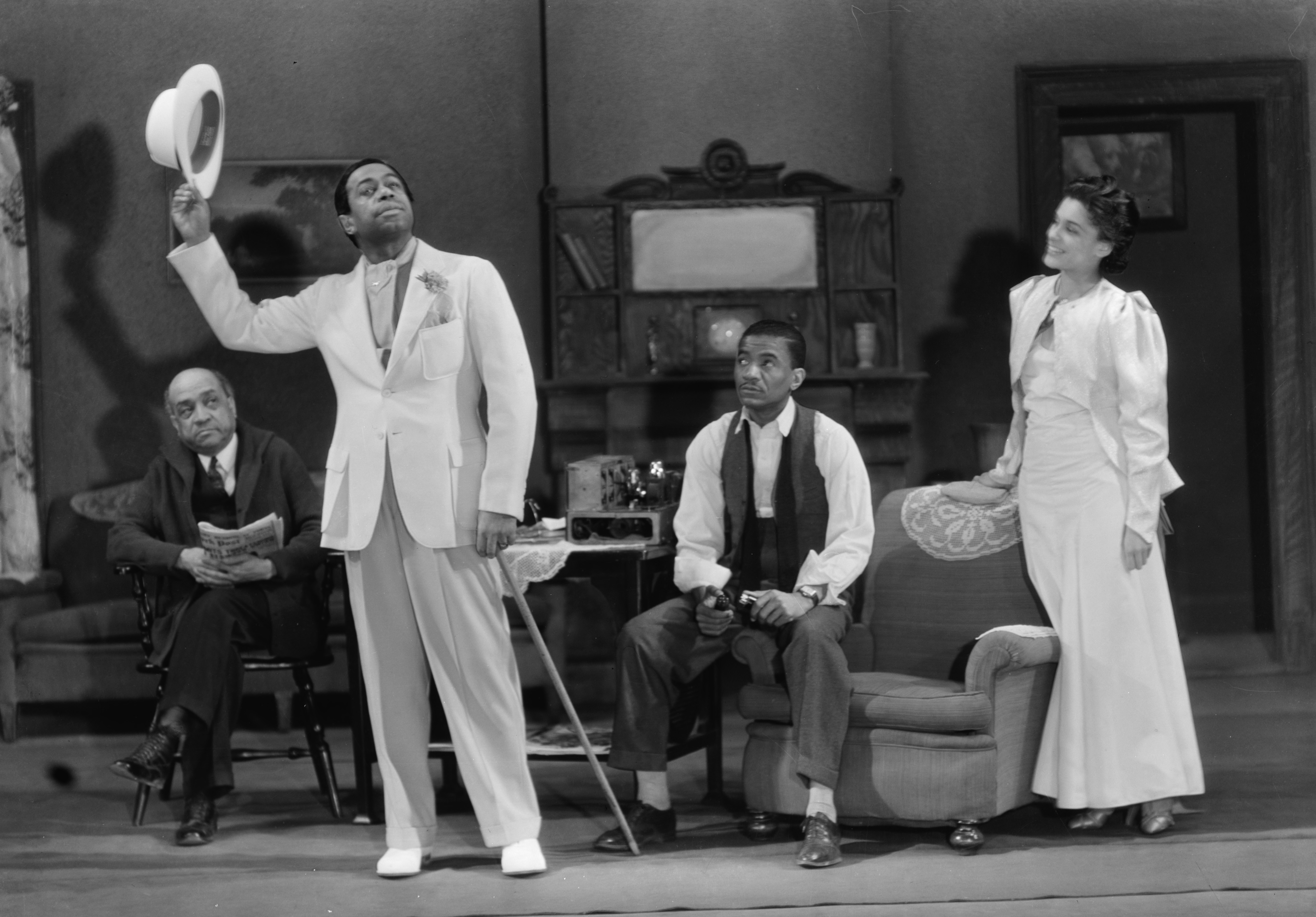
Wilson starring in the Federal Theatre Project production of The Show-Off (1937)

Arthur Wilson was born in Tyler, Texas, the youngest of five children. At age seven, the year of his father's death, he began to earn a living by performing in churches in Tyler. When he was eight years old he was earning $18 a week, singing and playing in tent shows. By 1908 he was in Chicago in the repertory company of the Pekin Theatre, the first legitimate black theatre in the United States. By then he had earned the nickname "Dooley", for his whiteface impersonation of an Irishman singing a song called "Mr. Dooley".

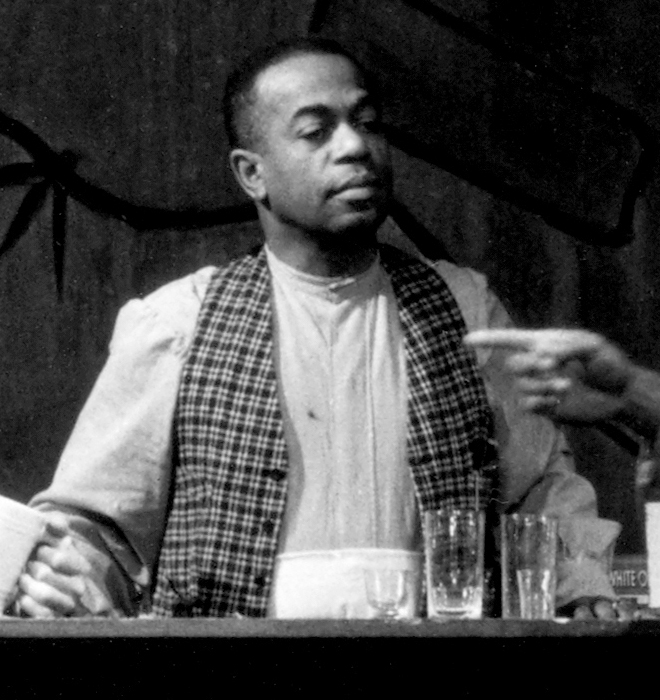
Wilson as Fat Joe in the Federal Theatre Project revival of Eugene O'Neill's The Long Voyage Home, comprised in the production One-Act Plays of the Sea (1937)

Part of the emerging African American theatre scene, Wilson worked with the Anita Bush company in New York City in 1914 and with Charles Gilpin's stock company at the Lafayette Theatre in Harlem in 1915. He performed in James Reese Europe's band, and after World War I he toured Europe with his own band, The Red Devils, throughout the 1920s.

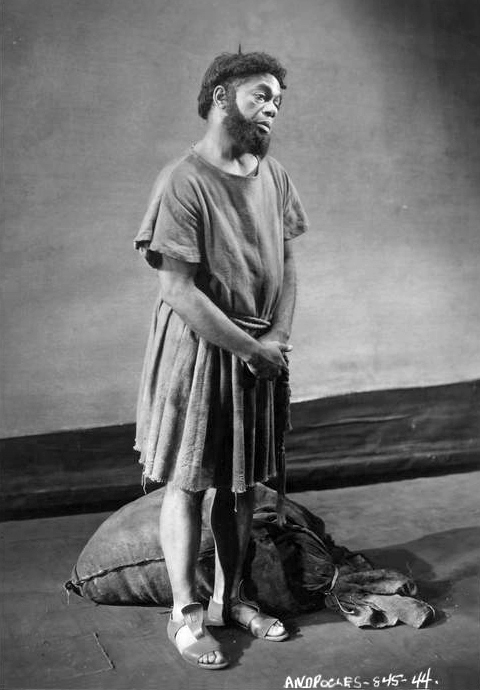
Wilson as Androcles in the Federal Theatre Project production of Androcles and the Lion (1938)

Working in the U.S. again during the Great Depression, Wilson starred in Rudolph Fisher's Conjur' Man Dies (1936) and other plays for the Federal Theatre Project's Negro Theatre Unit, then under the direction of John Houseman. His breakthrough role came in 1940, with his portrayal of Little Joe in the Broadway musical Cabin in the Sky. This won him a contract with Paramount Pictures in Hollywood. He found himself playing Pullman porters while his stage role in the MGM film adaptation of Cabin in the Sky was played by Eddie "Rochester" Anderson.

== Casablanca ==
Wilson as the nightclub singer Sam in Casablanca (1942)

In May 1942, Warner Bros. was casting its production of Casablanca and borrowed Wilson from Paramount Pictures for seven weeks at $500 a week. Per the studio custom of the day, Wilson received his contract salary, $350 per week, and Paramount kept the balance.

Wilson was cast in the role of Sam, a singer and pianist employed by nightclub owner Rick (Humphrey Bogart). Wilson performs the Herman Hupfeld song "As Time Goes By", a continuing musical and emotional motif throughout the film. According to Aljean Harmetz, Variety singled out Wilson for the effectiveness of the song, and The Hollywood Reporter said he created "something joyous". The phrase "Play it again, Sam", commonly believed to be a quote from the film, is in fact never heard; Ingrid Bergman's character says "Play it once, Sam. For old times' sake," while Humphrey Bogart's character later says only "Play it!". In the film, Wilson as Sam performs several other songs for the cafe audience: "It Had To Be You", "Shine", "Knock on Wood", "Avalon" and "Parlez-moi d'amour".

Wilson was a singer and drummer, but not a pianist. The piano music for the film was played off-screen, either by Elliot Carpenter or Jean Plummer, and dubbed.

== Later life and career ==
Wilson was cast in the film version of Stormy Weather (1943), as Gabe Tucker, the best friend of Bill Williamson (Bill "Bojangles" Robinson). It was the second all-black cast motion picture made by a major studio in the 1940s, after Cabin in the Sky.

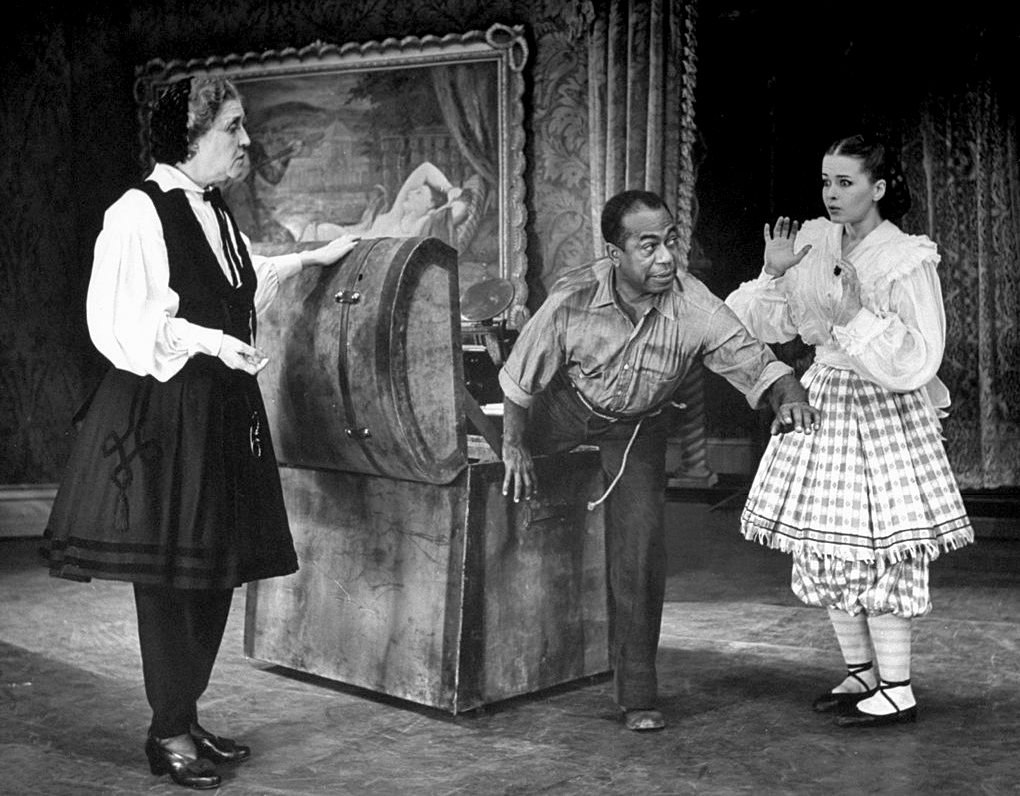
Margaret Douglass, Wilson, and Joan McCracken in the Broadway musical Bloomer Girl (1944)

Back on Broadway, Wilson played Pompey, an escaped slave, in the musical Bloomer Girl (1944–46). His performance of the song "The Eagle and Me" in this show was selected by Dwight Blocker Bowers for inclusion in a Smithsonian recordings compilation, American Musical Theatre. Later, Wilson played the role of Bill Jackson on the television situation comedy Beulah during its 1951–52 season. Wilson was on the executive board of the Negro Actors Guild of America.

== Death and legacy ==
Wilson died May 30, 1953, of natural causes at his home in Los Angeles. He had become ill two years earlier while performing in a New York stage production of Harvey.

In January 2017, Wilson's hometown of Tyler, Texas dedicated a memorial marker to him on its Half Mile of History.

== Filmography ==
Year	Title	Role	Sources
1939	Keep Punching	Baron Skinner	
1942	My Favorite Blonde	Porter	
1942	Take a Letter, Darling	Moses	
1942	Night in New Orleans	Shadrach Jones	
1942	Cairo	Hector	
1942	Casablanca	Sam	
1943	Two Tickets to London	Accordionist	
1943	Stormy Weather	Gabe Tucker	
1943	Higher and Higher	Oscar	
1944	Seven Days Ashore	Jason	
1948	Triple Threat	Porter	Offscreen credit
1948	Racing Luck	Abe	
1949	Knock on Any Door	Piano player	Offscreen credit
1949	Come to the Stable	Anthony James	
1949	Free for All	Aristotle	
1949	Tell It to the Judge	Pullman porter	Offscreen credit
1950	No Man of Her Own	Dining car waiter	Offscreen credit
1950	Father Is a Bachelor	Blue	Offscreen credit
1951	Passage West	Rainbow	
1951–1952	Beulah	Bill Jackson	TV series
