= Andrew Bishop =

Andrew or Andy Bishop may refer to:

- Andrew S. Bishop (1894–1959), American actor
- Andy Bishop (cyclist) (1965–2026), American cyclist
- Andy Bishop (born 1982), English footballer
- Andrew Bishop (rugby union) (born 1985), Welsh rugby union player
- Andrew Bishop, bassist with the American country rock band The Red Clay Strays
