= Big Timers =

1945 American musical comedy film

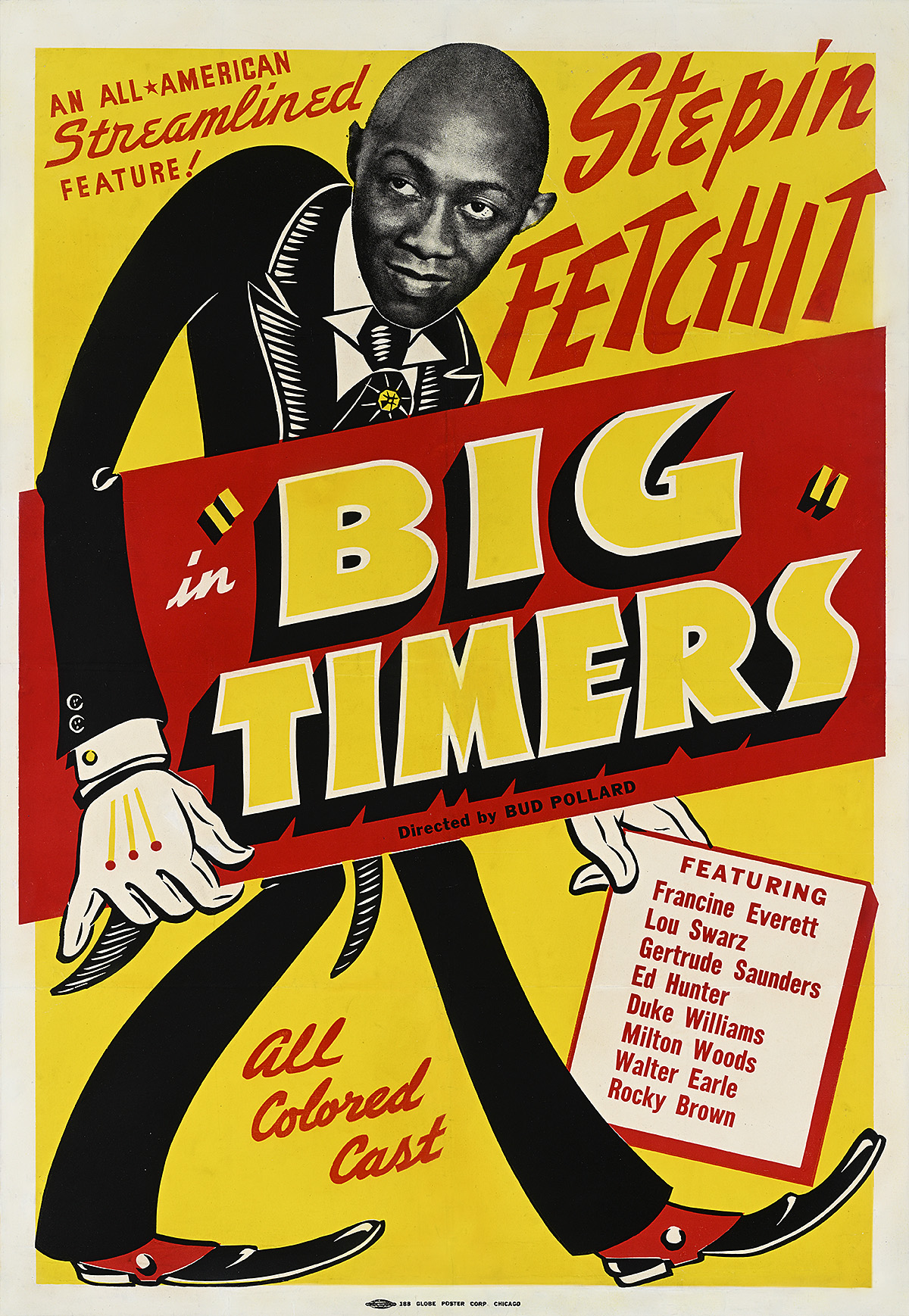
- Poster for original theatrical release
- Directed by: Bud Pollard
- Produced by: E.M. Glucksman (producer)
- Starring: Stepin Fetchit, Francine Everett, Lou Swarz, Milton Woods
- Cinematography: Lester Lang
- Edited by: Bud Pollard
- Release date: 1945
- Running time: 36 minutes
- Country: United States
- Language: English

Big Timers is a short (roughly 36-minute) 1945 American musical comedy race film directed by Bud Pollard. The bottom of a poster for the film notes "The secrets of a chambermaid in a Sugar Hill Hotel!"

The film features a love story.

== Cast ==
- Stepin Fetchit
- Francine Everett
- Lou Swarz
- Gertrude Saunders
- Tarzana as The Whoopie Dancer
- Milton Woods
- Duke Williams
- Walter Earle
- Ed Hunter
- Rocky Brown
