= Birthright (1938 film) =

1938 film by Oscar Micheaux

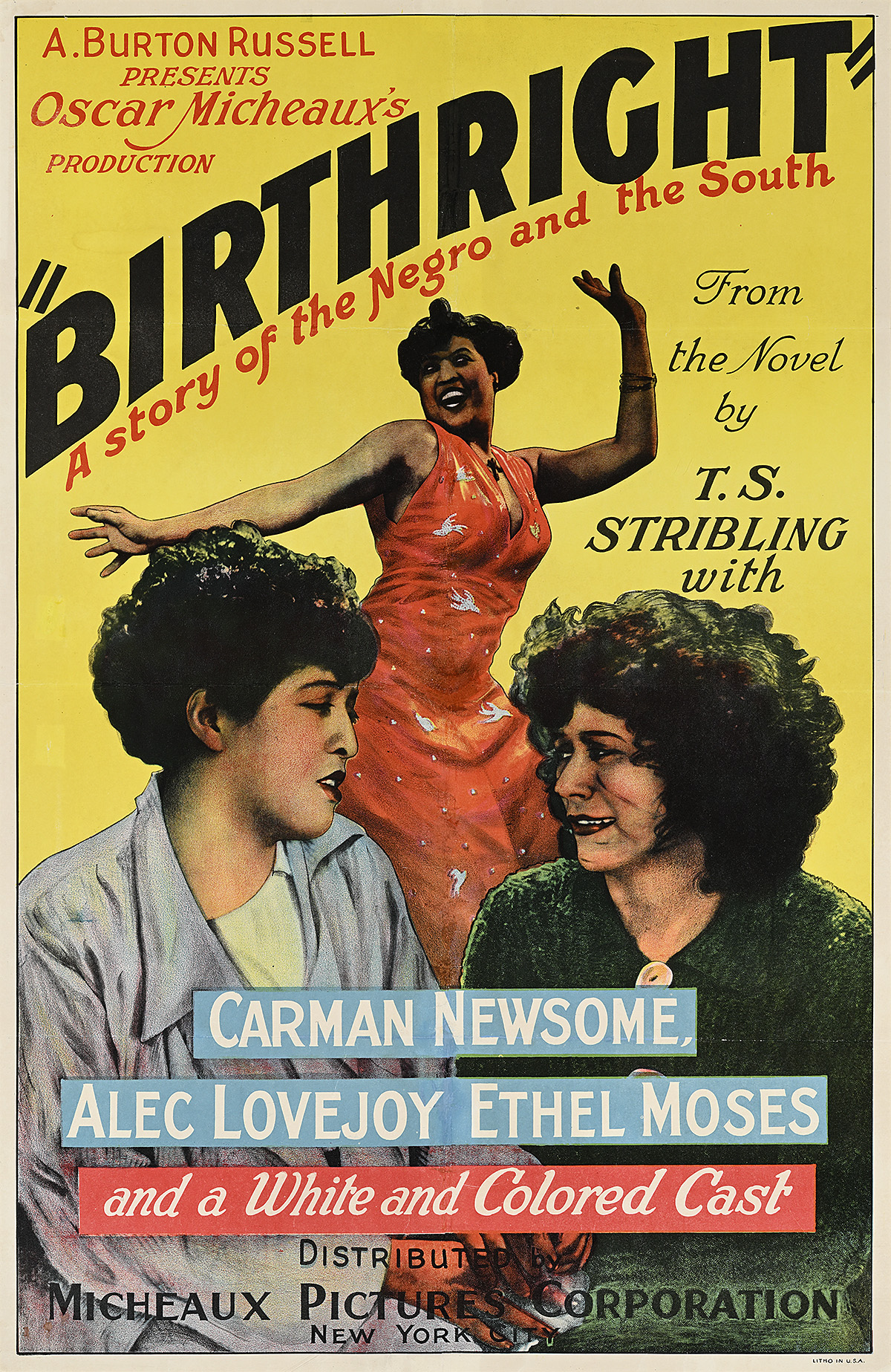
- Directed by: Oscar Micheaux
- Written by: Oscar Micheaux
- Based on: Birthright by T. S. Stribling
- Produced by: Oscar Micheaux; A. Burton Russell
- Starring: Carman Newsome; Alec Lovejoy; Ethel Moses
- Cinematography: Robert Marshall
- Production company: Micheaux Film
- Distributed by: Micheaux Pictures Corporation
- Release date: May 19, 1938
- Running time: 74 minutes
- Country: United States
- Language: English

Birthright is a 1938 American drama film directed, co-produced and co-written by Oscar Micheaux and starring Carman Newsome. This is a talkie remake of Micheaux's 1924 silent film of the same name; both were adapted from white author T. S. Stribling's eponymous 1922 novel. Starring J. Homer Tutt, Micheaux's 1924 film was highly controversial for its graphic depiction of racism. The film is now considered lost.

== Plot ==
A black Harvard graduate faces racism and discrimination after he returns to his small hometown in Tennessee, where he hoped to develop a school similar to Tuskegee Institute or Hampton Institute, both historically black colleges.

== Cast ==
- Carman Newsome as Peter Siner
- Alec Lovejoy as Tump Pack
- Ethel Moses as Cissie Deldine
- Consuelo Harris as Dancer

== Production ==
The Birthright remake was first scheduled for release in 1937, but in January 1938 it was reported that filming was still taking place in Ridgefield, New Jersey. The crew was estimated to number 15 members.

== Release ==
The exact date of the film's theatrical release is unclear, though it most likely occurred at some point in 1938. Poster House says 1938. By mid-March 1939, the film was playing in theaters in Oakland, California.

Black patrons of Oakland's Lincoln Theater threatened to boycott all black films (also known as race films) after having seen Birthright and Micheaux's 1935 film Temptation, as they accused the films of stereotyping blacks in the same manner as did mainstream Hollywood productions.

== Legacy ==
Although the 1924 film is considered lost, the portion of the 1938 version that survives was restored under Library of Congress supervision and has been preserved in its AFI Collection. Along with other Micheaux films, Birthright is available on The Criterion Channel.
