= Ethel Moses =

American actress and dancer (1904–1982)

- Born: April 29, 1904; Staunton, Virginia, U.S.
- Died: June 1982 (aged 78); Brooklyn, New York City, New York, U.S.
- Occupation(s): Stage and film actress, dancer, chorus girl
- Spouse(s): Benny Payne (divorced), Frank Ryan

Ethel Moses (April 29, 1904 – June 1982) was an American stage and film actress, and dancer. She was billed as "the black Jean Harlow". Moses is best known for working in films by Oscar Micheaux.

== Early life ==
Ethel Moses was born on April 29, 1904, in Staunton, Virginia, the daughter of William Henry Moses and Julia Trent Moses. She was raised in Philadelphia, Pennsylvania. Her sisters Lucia and Julia also became performers; their brother Bill taught at Hampton Institute. Their father was a prominent Baptist preacher in New York who disapproved of (but did not prevent) his daughters' stage careers. Ethel attended the Nannie Helen Burroughs School in the District of Columbia. Her aunt, Lena Trent Gordon, was a Philadelphia-area political organizer who served on a national committee with Burroughs.

== Career ==
In 1924 she made her stage debut as a dancer in a show called Dixie to Broadway. She won a beauty contest at the Savoy Hotel in 1926. In 1929 Ethel Moses was voted the "Shapeliest Chorus Girl" on the New York stage; her sister Lucia placed second in the same poll. She was in the company of a Broadway revival of Showboat in 1932. She danced at the Cotton Club, and toured Europe with the Cab Calloway band.

In the mid-1930s, she began working with filmmaker Oscar Micheaux; her first film role was as "The Bronze Venus", an artist's model who is seen nearly nude on screen, in Micheaux's Temptation (1936). The pair followed that success with Underworld (1937), in which Moses plays a college student, and God's Step Children (also 1937), in which she played two characters. Finally she was in a remake of Micheaux's silent picture, Birthright (remade in 1938). Moses also appeared in several musical shorts, including Cab Calloway's Jitterbug Party (1935).

Ethel Moses left show business by early 1940.

== Personal life ==
Ethel Moses married Benny Payne, a pianist in Cab Calloway's band. They eventually divorced, and in the 1940s Ethel was remarried to a factory worker, Frank Ryan; they lived in Jamaica, Queens. She died in 1982, in Brooklyn, aged 78 years.

Her nephew is Bob Moses, a civil rights activist and educator.

== Legacy ==
Despite her notable presence in the world of Black independent cinema, her career was limited by racial barriers in the American film industry. Several records from the Pearl Bowser Oral History Collection show how Moses claimed that many of her performances were not credited in the film titles or did not receive national distribution. Even though her film career was brief, Moses left a significant mark on Black American Cinema and the representation of American women during the Harlem Renaissance. Her work helped to open up opportunities for Black actresses in narrative productions, and her legacy is now being reclaimed by film historians as an example of talent rendered invisible by the racial structures of classic Hollywood.

== Stage shows ==
- Keep Shuffling (1928)
- Show Boat (1932)
- Black Birds of 1935 (1935)

== Filmography ==
- Birthright (1924)
- Cab Calloway's Hi-De-Ho (1934)
- Cab Calloway's Jitterbug Party (1935)
- Temptation (1936)
- Underworld (1937)
- God's Step Children (1937)
- Harlemania (1938)
- Policy Man (1938)
- Birthright (1938; remake)
- Gone Harlem (1939)
