= Dolly Jones =

Dolly Jones may refer to:

- Adolphus Jones (born 1984), track and field athlete and soccer player from Saint Kitts and Nevis
- Dolly Jones (trumpeter) (1902–1975), jazz trumpeter and cornetist
