= Lena Trent Gordon =

American social worker, orator, government official and poet

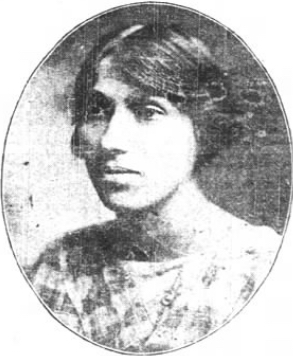
- Lena Trent Gordon, from a 1923 newspaper.
- Born: Lena Bessie Trent; 1885; Cumberland County, Virginia
- Died: June 14, 1935 (aged 49–50); Philadelphia, Pennsylvania

Lena Trent Gordon (1885 – June 14, 1935) was an American social worker, orator, government official, and poet, based in Philadelphia, Pennsylvania.

== Early life ==
Lena Bessie Trent was born in Cumberland County, Virginia, the daughter of Peter Field Trent and Lucy Trent. Her older sister Julia married Rev. William Henry Moses; through them, her niece was actress Ethel Moses, and her great-nephew is educator and civil rights activist Bob Moses.

== Career ==
Gordon was active in Philadelphia community organizing. She had a mayoral appointment as chief investigator in the Legal Aid Bureau of the Department of Public Welfare. Mayor W. Freeland Kendrick, congressman William Scott Vare, and other officials gave testimonials a banquet in her honor in 1924. She worked in the presidential campaigns of Warren G. Harding, Calvin Coolidge, and Herbert Hoover, and for other Republican candidates for political office. She served in the Hoover administration, on the National Committee on Negro Housing, headed by Nannie Helen Burroughs. She was president of the William Penn Club.

Gordon was a popular speaker at community events. She gave a lecture in Pittsburgh in 1925 on "Religion and World Culture": "The inventors, astronomers, poets and scientists teach us every day that man's real happiness is only to be found along the road of progress," she declared, adding "Every hour is crowded full of fascinating problems, all awaiting investigation." In 1928, she was on the program of speakers for the All-Philadelphia Inter-racial Peace Meeting, along with pacifists Wilbur K. Thomas and Camille Drevet, labor leader J. Finley Wilson, Mayor Harry A. Mackey, Alice Dunbar Nelson, and W. E. B. Du Bois.

Gordon also wrote poetry for the Pittsburgh Courier newspaper.

== Personal life ==
Lena B. Trent married Samuel G. Gordon in 1910. They had a daughter, Aurelia. Lena Trent Gordon died in 1935, aged about fifty years.
