= Nannie Helen Burroughs School =

- Trades Hall of National Training School for Women and Girls
- U.S. National Register of Historic Places
- U.S. National Historic Landmark
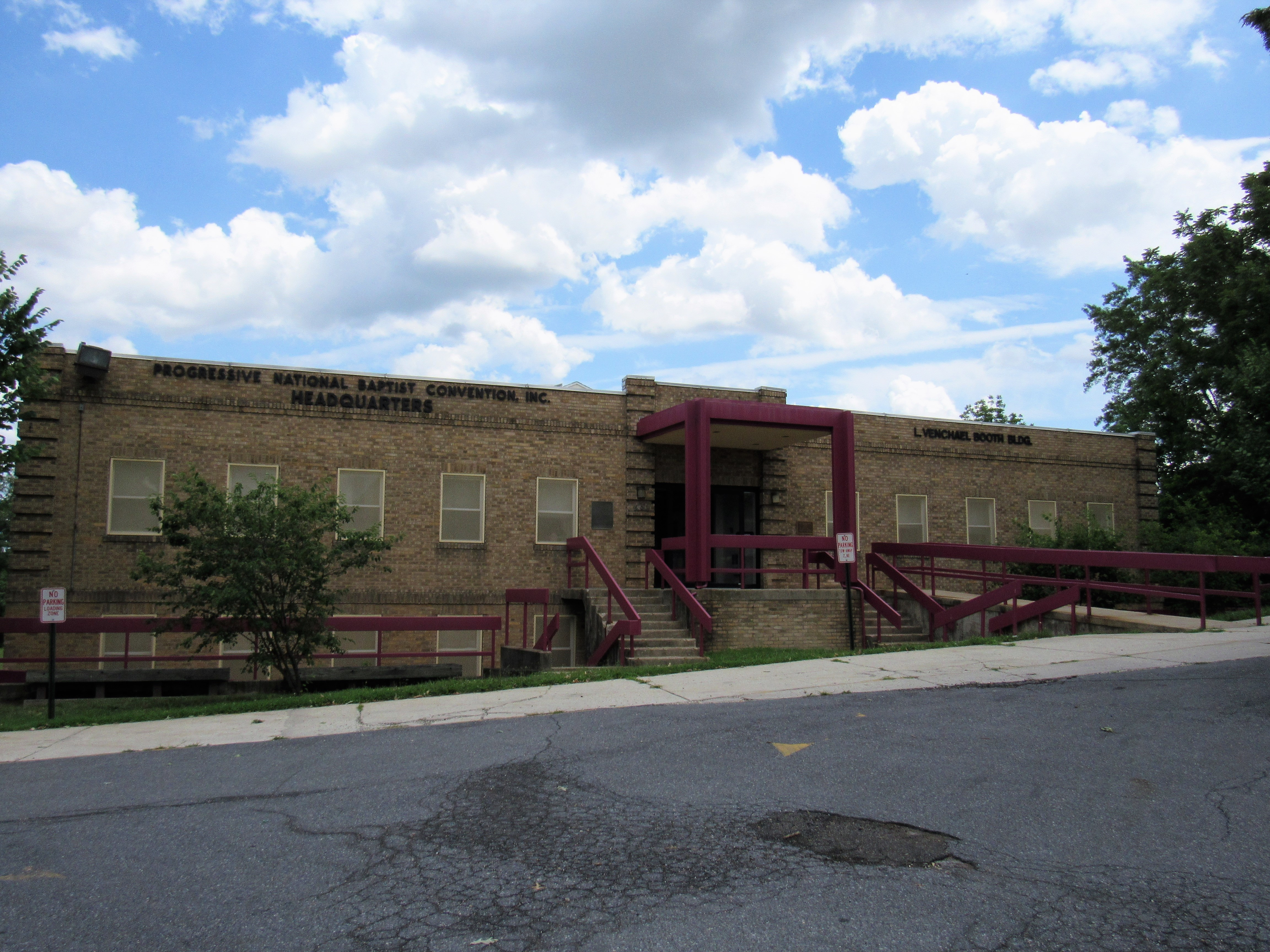
- The 1928 Trades Hall building

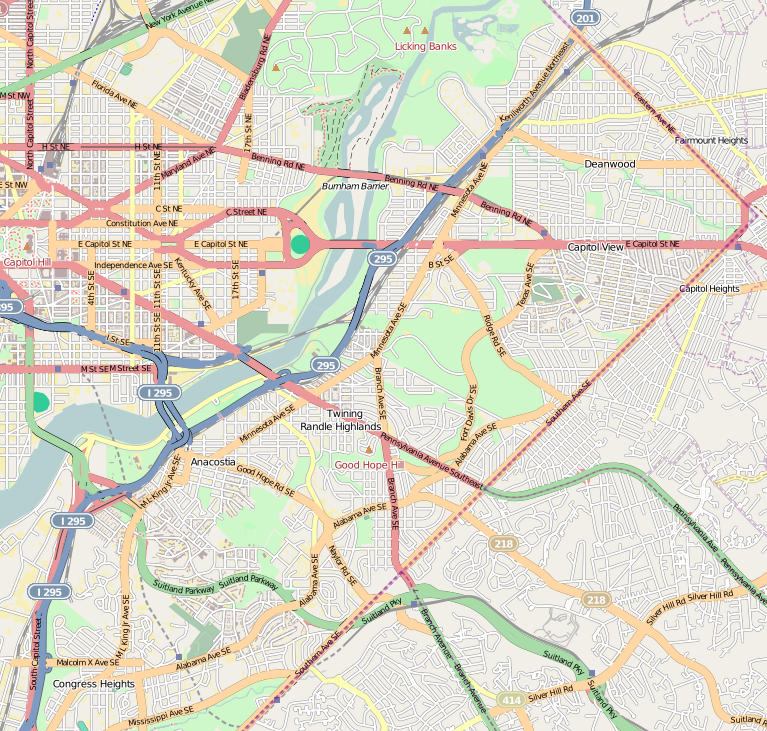
- Location within Washington, D.C.
- Location: 601 50th St., NE., Washington, D.C.
- Coordinates: 38°53′50″N 76°55′44″W
- Area: less than one acre (landmarked area)
- Architect: Thomas M. Medford
- Architectural style: Renaissance
- NRHP reference No.: 91002049

Significant dates
- Added to NRHP: July 17, 1991
- Designated NHL: July 17, 1991

The Nannie Helen Burroughs School, formerly known as National Training School for Women and Girls, was a private coeducational elementary school at 601 50th Street NE in Washington, D.C. The school was founded in 1909 by Nannie Helen Burroughs as The National Trade and Professional School for Women and Girls, Inc. and was the first school in the nation to provide vocational training for African-American females, who did not otherwise have many educational opportunities available to them. The 1928 Trades Hall building, the oldest building on the campus, was declared a National Historic Landmark in 1991. The property now houses the headquarters of the Progressive National Baptist Convention as well as the Monroe School, a private junior-senior high school that continues Burroughs' legacy.

== Campus ==
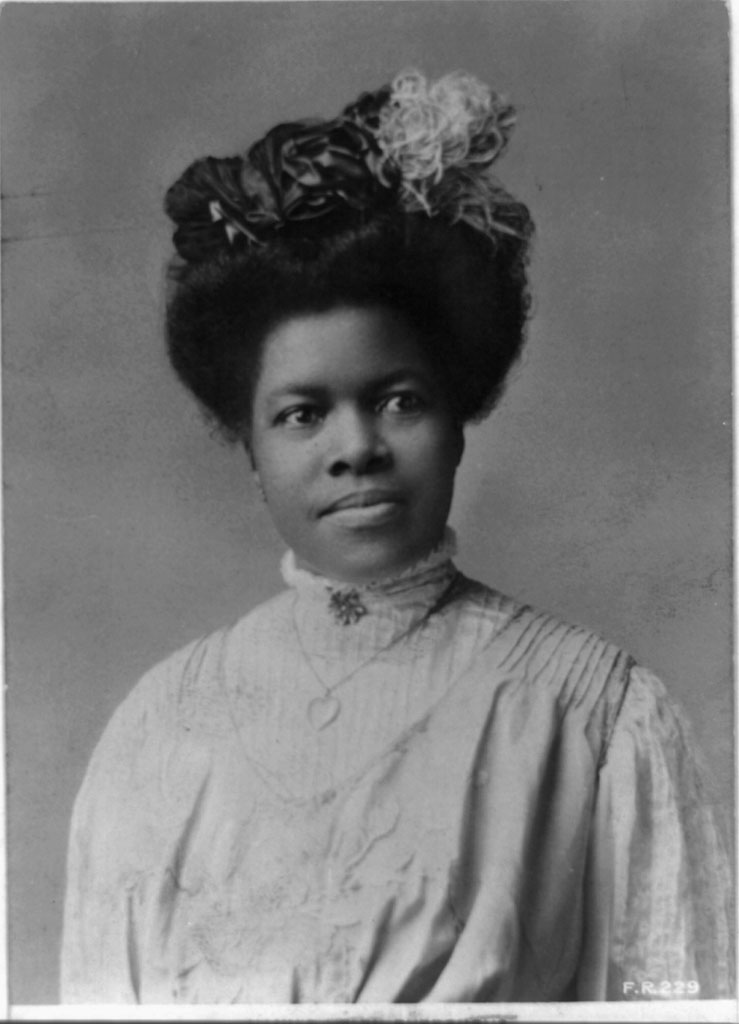
Nannie Helen Burroughs

The former Nannie Helen Burroughs School property consists of 6 acres (2.4 ha) at the southeast corner of 50th Street NE and Nannie Helen Burroughs Avenue NE. There are four buildings on the hilly campus, of which the 1928 Trades Hall is the furthest east.

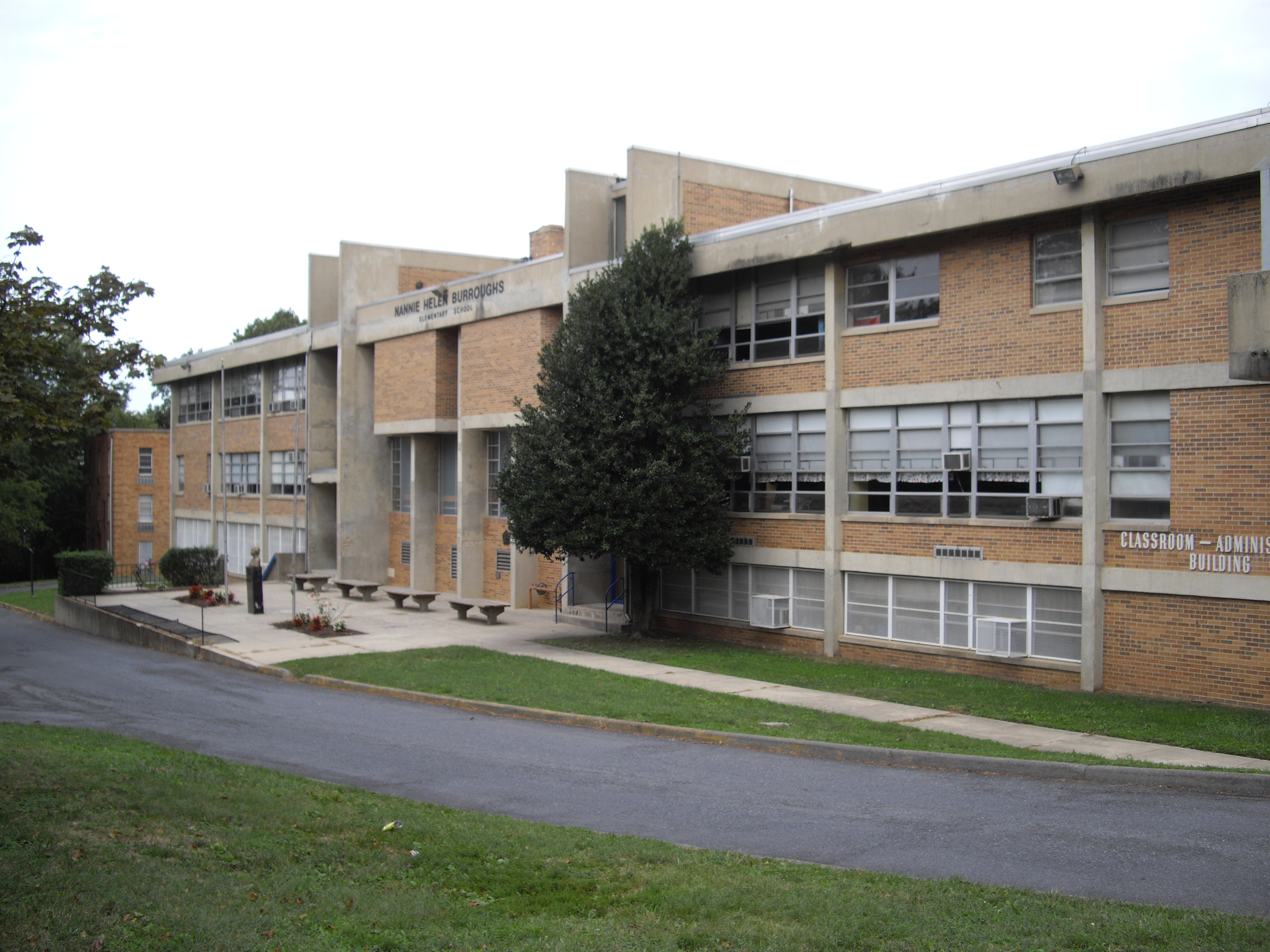
The 1971 school building

The largest building in the group is a school building built in 1971 that now houses the Monroe School. The Trades Hall now houses the offices of the Progressive Baptist National Conference. It is a two-story brick building, set into the hillside so that it presents two stories in front and one in the rear. It is finished in light brick trimmed with dark brick. A string course of soldier bricks separates the floors. The building was constructed in 1927-28, and Mary McLeod Bethune was the featured speaker at its dedication.

== History ==
In 1908 Nannie Helen Burroughs established the National Trade and Professional School for Women and Girls, one of the nation's first vocational training school for African-American girls and women. The school formally opened on October 19, 1909. Its motto was "We specialize in the wholly impossible."

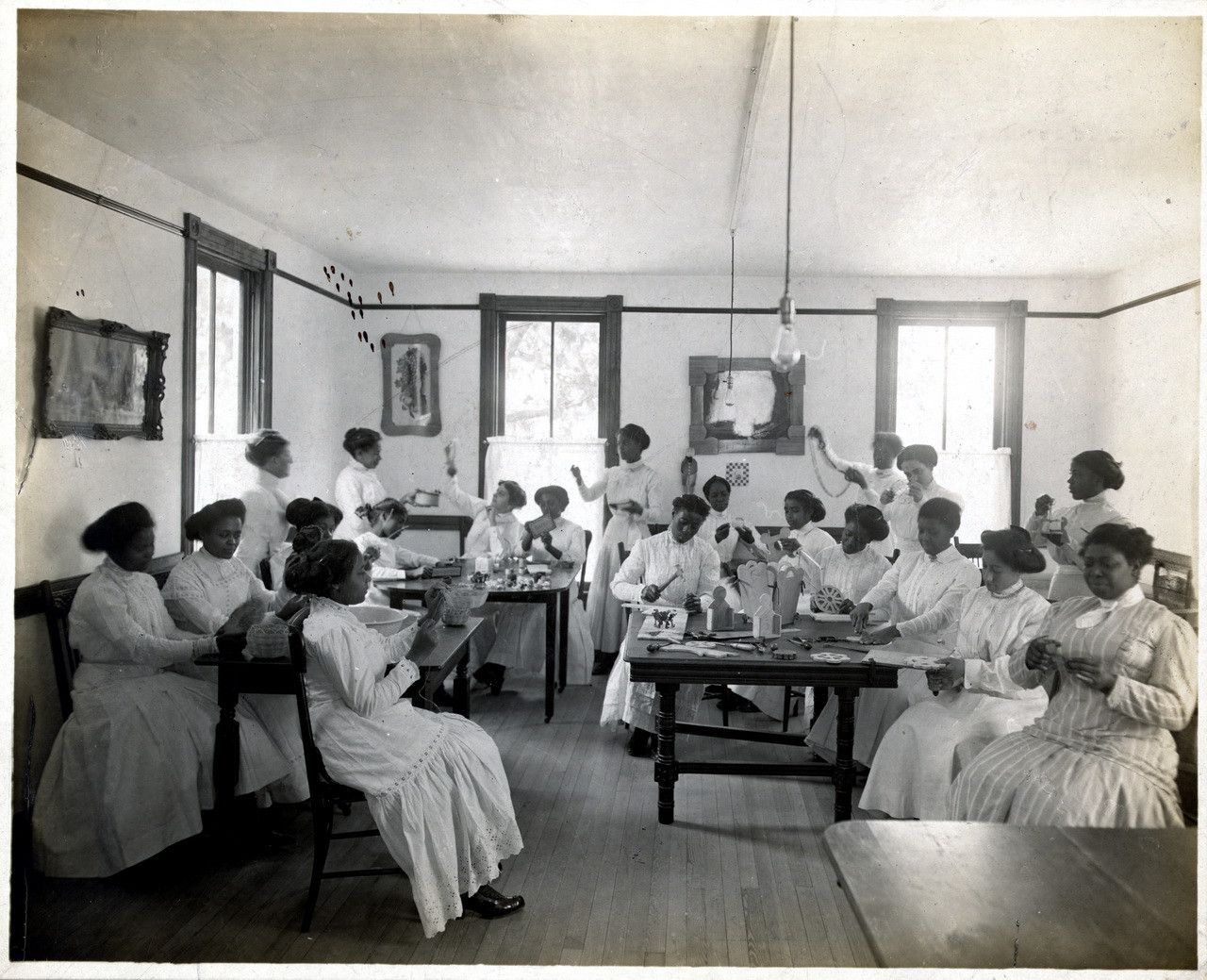
:A vocational class at the school (before 1930).

The school offered training in domestic arts and various vocations, and also gave religious instruction. It was the first school to offer all of these services in a single facility. It was also distinguished in having a stronger academic component than other period schools for African Americans, which generally focused on vocational training. It was supported by the National Baptist Convention and funded and managed entirely by African-Americans. The school attracted students from nearly every state, Puerto Rico, Haiti, and as far away as South America and Africa.

The school expanded its offerings in the 1920s, providing a wider array of vocational skills training. It closed briefly in 1953, but resumed operation. Nannie Helen Burroughs ran the school until her death in 1961, and in 1964 it was renamed in her honor. Today, her legacy is continued by The Monroe School, Inc., which operates in a 1971 school building on the campus. The Trade School building, which was the school's main building for many years, now houses the offices of the Progressive National Baptist Convention.

== Alumni ==
Notable alumni include:

- Agnes Nebo von Ballmoos – Liberian professor of music, scholar of Liberian folk music, conductor, composer, and lawyer
- Ethel Moses – actress and dancer
- Sue Bailey Thurman – author, lecturer, historian and civil rights activist
- Samira Wiley - actress

== See also ==
- List of National Historic Landmarks in Washington, D.C.
- National Register of Historic Places listings in Northeast Quadrant, Washington, D.C.
