= Both Your Houses =

- Written by: Maxwell Anderson
- Original language: English
- Genre: Drama
- Setting: Cannon House Office Building, Washington, D.C.

Premiere
- Date premiered: March 6, 1933
- Place premiered: Royale Theatre; New York City, New York

Both Your Houses is a 1933 play written by American playwright Maxwell Anderson. It was produced by the Theatre Guild and staged by Worthington Miner with scenic design by Arthur P. Segal. It opened at the Royale Theatre on March 5, 1933 and ran for 72 performances closing May 6, 1933. It was awarded the 1933 Pulitzer Prize for Drama, and included in Burns Mantle's The Best Plays of 1932–1933.

The title is an allusion to Mercutio's line "a plague on both your houses" in Romeo and Juliet.

== Plot ==
A magnificent ironic comedy, and a daring and forthright commentary on national politics. Here we have the story of a hard-fighting young and idealistic Congressman suddenly up against a group of old-time politicians, all at work on a big appropriations bill. The young idealist tries to draw up a relatively honest bill, but realizing that the fight seems hopeless, he turns around and makes the bill so ridiculously dishonest that he can only imagine it will be instantly killed. However, it is so pleasing to all parties that it goes through both Houses.

== Reception ==
Reviewing a 1992 production, Variety described Houses as reminiscent of — but "far more bleak and despairing than" — Mr. Smith Goes to Washington and Born Yesterday, calling it "bitter" and "cynical", and assessing the play's message as "heavy-handed" and its characters as "tend(ing) to two-dimensionality."

== Cast ==
- Morris Carnovsky as Levering
- Russell Collins as Peebles
- Mary Philips as Bus
- J. Edward Bromberg as Wingblatt
- Jerome Cowan as Sneden
- Aleta Freel as Marjorie Gray
- Walter C. Kelly as Solomon Fitzmaurice
- Oscar Polk as Mark
- Robert Shayne as Eddie Wister
- Shepperd Strudwick as Alan McClean
- Joseph Sweeney as Ebner
- John Butler as Merton
- William Foran as Dell
- John F. Morrissey as Farnum
- Jane Seymour as Miss McMurty
- Robert Strange as Simeon Gray
