= Temptation (1935 film) =

US 1935 film

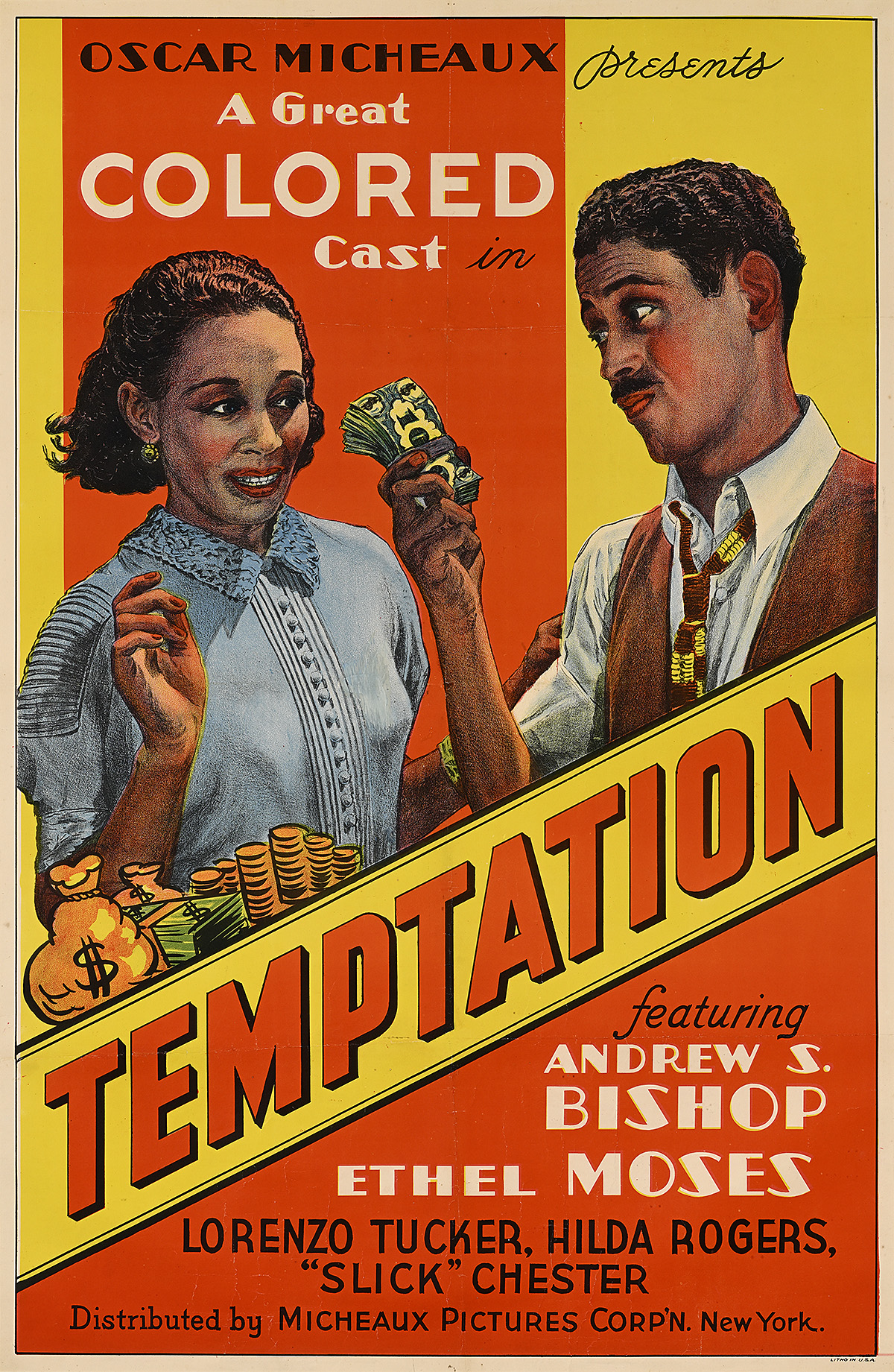
- One of several posters for the film
- Directed by: Oscar Micheaux
- Written by: Oscar Micheaux
- Produced by: Oscar Micheaux
- Starring: Andrew S. Bishop; Ethel Moses
- Production company: Micheaux Film
- Release date: January 1, 1935
- Country: United States
- Language: English
- Budget: $15,000

Tempation is a 1935 American crime film written, produced and directed by Oscar Micheaux. The storyline depicts the corrupting influence of carnal desires. It is considered a lost film.

The National Museum of African American History and Culture has a lobby card for the film advertising "a great colored cast". Ethel Moses made her film debut as a naive woman who models nude and struggles to fend off opportunistic men while becoming part of a criminal underworld. The film made her a fully fledged star.

== Cast ==
The film was directed by Oscar Micheaux and distributed by the Micheaux Film and Book Company.

Actors in the film include:

- Andrew S. Bishop
- Ethel Moses
- Lorenzo Tucker
- Vincente Minnelli
- Alfred "Slick" Chester
- Dorothy Van Engle
