= Agnes Nebo von Ballmoos =

Liberian academic and musician

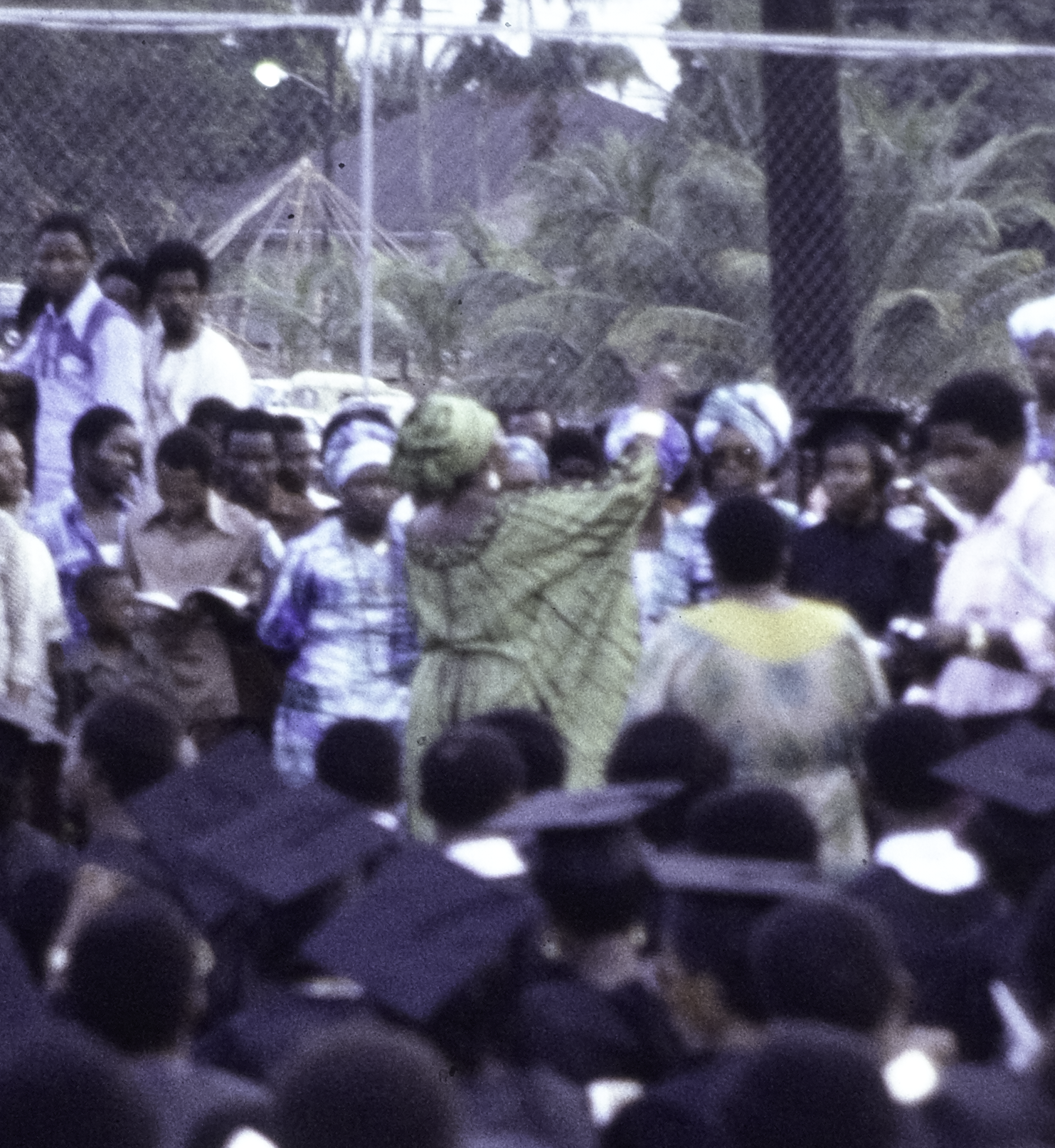
- Agnes Nebo von Ballmoos conducting the Choir of the University of Liberia, 1978
- Born: Agnes Nebo; February 21, 1938; Grand Cess, Grand Kru County, Liberia
- Died: March 29, 2000 (aged 62); London
- Education: Philadelphia Conservatory of Music; Indiana University
- Occupations: Ethnomusicologist; Conductor; Composer; Academic; Lawyer
- Organizations: University of Liberia
- Known for: Studies of Liberian folk music

Agnes Nebo von Ballmoos is conducting a choir of male and female students at a Graduation Ceremony. University of Liberia, Monrovia, 1978.

Agnes Nebo von Ballmoos (February 21, 1938 – March 29, 2000) was a Liberian professor of music, scholar of Liberian folk music, conductor, composer, and lawyer. Von Ballmoos contributed to the preservation of Liberian folk music by collecting and transcribing folk music representing diverse cultural traditions around the country and composing original arrangements of traditional songs. She also taught at the University of Liberia for nearly thirty years, directing the university choir. Under her leadership, the choir gave concerts at venues around the world, performing a varied repertoire which included classical pieces, spirituals, and traditional Liberian music.

== Early life and education ==
Agnes Nebo von Ballmoos was born in Grand Cess in Grand Kru County. Her father was Amos S. Nebo and her mother was Grace Nah Tameh Nebo. As a child, she attended the Bible Industrial Academy in Grand Bassa County and Suehn Mission School in Bomi County. She received a scholarship for academic excellence to complete her high school studies at Nannie Helen Burroughs School in Washington, D.C.

Von Ballmoos received an undergraduate degree in piano performance in 1959 from the Philadelphia Conservatory of Music. In 1975, she completed a master's degree in ethnomusicology from Indiana University, which she attended on a Fulbright fellowship. Her master's thesis examined the social role of folk songs in Liberia.

Shortly after completing her undergraduate degree, Agnes married Rudolph von Ballmoos, with whom she had two sons. Their elder son, also named Rudolph, served as Liberia's ambassador to the United Kingdom. Their younger son, DeWitt von Ballmoos, leads Liberia's National Social Security and Welfare Corporation.

== Career ==
From 1961 to 1990, von Ballmoos taught music at the University of Liberia, where she was a founding member of the music program. She also conducted the University of Liberia choir. Von Ballmoos introduced traditional Liberian music into the choir's repertoire for the first time. "Our research began in 1966 with the arrangement of seven songs performed by the University of Liberia choir--the very first time in our history of indigenous songs being performed by our highest institution. The idea thrilled the entire community and we received encouraging letters of congratulations and compliments," she wrote.

Under her direction, the choir gained international attention for its performances, which included a mixture of classical music, African-American spirituals, and traditional Liberian songs. The group gave concerts around the world, including a 1974 performance at an international choral festival at Lincoln Center for the Performing Arts in New York City. It was the only group representing an African country to participate in the festival.

Von Ballmoos preserved, transcribed, and recorded folk music from across Liberia's diverse cultural traditions. She was a pioneer in the transcription of Liberian folk songs into written form. She also created original arrangements of traditional songs.

In 1989, von Ballmoos received a Bachelor of Laws degree from the University of Liberia and became a lawyer at a Monrovia law firm. To escape the First Liberian Civil War, she moved to London in 1990. There, she worked as a legal consultant. She died in London in 2000.

== Legacy ==
The University of Liberia Alumni Chorus, founded in 2009, performs an annual concert in the United States to celebrate von Ballmoos' legacy and raise money for the music department at the University of Liberia. The 2019 performance took place in Battell Chapel at Yale University.

Alumni of the chorus remember von Ballmoos as a leader who expected excellence and who "taught us everything ... she taught us to appreciate music, she taught us to appreciate African culture, how to dress, how wrap our hair, how to conduct ourselves in public." Alumni of the chorus credit the discipline and commitment that she instilled with helping them survive during the civil war.

Von Ballmoos' work also significantly contributed to the preservation of Liberian folk music. In the 1960s and 1970s, when von Ballmoos began her career, traditional music was not highly valued. Her efforts helped increase appreciation of traditional music and culture.

== Publications ==
- The Collection, Notation and Arrangement of Liberian Folk Songs,
  - Journal of the New African Literature and the Arts, Spring/ Fall 1969, pp. 111–118.
  - Pan-African Cultural Festival, First, of Royal Anthropological Institute. Archives and Manuscripts (1969), [Addresses and papers]. Algiers, The Organization of African Unity, 21 July – 1 Aug. 1969, Papers read at the Symposium of the First Pan-African Cultural Festival, 8 pages.
- The Role of Folksongs in Liberian Society (thesis, Indiana University), Bloomington 1975, 406 pages.
