= Oscar Polk =

American actor

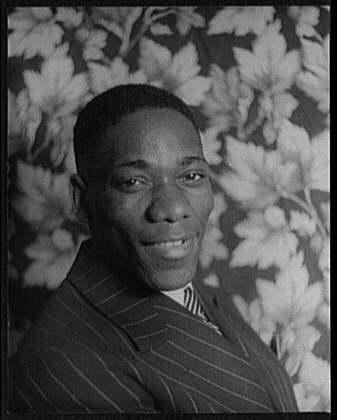
- Portrait of Oscar Polk by Carl Van Vechten, Jan. 24, 1937
- Born: December 25, 1899; Marianna, Arkansas, U.S.
- Died: January 4, 1949 (aged 49); New York City, U.S.
- Occupation: Actor
- Years active: 1927–1946

Oscar Polk (December 25, 1899 – January 4, 1949) was an American actor. He portrayed the enslaved man Pork in the film Gone with the Wind (1939).

== Life and career ==
His most memorable scene in that film comes when Pork discloses to Scarlett O'Hara, portrayed by Vivien Leigh, that the back property taxes “done run up sky high” on Tara in the amount of $300.

Polk was married to Ivy V. Polk (née Ivy Parsons, born October 12, 1920, deceased September 2026), who herself had a deleted scene in Gone with the Wind. They had a son, Oscar Polk Jr.

On January 4, 1949, Oscar Polk was fatally struck by a taxi cab as he stepped off a curb in Times Square in New York City 10 days after his 49th birthday. At the time of his death, he was scheduled to have a major role in the play Leading Lady, and he was replaced by Ossie Davis. He is buried at Mount Olivet Cemetery in Long Island, New York.

== Theatre credits ==
=== Broadway ===
- The Trial of Mary Dugan (1927)
- Once in a Lifetime (1930)
- Both Your Houses (1933)
- The Green Pastures (1935)
- You Can't Take It with You (1936)
- Swingin' The Dream (1939), a swing music adaptation of A Midsummer Night's Dream.
- Sunny River (1942)
- The Walking Gentleman (1942)
- Dark Eyes (1943)

=== Other stage credits ===
- Horses Are Like That (1943)
- Bigger Than Barnum (1946)
- The Magnificent Heel (1946)

== Filmography ==
Year	Title	Role	Notes
1935	It's a Great Life	Lazy Bones	
1936	The Green Pastures	Gabriel	
1937	Underworld	Sam Brown	
1938	Out of the Inkwell	Janitor	Uncredited
1939	Big Town Czar	Arthur, Harlem Numbers Man	Uncredited
1939	Gone with the Wind	Pork - House Servant	
1940	The Notorious Elinor Lee	Blakely	
1941	Birth of the Blues	Man in Jail	Uncredited
1942	Reap the Wild Wind	Salt Meat	
1942	White Cargo	Umeela	
1943	Cabin in the Sky	The Deacon / Fleetfoot	
