= Murder in Harlem =

1935 film by Clarence Williams, Oscar Micheaux

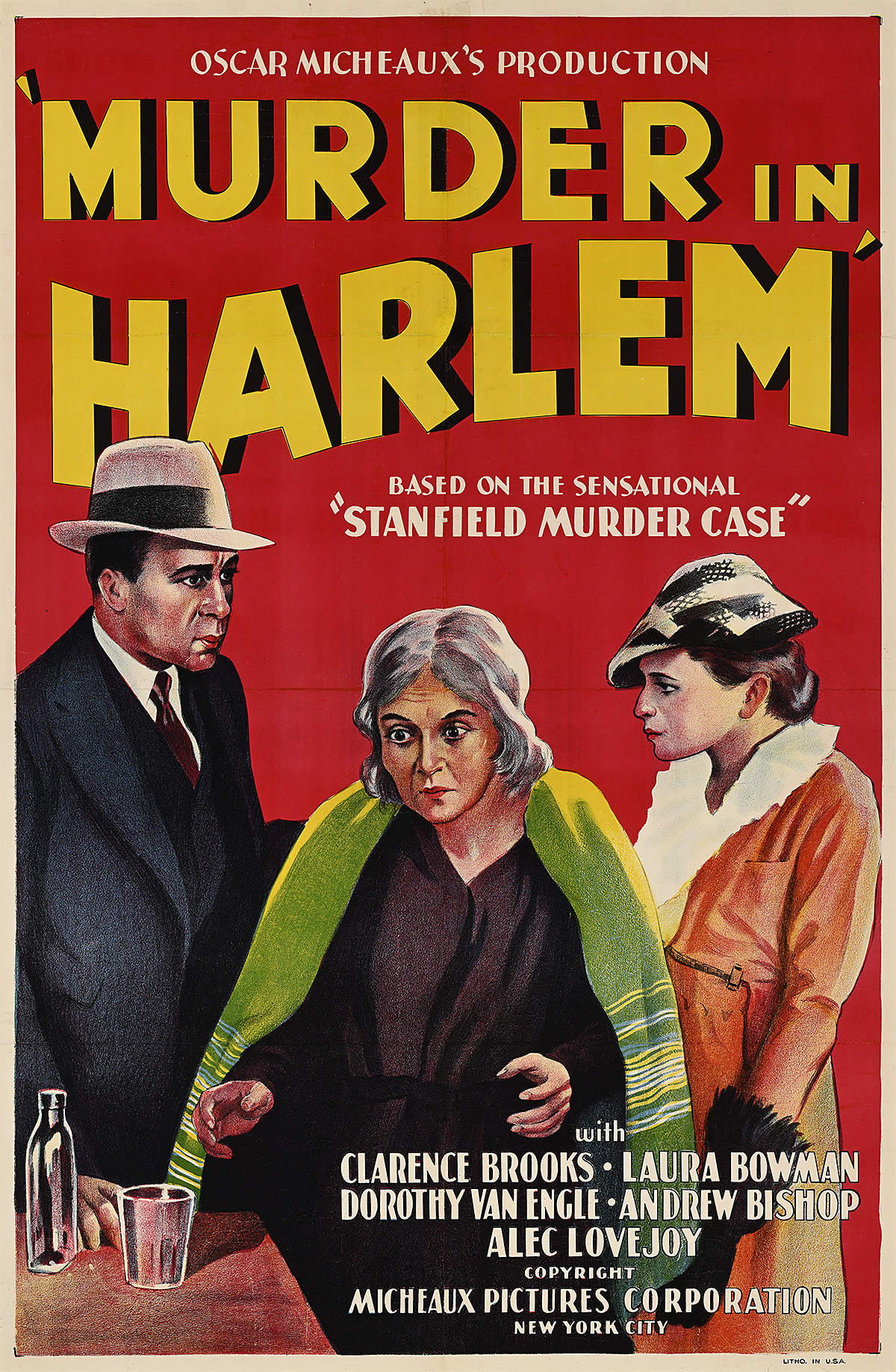
- Film poster for 1935 theatrical release
- Directed by: Oscar Micheaux; Clarence Williams (cabaret sequence) (uncredited)
- Written by: Oscar Micheaux (novel The Story of Dorothy Stanfield); Oscar Micheaux (screenplay); Clarence Williams (cabaret sequence) (uncredited)
- Produced by: Alice B. Russell (producer); Oscar Micheaux (producer) (uncredited)
- Starring: See below
- Cinematography: Charles Levine
- Release date: 1935
- Running time: 102 minutes
- Country: United States
- Language: English

Murder in Harlem (also released as Lem Hawkins Confession and Brand of Cain) is a 1935 American race film written, produced and directed by Oscar Micheaux, who also appears in the film. It is a remake of his 1921 silent film The Gunsaulus Mystery.

Basing the works on the 1913 trial of Leo Frank for the murder of Mary Phagan, Micheaux used the detective genre to introduce different voices and conflicting accounts by his characters. In July 2021, the film was shown in the Cannes Classics section at the 2021 Cannes Film Festival.

== Plot ==
An African-American man is framed for the murder of a white woman, but a white man is responsible. Author-turned-attorney Henry Glory is hired by the accused man's sister to defend him. Glory pieces the crime together, and the white killer is revealed. The film is loosely based on the real life case of Leo Frank. However, it changes the details of the real case, which was highly prejudicial against Frank due to his being a Jewish man in Georgia. Unlike in the film, Frank's guilt is often viewed with great skepticism due to his never receiving a fair trial.

== Cast ==
- Clarence Brooks as Henry Glory
- Dorothy Van Engle as Claudia Vance
- Andrew S. Bishop as Anthony Brisbane
- Alec Lovejoy as Lem Hawkins
- Laura Bowman as Mrs. Epps
- Bee Freeman as The Catbird
- Alice B. Russell as Mrs. Vance
- Eunice Wilson as Singer
- Lorenzo McClane as Arthur Vance
- David Hanna as Undetermined Role
- "Slick" Chester as Detective

== Soundtrack ==
- "Harlem Rhythm Dance" (Music and lyrics by Clarence Williams)
- "Ants in My Pants" (Music and lyrics by Clarence Williams)

== See also ==
- List of films in the public domain in the United States
