= God's Step Children =

1938 film by Oscar Micheaux

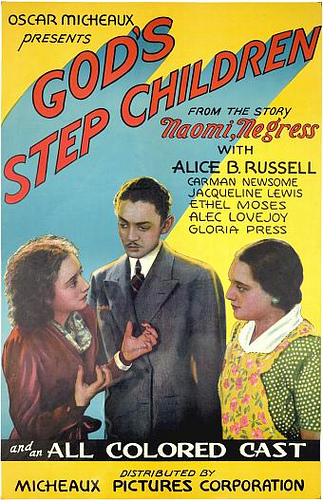
- Film poster
- Directed by: Oscar Micheaux
- Written by: Alice B. Russell; Oscar Micheaux
- Produced by: Oscar Micheaux
- Starring: Jacqueline Lewis; Ethel Moses; Alice B. Russell; Carman Newsome; Gloria Press; Cherokee Thornton; Dorothy Van Engle
- Cinematography: Lester Lang
- Edited by: Patricia Rooney; Leonard Weiss
- Distributed by: Micheaux Pictures Corporation
- Release date: 1938
- Running time: 70 minutes (recovered edited version)
- Country: United States
- Language: English

God's Step Children is a 1938 American drama film directed by Oscar Micheaux. The film is inspired by a combination of elements shared from two previously released Hollywood productions, Imitation of Life and These Three.

== Plot ==
A young black woman arrives at the home of Mrs. Saunders, a widow who is black, and begs her to look after her light-skinned baby, whom she cannot afford to feed. At first she says this is temporary while she looks for work, but leaves declaring she will never be back. Mrs. Saunders pledges to raise the child as her own, along with her own son Jimmie. She names the child Naomi.

Nine years later, schoolgirl Naomi is thought by the other black children to be aloof and they accuse the light-complexioned child of not wanting to be black. This looks true the day Naomi disappears on her way to school and Jimmie tells his mother that Naomi deliberately avoided the black school she was supposed to attend and instead went to a white school. Naomi denies Jimmie's accusation, saying he's lying because he hates girls. When Mrs. Cushinberry threatens to punish her for being insolent and mean, Naomi furiously explodes that she hates her and the other children and that she only came to the school because her mother sent her there. She spits in the teacher's face which results in Mrs. Cushinberry spanking her.

That evening, Mrs. Cushinberry visits Mrs. Saunders, but when she realizes that Naomi didn't tell her mother what happened that afternoon, she decides to keep silent. But Naomi has been eavesdropping, and when the teacher leaves she starts to tell her mother that the teacher was the one at fault. Then Jimmie reveals the truth: Naomi was spanked at school for being unruly and then spitting in the teacher's face. Mrs. Saunders spanks Naomi herself. Later, Naomi starts a rumor that Mrs. Cushinberry is having an affair with a married professor; soon a riot erupts at school and a crowd of angry parents marches to the school superintendent's house to demand that he fire both teachers. When Jimmie tells Mrs. Saunders about the riot, she rushes to the superintendent's office to dispel the rumor Naomi started. Because of this, Naomi is soon sent to a convent.

About ten to twelve years later Jimmie, a young man now, has earned $6,700 as a Pullman porter when he is approached by Ontrue Cowper, a gambler, who tries to interest him in investing in the numbers racket. Jimmie rejects this offer, investing in a farm instead. After proposing to his sweetheart Eva, Jimmie invites his mother to live on his new farm. Naomi returns to town, reformed by her life at the convent, and apologizes to her mother for having been a bad child. When Jimmie and Naomi are reunited, the scene implies Naomi's romantic attachment towards him. Mrs. Saunders arranges to have Jimmie take Naomi to see the city. Although things go well, Eva's Aunt Carrie doesn't trust Naomi's unnatural interest in Jimmie and believes that she should be watched.

Aunt Carrie’s suspicions prove to be well-founded as Naomi soon confesses her love for her adoptive brother. When Jimmie, Eva, and Naomi return to the country, Jimmie introduces Naomi to his friend, Clyde Wade, who immediately falls in love with her. Clyde is a dark-skinned African American with a country accent. Naomi finds him repulsive and confesses to Jimmie that she has always wanted him to marry her. Realizing that Eva would be crushed by the loss of Jimmie, Naomi consents to marry Clyde.

One year later, Naomi visits her mother with her and Clyde's baby boy in her arms, declaring that she is leaving Clyde as she never loved him and “leaving the Negro race" to live a new life as a white woman. In a full circle moment paralleling the start of the movie with her own biological mother, Naomi leaves her son with Mrs. Saunders and disappears. A few years after that, Naomi returns to the farm one night and silently creeps up to the window, through which she sees a happy family scene that will never include her.

Afterwards, Naomi rushes off to a bridge and jumps from it into a river below to drown herself with a Biblical quote from Galatians displayed: "As ye sow, so shall ye reap", as her hat floats down the stream.

== Cast ==
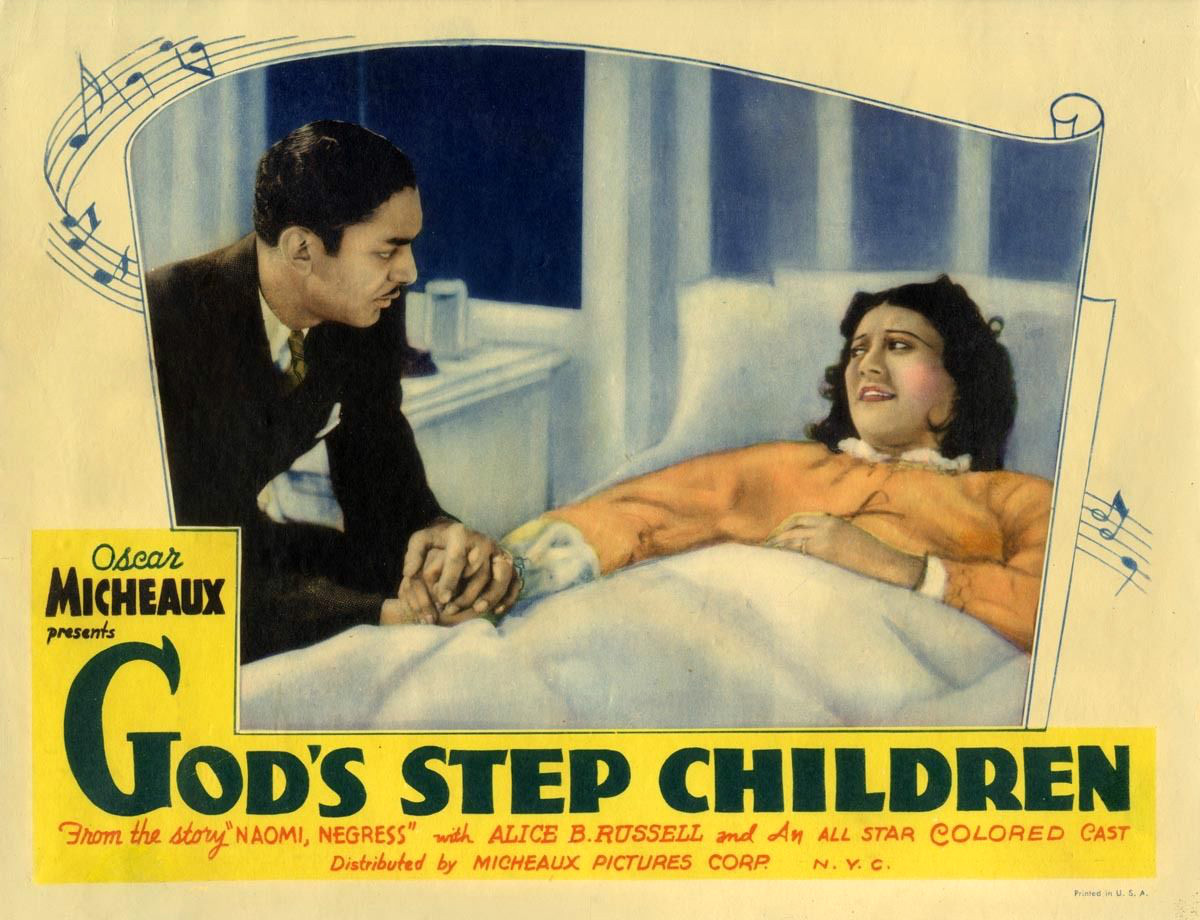
Lobby card

- Jacqueline Lewis as Naomi, as a Child
- Ethel Moses as Mrs. Cushinberry / Her Daughter Eva
- Alice B. Russell as Mrs. Saunders
- Dorothy Van Engle as Naomi's mother (uncredited)
- Trixie Smith as A Visitor (deleted scene; featured in trailer)
- Charles Thompson as Jimmie, as a Child
- Carman Newsome as Jimmie, as an Adult
- Gloria Press as Naomi, as an Adult
- Alec Lovejoy as Ontrue Cowper, a Gambler
- Columbus Jackson as Cowper's Associate
- Laura Bowman as Aunt Carrie
- Cherokee Thornton as Clyde Wade (uncredited)
- Sam Patterson as A Banker
- Charles R. Moore as School Superintendent
- Consuelo Harris as Muscle Dancer
- Sammy Gardiner as Tap Dancer
- Leon Gross as Orchestra Leader
- Dolly Jones, dancing as an extra

== Production ==
The American Film Institute's catalog reports that some original material was removed from the film after censors raised objections. Some of the excised scenes featured more insight into child Naomi's hatred toward black people and her desire to be white. Other footage includes adult Naomi with a white husband after she tries to pass as white (at the film's climax), only to be rejected by him when he learns of her black heritage. However, some of the removed footage may still be seen in the film's opening preview trailer.

The film's script is based on a short treatment titled "Naomi Negress!" written by Alice B. Russell, the wife of director Oscar Micheaux who plays Mrs. Saunders.

== Censorship ==
Before God's Step Children could be exhibited in Kansas, the Kansas Board of Review required the elimination of a solo dance by black girl and a full ballet scene.

== Critical debate ==
God's Step Children has been hailed as a masterpiece and denounced as stereotypical and racially denigrating. Protests at the time of the film's release apparently targeted scenes and dialogue in which Micheaux repeated his long-standing criticisms of his race, charging it with a lack of ambition and an inability to plan. As in previous Micheaux films, God's Step Children seems to repeat the same bias in favor of light-skinned blacks that it also attempts to critique. The "bad" blacks, such as the gamblers, are dark-complexioned. Clyde, whom Naomi rejects, is also dark and speaks in a buffoonish country accent. The film does not engage timely sociopolitical issues as forcefully as did earlier Micheaux films such as Within Our Gates or Symbol of the Unconquered.

== Restoration ==
In 2022, God's Step Children was one of a few Oscar Micheaux productions to get this treatment by the film company Kino Lorber. A special version was released in 2024 with a cleaner and brighter cinematography including new opening titles and in-movie title cards. The movie's opening preview trailer was removed but with all those snippets spliced in the movie in attempt to extend it as close to the original version was possible, but those full scenes still remain missing. A new never-before-seen snippet scene is featured with adult Naomi and her white husband Andrew that has been lost, even from the edited version's preview trailer as a part of the scene has the preview wordings on display - showing it was originally part of the trailer.

This version can be seen currently on YouTube.
