= The Mohican's Daughter =

1922 film

- Directed by: Sam Taylor; Stanner E.V. Taylor
- Written by: Stanner E.V. Taylor
- Based on: The Story of Jees Uck by Jack London
- Starring: Nancy Deaver; William H. Thompson; Paul Panzer
- Cinematography: Lester Lang; Oliver T. Marsh
- Production company: P.T.B. Inc.
- Distributed by: American Releasing Corporation
- Release date: October 1, 1922
- Running time: 50 minutes
- Country: United States
- Languages: Silent; English intertitles

The Mohican's Daughter is a 1922 American silent romantic drama film directed by Sam Taylor and Stanner E.V. Taylor and starring Nancy Deaver, William H. Thompson and Paul Panzer. It is based on the 1904 short story The Story of Jees Uck by Jack London,

== Cast ==
- Nancy Deaver as Jees Uck
- Hazel Washburn as Kitty Shannon
- Sazon King as Neil Bonner
- William H. Thompson as Amos Pentley
- Jack Newton as Jack Hollis
- Paul Panzer as Father La Claire
- Nick Thompson as Chatanna
- Mortimer Snow as Nashinta
- John Webb Dillion as A Halfbreed
- Myrtle Morse as Inigo, his wife
- Rita Abrams as Their child

== Preservation ==
With no holdings located in archives, The Mohican's Daughter is considered a lost film.

== Bibliography ==
- Connelly, Robert B. The Silents: Silent Feature Films, 1910-36, Volume 40, Issue 2. December Press, 1998.
- Munden, Kenneth White. The American Film Institute Catalog of Motion Pictures Produced in the United States, Part 1. University of California Press, 1997.
