= Underworld (1937 film) =

1937 film by Oscar Micheaux

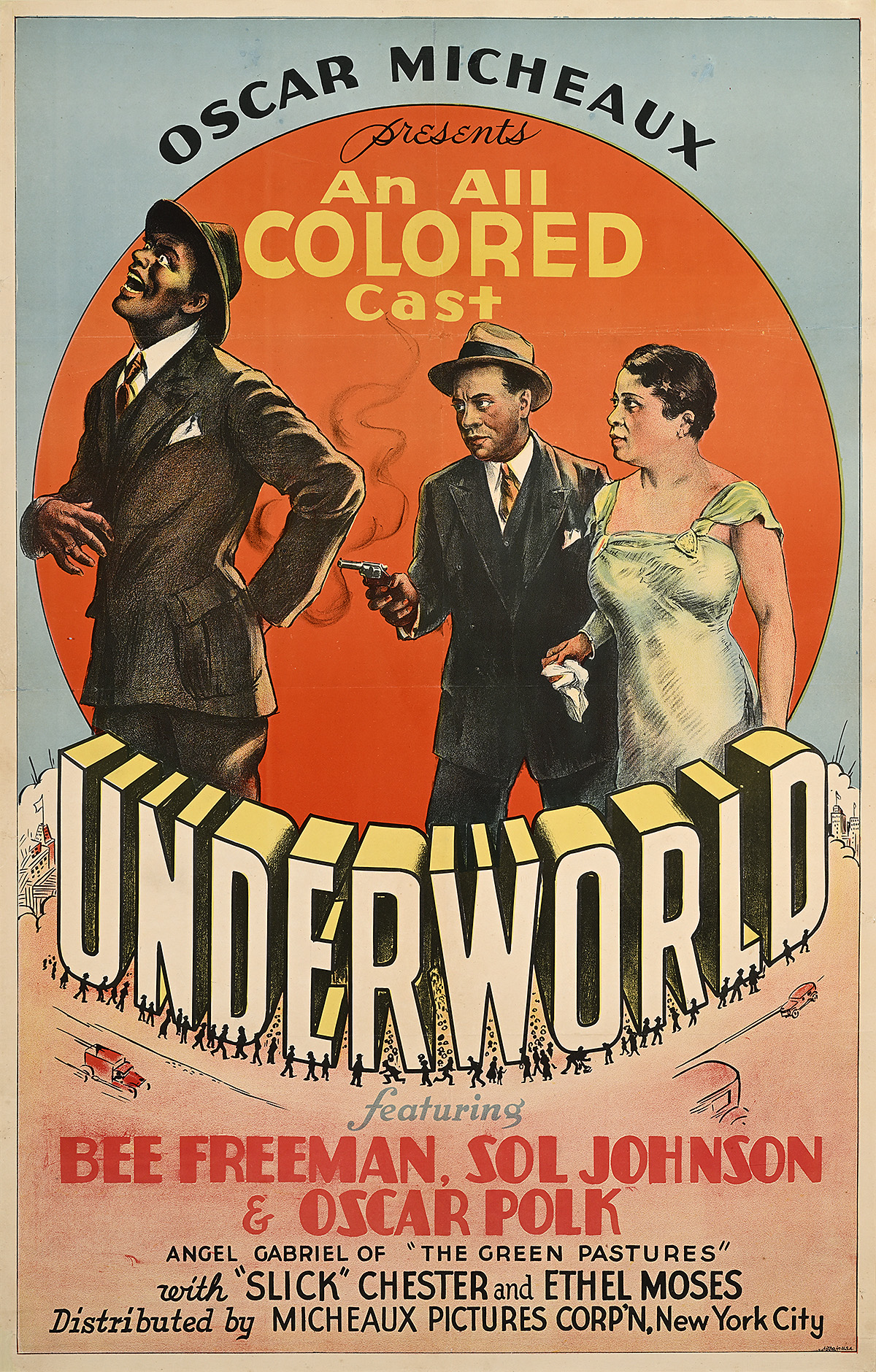
- Underworld title screen
- Directed by: Oscar Micheaux
- Based on: "Chicago After Midnight" by Edna Mae Baker
- Produced by: Oscar Micheaux
- Starring: Sol Johnson, Bee Freeman, Oscar Polk
- Cinematography: Lester Lang
- Edited by: Nathan Cy Braunstein
- Production company: Micheaux Pictures Corp
- Distributed by: Sack Amusement Enterprises
- Release dates: September 30, 1937 (Harlem Opera House, New York, NY)
- Running time: 70 minutes
- Country: United States
- Language: English

Underworld is a 1937 gangster film directed by Oscar Micheaux, about a recent graduate from an all-black college who moves from the American South to Chicago and gets swept into the criminal underworld. The film was adapted from the short story "Chicago After Midnight" by Edna Mae Baker. Among its stars are Ethel Moses, a Micheaux regular, and Oscar Polk, best known for his appearance in Gone with the Wind two years later.

== Plot ==
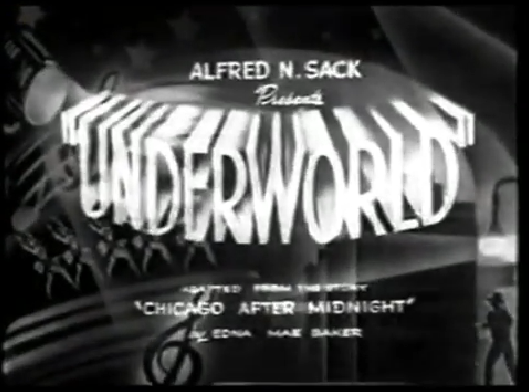
Title screen

The film opens at an all-black college somewhere in the Southern United States. Paul Bronson, a recent graduate, is convinced by gambler LeRoy Giles to join him in Chicago. There, Paul becomes involved with Dinah Jackson, a singer who is married to club owner Sam Brown but has been having an affair with LeRoy. Paul runs into Evelyn Martin, a beauty parlor owner, who recognizes him from college. The two have lunch together, during which LeRoy spots them and reports to Dinah that Paul is seeing someone else. Dinah arranges for LeRoy to drug and rob Paul. LeRoy also kills Sam and leaves the gun by his body. Paul finds the body; as he picks up the gun, Dinah enters and accuses Paul of killing Sam. Eventually, Dinah reports Paul to the police for the murder; she then goes on a bender and dies when her car is hit by a train. It seems that Paul will be found guilty of Sam's murder, until, at the last moment, a Chinese man named Ching Li comes forward as an eyewitness. Paul is freed and reunited with Evelyn. The two plan to travel by train to Oklahoma to start over together.

== Cast ==
- Bee Freeman as Dinah Jackson
- Sol Johnson as Paul Bronson
- 'Slick' Chester as LeRoy Giles
- Ethel Moses as Evelyn Martin
- Oscar Polk as Sam Brown
- Larry Seymour as Tim Sharkey
- Lorenzo Tucker
- Clara Bell Powell

== Production ==
On November 14, 1936, the Motion Picture Herald reported that Ideal Sound Studios in North Bergen, New Jersey had been reopened for Oscar Micheaux to make four films. The notice mentioned that "a company of 20 actors, including Oscar Folk [sic]... are now employed."

== Censorship ==
Records from the Production Code Administration show that numerous deletions were requested in order for the film to be shown in various states. For New York, the MPPDA required the words "chippy" and "broad" to be deleted; for Maryland, requested deletions included the word "hell" and shots and sounds relating to the murder of Big Sam. Ohio rejected the film entirely.

== Themes ==
According to Barbara Tepa Lupack, Underworld features at least two elements that are common to Micheaux's films. The first is the "surprise revelation of guilt or innocence." The second is the recurring motif of the train that serves as "both the method of Dinah's punishment and the means by which Paul and Evelyn can begin their new life together in Oklahoma."

== Songs ==
- "It Don't Mean a Thing," music by Duke Ellington, lyrics by Irving Mills
- "I'll Never Say 'Never Again' Again," music and lyrics by Harry Woods
