= Tall, Tan, and Terrific =

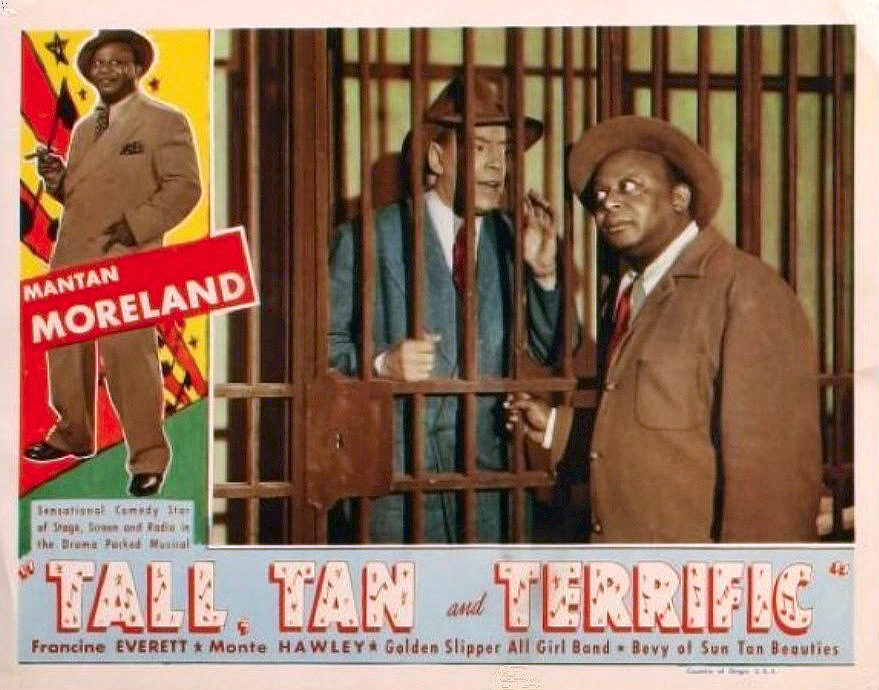
- Lobby card
- Directed by: Bud Pollard
- Written by: John E. Gordon
- Produced by: Bud Pollard; Robert M. Savini
- Starring: Mantan Moreland
- Cinematography: Jack Etra
- Edited by: Bud Pollard; Shirley Stone
- Music by: Gene Roland
- Distributed by: Astor Pictures
- Release date: 1946
- Running time: 42 minutes
- Country: United States
- Language: English

Tall, Tan, and Terrific is a 1946 American film directed by Bud Pollard and starring Mantan Moreland.

== Premise ==
A musical comedy set at Harlem's Golden Slipper Club, it features efforts to free someone accused of murder.

== Cast ==
- Mantan Moreland as Mantan Moreland
- Monte Hawley as "Handsome" Harry Hansom
- Francine Everett as Miss Tall, Tan and Terrific
- Dots Johnson as The Duke
- Rudy Toombs as Lefty Gomez
- Barbara "Butterbeans" Bradford as Club photographer
- Lou Swarz
