= Out of the Inkwell (1938 film) =

- Directed by: Dave Fleischer; Animated Sequences: Thomas Johnson
- Produced by: Max Fleischer; S. Roy Luby (associate)
- Starring: Bonnie Poe as Betty Boop (voice - uncredited); Oscar Polk as a black janitor (uncredited)
- Cinematography: Sid Glenar
- Animation by: Thomas Johnson; Otto Feuer
- Color process: Black and white
- Production company: Fleischer Studios
- Distributed by: Paramount Pictures
- Release date: April 22, 1938
- Running time: 7 minutes
- Country: United States
- Language: English

Out of the Inkwell is a 1938 Max Fleischer/Betty Boop live-action and animated short film. The title and concept for the film were a tribute to the Out of the Inkwell series of films that Max Fleischer had produced during the 1920s.

== Synopsis ==
A live-action black janitor, played by Oscar Polk, best known for his portrayal as the servant "Pork" in the 1939 film Gone with the Wind, studies hypnotism from a book while cleaning Max Fleischer's desk at the Fleischer studio. He manages to conjure Max's pen into drawing Betty Boop. In a sequence of animation mixed with live-action, he uses his new powers to control the white animated Boop. She in turn is able to control a small dog. After waking from the spell, Betty manages to work a few more spells. Fraught with racial innuendo, one of her tricks includes turning the black man white for a split-second, after which he begins cleaning in overdrive. Before that, he was sleeping on his broom and sweeping dirt under the carpet. At the end, Betty Boop leaps into a bottle of black ink.

== Reception ==
Boxoffice (March 24, 1938): "Mostly juvenile appeal. That popular Max Fleischer animated stunt is used here, but their results are far from effective. There is a colored porter, who picks up hypnotism from a book lying on a cartoonist's desk. He brings the pen to life with an unaided drawing of Betty Boop. Betty watches the porter tire at his work and then hypnotized him into doing the work at a speedy clip."

Motion Picture Exhibitor (May 1, 1938): "The Boops will not be distributed by Paramount next year. This entrant will do nothing to make any exhibitor regret the company's decision. It has novelty, true, but of the old days."
