= Dorothy Van Engle =

American actress and model (1910–2004)

- Born: Donessa Dorothy Van Engle; August 14, 1910; Harlem, New York, US
- Died: May 10, 2004 (aged 93); Ocala, Florida, US
- Other names: Donessa Dorothy Hollon
- Occupations: Actress; model; seamstress
- Years active: 1932–1939
- Employer: Oscar Micheaux
- Known for: Starring in Murder in Harlem and Swing!
- Spouse: Herbert Hollon
- Children: 2

Dorothy Van Engle (August 14, 1910 – May 10, 2004) was an American actress who performed throughout the 1930s. She starred in Oscar Micheaux films, including Murder in Harlem and Swing!. Beautiful and sophisticated, she wore fashionable "updos" in her films.

== History ==
=== Early life ===
Born Donessa Dorothy Van Engle in Harlem, New York, on August 14, 1910, she grew up with her mother and stepfather, being influenced by the latter's band and show business activities. It was through these acquaintances that she first met Oscar Micheaux and began starring in his films. Before that point, she had been working as a model and it was through these jobs that she made money, as Micheaux's low budget films never had the money to properly pay the actors. But, in her own words, she stated that she acted for fun and enjoyed the "adventure" such roles gave her. Also working as a seamstress, she made her own costumes for her film roles.

=== Film career ===
Cast as the main female lead in the 1935 film Murder in Harlem, Engle acted as a strong female character who actually solved the private eye's cases rather than the male lead. The film's subject matter and original source events were criticized, however, along with Engle and the other actress's acting in the film, as if their lines were being delivered with an "air of artificiality". In 1938's Swing!, she played the role of an assistant producer to the black male lead who played a producer character and it was her role that was responsible for making the critical show idea that allowed the male lead to be successful in the film. Ohio State University's professor of film studies, J. Ronald Green, described her as one of the few primary women actors cast by Micheaux and she frequently played intelligent and strong-minded characters that acted as a "proto-feminist role" for women at the time. Green further stated that it was these race films that were the sole source of positive representation of black Americans in media during the early half of the 20th century.

== Personal life ==
She married Herbert Hollon and left her acting career behind to start a family as Donessa Dorothy Hollon. She had two sons and several grandchildren. She lived with her husband, a building superintendent, in New York and New Jersey before moving to Florida in 1978. She lived in Port Charlotte and worked at a library after her husband's death in 1992. She spent her final months in Ocala and died at the age of 93.

== Filmography ==
- The Girl from Chicago (1932)
- Harlem After Midnight (1934)
- Murder in Harlem (1935)
- Temptation (1935)
- Swing! (1938) as Lena Powell
- God's Step Children (1938) as Naomi's mother (uncredited)
- Lying Lips (1939)
