= Milton Woods =

African-American actor

Milton Woods was an actor. He was in several films. In 1946, Newsweek described him as the "colored Basil Rathbone". In 1951, Jet reported that he directed of the American Negro Repertory Theater, touring the country in a trailer.

== Filmography ==
- It Happened in Harlem (1945) as Billy Bond
- Big Timers (1945)
- Beware (1946) as Benjamin Ware III
- Reet, Petite, and Gone (1947) as Sam Adams
- Boy! What a Girl! (1947) as Jealous Lover
- The Fight Never Ends (1948)
- I'll Give My Life (1960) as Kopa, Medical Orderly
