= Patricia Rooney =

American film editor

- Born: Marion Bent; December 23, 1879; New York City, New York
- Died: July 28, 1940 (aged 60); New York City, New York
- Occupations: Film editor, actress, dancer
- Spouse: Pat Rooney Jr. (1904–her death)
- Parent(s): Arthur Bent; Alice Lawless

Patricia Rooney (born Marion Bent; December 23, 1879 - July 28, 1940) was an American film editor, dancer, and actress who was active in the industry from the 1910s through the 1930s. She was sometimes credited under her birth name and was married to Broadway performer Pat Rooney Jr.

== Biography ==
Rooney was the daughter of Arthur Bent and Alice Lawless (a cornet player and a dancer, respectively), both of whom had moved to New York City from England before she was born. During her childhood, her family moved from the Bronx to Greenwich Village, where she met her future husband, Pat Rooney Jr. (son of vaudeville dancer Pat Rooney Sr.).

On April 10, 1904, she married Rooney; the pair had a headlining vaudeville act together for many years. Julie Malnig, in her book Dancing Till Dawn: A Century of Exhibition Ballroom Dance, described the duo as "The reigning vaudeville comedy team of the teens". In addition to acting on the stage, Rooney also appeared in short films and worked as a film editor. She retired from performing in 1932 due to arthritis. Their son, Pat Rooney III, followed in their footsteps, embarking on a career on the stage.

Billed as Marion Bent, she appeared on Broadway in The Billionaire (1902) and Love Birds (1921).

She died in New York City at Calvary Hospital in 1940 after a lengthy illness and hospitalization.

== Selected filmography ==
As an editor:

- God's Step Children (1938)
- Swing! (1938)
- Enlighten Thy Daughter (1934)
- Old Loves and New (1926)
- Clothes Make the Pirate (1925)
- The Charmer (1925)
- Monsieur Beaucaire (1924)
- The Humming Bird (1924)

As an actress:

- The Three Diamonds (1929) (short)
- Marking Time (1929) (short)
- Love Birds (1929) (short)
- The Royal Pair (1929) (short)
- The Love Tree (1929) (short)
- Sweethearts (1929) (short)
- I'll Get Her Yet (1916) (short)
- He's a Bear (1915) (short)
- The Busy Bell Boy (1915) (short)
