= Lou Swarz =

American actress

- Swarz in 1953
- Born: Lucille Henrietta Schwartz; May 1897; St. Louis, Missouri, US
- Died: ?
- Other names: Lou LuTour; Linda Lou; Caol Wallis
- Occupations: Actress, columnist, beauty consultant, radio show host, teacher
- Years active: 1930s–1950s

Lou Swarz (born Lucille Henrietta Schwartz; May 1897 – ?) was an American actress who performed monologues in one-woman shows and featured in films during the 1930s through the 1950s. Her success drew an invitation from Eleanor Roosevelt to the summer White House. She also hosted radio shows and hosted performances at the 1939 New York World's Fair. She was also a teacher of theatre and beauty at Douglass University and other vocational schools, before becoming a sports columnist for The New York Age and having several syndicated columns.

Afterwards, she became a beauty consultant and then editor and director for the Global News Syndicate. She was simultaneously signed as a radio show host for her personal show, The Homemakers Club, that covered beauty tips, local news, and gospel music. She received multiple honors throughout her life for her community service work with her sorority Zeta Phi Beta and for her ongoing community engagement through her radio show, with her "La Cheerios" program sending positive cheer cards to people in hospitals and her "Teen Town" program to help reduce juvenile delinquency among African American teenagers being specifically praised.

== Childhood and education ==
Swarz was born in May 1897 in St. Louis, Missouri, to Amanda and Henry Boone Schwartz. Given the name Lucille H. Schwartz by her parents, she went through a number of alternative stage names, shortening it to Lou Swarz before changing to Linda Lou and then Caol Wallis for a short time before returning to Lou Swarz and later, in the 1950s, changing to Lou LuTour.

== Career ==
=== As a monologue performer ===
In the mid-1930s, Swarz became a dean at Herman Dreer's Douglass University at its School of Expression based on theater and drama. The same decade saw her begin her practice of skits and character acts in front of an audience, including drama monologues that involved using multiple different voices to play characters. For these one-woman shows she performed as characterizations of figures such as Hattie Tyson from Zora Neal Hurston's novel Jonah's Gourd Vine, a French mademoiselle who falls for an American G.I. during World War I, a gypsy fortune teller, Phillis Wheatley, and Sojourner Truth. She was highly praised for her portrayal of Truth during her primary performance at the 1938 National Baptist Convention. She also continued working in 1939 as a head English assistant in St. Louis for the Booker T. Washington Vocational Training School.

While she had been doing her performances since 1933 in the Midwest and Southwest, her official debut in New York was not until July 1939 at The Town Hall. From that point on, she became nationally known for her "One Woman Show" featuring monologue impressions of historic African Americans. Her shows garnered comparisons to the monologue work of Cornelia Otis Skinner. The following months saw Swarz invited by Eleanor Roosevelt to perform at the summer White House and she took the opportunity to give two performances at the 1939 New York World's Fair. Despite the sudden success of her show performances, Swarz had accrued debts over time and had to file for bankruptcy in February 1940.

From 1942, Swarz began doing a series of shows for the United Service Organizations at various army camps throughout the country and bringing gifts for the soldiers. This program was done in concert with Red Cross relief efforts. Alongside her Zeta sorority, Swarz spent three to four days a month doing USO performance tours until the end of World War II. She afterwards began doing a series of national tours in 1945, having added new monologues to her repertoire. In addition to starring in films, she also became Director of Negro Publicity for Jack Goldberg's Herald Pictures in 1947 and obtained her own press secretary, Wanda Macy. She further employed a personal assistant who was a fellow Zeta sorority member, Cecile Walker.

Theodore Hubbard became Swarz's professional theatrical manager in the summer of 1947 and she later used her newspaper column to help reunite Hubbard with his long-estranged sister. Swarz conducted another tour of shows across the Southern and Midwestern states in the final months of 1947, along with a stop in Hollywood, and in North Carolina in early 1948, with her performances focusing on black colleges and universities throughout the states.

=== As a columnist ===
Swarz became a columnist for The New York Age newspaper in 1945. She reported on sports events, including the August 22, 1945, Jimmy Bivins vs Archie Moore boxing match. This made her the first black woman to be a sports reporter for a national press chain. She later started her own newspaper column named "Lou Swarz' Jottings"; after the column obtained an international audience she considered renaming it "Around The Globe", before deciding to call it "Global Jotting(s)".

=== As a beauty consultant ===
Swarz held a School of Charm in St. Louis, and taught "Charm and Personality Development" classes in 1947 for the Sepia Hollywood Modeling Group. She also acted as beauty consultant for Global News Syndicate through 1951, before becoming associate editor for the company and then associate director by 1955. At the same time, she had an ongoing newspaper column called "Charm.." that covered beauty, fashion, and other tips on how to portray oneself.

=== As a radio host ===
Before moving to New York for her theatre debut in 1939, Swarz had run a radio show in her home town of St. Louis. In September 1952, Swarz was given her own daily radio show on the WWRL station in New York. Her show, The Homemakers Club, ran daily during the work week at 9 am, focusing on presenting recipes, beauty tips, general news, and different special features each day of the week involving community figures. The immediate success of the show resulted in her being signed to a daytime radio program with the WHOM station before the end of September. This new program was expanded to broadcast from Monday through Saturday for an hour and a half in the afternoon. The first half hour had the same segments and specials as Swarz's WWRL program, but the following hour was entirely gospel music in a program titled the Gospel Songfest where Swarz acted as disc jockey.

== Awards and honors ==
In June 1938, Swarz was awarded an honorary master's degree in drama by Douglass University, making her the youngest at the time to receive one and the first solo actress and third actress to receive one. In 1939 the St. Louis branch of the Benevolent and Protective Order of Elks gave Swarz an award, a wooden plaque replica of her own image, for her sorority and civic work. The Lou Swarz chapter of the Women's Defense Corps was named in her honor for her efforts to support the US military during World War II, and she personally received the citation given to the unit in July 1944. An award in recognition for her radio work was given to Swarz in May 1953 by the Vocational Guidance and Workshop center in New York. The St. Louis Argus presented her with one of their annual awards in 1964 for her humanitarian work with her sorority to help cheer up people in hospitals.

== Personal life ==
In 1938 Swarz helped to create the Vogue League of Expression, an organization for speakers and monologue performers on stage. As a member of the Zeta Phi Beta sorority, Swarz was involved in community outreach and social improvement projects. She acted as a member of the Xi Zeta chapter and began in the 1930s with the rank of Basileus. A "6 Point" program was organized by Swarz in November 1938 to focus on particular avenues of activity for the sorority, including educational, civic, social, charitable, cultural, and spiritual outreach branches. She presented a number of new projects in 1939 involving creating and expanding recreational centers and nurseries in "neglected localities" in major cities. By 1942, she had been promoted to the rank of national Epistoleus in the sorority.

A program started by Swarz in the mid-1940s and made an official program for the Zeta sorority in 1947 was the "La Cheerios" group that involved sending cheer cards to hospitals across the country every month and especially around holidays. Another program established by Swarz around the same time was the "Teen Town" system, which focused on reducing juvenile delinquency around New York where she first created it. She created the program in collaboration with the Salvation Army Red Shield Club. Swarz left her position as publicity director for the sorority in 1953 after starting her radio show in New York.

Swarz acted as the leader of the women's group in the J. Finley Wilson Elks club.

She had three sisters, Pearl Schwartz, Sarah Schwartz, and Vernedine Jennings.

== Theater ==
- The Wingless Victory (1940) as Toala
- Lysistrata (1946) as Thebian woman

== Radio ==
- The Homemakers Club on WWRL and WHOM
- The Black Spider (1942) (Radio play) on WEW

== Filmography ==
- Big Timers (1945) as Cora Washburn
- Tall, Tan, and Terrific (1946) as herself
- House-Rent Party (1946) as Mrs. Johnson
