= Lester Lang =

American cinematographer

- Born: Lester Stephen Lang; August 15, 1896; Fort Lee, New Jersey, USA
- Died: August 1969 (aged 73); Bergenfield, New Jersey, USA
- Years active: 1922–1948

Lester Lang was an American cinematographer known for lensing several of Oscar Micheaux's films in the 1930s.

== Biography ==
Lester was born in Union City, New Jersey, to John Lang and Elizabeth Frank. He married Lillian Sutherland, and the pair had three children together. She died suddenly in 1942. He worked as a photographer for 22 years at New York race tracks, and was one of the early cinematographers working in the film industry in Fort Lee, New Jersey.

== Selected filmography ==
- Killer Diller (1948)
- Big Timers (1945)
- The Notorious Elinor Lee (1940)
- Lying Lips (1939)
- God's Step Children (1938)
- Swing! (1938)
- Underworld (1937)
- Ten Minutes to Live (1932)
- Amor in Montagna (1932)
- Love's Interlude (1932)
- The Darktown Revue (1931)
- The Exile (1931)
- The House of Secrets (1929)
- The Mad Marriage (1925)
- The Mohican's Daughter (1922)
