= Clothes Make the Pirate =

1925 film by Maurice Tourneur

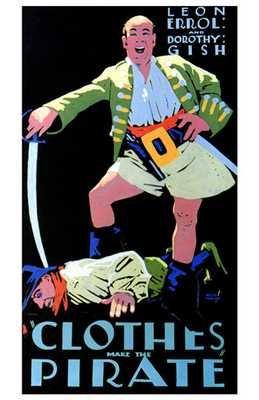
- Theatrical poster
- Directed by: Maurice Tourneur
- Written by: Marion Fairfax
- Based on: Clothes Make the Pirate by Holman Francis Day
- Produced by: Sam E. Rork Productions
- Starring: Leon Errol; Dorothy Gish; Nita Naldi; Tully Marshall
- Cinematography: Henry Cronjager; Louis Dunmyre
- Edited by: Patricia Rooney
- Distributed by: First National Pictures
- Release date: November 29, 1925
- Running time: 90 minutes
- Country: United States
- Language: Silent (English intertitles)

Clothes Make the Pirate is a 1925 American silent comedy film directed by Maurice Tourneur and starring Leon Errol and Dorothy Gish. The film was written by Marion Fairfax from the novel of the same name by Holman Francis Day.

== Plot ==
Tremble-at-Evil Tidd is a disgruntled 18th-century Bostonian wishes that he was a pirate. He dons the clothes and play-acts the part. He is mistaken for the real pirate, Dixie Bull whom Tidd, of course, bumps into later. Tidd "slays" the villain and puts his foot upon the pirate's head. This is more than enough and he heads back home to his unappreciated wife.

== Cast ==
- Leon Errol as Tremble-at-Evil Tidd
- Dorothy Gish as Betsy Tidd
- Nita Naldi as Madame De La Tour
- George F. Marion as Jennison
- Tully Marshall as Scute
- Frank Lawlor as Crabb
- Edna Murphy as Nancy Downs
- James Rennie as Lieutenant Cavendish
- Walter Law as Dixie Bull
- Reginald Barlow as Captain Montague

== Reception ==
Contemporary reviewers of the time claimed Errol was miscast, perhaps for the comedic cowardice of the part. Variety gave the film a poor review, stating that the children would like it. However other reviews, such as that in the Los Angeles Times of January 10, 1926 gave the film, as a satire, generally good reviews. However, the camera work of Cronjager was critically acclaimed.

== Preservation ==
With no prints of Clothes Make the Pirate located in any film archives, it is a lost film. A one minute trailer, however, does survive.
