= Carman Newsome =

American Actor from Kansas

Carman Newsome (June 21, 1912 – July 17, 1974) was an African-American actor, musician and band conductor in the United States. His work includes leading roles in five Oscar Micheaux films.

Born in Kansas, he moved to Cleveland, Ohio when he was a teenager. He went to Cleveland Central High School and started a popular Cleveland Jazz band. Newsome died in Cleveland.

In 1937, Micheaux hired Newsome to handle the sales and distribution of his films. Micheaux picked Newsome as the male lead in "God's Step Children" (1938). Newsome went on to star in four more Micheaux' films.

== Filmography ==
- God's Step Children (1938) as Jimmie (adult)
- Lying Lips (1938) as Benjamin Hadnott
- Swing (1938) as Ted Gregory
- Birthright (1939), as Peter, a young, black Harvard graduate
- The Notorious Elinor Lee (1940), as Norman Haywood
