= The Humming Bird =

1924 film by Sidney Olcott

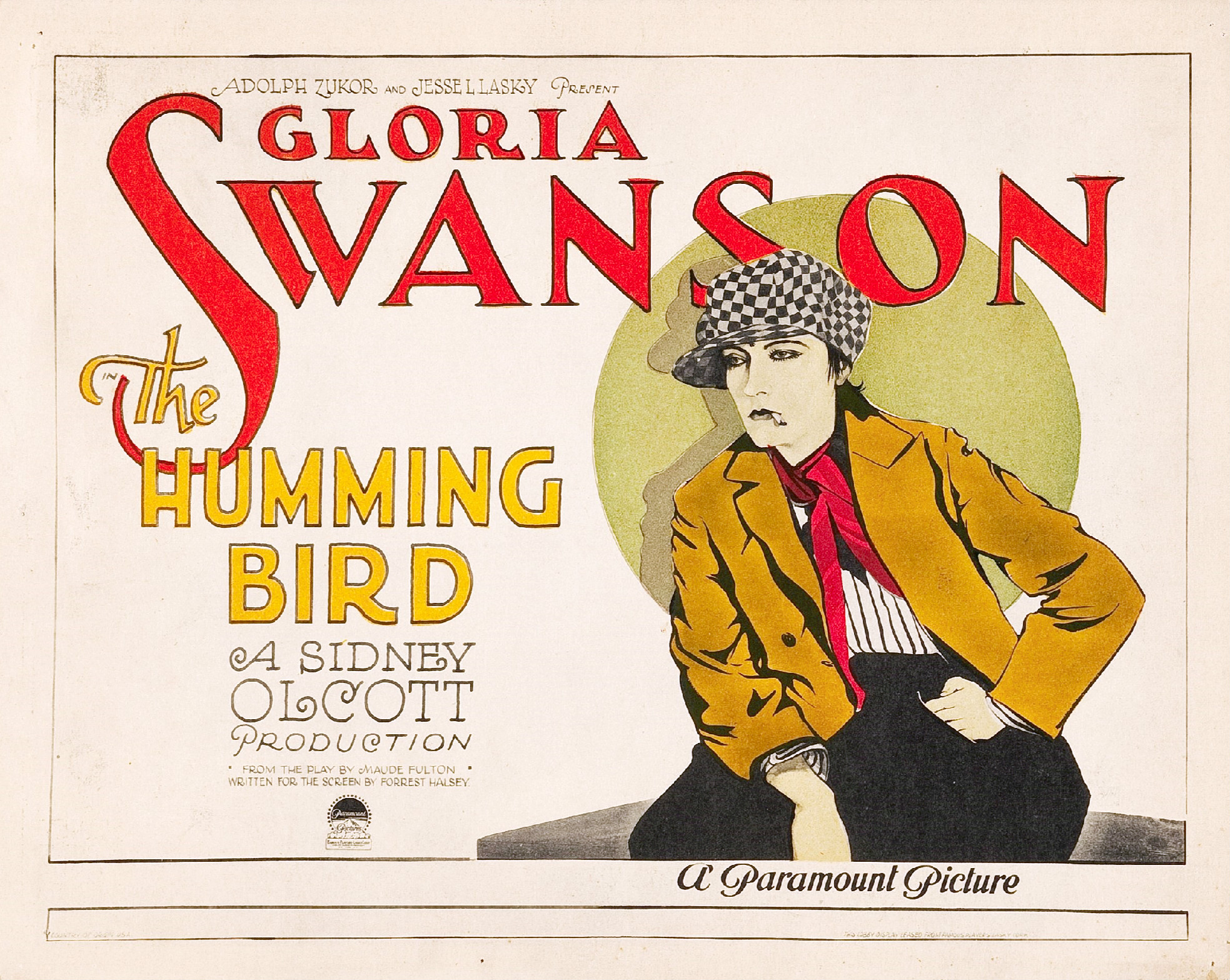
- Lobby card
- Directed by: Sidney Olcott
- Written by: Forrest Halsey (scenario)
- Based on: The Humming Bird by Maude Fulton
- Produced by: Adolph Zukor; Jesse L. Lasky
- Starring: Gloria Swanson
- Cinematography: Harry Fischbeck
- Edited by: Patricia Rooney
- Distributed by: Paramount Pictures
- Release date: January 13, 1924
- Running time: 80 minutes
- Country: United States
- Language: Silent (English intertitles)

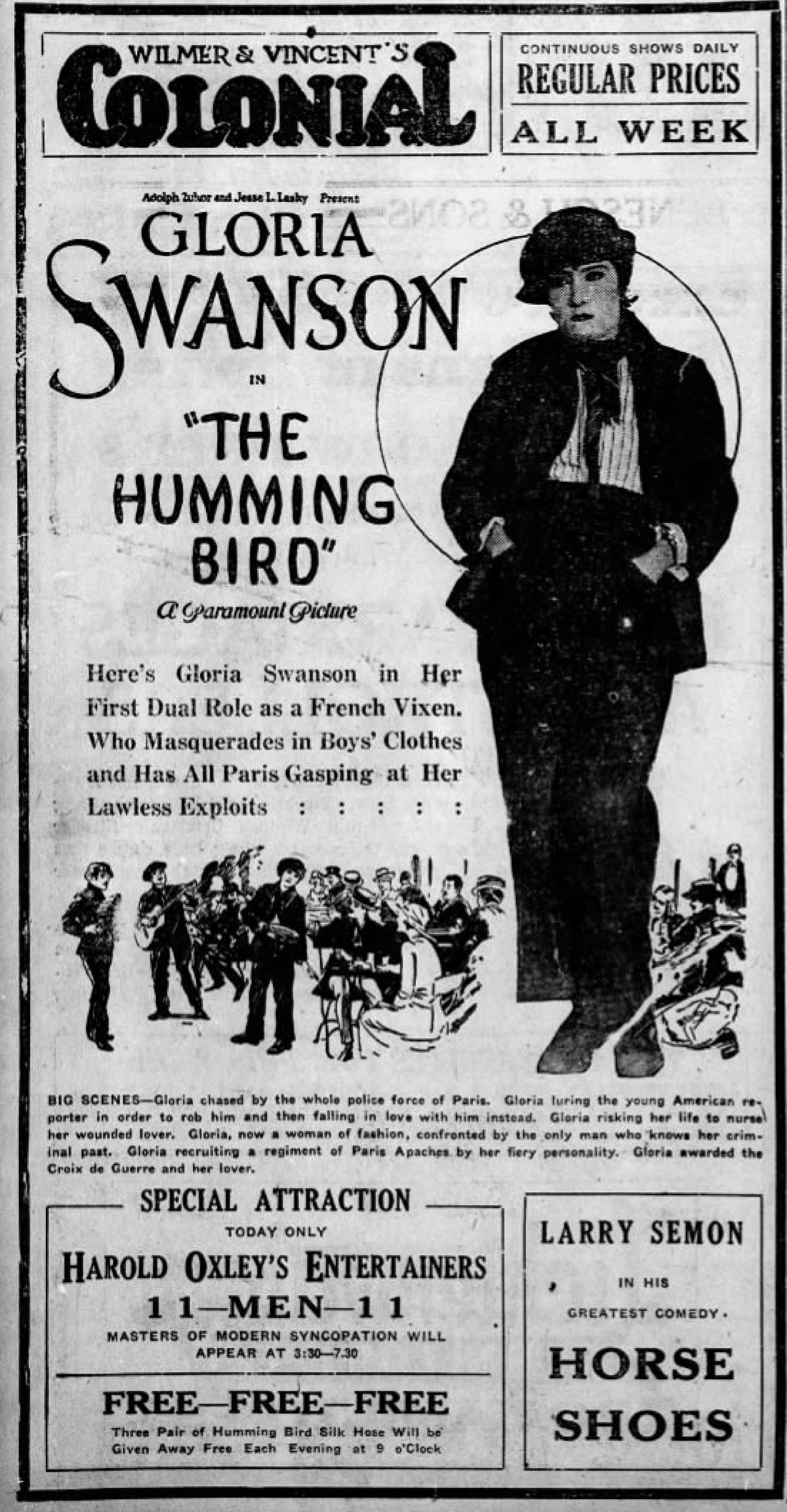
Colonial Theater Ad, 1924

The Humming Bird (also known as Les loups de Montmartre) is a 1924 American silent crime drama film directed by Sidney Olcott and starring Gloria Swanson. Produced by Famous Players–Lasky and distributed by Paramount Pictures, the film is based on the play of the same name by Maude Fulton, who also starred in the Broadway production.

== Plot ==
As described in a film magazine review, Toinette, alias "The Humming Bird" and member of the Apaches, commits many successful robberies in Paris while disguised as a young man. She falls in love with Randall Carey, an American newspaper correspondent. Randall joins the army when war breaks out. Toinette persuades her Apache confederate to enlist. She is jailed, but escapes during a Zeppelin bombardment and joins her wounded lover at his aunt's residence. The authorities pardon her and she finds happiness with Randall.

== Cast ==
- Gloria Swanson as Toinette
- Edmund Burns as Randall Carey
- William Ricciardi as Papa Jacques
- Cesare Gravina as Charlot
- Mario Majeroni as La Roche
- Adrienne D'Ambricourt as The Owl
- Helen Lindroth as Henrietta Rutherford
- Rafael Bonqini as Bouchet
- Regina Quinn as Beatrice
- Aurelio Coccia as Bosque
- Jacques D'Auray as Zi-Zi

== Production ==
The film was shot at the Kaufman Astoria Studios in Queens.

== Preservation ==
A print of The Humming Bird is housed at the Library of Congress and the Nederlands Filmmuseum.
