= Harlem After Midnight =

1934 film directed by Oscar Micheaux

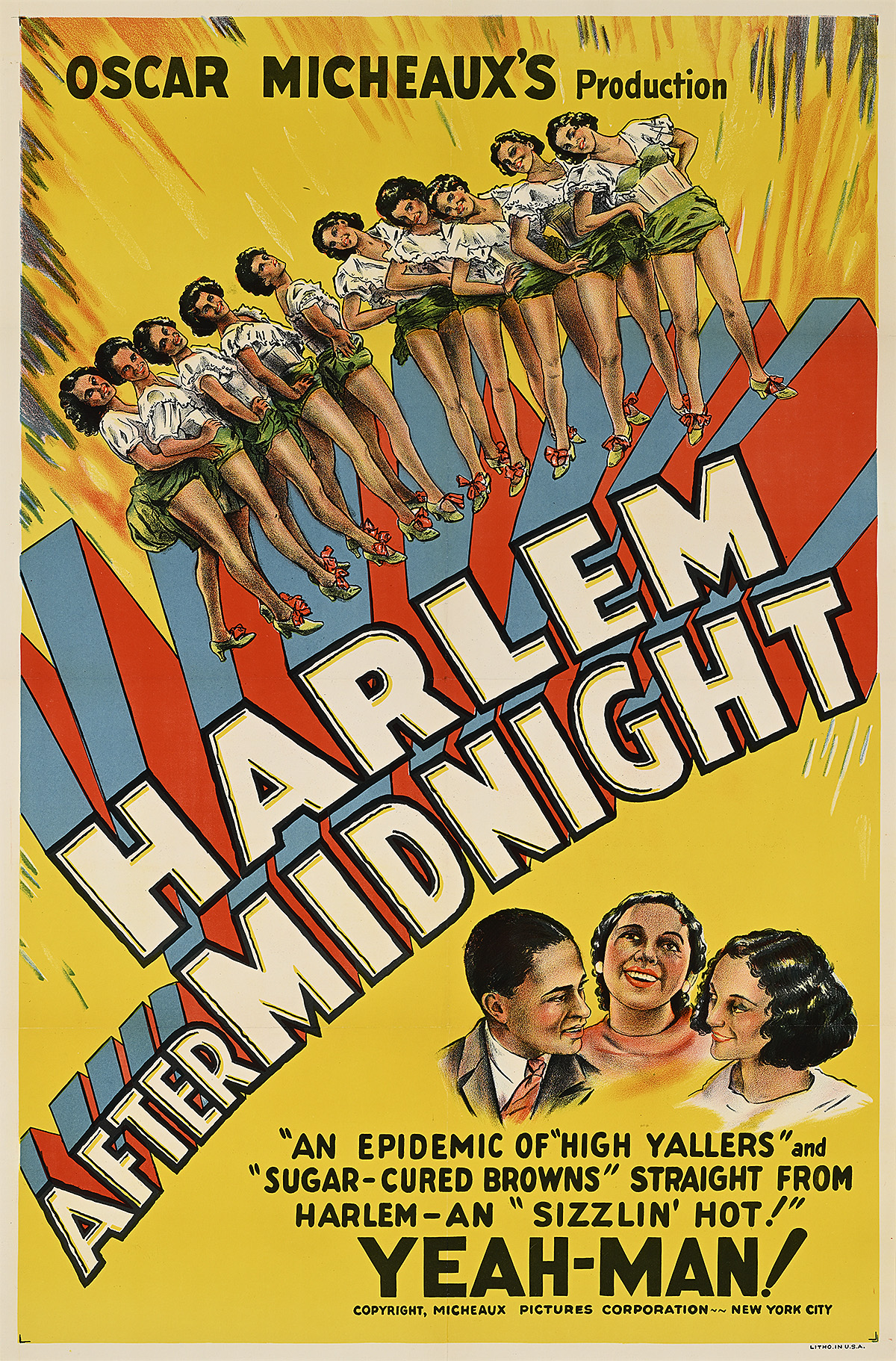
1934 poster for Harlem After Midnight

Harlem After Midnight (1934) is an American black-and-white silent film directed by author and director Oscar Micheaux. A drama film, it featured an "all-colored cast". As in most of the films created by Micheaux there is an all-black casting for the drama film. It is a lost film.

As this was a silent film the Bailey's Royal Theater accompanied it with music by Walter Barnes and his Royal Creolians. Many of the night club scenes were shot at the popular and most visited venues of this time where Micheaux hand-picked the leading cabaret singers in the film based on if they resembled the already set members of the cast. The settings of each scene were chosen by the producers to add in hilarity to the drama-filled and tense toned film.

Harlem After Midnight is a film that focuses on gangsters, kidnapping and the drama that comes along with the streets of Harlem. Throughout the film there are hidden secrets that are directly related to the Negro gangsters and henchmen who all have an unsuspecting background in the nightclubs in the city of Harlem. The nightlife scenes in this film are described as an hilarious reflection of what the nightlife is actually like in Harlem and it plays a huge part in the theme of this film.

== Plot ==
Vivian Poret dates her employer's son (Nelson Gentry) after her own husband (Jerry Martin) is sent to prison three years prior for being a part of a gang that he had snitched on. Jerry escapes from prison and learns that Vivian is doing well and living in Harlem, he decides to go visit her unknowing that her boyfriend is trying to convince her to get an annulment from him. After reuniting with Vivian she offers him everything that is from her accounts to go through with the divorce she wants, Jerry refuses and demands more than the amount that was being offered informing her that she will need to get the money from her boyfriend's family. Nelson has been having an affair which he later decides to call off with one of the kept women (Kate Elkins). Kate does not take the news of the arrangement being called off well and decides to take her revenge out on Vivian's younger sister Sacha, who has arrived to Harlem in hopes of becoming a famous entertainer.

Jerry and Kate team up to take revenge against Vivian, they agree to use one of Jerry's friends (Harold Stokes) to gain the trust of Sacha and lead her off the path of stardom that she desperately wants to be a part of. Harold succeeds in gaining the trust of Sacha after taking her out for a night on the town, he has plans to sell her to an old man who will use her for his own pleasure. Sacha finds out about this plan before Harold has enough time to start and goes to her sister after learning a lesson of the danger of trusting strangers. Meanwhile, Jerry is being hunted down by a man who he had given out information about years before and he hides at the home of Kate who is nervous after finding out about the manhunt that is going after Jerry. Jerry evades capture and goes to find Vivian once again in the search of money which she does not give him.

== Cast ==
The cast included Dorothy Van Engle.
