= Andrew S. Bishop =

Black American actor (1894-1959)

Andrew S. Bishop (1894–1959) was an actor on stage and screen in the United States. He often performing alongside Cleo Desmond in theatrical performances. Bishop starred in several of Oscar Michaux's African American films.

He was part of the Anita Bush Stock Company, led by Anita Bush.

Bishop is one of the actors pictured on a lobby card for the 1935 film Temptation held by the National Museum of African American History and Culture.

== Filmography ==
- A Son of Satan (working title The Ghost of Tolston's Manor) (1924) as Ghost
- The House Behind the Cedars (1927) as George Tryon
- Murder in Harlem (1935) as Anthony Brisbane
- Temptation as Kid Cotton
