= Birthright (1924 film) =

1924 film by Oscar Micheaux

- Directed by: Oscar Micheaux
- Written by: Oscar Micheaux
- Based on: Birthright by Thomas Sigismund Stribling
- Produced by: Oscar Micheaux
- Starring: J. Homer Tutt; Evelyn Preer; Salem Tutt Whitney
- Production company: Micheaux Film Corporation
- Release date: January 14, 1924
- Running time: 10 reels
- Country: United States
- Language: Silent

Birthright is a 1924 silent film by American director Oscar Micheaux. Produced in 10 reels, it is adapted from Thomas Sigismund Stribling's novel of the same title (1922). The film is now lost.

The cast included J. Homer Tutt (as Peter Siner), Evelyn Preer (as Cissie Deldine), Salem Tutt Whitney (as Tump Pack), Lawrence Chenault, and W. B. F. Crowell. The film explores experiences of a young African-American man who returns to a small Tennessee town after getting a college degree. Of mixed-race (called mulatto in the book), he struggles against the systemic racial discrimination of his society around the First World War.

Micheaux later rewrote the adaptation, and co-produced and directed a new 35 mm version of Birthright as a talkie, in 1938. It had a new cast. He filmed it in New Jersey.

== Cast ==
- J. Homer Tutt as Peter Siner
- Evelyn Preer as Cissie Deldine
- Salem Tutt Whitney as Tump Pack
- Lawrence Chenault
