= Dolly Jones (trumpeter) =

American jazz musician

Dolly Jones, (born 27 November 1902 – August 1975, Bronx, New York City), also known as Doli Armenra and Dolly Hutchinson, was a jazz trumpet and trombone player. She was the first female jazz trumpeter to be recorded.

== Early life, family and education ==
Jones was born in Chicago, Illinois. Her mother Diyaw (sometimes spelled Diyah or Dyer) Jones was a pre-Armstrong jazz trumpeter who also taught Valaida Snow ("Queen of the Trumpet"). Her father played saxophone. Although her mother taught her how to play trumpet, Jones was otherwise self-taught. She and her mother adopted the surname Armenra (sometimes spelled Armenera or Amenra).

== Career ==
With her mother and father, she was part of the Jones Family Band, which worked with Josephine Baker in 1919. In the early 1920s, she formed a trio, the Three Classy Misses, in Kansas City. Jones then toured as a trombonist in the bands of Ma Rainey in the Grand Theater in Chicago and was cornetist for Al Wynn's OKeh recordings. She toured with Ida Cox in 1928 and with Lil Hardin Armstrong's Harlem Harlicans in the early 1930s. The band performed in the Lafayette Theater and Apollo Theater in New York City and Chicago's Regal Theater. In 1932, she formed her own band, the Twelve Spirits of Rhythm. In New York City, she was part of a 15-member multiracial band, the Disciples of Swing. This band was billed as "seven whites, seven colored, and Dolly".

Jones was the first female trumpet player to record a jazz record. She was involved in two recording sessions: in 1926, Albert Wynn's Gut Bucket Five (including with Barney Bigard) and 1941 in the Stuff Smith Sextet.

She played trumpeter Miss Watkins, "a little girl from Birmingham", in Oscar Michaux's 1936 musical film Swing!. Credited as "Doli Armena", she has no speaking role in the film, but she performs trumpet several times, playing the songs "I May Be Wrong (But I Think You're Wonderful)" and "China Boy". She also appeared as an extra in Michaux's 1938 movie God's Step Children.

She continued to play into the 1970s with Eddie Barefield.

== Personal life ==
She was briefly married to saxophonist Jimmy "Hook" Hutchinson, during which she began to use his last name professionally.
