= Bud Pollard =

American actor

- Born: John Evelyn Godson; May 12, 1895; Victoria, British Columbia, Canada
- Died: December 17, 1952 (aged 57); Culver City, California, United States
- Occupations: Film director, screenwriter, film producer, actor

Bud Pollard (born John Evelyn Godson; May 12, 1895 – December 17, 1952) was a Canadian-American film director, screenwriter, film producer and actor. Pollard is known for such films as It Happened in Harlem, The Black King, Tall, Tan, and Terrific, Victims of Persecution and The Road to Hollywood.
