= Lorenzo Tucker =

American actor (1907–1986)

- Lorenzo Tucker, star of the early black cinema
- Born: June 27, 1907; Philadelphia, Pennsylvania, US
- Died: September 19, 1986 (aged 79); Hollywood, California, US
- Other name: The "Black Valentino"
- Years active: 1927–1947
- Spouse: Pauline Segura

Lorenzo Tucker (June 27, 1907 – August 19, 1986), known as the "Black Valentino," was an American stage and screen actor who played the romantic lead in the early black films of Oscar Micheaux.

Micheaux not only produced films, but he wrote, directed, edited and promoted them in segregated theaters. His films proved so commercially viable that Micheaux was able to borrow enough money from theater owners who had screened his last offering so that he could finance his next.

Micheaux took on Tucker as a prime love interest opposite several black beauties in such low-budget but popular pictures as Wages of Sin, Daughter of the Congo, Harlem Big Show, Temptation and Veiled Aristocrats.

== Early life ==
Lorenzo Tucker was born in Philadelphia on June 27, 1907, the first-born child of John and Virginia (Lee) Tucker. He briefly attended Temple University before leaving to pursue a career in performance, working as a hotel waiter and dancer and later appearing in vaudeville and minstrel shows.

== Acting career ==
Born in Philadelphia, Tucker started acting at Temple University, where he was a student. Tucker also appeared early in his career with Bessie Smith on cross-country tours.

From 1926 to 1946, Tucker appeared in 18 of Micheaux's films, including When Men Betray (1928), Wages of Sin (1929), Easy Street (1930), Harlem Big Show, Veiled Aristocrats (1932), Ten Minutes to Live (1932), Harlem After Midnight (1934), Temptation (1935), and Underworld (1937). He became known as the "Black Valentino" because of his good looks and role as the romantic lead in the early black cinema. Tucker noted the irony of the appellation because he believed Rudolph Valentino had a darker complexion than Tucker. He became a movie star to black America and often was mentioned in the leading black newspapers. One of Micheaux and Tucker's more controversial films was Veiled Aristocrats, where Tucker played a black man who passed as white and tried to persuade his sister to pass for white. He also made a cameo appearance with Paul Robeson in 1933's The Emperor Jones.

Tucker was also a successful stage actor, appearing on Broadway in The Constant Sinner, Ol' Man Satan, and Humming Sam. His most controversial role came in The Constant Sinner in which he portrayed the pimp Money Johnson and in which Mae West was his prostitute Babe Gordon. Although miscegenation was outlawed in some parts of the Southern U.S., the play included a scene in which Tucker kissed West. When the play opened in Washington, D.C., the press was outraged to see a black man kissing a white woman, and demands were made that the scene be excised from the play. West rejected demands, and the play left Washington. The Shuberts refused to permit Tucker to play the role, and white actor George Givot was hired to play the role wearing blackface. Despite the Shuberts' decision, West cast Tucker in a few minor parts, including the role of a Spaniard who walks across the stage. When a woman asks West's character who that is, West responded "Oh, he's Spanish — he's my Spanish fly!"

== Later years ==
During World War II, Tucker was a tail gunner in the U.S. Army Air Corps. After the war, Tucker appeared in Louis Jordan's film Reet, Petite and Gone; in the early 1950s, he returned to the stage appearing in a London production of Anna Lucasta.

Tucker later became an autopsy technician for the New York City medical examiner, where he worked on the bodies of Malcolm X and Nina Mae McKinney. In 1977 Tucker moved permanently to Hollywood, where he continued to seek work. He took a nighttime security guard job, he said, so his days would be free for interviews. Tucker died of lung cancer at age 79 at his home in Hollywood, California. He left a widow, Pauline Segura Tucker. His funeral took place at Blessed Sacrament Catholic Church in Hollywood, California.

== Military service ==
Tucker served in the U.S. Army Air Corps during World War II. Reports note that he both participated in service activities overseas and produced shows for troops during the war.

== Honors and awards ==
In 1974, Tucker was inducted into the Black Film Makers Hall of Fame, and he received the Audelco Recognition Award in 1981.

== Legacy ==
On an episode of The Cosby Show, titled "Denise Drives", Clair Huxtable quizzes Denise Huxtable on car safety asking if she should stop her car for a stranger on a dark rainy night with "hair like Lorenzo Tucker, eyes like Billy Dee and a smile like Nat King Cole."

== Bibliography ==
- Richard Grupenhoff. The Black Valentino: The Stage and Screen Career of Lorenzo Tucker. Metuchen, NJ: Scarecrow Press, 1988. ISBN 0-8108-2078-1
