= Nannie Helen Burroughs =

American educator and activist (1879–1948)

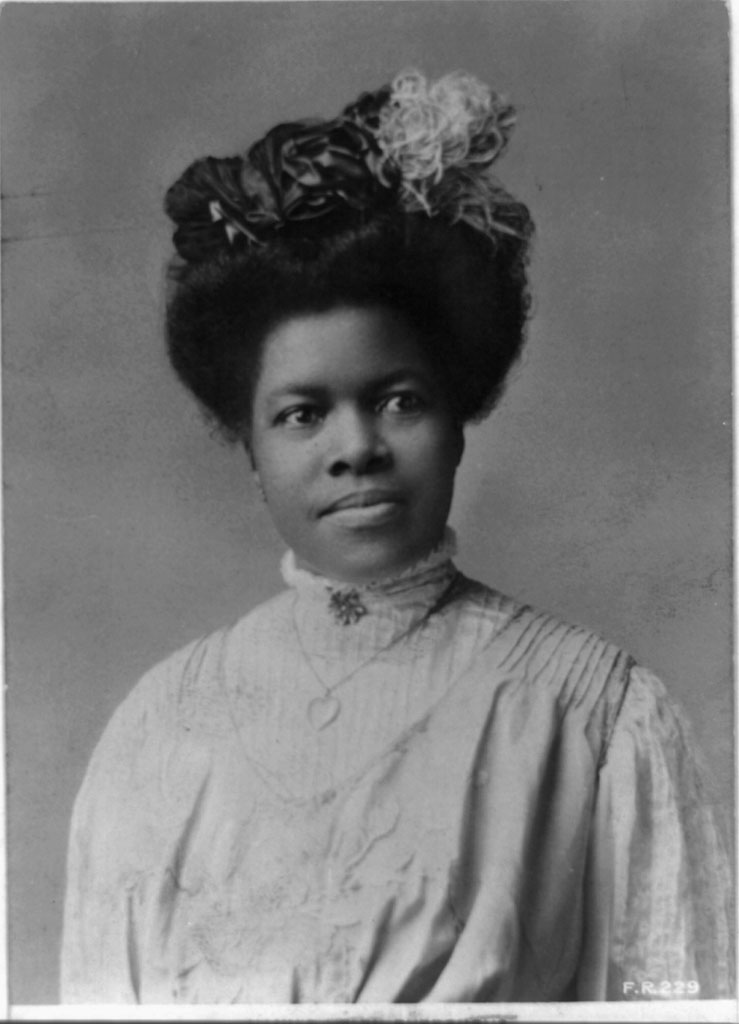
- Burroughs in 1909
- Born: May 2, 1879; Orange, Virginia, U.S.
- Died: May 20, 1961 (aged 82); Washington, D.C., U.S.
- Occupations: Educator; orator; religious leader; civil rights activist; businesswoman
- Known for: Founding the National Training School for Women and Girls

Nannie Helen Burroughs (May 2, 1879 – May 20, 1961) was an educator, orator, religious leader, civil rights activist, feminist, and businesswoman in the United States. Her speech "How the Sisters Are Hindered from Helping," at the 1900 National Baptist Convention in Virginia, instantly won her fame and recognition. In 1909, she founded the National Training School for Women and Girls in Washington, DC. Burroughs' objective was at the point of intersection between race and gender.

She fought both for equal rights as well as opportunities for women beyond the duties of domestic housework. She continued to work until her death in 1961. In 1964, the National Training School for Women and Girls was renamed the Nannie Helen Burroughs School in her honor and began operating as a co-ed elementary school. Constructed in 1927–1928, its Trades Hall has a National Historic Landmark designation.

In 1913, Nannie H. Burroughs became one of the first four Honorary Members of Delta Sigma Theta sorority. The other three were Mary Church Terrell, Coralie Franklin Cook and Gabrielle L. Pelham, mother of Dorothy Pelham Beckley.

== Early life and education ==
Nannie H. Burroughs born on May 2, 1879, in Orange, Virginia. She is considered to be the eldest of the daughters of John and Jennie Burroughs. Around the time she was five years old, Nannie's youngest sisters died and her father, who was a farmer and Baptist preacher, died a few years later. John and Jennie Burroughs had both formerly been enslaved.

Nannie's parents had skills and capacities that enabled them to start toward prosperity by the time the war ended and freed them. She had a grandfather known as Lija the carpenter, during the slave era, who was capable of buying his way out to freedom.

By 1883, Burroughs and her mother relocated to D.C. and stayed with Cordelia Mercer, Nannie Burroughs' aunt and older sister of Jennie Burroughs. In D.C., there were better opportunities for employment and education. Burroughs attended M Street High School. It was here she organized the Harriet Beecher Stowe Literary Society, and studied business and domestic science. There she met her role models Anna J. Cooper and Mary Church Terrell, who were active in the suffrage movement and civil rights.

Upon graduating from M Street High School with honors in 1896, Burroughs sought work as a domestic-science teacher in the District of Columbia Public Schools, but was unable to find a position. Though it is not documented that she was explicitly told, Burroughs was refused the position with the implication that her skin was too dark — they preferred lighter-complexioned black teachers. Her skin color and social status had thwarted her for the appointment she was chosen for. Burroughs said that "the die was cast [to] beat and ignore both until death." This zeal opened a door to the profession for low-income and social status black women. This is what led Burroughs to establish a training school for women and girls.

== Career ==
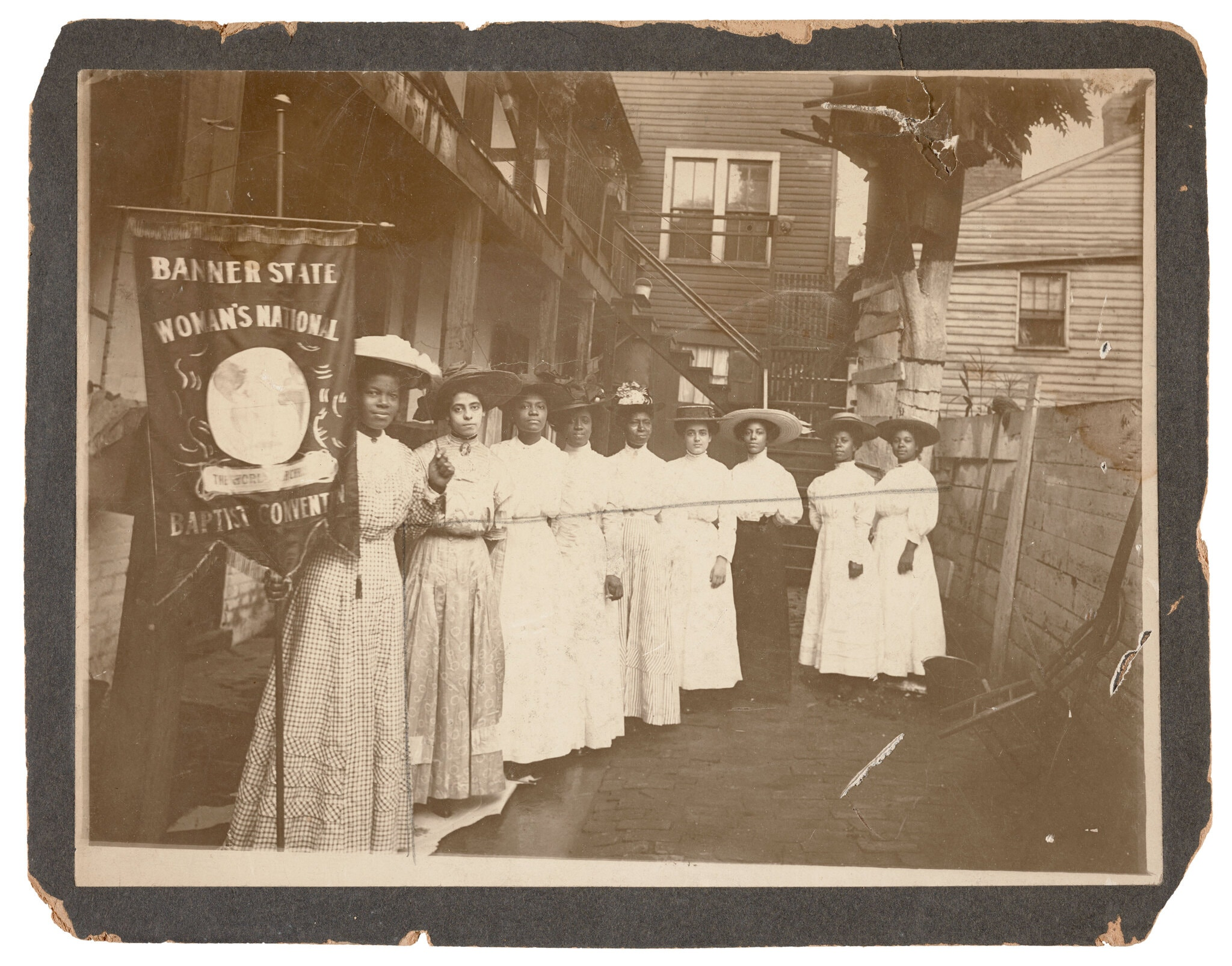
Nannie Burroughs holding the Woman's National Baptist Convention banner.

From 1898 to 1909, Burroughs was employed in Louisville, Kentucky, as an editorial secretary and bookkeeper of the Foreign Mission Board of the National Baptist Convention. In her time in Louisville, the Women's Industrial Club had formed. Here they held domestic science and management courses. One of the founders of the Women's Convention was Nannie Burroughs, providing additional help to the National Baptist Convention and serving from 1900 to 1947: nearly half a century. She was president for 13 years in the Women's Convention.

This convention had the largest attendance of African Americans ever seen, and help from this convention was highly important for black religious groups, thanks to the National Association of Colored Women (NACW) which formed in 1896, the largest of three and including more than 100 local women's clubs. Because of her contribution to the NACW, the National Association of Wage Earners was founded to draw the public's attention to the dilemma of African-American women.

Burroughs was president, with other well-known club women such as vice president Mary McLeod Bethune and treasurer Maggie Lena Walker. These women placed more emphasis on public interest educational forums than trade-union activities. Burroughs' other memberships included Ladies' Union Band, Saint Lukes, Saturday Evening, and Daughters of the Round Table Clubs. Burroughs' also actively participated in the National Association for the Advancement of Colored People (NAACP).

By 1928 Burroughs was working in the system. She was appointed to committee chairwoman by the administration of Herbert Hoover, which was associated with Negro housing, for the White House Conference of 1931 Home Building and Ownership, straight from the stock market crash of 1929 just as the Great Depression began. Burroughs spoke at the Virginia Women's Missionary Union at Richmond with the address "How White and Colored Women Can Cooperate in Building a Christian Civilization." in 1933

Burroughs was also a published playwright. In the 1920s, she wrote The Slabtown District Convention and Where is My Wandering Boy Tonight?, both one-act plays for amateur church theatrical groups. The popularity of the comedic, satiric Slabtown necessitated multiple printings through the succeeding century, although sometimes the wording is updated as needed by successive productions.

== Training school and racial uplift ==
Burroughs opened the National Training School in 1908. In the first few years of being open, the school provided evening classes for women who had no other means for education. The classes were taught by Burroughs herself. There were 31 students who regularly attended her classes, however, after time, and due to the high level of teaching, the school began attracting more students. The school was founded in a small farmhouse that eventually attracted women from all over the nation.

During the first 40 years of the 20th century, young African-American women were being prepared by the National Training School to "uplift the race" and obtain a livelihood. The emphasis of the school was "the three B's: the Bible, the bath, and the broom". Burroughs created her own history course that was dedicated to informing women about society influencing Negroes in history. Since this was not a topic that was discussed in regular historical curriculum, Burroughs found it necessary to teach African American women to be proud of their race.

With the incorporation of industrial education into training in morality, religion, and cleanliness, Nannie Helen Burroughs and her staff needed to resolve a conflict central to many African-American women. "Wage laborer" was their main role of the service occupations of the ghetto, as well as their biggest role model as guardians for "the race" of the community. The dominant culture of African Americans' immoral image had to be challenged by the National Training School, training African-American women from a young age to become efficient wage workers as well as community activists, reinforcing the ideal of respectability, as extremely important to "racial uplift."

Racial pride, respectability, and work ethic were all key factors in training being offered by the National Training School and racial uplift ideology. These qualities were seen as extremely important for African-American women's success as fund-raisers, wage workers, and "race women". All these gathered from the school would bring African-American women into the labor of public sphere including politics, uplifting racial aid, and the domestic sphere expanded. By understanding the uplift ideology of its grassroots nature, Burroughs had used it to promote her school. Many disagreed with Burroughs teaching women skills that did not directly apply to domestic housework. Nonetheless, students continued coming and the school carried on.

Notwithstanding its broad curriculum and emphasis on racial uplift, there were people who perceived the school largely in terms of domestic service. A 1918 article about the school in Seattle magazine The Town Crier was headlined "Solving the Servant Problem" and described the school's curriculum as "domestic science, sewing, millinery, stenography, bookkeeping, budget housekeeping, with 'schooling' all along the way" and also discussing a small farm operated by the school and used for agricultural training. The article even made a veiled allusion to slavery: "What fine Southern women conveyed to their house servants long ago had seemed likely to be lost" and adding that a student who fails to meet standards, "will not get 'whipped' but she'd rather be than fall under Miss Burroughs' displeasure."

== Death and legacy ==
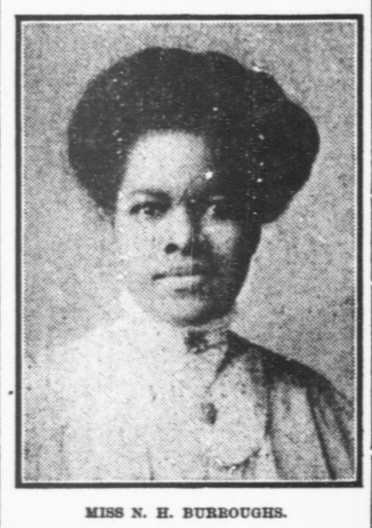
Nannie Burroughs, 1913.

She died on May 20, 1961, after an extraordinarily fruitful life dedicated to the advancement of women and girls through the National Trade and Professional School, the Women's Convention of the National Baptist Convention, and other organizations and roles. She was buried at the Nineteenth Street Baptist Church where she was a member.

Three years after her death the institution was renamed the Nannie Burroughs School and has remained that way since. Even though more than 50 years has passed since her death, her history and legacy continue to motivate modern African-American women. The Manuscript Division in The Library of Congress holds 110,000 items in her papers.

- 1907, she received an honorary M.A. from Eckstein Norton University, a historically black college in Cane Spring, Bullitt County, Kentucky. (It merged with Simpson University in 1912.)
- Burroughs' image was included in the 1945 painting Women Builders by William H. Johnson as part of his Fighters for Freedom series.
- In 1964, the school that Burroughs had founded in 1909 as the National Training School for Women and Girls in Washington, DC, was renamed the Nannie Helen Burroughs School in her honor. Its Trades Hall has been designated as a National Historic Landmark.
- In 1975, Mayor Walter E. Washington declared May 10 Nannie Helen Burroughs Day.
- Nannie Helen Burroughs Avenue NE, formerly Deane Avenue and Grant Streets, in the Deanwood neighborhood of Washington, DC, is named for her.
- In 1997 the National Women's History Project honored Burroughs during Women's History Month.

== Other sources ==
- Daniel, Sadie I. (1931). Women Builders. Washington, Associated Publishers. OCLC 827419. LCCN 32-3462.
- Easter, Opal V. (1995). Nannie Helen Burroughs. New York: Garland Pub. ISBN 0-8153-1861-8. OCLC 31412059. LCCN 94-23655.
- Encyclopedia of African-American Culture and History, 2006
- Graves, Kelisha B. (2019). Nannie Helen Burroughs: a documentary portrait of an early civil rights pioneer, 1900/1959. Notre Dame, Indiana. ISBN 978-0-268-10553-2. OCLC 1053491232.
- Washington, Sondra B. (2006). The Story of Nannie Helen Burroughs. Birmingham: Woman's Missionary Union, SBC. ISBN 9781563098482. OCLC 1563098482. LCCN 2016-497174.
