= Frances E. Williams =

American actress, activist, theatre producer, and community worker (1905–1995)

- Born: Frances Elizabeth Williams; September 17, 1905; East Orange, New Jersey, U.S.
- Died: January 2, 1995 (aged 89)
- Occupations: Actress; activist/unionist; theatre producer; organizer; community worker
- Years active: 1939–1994
- Awards: Frances E. Stevens Crystal Stairs Award named in her honour

Frances Elizabeth Williams (September 17, 1905 – January 2, 1995) was an American actress, activist, theatre producer, organizer, and community worker. Williams was the first black woman to run for the California State Assembly in 1948 on the Progressive Ticket and served on the boards of the Screen Actors Guild, Actors' Lab, and Actors Equity. She represented the World Peace Council at the first Angola Independence Celebration in 1975, and co-founded the Art Against Apartheid Movement in Los Angeles in the 1980s.

== Early life ==
Williams was born Frances Elizabeth Jones on September 17, 1905, in East Orange, New Jersey, to William Henry Jones and Elizabeth Nelson Jones, the youngest of three children. Her father drove a delivery wagon, and her mother was a laundress. Shortly after moving to Pittsburgh, William Jones died. Her mother, Elizabeth, met and married Ben Williams, a policeman; the family moved to Cleveland, Ohio. While still in high school, Williams got a job as director of activities at the Central Avenue Bath House. Down the street from the Bath House was the Playhouse Settlement founded by Russell and Rowena Jelliffe, who graduated with their masters in social work from Oberlin College. Williams began working at the Playhouse Settlement. She became the Settlement's first resident worker and lived there fourteen years until she left to study theater in the Soviet Union.

Part of the Settlement House was for recreational activity for the young including a children's theater started by Rowena Jelliffe and later an adult theater. Williams began writing and directing some of the plays performed in the children's theater and later in the adult theater she performed with Hazel Mountain Walker, John Marriott and others. In 1922, after a visit from Charles Gilpin, the Dumas Dramatic Club changed its name to the Gilpin Players in his honor. In 1927, the name of the theater was changed to Karamu House, a Swahili word for central meeting place.

In 1932, Williams married George Ferguson, a man she had known a number of years. The marriage lasted one year.

She remained for 14 years at Karamu House, taking part in 85 productions, writing and directing plays, making costumes, and designing sets. On the suggestion of her friend Langston Hughes, and the encouragement from playwright Friedrich Wolf who wrote "Sailors of Cattaro". she went to the Soviet Union to study theater. In 1934, Soviet theater was known for its outstanding productions by actor and director Vsevolod Meyerhold, directors Constantin Stanislavski, Elanskaya, Natalya Sats, Moskvin, and Kachaov. Williams studied at the Moscow Children's Theatre run by Natalya Sats and attended many of the theater productions in Moscow.

After two years in Moscow, her passport having expired, Williams went to Helsinki, Finland, to renew it. In 1936, political tensions in Europe were at its height. She found a job working at a travel agency and stayed in Finland for several months. Because of her friendship with the daughter of playwright Hella Wuolijoki, she was introduced to Ingmar Bergman and other writers and was invited to Marleback, a favorite meeting place of politicians and literary people including Bertolt Brecht. Williams felt the time she spent in Helsinki taught her more about politics than at any time before.

In 1939, Williams married William Anthony Hill, social worker, who, according to an article in Ebony magazine, "Ceramics by Tony Hill" (Vol. 2, November 1946, pp. 3–35), became known as one of the best ceramists on the West coast. In 1941, they moved to Los Angeles, California. Together they did many cultural things together such as organize an exhibit for the art of Jacob Lawrence, the first formal exhibition of its kind in Los Angeles; and one for Charles White. When Katherine Dunham brought her troupe to Los Angeles from Chicago, Williams put together a road tour for her. When Waters went on a road tour for Mamba's Daughters, Waters hired Williams as her assistant. Waters convinced the producers to offer Williams the part as her understudy.

== Acting career ==
Actress, director, theatre producer, theatre owner, union organizer and arts advocate, Williams was a pivotal force in the arts community for more than seventy years. Author Bill Reed, in his book Hot From Harlem: Profiles in Classic African-American Entertainment, devotes an entire chapter to her career. He shares that Paul Robeson noted her "complete artistic contributions and integrity" in his inscription when autographing his autobiography, Here I Stand. Shortly after her return from Europe, Williams moved to New York City and soon joined the cast of You Can't Take It with You. The company went on tour across the U.S. for two years. After the tour, Williams returned to New York and became active in the newly formed Negro Actors Guild organized by Noble Sissle and Leigh Whipper. Among its members were Fredi Washington, executive director; Edna Thomas, executive secretary; Ethel Waters, Bill Robinson, Louis Armstrong, J. Rosamond Johnson, and Rev. Adam Clayton Powell. Williams had met many of them when they visited Karamu House.

Williams appeared in two of Oscar Micheaux's films, Lying Lips, 1939, and The Notorious Elinor Lee, 1940. She continued her training at Actor's Lab and was on their executive board. What frustrated her most was she was never given the opportunity to play a lead role; instead she worked as stage manager, on lights, sets, and costumes. In addition, she worked with Charlie Chaplin at Circle Theater in the Round and at the Cosmos Theater in Hollywood.

In 1946, her first Hollywood film role was as Amy in Magnificent Doll with David Niven and Ginger Rogers. In 1949, she worked with James Mason and Joan Bennett in The Reckless Moment. This was followed in 1951 by Show Boat with Katherine Grayson, Howard Keel, Ava Gardner, and William Warfield.

While she appeared on stage, in more than forty films, on television shows in minor roles, and in commercials, it was not until 1987 that she was hired to play the role of Miss Marie in a new comedy-drama series, Frank's Place starring Tim Reid. Produced by Reed and Hugh Wilson, and set in New Orleans, it featured an integrated cast of veteran actors. Williams played "Miss Marie, waitress emeritus". Each episode contained plausible plots capturing the folk experiences of African Americans in New Orleans. Despite being well received by many fans and critics, it was cancelled after one season (1987–88). A few weeks into the season, Nielsen ratings reflected a drop in viewership. The fact that CBS moved the show around a lot, changing its time slot and shuffling the night it was broadcast, was a contributing factor.

== Personal life and activism ==
After nine years of marriage, in 1948, Williams and Hill were divorced. Being a member of Actors' Equity, she became actively involved with progressive people. She was part of the Homeowners Protective Association organized by Charlotta Bass, publisher and editor of The California Eagle, a major newspaper in the community. That same year, Williams became the first black woman to run for the California State Assembly for the 63rd District on the Progressive ticket.

As a trade unionist, Williams served on the board of the National Negro Labor Council (NNLC) and with her friend Paul Robeson, on October 27, 1951, she attended their first convention in Cincinnati. Among the unions represented were delegates from the United Electrical, Radio and Machine Workers, the United Packinghouse Workers, and the Food, Tobacco, Agricultural, and Allied Workers Union. Eventually the NNLC was labeled "subversive" and "Communist-dominated" and a "tool of the Soviet Union." and was investigated by the House Un-American Activities Committee (HUAC).

In the early 1950s, with the growing popularity of television, several unions in the entertainment industry including Chorus Equity, the American Guild of Variety Artists, the American Guild of Musical Artists, and Actors' Equity formed the Television Authority (TVA). The TVA was a forerunner to the American Federation of Television and Radio Artists (AFTRA). Two representatives from each union were included on the board. Williams was on the board of the TVA representing Actors' Equity. With the onslaught of the McCarthy era, Actors Equity and TVA were under attack. Because she was a progressive and had refused to sign the loyalty oath, she was asked to resign from the board. On June 20, 1952, Williams delivered her resignation speech to the committee. As a result of her work on the board, ethnic actors were able to get more work albeit as extras. After her resignation, a year would pass before she worked in film again.

During the 1950s, at a time when Senator Joseph McCarthy and HUAC sought to rid the film industry of anyone considered progressive or left-leaning, many in the industry were blacklisted. Several of Hollywood blacklisted members formed a film production company. Among them were Herbert Biberman, Paul Jarrico, Albert Maltz, Michael Wilson, and Adrian Scott. Williams was asked to participate on one of their projects. She was hired as assistant director on the film Salt of the Earth (uncredited). She helped to cast the film and worked with the actors and non actors, representing them in their grievances, but because she was working on a film in Hollywood, she had to leave. Despite the problems encountered not only from the government, but also from the production heads, it was a landmark picture. She was enormously proud.

In the 1960s, with a bleeding ulcer, Williams along with her brother Bill, moved to Mazatlan, Mexico, where they lived for nine years until Bill died. It was close enough to Hollywood so she could fly back and forth with little trouble.

In 1975, Williams was a delegate to the World Women's Conference in East Berlin, East Germany, and in November of that year she attended the first independence day celebration in Angola, Africa as the only American representative. A year later (1976), she attended the World Peace Council in Athens, Greece.

In 1978, Williams served as chairperson of the National Anti-Imperialist Movement in Solidarity with African Liberation (NAIMSAL), Los Angeles office. From 1975 to 1989, Williams co-founded Art Against Apartheid and along with other artists and entertainers performed in schools around Los Angeles educating students about Apartheid in South Africa.

== Death ==
Williams died on January 2, 1995. She had been hospitalized following complications from a stroke she suffered in September, shortly after her 89th birthday.

The Frances E. Williams Artist Grants [FEWAG] was established, as directed by Williams in her will, providing funds for Blacks in the arts "to take classes to perfect their craft". Between 2005 and 2014, $229,000 was dispensed in small grants to individual artists and arts organizations.

Williams' papers are housed at the Southern California Library for Social Studies and Research in Los Angeles.

== Awards and honors ==
Frances E. Williams Crystal Stair Award, Black Women of the Theater, West, established in Williams's honor. National Association for the Advancement of Colored People Image Award, Hall of Fame. National Women of Journalism. Paul Robeson Pioneer Award, Black American Cinema Society. Rosa Parks Award, Southern Christian Leadership Conference. Saint Philip's Episcopal Church.

== Select filmography ==
- Lying Lips – 1939, Micheaux Film Corp., Oscar Micheaux, dir.
- The Notorious Elinor Lee – 1940, Micheau Film Corp., Oscar Micheaux, dir.
- Magnificent Doll – 1946 Universal, Frank Borzage, dir.
- The Reckless Moment – 1949, Columbia, Max Ophüls, dir.
- Three Secrets – 1950, Paramount, Robert Wise, dir.
- Show Boat – 1951, MGM, George Sidney, dir.
- Man of a Thousand Faces – 1957, Universal, Joseph Penney, dir.
- Together Brothers – 1974, Fox, William A. Graham, dir.
- The River Niger – 1976, Cine Artists, Krisna Shah, dir., Ike Jones Productions
- Sparkle – 1976, Warner Brothers, Sam O'Steen, dir.
- A Piece of the Action – 1977, Warner Bros., Sidney Poitier, dir
- The Toolbox Murders – 1978, Cal-Am, Dennis Donnelly, dir.
- The Jerk – 1979, Universal, Carl Reiner, dir.
- Cross Creek – 1983, Universal, Martin Ritt dir.

== Television ==
=== Series, 1970s and 1980s ===
- The Waltons – Lorimar
- General Hospital – ABC
- Gibbsville – Columbia Pictures
- Magic Carpet to Fine Arts – Children's TV Series, NYC
- Hill Street Blues
- Designing Women
- Frank's Place
- The Boys
- Police Story
- The White Shadow
- Freestyle – KCET
- Palmerstown
- Little House on the Prairie

=== Movies for television ===
- A Dream for Christmas
- A Woman Called Moses
- King
- Sister, Sister
- The Ambush Murders

=== Stage ===
- You Can't Take It with You – on Broadway and on tour
- A Raisin in the Sun – on Broadway and on tour
- The Little Foxes – on tour
- The Male Animal – on tour
- Scarlet Sister Mary – on tour
- The Amen Corner – Hollywood
- The Taming of the Shrew – Hollywood
- Abe Lincoln – Hollywood

=== Radio ===
- Lux Theatre of the Air

=== Producing and directing ===
Film: Salt of the Earth, assistant director and production staff member, 1954.

Television: Integration LA, University of Chicago, writer and director. Magic Carpet to the Fine Arts, writer and director. These Are Americans Too, National Broadcasting Company, Chet Huntley Productions, writer and director. Uptown, Channel 13, Los Angeles, co-producer and director.

== Sources ==
- Christian, Anna (1999). Meet it, Greet it, and Defeat it! The Biography of Frances E. Williams, Actress/Activist. Los Angeles: Milligan Books. ISBN 1-881524-47-7.
- Gates, Henry Louis; Brooks Higginbotham, Evelyn, eds. (2008). Frances E. Williams. Oxford University Press & Harvard University's W.E.B. Du Bois Institute.
- Southern California Library for Social Studies and Research – Africanactivist.msc-edu/organization.
