= The Notorious Elinor Lee =

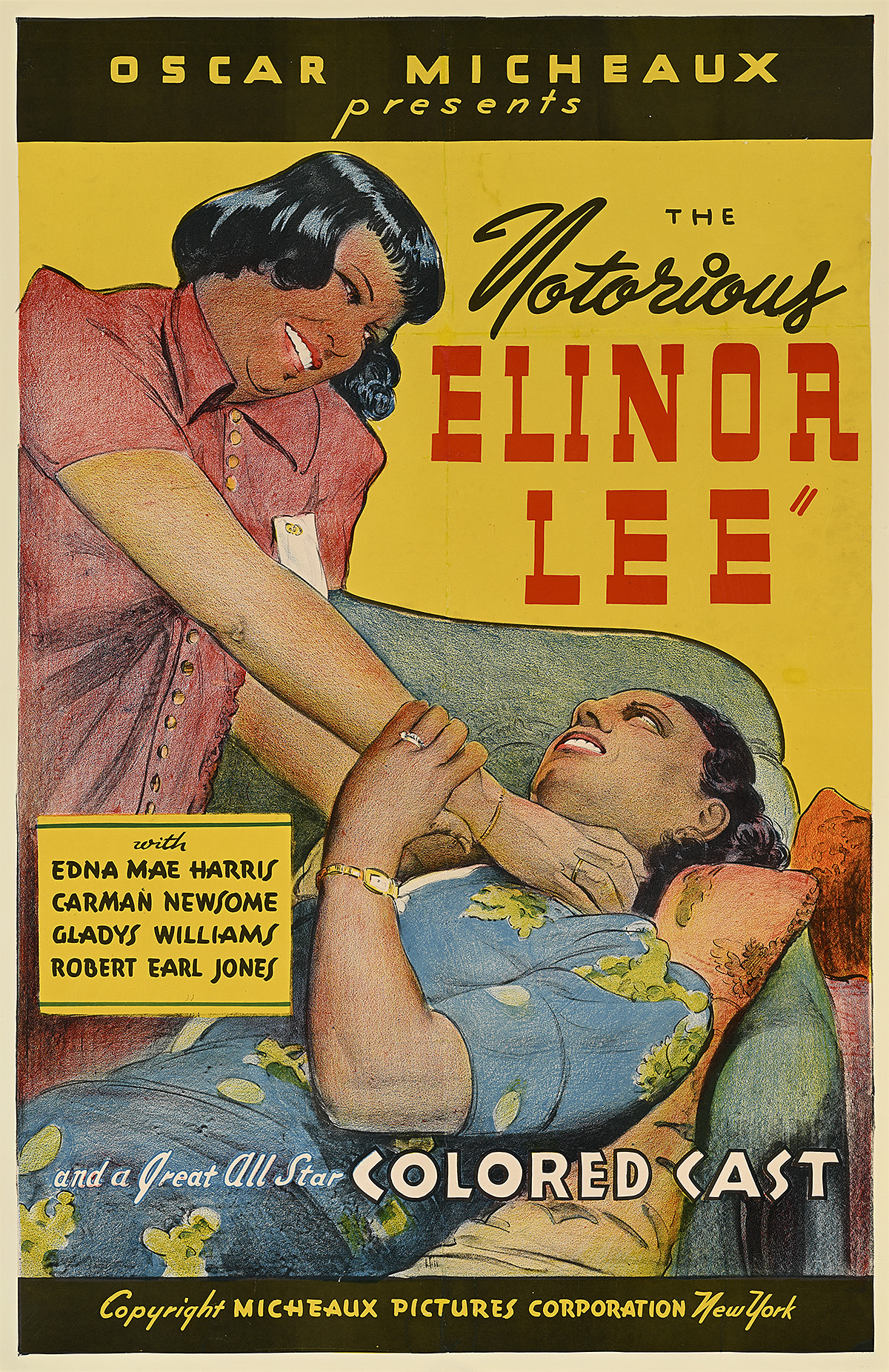
- Poster for initial theatrical release
- Directed by: Oscar Micheaux
- Written by: Oscar Micheaux
- Produced by: Oscar Micheaux; Alfred N. Sack
- Starring: Gladys Williams; Robert Earl Jones; Edna Mae Harris
- Cinematography: Lester Lang
- Edited by: Leonard Weiss
- Distributed by: Sack Amusement Enterprises
- Release date: January 15, 1940 (USA)
- Running time: 107 minutes
- Country: United States
- Language: English

The Notorious Elinor Lee is a 1940 race film directed, written, and co-produced by the African-American filmmaker Oscar Micheaux.

== Plot ==
Elinor Lee, a gangster’s moll living in the Harlem section of New York City, has signed up-and-coming boxer Benny Blue to a 10-year contract. Lee and a pair of corrupt fight promoter scheme to build up Blue as a potential champion, with the goal of betting against him when they force him to take a dive in a champion fight. Lee conspires to hire Fredi, an old friend of Blue and an escaped convict hiding from the law, to be his sweetheart and to control him for Lee and her partners.

The plans are derailed when Blue loses a key fight to a German boxer, but he works to regain his standing in the sport and is able to meet the German in a rematch after two years have passed. Lee and her partners bet against Blue, but they are financially ruined when Blue prevails in the fight and comes out the winner.

== Production ==
The Notorious Elinor Lee was shot at Biograph Studios in The Bronx, New York. The film’s production was covered by Time magazine, which described filmmaker Micheaux as a “thickset, mild-mannered, chocolate-colored producer.”

Robert Earl Jones was cast as Benny Blue, with Edna Mae Harris as Fredi and Gladys Williams, who was also cast in Micheaux’s Lying Lips, as Elinor Lee. Two African-American actors with Hollywood careers beyond race films had smaller roles: Oscar Polk, who was best known for playing the servant Pork in Gone with the Wind (1939), and Juano Hernandez, the Puerto Rico-born star of the drama Intruder in the Dust (1949).

Hubert Julian, the pioneering African-American aviator, was an associate producer for the film. Julian announced plans to produce a series of films with Micheaux, including a biography on Julian's aviation career, but only collaborated with him on The Notorious Elinor Lee.

== Release ==
The film had its premiere in Harlem on January 15, 1940. Julian served as the master of ceremonies at the gala opening. Wearing formal clothing including a top hat, white silk gloves and an Inverness cape, Julian cautioned the opening night audience on the film's lack of polish by stating: "Don’t expect the perfection of a Hollywood picture, but know that we’ve done our very best."

The Notorious Elinor Lee was Micheaux’s penultimate film production. He would make one final feature, The Betrayal (1948).

== See also ==
- List of films in the public domain in the United States
