= Lying Lips =

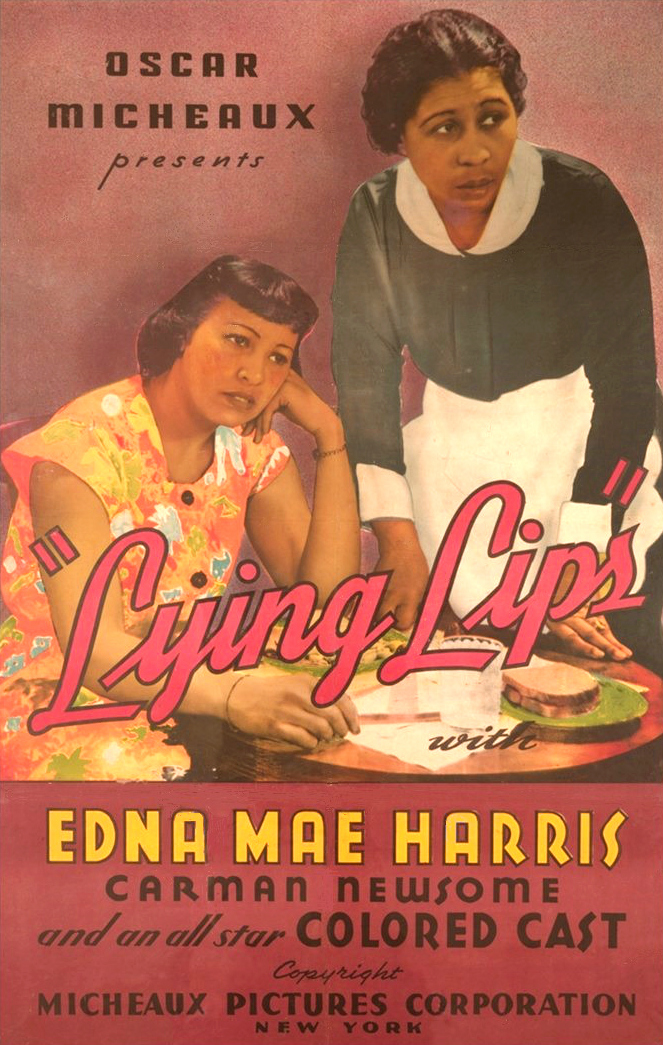
- Movie poster
- Directed by: Oscar Micheaux
- Written by: Oscar Micheaux
- Produced by: Hubert Julian; Oscar Micheaux
- Starring: Edna Mae Harris; Carman Newsome; Robert Earl Jones
- Cinematography: Lester Lang
- Edited by: Leonard Weiss
- Music by: Jack Shilkret
- Production company: Micheaux Film Corporation
- Distributed by: Sack Amusement Enterprises
- Release date: 1939
- Running time: 60 mins
- Country: United States
- Language: English

Lying Lips is a 1939 American melodrama race film written and directed by Oscar Micheaux who co-produced the film with aviator Hubert Fauntlenroy Julian, starring Edna Mae Harris, and Robert Earl Jones (the father of James Earl Jones). Lying Lips was the thirty-seventh film of Micheaux. The film was shot at the Biograph Studios in New York City.

== Plot ==
Elsie, a popular nightclub singer, refuses to go out with the customers at the request of the white owner of the club. The owner decides to get Benjamin, the black manager of the club, to talk to Elsie and try to persuade her to cooperate. Benjamin refuses and quits his job. Benjamin tells Elsie of his conversation with the owner and persuades Elsie to stay on because she is popular and can make a lot of money, but he warns her to be careful. Elsie stays, but still refuses to date the customers. Later, the owner hires John and Clyde, Elsie's uncles, to replace Benjamin. One evening, after the club closes, Elsie goes home and finds at her horror that her aunt, who lives with her, is dead. She calls the police and they discover that her aunt has been murdered by a single blow in the head. The police question Elsie and do not believe her story, so they arrest her for the death of her aunt.

John and Clyde testify that they saw Elsie on the night of the murder leaving the club for a short time and later returning. Mrs. Green, the sister of Clyde and John, tells the police that Elsie bought a large life insurance policy on her aunt, with herself as the beneficiary. With this evidence, Elsie is convicted of the crime and sent to prison. Benjamin, who has now become a detective on the police force, and Detective Wanzer, who is a close friend of Elsie's, do not believe that she is guilty and set out to find the real killer. After some investigation, they learn that Mrs. Green's husband was actually in love with Elsie's aunt. With jealousy as a possible motive, Benjamin and Wanzer now suspect that Mrs. Green and her two sons are connected with the crime.

One night they confront John and accuse him of the murder. John refuses to confess, so Benjamin and Wanzer take him to Tolston's Castle, which is supposed to be haunted. There they threaten to tie him up and leave him at the mercy of the ghosts. Terrified, John decides to tell all. He reveals the story of his sister's family, and tells them how her husband was tricked into marrying her. He told them that Mrs. Green's husband was in love with Elsie's aunt when they lived in the South. The husband, after realizing the trick, ran north, but Mrs. Green pursued him, and her two brothers threatened him to get back together with her. Although he stayed at home after that, Mrs. Green's husband continued to see Elsie's aunt and threatened to leave Mrs. Green.

John continues, and admits that he and Clyde lied about seeing Elsie leave the club on the night of the murder. Furthermore, he tells that early in the evening on the night of the murder Mrs. Green found a note left by her husband. The note stated that, out of despair, he had decided to kill Elsie's aunt and then take his own life by jumping off a bridge into the river. John also relates that it was Mrs. Green's plan to frame Elsie for the crime. The police recover Mrs. Green's husband's body from the river, verifying John's story. On this new evidence, Elsie is granted a pardon by the Governor and released from prison. Out of deep gratitude and love, Elsie marries Benjamin, who has been in love with her all the time.

== Cast ==
- Edna Mae Harris: Elsie Bellwood
- Carman Newsome: Benjamin Hadnott
- Robert Earl Jones: Detective Wanzer
- Frances Williams: Elizabeth Green
- Cherokee Thornton: "John"
- "Slim" Thompson: "Clyde"
- Gladys Williams: Aunt Josephine
- Juano Hernández: Reverend Bryson
- Henry "Gang" Gines: "Ned" Green
- Don De Leo: Farina
- Charles Latorre: Garotti
- Robert Paquin: District Attorney
- George Reynolds: Lt. of Police
- Amanda Randolph: Matron
- Teddy Hall: Boy
- Dorothy Van Engle
