= Robert Earl Jones =

American actor (1910–2006)

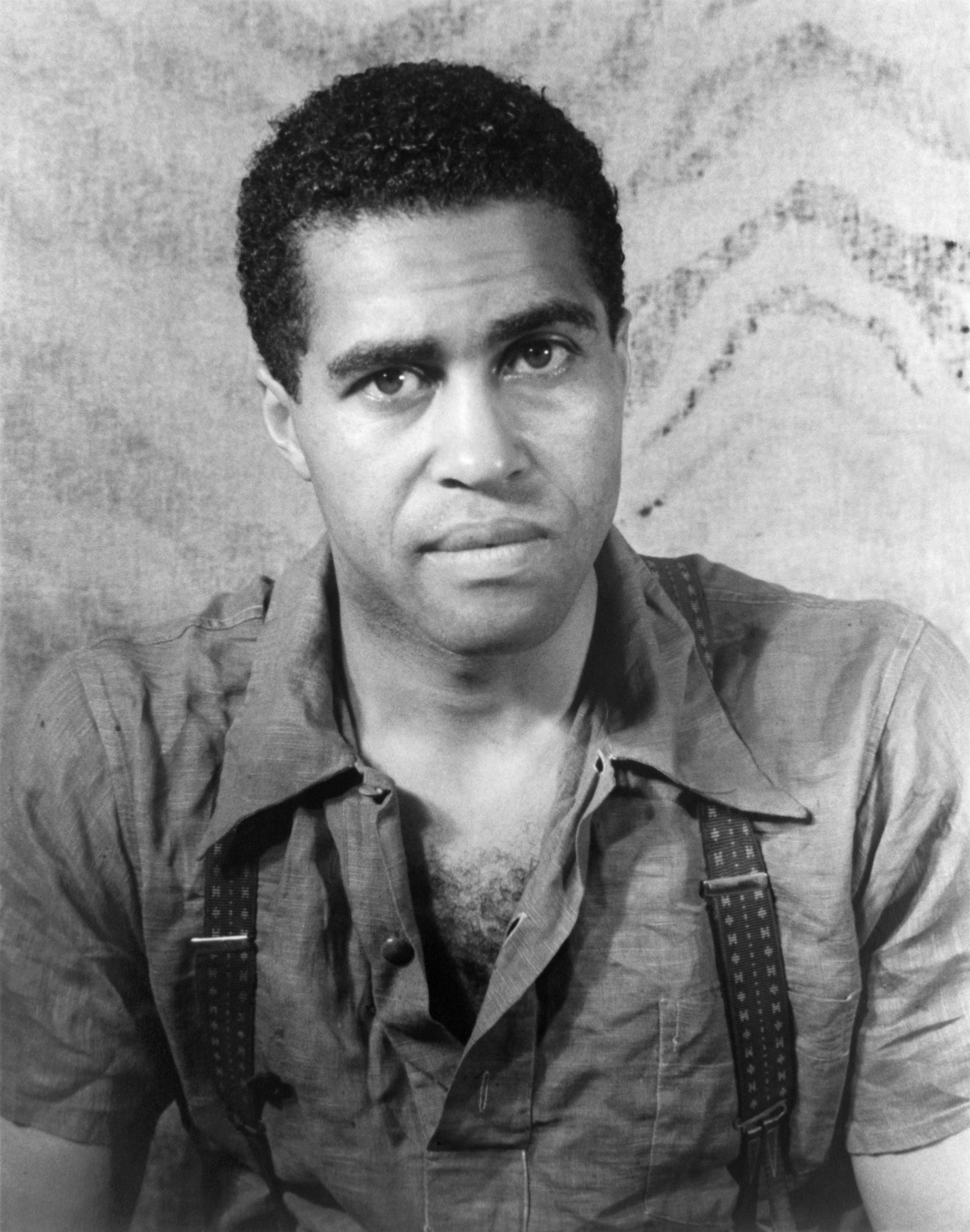
- Jones in 1938
- Born: February 3, 1910; Tate County, Mississippi, U.S.
- Died: September 7, 2006 (aged 96); Englewood, New Jersey, U.S.
- Other name: Earl Jones
- Occupation: Actor
- Years active: 1938–1993
- Spouses: Ruth Connolly (m. 1929; div. 1934) Jumelle Jones (m. 1938; div. 1950) Ruth Williams (m. 1960; died 1981)
- Children: 2, including James

Robert Earl Jones (February 3, 1910 – September 7, 2006), sometimes credited as Earl Jones, was an American actor. One of the first prominent Black film stars, Jones was a living link with the Harlem Renaissance of the 1920s and 1930s, having worked with Langston Hughes early in his career. He was also the father of actor James Earl Jones.

Jones was a leading man in race films such as Lying Lips (1939) and The Notorious Elinor Lee (1940), both directed by Oscar Micheaux, and a stage actor on Broadway. Later in his career, he played supporting roles in films such as The Sting (1973), Sleepaway Camp, Trading Places (both 1983), The Cotton Club (1984), and Witness (1985).

== Early life ==
Jones was born in northwestern Mississippi; the exact location is uncertain since some sources indicate Senatobia, while others suggest nearby Coldwater. A son of Robert and Elnora Jones, Robert Earl Jones left school at an early age to work as a sharecropper to help his family. He later became a professional boxer. Under the ring name "Battling Bill Stovall", he was a sparring partner of Joe Louis. BoxRec lists two professional bouts by Jones, both in July 1926.

== Career ==
Jones became interested in theater after he moved to Chicago, as one of the thousands leaving the South in the Great Migration. He moved on to New York by the 1930s. He worked with young people in the Works Progress Administration, the largest New Deal agency, through which he met Langston Hughes, a young poet and playwright. Hughes cast him in his 1938 play, Don't You Want to Be Free?

Jones also entered the film business, appearing in more than twenty films. His film career started with the leading role of a detective in the 1939 race film Lying Lips, written and directed by Oscar Micheaux, and Jones made his next screen appearance in Micheaux's The Notorious Elinor Lee (1940). Jones acted mostly in crime movies and dramas after that, with such highlights as Wild River (1960) and One Potato, Two Potato (1964). In the Oscar-winning 1973 film The Sting, he played Luther Coleman, an aging grifter whose con is requited with murder leading to the eponymous "sting". In the later 20th century, Jones appeared in several other noted films: Trading Places (1983) and Witness (1985).

Toward the end of his life, Jones was noted for his stage portrayal of Creon in The Gospel at Colonus (1988), a black musical version of the Oedipus legend. He also appeared in episodes of the long-running TV shows Lou Grant and Kojak. One of his last stage roles was in a 1991 Broadway production of Mule Bone by Hughes and Zora Neale Hurston, another important writer of the Harlem Renaissance. His last film was Rain Without Thunder (1993).

Although blacklisted by the House Un-American Activities Committee in the 1950s due to involvement with leftist groups, Jones was ultimately honored with a lifetime achievement award by the U.S. National Black Theatre Festival.

== Personal life ==
Jones was married three times. As a young man, he married Ruth Connolly (died 1986) in 1931; they had a son, James Earl Jones. Jones and Connolly separated before James was born in 1931, and the couple divorced in 1933. Jones did not come to know his son until the mid-1950s. Jones remarried twice, to Jumelle Jones from 1938 to 1950, and Ruth Williams from 1960 until her death in 1981. He had a second son, Matthew Earl Jones.

=== Death ===
Jones died on September 7, 2006, in Englewood, New Jersey, at age 96.

== Filmography ==
Year	Title	Role	Notes
1939	Lying Lips	Detective Wenzer	
1940	The Notorious Elinor Lee	Benny Blue	
1959	Odds Against Tomorrow	Club Employee	Uncredited
1960	Wild River	Sam Johnson	Uncredited
1960	The Secret of the Purple Reef	Tobias	
1964	Terror in the City	Farmer	
1964	One Potato, Two Potato	William Richards	
1971	Mississippi Summer	Performer	
1973	The Sting	Luther Coleman	
1974	Cockfighter	Buford	
1977	Proof of the Man	Wilshire Hayward	
1982	Cold River	The Trapper	
1983	Trading Places	Attendant	
1983	Sleepaway Camp	Ben	
1984	The Cotton Club	Stage Door Joe	
1984	Billions for Boris	Grandaddy	
1985	Witness	Custodian	
1988	Starlight: A Musical Movie	Joe	
1990	Maniac Cop 2	Harry	
1993	Rain Without Thunder	Old Lawyer	

=== Television ===
Year	Title	Role	Notes
1964	The Defenders	Joe Dean	Episode: The Brother Killers
1976	Kojak	Judge	Episode: Where to Go if you Have Nowhere to Go?
1977	The Displaced Person	Astor	Television movie
1978	Lou Grant	Earl Humphrey	Episode: Renewal
1979	Jennifer's Journey	Reuven	Television movie
1980	Oye Ollie	Performer	Television series
1981	The Sophisticated Gents	Big Ralph Joplin	3 episodes
1982	One Life to Live		
1985	Great Performances	Creon	Episode: The Gospel at Colonus
1990	True Blue	Performer	Episode: Blue Monday

== Partial stage credits ==
Year	Title	Role	Venue
1945	The Hasty Heart	Blossom	Hudson Theatre, Broadway
1945	Strange Fruit	Henry McIntosh	Royale Theatre, Broadway
1948	Volpone	Commendatori	New York City Center
1948	Set My People Free	Ned Bennett	Hudson Theatre, Broadway
1949	Caesar and Cleopatra	Nubian Slave	National Theatre, Broadway
1952	Fancy Meeting You Again	Second Nubian	Royale Theatre, Broadway
1956	Mister Johnson	Moma	Martin Beck Theater, Broadway
1962	Infidel Caesar	Soldier	Music Box Theater, Broadway
1962	The Moon Besieged	Shields Green	Lyceum Theatre, Broadway
1968	More Stately Mansions	Cato	Broadhurst Theatre, Broadway
1975	All God's Chillun Got Wings	Street Person	Circle in the Square Theatre, Broadway
1975	Death of a Salesman	Charley	Circle in the Square Theatre, Broadway
1977	Unexpected Guests	Man	Little Theatre, Broadway
1988	The Gospel at Colonus	Creon	Lunt-Fontanne Theatre, Broadway
1991	Mule Bone	Willie Lewis	Ethel Barrymore Theatre, Broadway
