= Margot Webb =

- Born: Marjorie Smith; 18 March 1910; Harlem, New York, U.S.
- Died: 5 April 2005 (aged 95)
- Occupations: Professional Dancer (1922-1947), Teacher
- Spouse(s): William P. Webb, Jr

Margot Webb (18 March 1910 – 5 April 2005) was a professional dancer trained in ballet, waltz, tango, and bolero. She and her dance partner, Harold Norton, were one of the first African American ballroom teams and were known professionally as “Norton and Margot”.

Webb and Norton toured through the East and Midwest United States and parts of Europe — including France, Italy, and Germany — with the Cotton Club Revue and the Continental Variety show. As a black team, they were not frequently booked and had trouble making a living in a white world. Like many African American performers and artists at this time, Norton and Margot were unnoticed and undocumented by white audiences, however they did receive regular coverage in various newspapers and magazines in the 1930s and 1940s. They opened a studio in 1936 in Harlem which had to close by 1938 because of their busy touring schedules and inability to make money. The end of the swing era ended their career because of the decline in demand for their act.

== Early life ==
Margot Webb was born on 18 March 1910 — as Marjorie Smith — and grew up in Harlem as a native New Yorker. She danced part-time through high school. She attended Hunter College until she dropped out to pursue dancing full-time and became a headline dancer in the Cotton Club from 1933-1939. Webb studied ballet at the Louis Chalif studios in midtown Manhattan. She remembers being taken to a child audition for a Nora Bayes production.

== Personal life ==
Webb came from a family that was involved in the entertainment industry in some way or form. Her father was George Mitchell Smith, a classical violinist who also taught the saxophone and clarinet. He traveled with the James Reese European Fifteenth Regiment Band during World War One and stayed in England and France, eventually abandoning his family. Through the connections of show business, Webb learned that her father was alive many years later and still performing in Europe. Her mother, Gertrude Violet Fay Bush, was a pianist in nightclubs. Webb also had three maternal aunts in show business named Sarah (Sadie) Bush Tapan, Ethel Bush Alan, and Marion Bush Stubbs. Sarah was a singer and dancer, Ethel was a seamstress for Broadway actresses, and Marion was a personal maid for actresses. Webb's grandmother Ada Lee Bush was also employed by broadway actresses. Webb also had a brother named George and they grew up following the Catholic faith. When she started her family with her husband in the 50s, they moved to the suburbs, where she became a junior high teacher in Harlem. Her whereabouts were unknown until she was found to be a gym teacher in Miami, Florida in the 2000s.

== Career ==
She began touring starting in the African American vaudeville circuit in the East and Midwest: New York to Philadelphia, Baltimore and Washington, D.C., and from Chicago to Points-west, as well as theaters in Harlem. Webb's solo work included jazz toe dance (en pointe), yet her favorite couple dance had always been the waltz. In 1933, while at one of her dance performances, she met Harold Norton. Soon after their meeting, they became ballroom dance partners professionally known as “Norton and Margot.”

In 1937, Norton and Margot toured Europe, first touring as part of the Cotton Club Revue, then as an independent act on Continental variety shows. During this time and after, they received regular coverage in the 1930s and 1940s in magazines and newspapers such as the African American Press, the Amsterdam News, the Norfolk Journal and Guide, the Pittsburgh Courier, and the Chicago Defender. They also performed in London, Paris and Germany before WWII. An African American press described Norton and Margot as “the team who broke the Jim-Crow barrier of Hitler.” When Hitler banned non-Aryans, the team was given a free boat ride home from Hamburg, after being expelled from Germany in December 1937.

In 1936, Norton and Margot opened a dance studio in central Harlem. They taught classes for children and adults and also choreographed routines, often for white nightclub performers. While the team was on tour, their duties were shared by other performers and teachers associated with the studio. Because of their busy schedules they had difficulty making money from the studio and so the school closed in 1938.

While they were touring from June to August in 1937, Norton and Margot were also a part of the Cotton Club Revue, which toured abroad with the Teddy Hill Band. They performed at the London Palladium, the Moulin Rouge and the Théâtre des Ambassadeurs in Paris.

After that tour, there were fewer bookings for the “Norton and Margot” team. To make some money, Webb began performing in ballroom shows in 1940 with Al Moore, a fellow dancer. She returned to Hunter College to work on a bachelor's degree in French. During this time, Webb married William P. Webb Jr. In addition, she worked with another dancer, named Al Vigal, in an “exotic” act that ran for an extended engagement in Montreal.

Norton and Webb continued to perform at Dave's Cafe in Chicago and tour nightclubs in the Midwest in 1940. However, by this time the Midwest white vaudeville theatre circuit started to decline employment for African Americans. The theatres became film houses, showing two-feature films, newsreels, cartoons, and so on. On their return from the Midwest, the team toured the Northeast African American vaudeville circuit.

Webb continued to dance professionally from 1942 to 1945 by working as a soloist and as the occasional ballroom partner of Al Moore. Her solo work included a "La Conga" specialty and a jazz toe dance (a jazz dance en pointe). Both were performed at the Apollo theatre in Harlem, but the duo received less and less recognition and bookings so the team dissolved and Webb retired from show business. However, Norton and Webb staged a comeback from 1946 to 1947 to try to regain their name. They opened Harlem's “Club Baron” in September, 1946, but only got a few bookings afterwards. As a result, the team disbanded permanently in early 1947. Webb entered graduate school at Columbia University's Teachers College, and went on to teach at Catholic colleges and public schools.

Webb's career continued to progress, doing a number of oral interviews with Brenda Dixon Gottschild in the late 1970s and 1980s about her performance career and experiences as a black dancer.

=== Forging a career in a white entertainment field ===
Webb and Norton's career was emblematic of the struggles, frustrations, double standards and paradoxes that existed in the United States for African American artists. Having adopted styles and techniques considered within the “Europeanist” genre, Webb and Norton faced many struggles traveling the white road to success in the entertainment field. As stated in the book, Waltzing in the Dark : African American Vaudeville and Race Politics in the Swing Era - Chapter 2 written by Brenda Dixon Gottschild, an American cultural historian choreographer, performer, and anti-racist cultural worker, Webb modified her name from Marjorie to Margot, adding the “t” for a more “Latin” effect as she realized that in the current state of the anti-black and racist environment, Latin performers would have a better chance of being hired than an African American performer. In many cases, Webb and Norton both had to masquerade their true identity, often presenting themselves as “hispanic” to be hired. It was also stated in Gottschild's book, Chapter 5, that “race, caste, and color undeniably affected the African American performer touring nationwide and in Europe during the swing era.” However, it was because Norton and Margot entered the entertainment field performing styles and techniques that weren't mainstream with what was conventionally associated as “Black dance” (Lindy Hoppers, tap dances, exotic dances), that they succeeded by “adhering to repertory which acknowledged the accepted stereotypes of a society based on racial discrimination and segregation.” It was also in this way that they would have gained more opportunities in white show business if they had complied to “black dance” structures. The rarity of having an African American ballroom dancing team was a radical move for this era that brought questions of race and gender to the field of dance.

== See also ==
- Performed with musicians Chick Webb, Roy Eldridge, Earl Hines, Teddy Hill, Noble Sissle, and Louis Armstrong
