= Edna Mae Harris =

American actress (1910–1997)

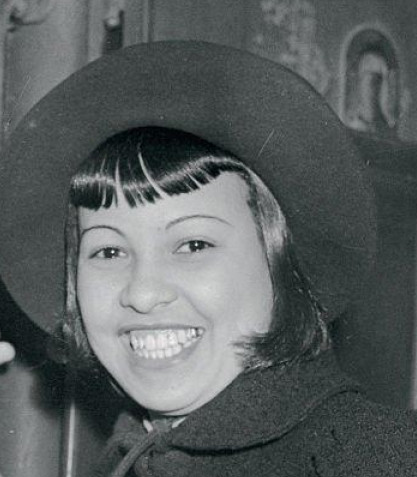
- Harris in 1937
- Born: September 29, 1914; New York City, U.S.
- Died: September 15, 1997 (aged 82); New York City, U.S.
- Occupations: Actress; singer
- Years active: 1931–1945
- Spouses: Edward Randolph (m. 1933; div. 1938) Walter Anderson (m. 1951; died 1983)

Edna Mae Harris (September 29, 1914 – September 15, 1997), sometimes credited as Edna May Harris, was an American actress and singer. Harris, an African–American, was a film actress in the late 1930s and early 1940s, appearing in films featuring mostly African–American casts.

== Biography ==
=== Early life and career ===
Harris was born in Harlem, New York; her father, Sam, was a boxer and customs inspector, and her mother Mary Harris (née Walker) worked as a maid. Harris's family is noted as one of the first families to have migrated to Harlem. Settling near the Lafayette Theater, Harris was convinced to pursue a career in show business by Ethel Waters and Maud Russell, who were frequent visitors to her family home. After being coached in singing and dancing by Waters and Russell, Harris began performing in the Theater Owners Booking Association (TOBA), an African-American vaudeville circuit with which Harris performed from 1929 until 1933.

Harris attended Wadleigh High School (later known as Wadleigh High School for Girls) in Manhattan. After her sophomore year of high school, Alhambra Theater hired her.

=== Career ===
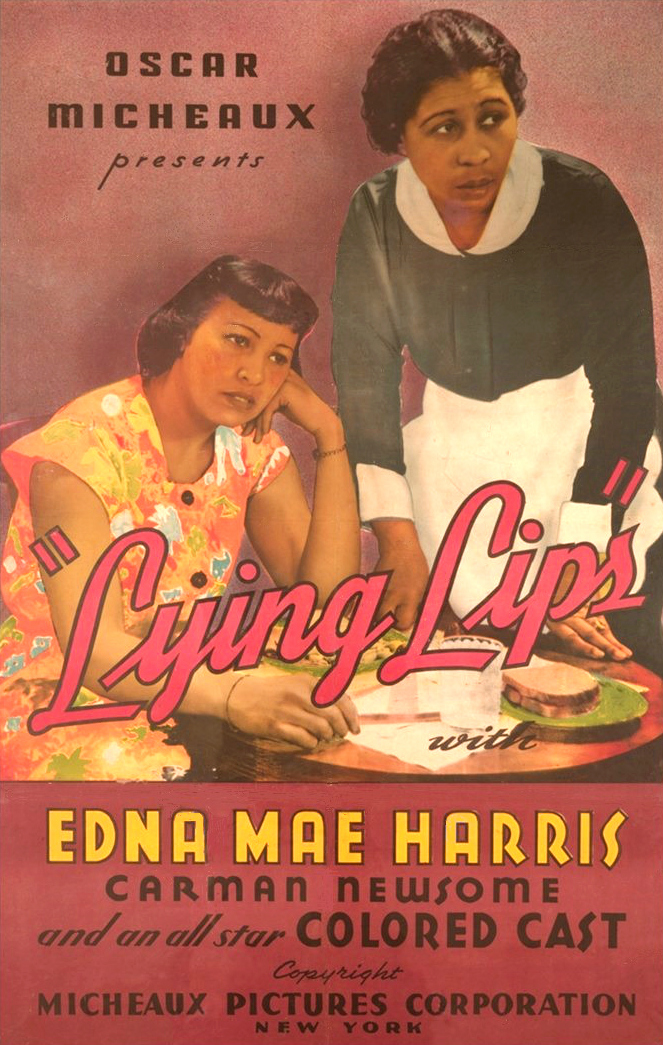
Harris (left) on poster for Lying Lips (1939.)

Harris began her acting career with The Green Pastures (1936), starring with Eddie 'Rochester' Anderson. Harris was a leading lady in Spirit of Youth (1938), the story of the rise of boxer Joe Thomas, which paralleled the life of Joe Louis. Harris also had leading roles in Oscar Micheaux films, Lying Lips (1939), and The Notorious Elinor Lee (1940), and the independent film Paradise in Harlem in 1939. She appeared in Run, Little Chillun and sang for Noble Sissle's Orchestra. Edna Mae Harris got to tell her story in her later years in the documentary, Midnight Ramble (1994), about independently produced black films.

=== Personal life and death ===
Harris was married twice and had no children. Her first marriage was to Edward Randolph from 1933 until 1938, then to Harlem nightclub owner, Walter Anderson, from 1951 until his death in 1983. Harris dated boxer Joe Louis sometime during 1939 and 1940. Harris also dated Robert Paquin, who co-starred with her in Lying Lips, from 1941 until 1942. Harris died of a heart attack on September 15, 1997, at the age of 82.

== Filmography ==
Movie	Role	Year
American Experience: Midnight Ramble	as Herself	1994
Pass the Biscuits Mirandy!	Mirandy (uncredited)	1943
Stage Door Canteen	Sun Tan Girl (uncredited)	1943
Legs Ain't No Good	Actress	1942
Murder on Lenox Avenue	Singer	1941
Stolen Paradise	Maid (billed as Edna May Harris)	1940
Sunday Sinners	Corrine Aiken	1940
The Notorious Elinor Lee	Fredi Welsh	1940
Paradise in Harlem	Doll Davis	1939
Lying Lips	Elsie Bellwood	1939
Spirit of Youth	Mary Bowdin	1938
The Garden of Allah	Oasis Girl (uncredited)	1936
The Green Pastures	Zeba (as Edna May Harris)	1936
Bullets or Ballots	Rose - Lee's Maid (uncredited)	1936
Fury	Black Woman (uncredited)	1936
Private Number	Lulu (uncredited)	1936
