= Old Ironsides (film) =

1926 film by James Cruze

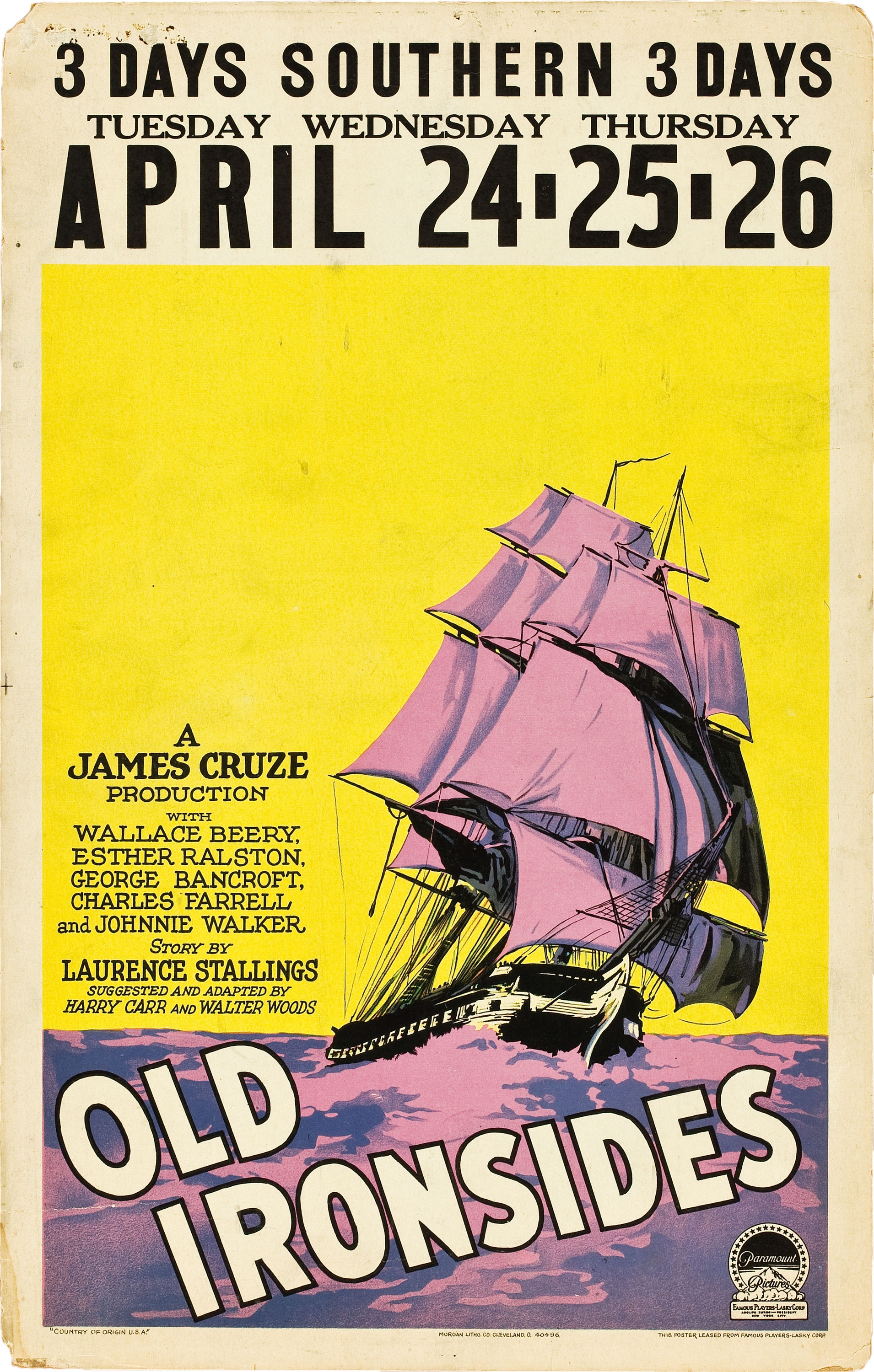
- Film poster
- Directed by: James Cruze
- Written by: Dorothy Arzner; Harry Carr; Walter Woods (scenario); Rupert Hughes (intertitles)
- Starring: Charles Farrell; Esther Ralston; Wallace Beery; George Bancroft
- Cinematography: Alfred Gilks
- Music by: Hugo Riesenfeld; J. S. Zamecnik
- Distributed by: Paramount Pictures
- Release date: December 6, 1926
- Running time: 111 minutes
- Country: United States
- Language: Silent (English intertitles)
- Box office: $1.1 million (U.S. and Canada rentals)

Old Ironsides is a 1926 American silent historical war film directed by James Cruze and starring Charles Farrell, Esther Ralston, Wallace Beery, George Bancroft and Boris Karloff in a small role. It was produced and distributed by Paramount Pictures.

Old Ironsides (1926)

== Plot ==
Old Ironsides opens in 1797 in Philadelphia, Pennsylvania, with General Charles Pinckney delivering a fiery patriotic speech against the depredations by North African pirates against American shipping. The scene then shifts to Boston, Massachusetts, for the launching of the heavy frigate USS Constitution. It became known later as "Old Ironsides" because cannon balls would bounce off its hull. The ship's midshipmen, all boys, line up for inspection by Commodore Edward Preble, the captain of the Constitution.

Meanwhile, at the docks in Salem, Massachusetts, the American merchant ship Esther is recruiting sailors, under the supervision of Bos'n. He signs on a country boy in search of adventure. At one point in 1803. while sailing in the Mediterranean Sea, the Esther is captured by the pirates; the pirates sell the crew into slavery and hold the captain for ransom.

By 1803, the United States is in the First Barbary War with the pirates of Algiers. Preble has sailed the Constitution and rest of the fleet to blockade Algiers. When the frigate USS Philadelphia becomes grounded outside Algiers, it is captured by the pirates. Lieutenant Stephen Decatur then leads a detachment of American Marines to retake the ship and then destroy it. During the confusion of battle, the crew of the Esther are able to escape Algerian captivity. The Americans are eventually victorious.

== Cast ==
- Charles Farrell as the boy
- Esther Ralston as the girl
- Wallace Beery as the bos'n
- George Bancroft as the gunner. A closeup of a tattoo on Bancroft's arm shows "G. Bancroft".
- Charles Hill Mailes as Commodore Edward Preble
- Johnnie Walker as Stephen Decatur
- Eddie Fetherston as Richard Somers
- George Godfrey as the cook
- William Conklin as Esther's father
- Nick De Ruiz as the bashaw
- Effie Ellsler as Esther's mother
- Frank Jonasson as pirate captain
- Duke Kahanamoku as pirate captain
- Boris Karloff as a Saracen guard
- Fred Kohler as second mate
- Harold Norton as sailor (uncredited)

Gary Cooper was in the film as an extra.

== Production ==
Wallace Beery as the bos'n

Old Ironsides was shot in a widescreen process that Paramount named "Magnascope". This process heightened the visual effects in the film at specific points by switching to a larger "widescreen". It was reported that at the premiere of Old Ironsides, the audience "stood up and cheered" when the Magnascope sequences appeared.

The film features battle scenes with sailing ships and pirates. The Maine-built ship Llewellyn J. Morse was refitted as the USS Constitution. A real1886 ship, the S. N. Castle, was used for the burning and sinking of the USS Philadelphia. This scene was filmed off Catalina Island in California.

Box office receipts from the premiere at the Rialto Theater in New York City went to the USS Constitution restoration fund. A novelisation of Old Ironsides by A.M.R. Wright, called Sons of the Sea, was published by The Readers Library to coincide with the release of the film in the United Kingdom.

== Availability ==
Paramount Studios released a VHS video tape edition of Old Ironsides in 1987. The Museum of Modern Art in New York City exhibited a restored 35mm print of the film in December 2008.

== See also ==
- List of American films of 1926
- Boris Karloff filmography
- Filmography of Wallace Beery
