= The Reckless Moment =

1949 film by Max Ophüls

- Theatrical release poster
- Directed by: Max Ophüls
- Screenplay by: Henry Garson; Robert Soderberg; Mel Dinelli (adaptation); Robert E. Kent (adaptation)
- Based on: Ladies Home Journal story "The Blank Wall" by Elisabeth Sanxay Holding
- Produced by: Walter Wanger
- Starring: James Mason; Joan Bennett
- Cinematography: Burnett Guffey
- Edited by: Gene Havlick
- Music by: Hans J. Salter
- Color process: Black and white
- Production company: Walter Wanger Productions
- Distributed by: Columbia Pictures
- Release date: December 29, 1949
- Running time: 82 minutes
- Country: United States
- Language: English
- Budget: $882,653
- Box office: $717,188

The Reckless Moment is a 1949 American noir melodrama film directed by Max Ophüls, produced by Walter Wanger, and released by Columbia Pictures with Burnett Guffey as cinematographer. It starred James Mason and Joan Bennett. The film is based on The Blank Wall (1947), a novel written by Elisabeth Sanxay Holding. The 2001 film The Deep End is a remake based on the same source material.

== Plot ==
While her husband is away on business, Lucia Harper leaves her home in Balboa Island and drives to Los Angeles to confront Darby, a low-life L.A. criminal, and demands he stop seeing her 17-year-old daughter, Bea. He agrees, but with the caveat that Lucia pay him. She responds by telling him he has simplified the situation, that when she tells Bea "how deeply you feel about her" the girl will be glad to break off with him.

When Lucia returns home she is confronted by Bea - Darby had telephoned to tell her of her mother's visit. She refuses to believe Darby would mention money in the manner her mother suggests happened.

Lucia forbids her daughter to see Darby again but, that evening, Bea sneaks out to the family's boathouse to meet him. She assures him she does not accept her mother's version of things, but he indicates he could do with some money and that it does not mean the two could not continue to be together. Bea is repulsed by this and, during an ensuing struggle, she hits him and he goes down to his knees. Unknown to her, he shakily tries to follow her but accidentally falls and subsequently dies.

Having discovered Bea missing, Lucia searches for her. When she comes upon the distraught girl, who has just come indoors after her ordeal and reveals it to her mother, Lucia goes to the boathouse; there is nothing amiss and she does not see Darby. The next morning, however, she finds him lying dead by a jetty. She uses a motorboat and disposes of the body in a swamp; it is found, and a murder investigation begins.

Another L.A. criminal, handsome and smooth-talking Donnelly, the partner of Nagel, a brutal loan shark, shows up in possession of letters Bea had written Darby. Nagel had loaned the now-deceased man money and has been holding the writings as collateral. Lucia must now come up with $5,000 to keep Bea's relationship from becoming known.

As Lucia struggles to secure these funds, Donnelly is falling in love with her. He tries to allow her more time, he tells her he has declined his 'cut' and that if she can get half the money, he may be able to mollify Nagel. If he could, he says, he would pay the blackmailer off himself.

After desperately pawning much of her jewelry, Lucia has only $800. When she meets Donnelly to hand this over, he announces that she is in the clear, a man has been arrested in relation to Darby's murder. Lucia is stricken with guilt because she knows Darby was not actually murdered; she tries to convince Donnelly that she is the killer. He will not accept her story and says that while the man in custody may be innocent of this he is "guilty of a hundred other things" and it does not matter, she needs to think of her family.

Later, Donnelly learns that the suspect has been released. When Lucia gets home, her housekeeper says Nagel is waiting in the boathouse. He lets her know the suspect has been "sprung" and that she must pay the full $5,000 immediately. Donnelly arrives and attacks his partner; during the fight, Donnelly is wounded but manages to strangle Nagel to death.

Afterwards, Donnelly talks about his warm feelings for Lucia; she says she will call the police and straighten everything out, she cannot allow him to spend the rest of his life wanted for murder. He asks her for a drink and, while she is gone, Donnelly drives away with Nagel in the car. Lucia follows in her vehicle. While driving, Donnelly reaches into Nagel's pocket to retrieve Bea's letters; he loses control, smashes through a fence and into a tree, overturning the car and trapping himself under it.

When Lucia finds him, he tells her to not assist him, it will be better if the authorities find him this way. He gives her the letters. At home, as Lucia is trying to compose herself, her two children return from an evening out. Her son talks about "seeing a terrible accident". Bea tells Lucia how the police mentioned that, just before dying, the man pinned beneath the vehicle admitted to killing Darby.

== Cast ==
- James Mason as Martin Donnelly
- Joan Bennett as Lucia Harper
- Geraldine Brooks as Bea Harper
- Henry O'Neill as Tom Harper
- Shepperd Strudwick as Ted Darby
- David Bair as David Harper
- Roy Roberts as Nagel
- Frances E. Williams as Sybil (uncredited)
- William Schallert as a police lieutenant (uncredited)
- Kathryn Card as a loan processor (uncredited)

== Production ==
This was Mason's third U.S. film, both from 1949, after having appeared in director Ophüls' Caught (released February 1949) then in Vincente Minnelli's Madame Bovary (released August 1949).

The Reckless Moment was filmed in both Balboa, Newport Beach and Los Angeles, California. It was first released in Detroit, Michigan, on October 29, 1949. While the movie was Ophüls' last to be shot in the United States, it was also the last movie adaptation of any of Elisabeth Sanxay Holding's books while she was alive. Other films based on her stories include Vocalizing (1936), The Bride Comes Home (1935), and The Price of Pleasure (1925).

Throughout the movie, major plot points often occur while the characters are simply doing day to day things. The characters are often put under duress while talking on the telephone or driving a car. This creates a contrast between the tension of the dialogue and the ease of the character's movements.

== Reception ==
=== Box-office ===
The film made a loss of $565,775.

=== Critical response ===
When the film was first released in December 29, 1949, the film critic for The New York Times, Bosley Crowther, praised the actors but wrote, "But it isn't all right with this picture. Although it is rather well staged, with credible location settings in Balboa and Los Angeles, it is a feeble and listless drama with a shamelessly callous attitude. The heroine gets away with folly, but we don't think this picture will."

In recent years, however, the film has received very positive appraisal and is now generally considered one of the best films by Max Ophüls. It has been highly regarded by film critics, historians and audience, and entered in the list of 1001 Movies You Must See Before You Die.

== Preservation ==
The Reckless Moment was preserved by the Academy Film Archive, in conjunction with Sony Pictures, in 1999.
