= The Breaking Point (1950 film) =

1950 film by Michael Curtiz

- Theatrical release poster
- Directed by: Michael Curtiz
- Screenplay by: Ranald MacDougall
- Based on: To Have and Have Not; 1937 novel by Ernest Hemingway
- Produced by: Jerry Wald
- Starring: John Garfield; Patricia Neal; Phyllis Thaxter; Juano Hernandez
- Cinematography: Ted D. McCord
- Edited by: Alan Crosland Jr.
- Music by: Max Steiner
- Production company: Warner Bros. Pictures
- Distributed by: Warner Bros. Pictures
- Release dates: September 15, 1950 (Los Angeles); October 6, 1950 (New York)
- Running time: 97 minutes
- Country: United States
- Language: English

The Breaking Point is a 1950 American film noir crime drama directed by Michael Curtiz and the second film adaptation of the 1937 Ernest Hemingway novel To Have and Have Not, the first one having featured Humphrey Bogart and Lauren Bacall. The film stars Patricia Neal and John Garfield in his penultimate film role.

== Plot ==
Harry Morgan is a sport-fishing boat captain whose business is on the skids and whose family is feeling the economic pinch. He begins to work with shady lawyer Duncan, who persuades him to smuggle eight Chinese men from Mexico into California in his boat, the Sea Queen. Harry also meets Leona Charles. When his plan with Duncan goes wrong, Harry comes even more under the influence of the lawyer, who blackmails him into helping the escape of a gang of crooks, who pull a racetrack heist, by using his fishing boat to move them away from authorities. Harry convinces himself that his illegal activities will financially help his family. His wife Lucy suspects that Harry is breaking the law and urges him to stop for the sake of the family, but Harry refuses.

As Harry waits for Duncan and the crooks on his boat, Harry's partner Wesley Park arrives. Not wanting Wesley around when the crooks arrive, Harry tries to send him on an errand. The crooks arrive before Wesley leaves and kill him. Harry is horrified, but is forced at gunpoint to transport the crooks out to open sea without drawing the attention of the Coast Guard. Harry also learns that Duncan was killed during the escape from the heist. Wesley's body is dumped overboard. Harry uses a ploy to gain access to two guns that he had hidden away prior to the journey and kills all of the crooks in a dramatic shootout, but Harry is critically wounded.

Authorities find the boat the next day and tow it to port. Lucy rushes to Harry's side and tries to convince him to allow his arm to be amputated to save his life. Speaking with difficulty, Harry reaffirms his love for Lucy and then closes his eyes. Paramedics arrive and carry Harry's motionless body into an ambulance. As they walk away from the wharf, Lucy pleads with the Coast Guard officer for assurance that Harry will live, but the officer says nothing. Wesley's son stands alone on the dock looking for his father.

== Cast ==
- John Garfield as Harry Morgan
- Patricia Neal as Leona Charles
- Phyllis Thaxter as Lucy Morgan
- Juano Hernández as Wesley Park
- Wallace Ford as F.R. Duncan
- Edmon Ryan as Rogers
- Ralph Dumke as Hannagan
- Guy Thomajan as Danny
- William Campbell as Concho
- Sherry Jackson as Amelia Morgan
- Donna Jo Boyce as Connie Morgan
- Victor Sen Yung as Mr. Sing

== Production ==
The film's producers assumed some risk with the casting of John Garfield in the lead role, as theater exhibitors nationwide had faced difficulty drawing audiences to his previous films. Hazel Brooks tested for the lead role that eventually was awarded to Patricia Neal, who had been suspended for several weeks by Warner Bros. Pictures after refusing to appear in Sugarfoot.

Filming began on March 27, 1950, with location shooting occurring in Newport Beach, California.

== Reception ==
In a contemporary review for The New York Times, critic Bosley Crowther described the film as "gripping and pictorially genuine" and wrote: "Warner Brothers, which already has taken one feeble swing and a cut at Ernest Hemingway's memorable story of a tough guy, 'To Have and Have Not,' finally has got hold of that fable and socked it for a four-base hit in a film called 'The Breaking Point' ... All of the character, color and cynicism of Mr. Hemingway's lean and hungry tale are wrapped up in this realistic picture, and John Garfield is tops in the principal role. ... [T]he Warners have got a picture that is a credit to all concerned. It may not be spiritually ennobling, but it is Hemingway. And it is pretty true to life."

Critic John L. Scott of the Los Angeles Times called the film "a taut, hard-driving melodrama" and wrote: "'The Breaking Point' is adult, make no mistake about that. It's no Cinderella story, with robbery, murder, smuggling of aliens and a woman of questionable morals (with a heart of gold) involved. But it's exciting movie entertainment, moving along at a lively clip with very few soft spots or draggy moments."

== Radio ==
The film was adapted for Australian radio in 1955. It was featured on the Turner Classic Movies show Noir Alley with Eddie Muller.
