= Sunday Sinners =

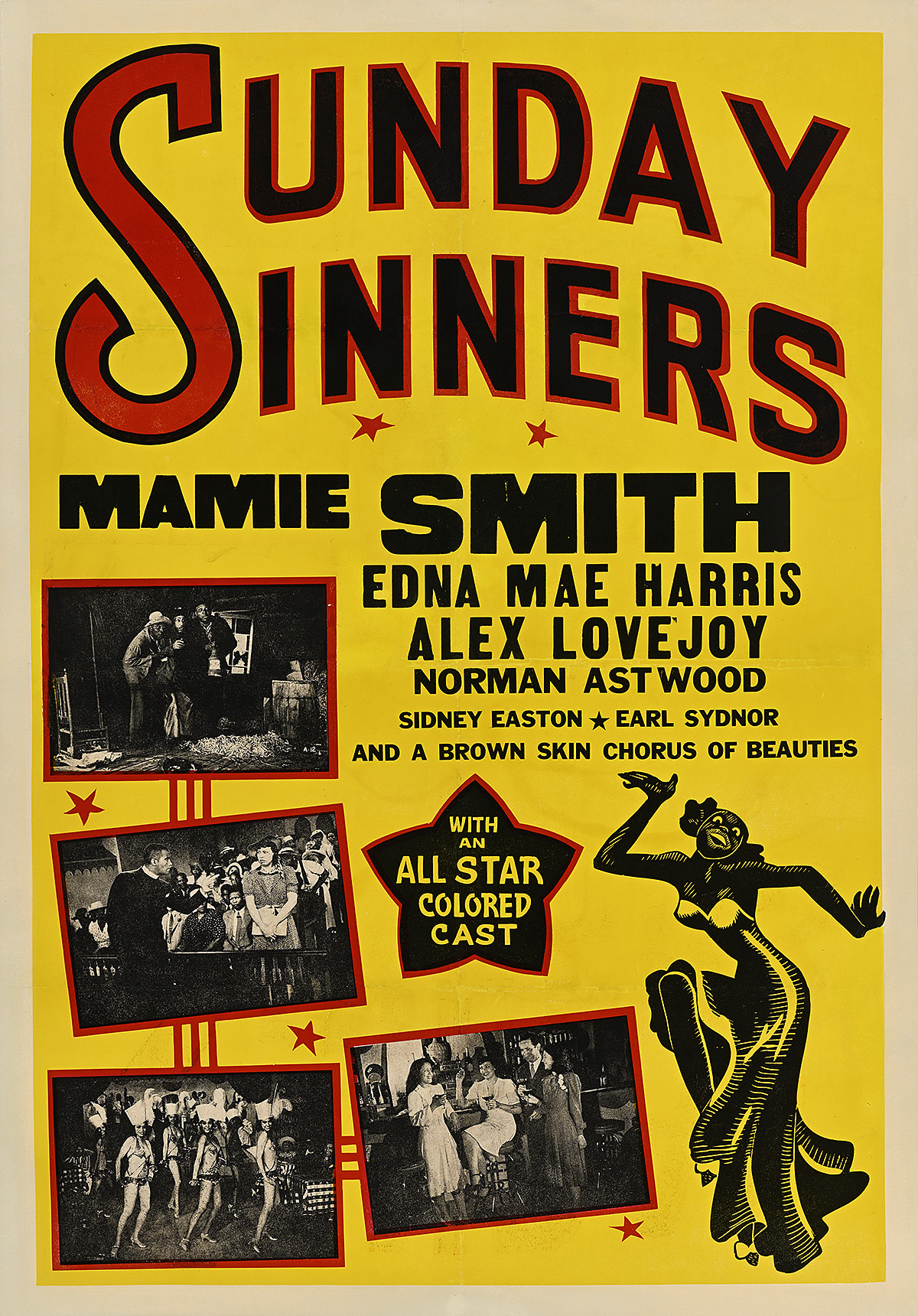
- One of several film posters for the original theatrical release
- Directed by: Arthur Dreifuss
- Written by: Vincent Valentini; Frank H. Wilson (story)
- Produced by: Jack Goldberg
- Starring: Norman Astwood; Edna Mae Harris; Earl Sydnor
- Production companies: Colonnade Pictures Corporation; Arthur Dreifuss Productions; Goldberg Productions
- Release date: 1940
- Running time: 65 min
- Country: United States
- Language: English

Sunday Sinners is a 1940 drama, comedy, musical and religious race film directed by and co-produced by Arthur Dreifuss and Jack Goldberg starring his wife Mamie Smith, Norman Astwood, Edna Mae Harris and Earl Sydnor.

== Plot ==
The Club Harlem is jointly owned by Gene and Corrine Aiken who disagree on the matter of the Club being open on Sunday. Rev. Jesse Hampton is receiving pressure from his parishioners to demand the club be closed on Sunday. Other plots include a protection racket pressuring Gene Aiken, two con men attempting to cheat a Chinese laundryman, and the son of the Reverend getting a job at the Club Harlem.

== Cast ==
- Norman Astwood as Gene Aiken
- Edna Mae Harris as Corrine Aiken
- Earl Sydnor as Reverend Jesse Hampton
- Mamie Smith as Midge
- Alec Lovejoy as Eli
- Cristola Williams as Creola
- Thelma Norton as Peggy Hampton
- Harold Norton as Earl Williams
- Augustus Smith as The Deacon
- Sidney Easton as Bootsie
