= Stars in My Crown (film) =

1950 film by Jacques Tourneur

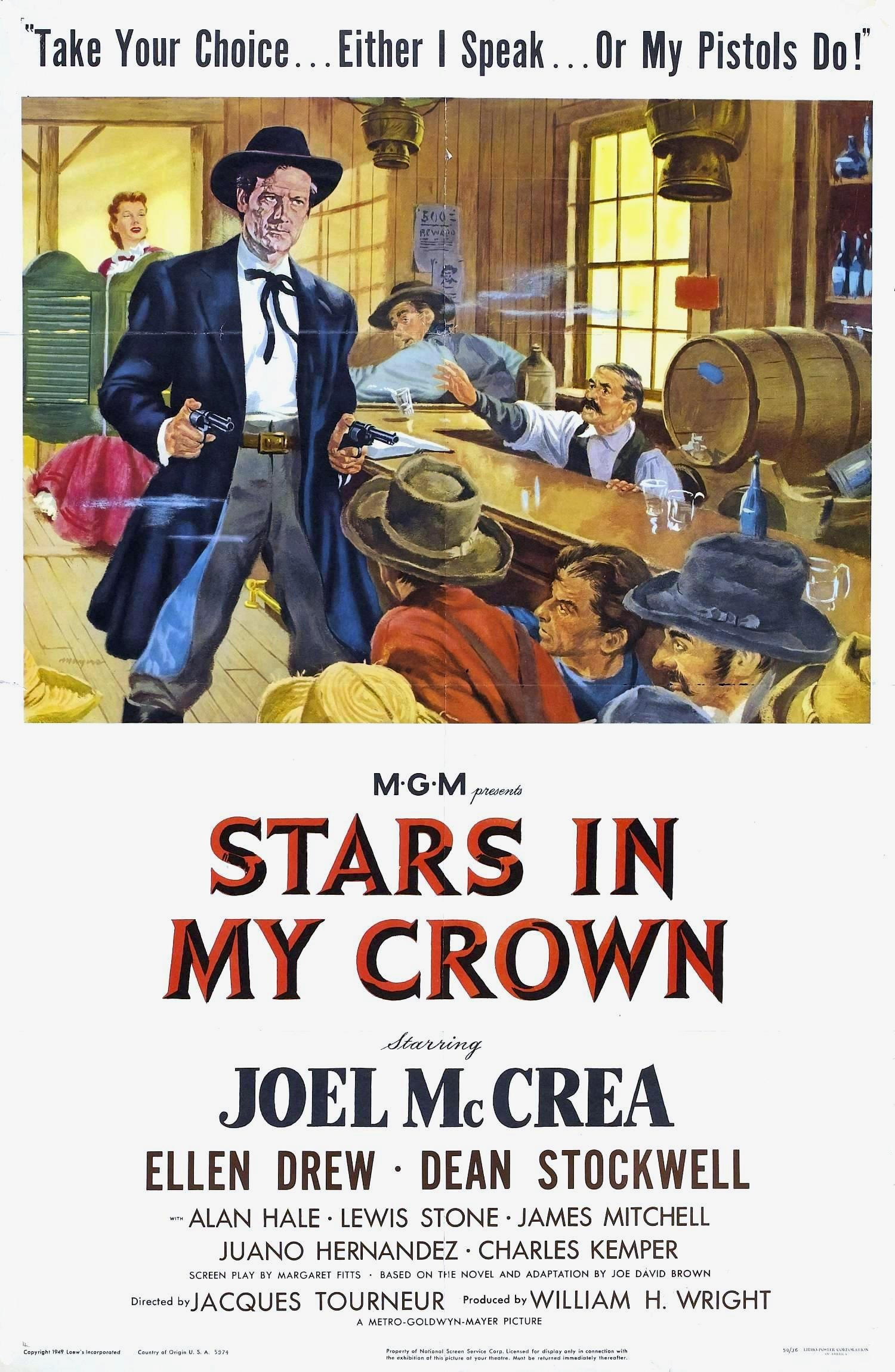
- Theatrical release poster
- Directed by: Jacques Tourneur
- Screenplay by: Margaret Fitts
- Based on: Stars in My Crown; 1947 novel by Joe David Brown
- Produced by: William H. Wright
- Starring: Joel McCrea; Ellen Drew; Dean Stockwell; Alan Hale; Lewis Stone; James Mitchell; Juano Hernandez; Charles Kemper
- Narrated by: Marshall Thompson
- Cinematography: Charles Schoenbaum
- Edited by: Gene Ruggiero
- Music by: Adolph Deutsch
- Distributed by: Metro-Goldwyn-Mayer
- Release date: May 11, 1950
- Running time: 89 minutes
- Country: United States
- Language: English
- Budget: $1,175,000
- Box office: $2,146,000

Stars in My Crown is a 1950 Western film directed by Jacques Tourneur and starring Joel McCrea as a preacher whose faith tames an unruly town by inspiring the townspeople to change. It was based on the 1947 novel of the same name by Joe David Brown.

== Plot ==
Shortly after the American Civil War, preacher Josiah Gray (Joel McCrea) arrives in the town of Walesburg. He heads straight for the saloon to give his first sermon. When the patrons laugh at him, he pulls out two guns, cowing the men into listening.

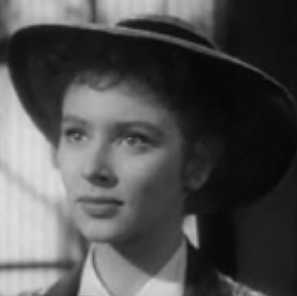
Amanda Blake as Faith Radmore Samuels

Josiah settles in and becomes a well-respected member of the community. The people build a church. He marries Harriet (Ellen Drew) and raises her orphan nephew John (Dean Stockwell). (The story is narrated by Marshall Thompson, as an adult John.)

When the beloved Dr. Harris, Sr. (Lewis Stone) dies, his place is taken by his son (James Mitchell), but the younger, unreligious man is not well-liked and wants to leave Walesburg. He falls in love with the schoolteacher, Faith Samuels (Amanda Blake). She is reluctant to marry him, as he insists on moving away.

John comes down with typhoid. Dr. Harris, Jr. warns Josiah to stay away from others, to avoid spreading the disease, but Josiah ignores him and soon, others are stricken, including Faith. When Harris blames Josiah, his faith is shaken; he closes the church and withdraws from the community. John recovers and discovers the cause was tainted well water. Harris's work on behalf of his patients forges a bond between Walesburg and him. When Faith seems to be dying, Harris summons the preacher. Josiah's prayers are answered; Faith recovers, and the man of science and the man of faith are reconciled.

Josiah is tested again. Leading businessman Lon Backett (Ed Begley) wants to buy the land of freed slave Uncle Famous Prill (Juano Hernandez). He needs the mica deposit to keep his mine in operation, but Uncle Famous refuses to sell. The out-of-work miners trample the old man's crops and scatter his livestock, yet he stubbornly holds out, and is given an ultimatum: get out or else. Josiah declines the armed assistance of his old war buddy, Jed Isbell (Alan Hale), and his sons (including an uncredited James Arness), and waits with Uncle Famous for the lynch mob to show up in their Ku Klux Klan costumes. Josiah offers no resistance, but asks the mob to first listen to him read Uncle Famous's will. With each item, he reminds the beneficiary of the old man's past kindness to that individual. Shamed, the mob disperses, with Lon Backett leading the way. Afterwards, John picks up the pages Josiah had read, and seeing nothing written on them, says that it is not a will. Josiah replies, "It's the will of God."

== Cast ==
- Joel McCrea as Josiah Doziah Gray
- Ellen Drew as Harriet Gray
- Dean Stockwell as John Kenyon
- Juano Hernandez as Uncle Famous Prill
- Alan Hale, Sr. as Jed Isbell
- Lewis Stone as Dr. Daniel Kalbert Harris, Sr.
- James Mitchell as Dr. Daniel Kalbert Harris, Jr.
- Amanda Blake as Faith Radmore Samuels. (Blake and James Arness were reunited five years later as the stars of the long-running television western Gunsmoke.)
- Charles Kemper as Professor Sam Houston Jones, a good-natured medicine show huckster
- Connie Gilchrist as Sarah Isbell
- Ed Begley as Lon Backett
- Jack Lambert as Perry Lokey
- Arthur Hunnicutt as Chloroform Wiggins
- Philo McCullough as Townsman (uncredited)

== Reception ==
=== Critical response ===
According to MGM records, the film earned $1,962,000 in the US and Canada and $184,000 overseas, resulting in a profit of $225,000.

In 1998, Jonathan Rosenbaum of the Chicago Reader included the film in his unranked list of the best American films not included on the AFI Top 100.

The New York Times in its review wrote: "Mr. McCrea gives the picture an impeccable performance whether praying at the bedside of a dying person or brandishing his two guns in a saloon to command attention while he reads from the Bible. Ellen Drew is fine as his wife; Juano Hernandez is excellent as the aged Negro, and Dean Stockwell, the late Alan Hale, James Mitchell and Amanda Blake head a supporting cast that is uniformly very good. With the help of a screenplay by Margaret Fitts and the direction of Jacques Tourneur Stars In My Crown has become a real cinematic treasure."

== Release ==
=== Home media ===
Stars In My Crown was released on VHS on April 25, 1994, by Warner Bros. Home Entertainment for MGM under their contract agreement. The film was released on DVD on April 18, 2011, by MGM Home Entertainment. Stars In My Crown was remastered on DVD on September 18, 2018, by Entertainment Studios Motion Pictures.
