= Harold Norton =

- Born: August 12, 1912; New York City, USA
- Died: July 1985 (aged 72–73); Islip, New York
- Occupations: Dancer, actor
- Spouses: Zenobia "Toby" Lennon (m. November 1948-July 1985; his death); Thelma Norton (m. October 1939; divorced); Evelyn Rebecca Upshur (m. July 1929; divorced)

Harold Norton (August 12, 1912 – July 1985) was an American dancer and actor who, with his dance partner Margot Webb, performed as Norton and Margot. The duo was known as one of just a handful of African American adagio teams in dance history, and were active during the swing era during the 1930s and 1940s. Norton also specialized in sophisticated European ballroom styles including the waltz, tango, and bolero, distinguishing the duo from other dance forms often expected of black performers at the time.

== Early life ==
Harold Norton was born on August 25, 1912, in New York City, New York, USA, although he told his dance partner Margot Webb that he was born in New Mexico.

== Dance career ==
In 1933, Norton met Margot Webb (nee Marjorie Smith) and the two became known as the ballroom dancing duo "Norton and Margot". The duo performed together from December 1933 to 1938, and then intermittently from 1941 to 1947. As one of the first African American ballroom dance teams in history, Norton and Margot pioneered in a genre rarely open to Black performers during the swing era, confronting significant racial barriers (long before the Civil Rights' Movement of the 1960s) while bringing polished, European-influenced technique to Afro-American vaudeville circuits. They were trained ballet dancers, but were not able to perform in ballet due to racial discrimination., so they settled for the vaudeville scene.

In 1936, they founded a dance school in central Harlem, teaching classes for children and adults while choreographing routines, often for white nightclub performers. The school closed in 1938 due to the demands of their touring schedule and financial challenges. A major venue for the duo was the Cotton Club, where Margot Webb became well known as a regular performer from 1933 to 1939. The duo performed as headline dancers from 1933 to 1939. Their engagements extended to other Black vaudeville circuits in cities such as New York, Philadelphia, Baltimore, Washington, D.C., and Chicago, as well as various Midwest nightclubs. Racial discrimination significantly constrained their opportunities, limiting access to white-owned venues and relegating them to less prominent bookings within Black circuits, where they were often treated more as spectacle rather than serious artists and faced unequal pay. In response to these barriers, the duo were only allowed to perform if they passed as a race other than their own (most often Hispanic) to secure engagements that would otherwise have been denied to Black performers. This strategy reflected the broader paradoxes and frustrations Afro-American artists encountered in the swing-era entertainment world, positioned between the declining vaudeville traditions of the 1920s and emerging opportunities of later decades.

International performances

The duo performed internationally, primarily in Europe during the 1930s before the outbreak of World War II. They toured locations including London, Paris, and Germany as part of their ballroom dance act. In 1937, the duo joined the Cotton Club Revue for part of their European engagements, appearing at venues such as the London Palladium and the Moulin Rouge in Paris, before continuing as an independent act on continental variety shows. During this period, they also performed in Germany until December 1937, when they were expelled under Nazi policies which banned non-Aryans from public performances. This incident was noted in the African American press as breaking the "Jim-Crow barrier of Hitler." They received a notice from officials in Hamburg, allowing them to return home to the United States. These international appearances marked a significant extension of their career beyond the United States, showcasing African American ballroom dance on European stages in the pre-war era.

== Film career ==
In addition to his dance career with Margot Webb, Norton portrayed a few roles in motion pictures. His foray into film acting was limited, with credits in only two feature films, both independent all-Black cast productions known as race films.

Filmography

- Old Ironsides (1926) - Sailor (uncredited)
- Sunday Sinners (1940) - Earl Williams
- Sepia Cinderella (1947) - Nightclub Master of Ceremonies
