= Juano Hernandez =

Puerto Rican actor (1896–1970)

Juano Hernández
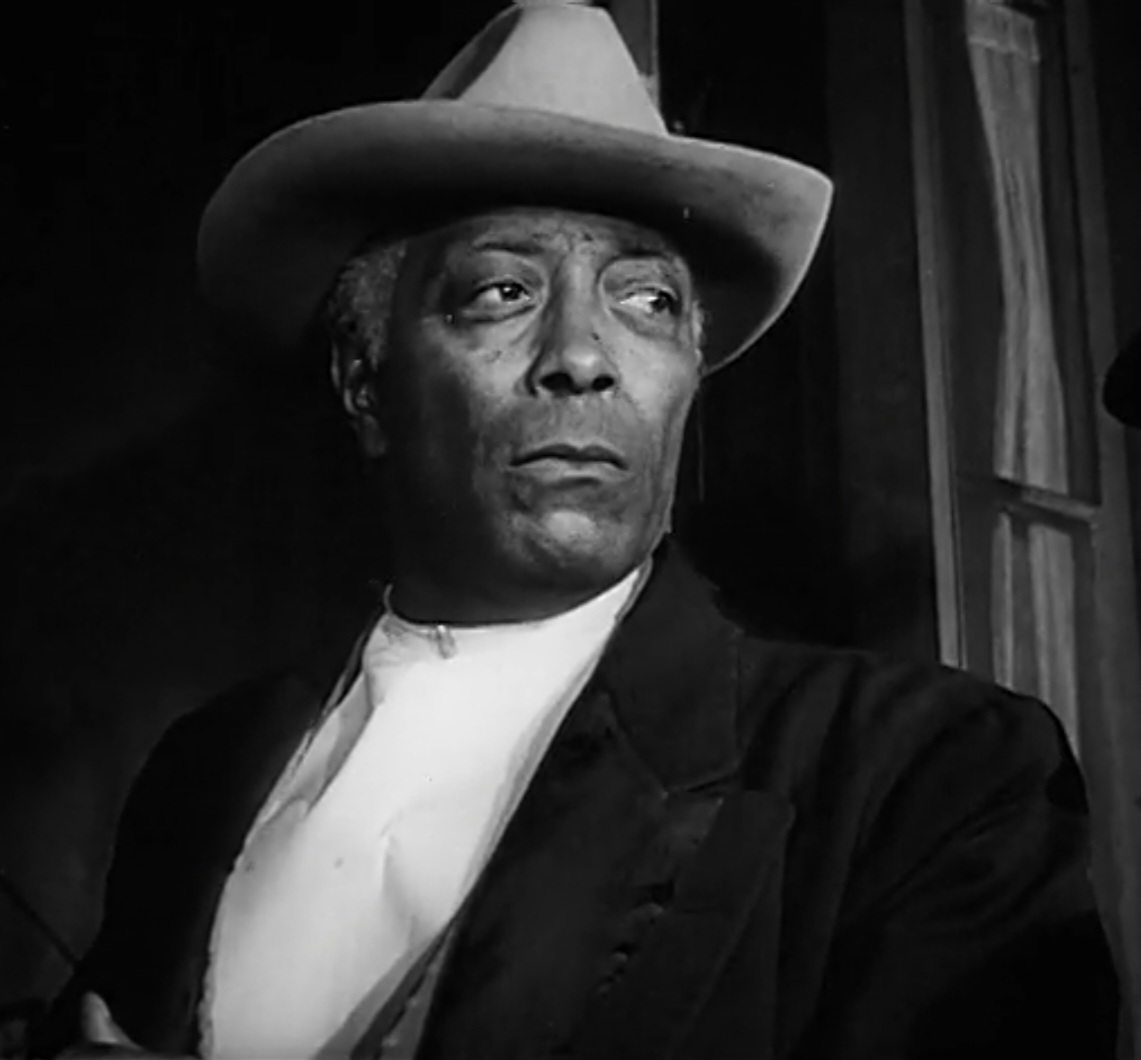
- Hernández in Intruder in the Dust (1949)
- Born: Juano G. Hernández; July 19, 1896; San Juan, Puerto Rico
- Died: July 17, 1970 (aged 73); San Juan, Puerto Rico
- Resting place: Buxeda Memorial Park, in Río Piedras, Puerto Rico
- Occupation: Actor
- Years active: 1927–1970
- Spouse(s): Haydee Bello Paoli (m. Oct 29, 1928; died 1956) Carlota Heroina Mera (m. 1961)
- Children: 2

Juano G. Hernández (July 19, 1896 – July 17, 1970) was a Puerto Rican stage and film actor who was a pioneer in the African American film industry. He made his silent picture debut in The Life of General Villa, and talking picture debut in an Oscar Micheaux film, The Girl from Chicago, which was directed at black audiences. Hernández also performed in a series of dramatic roles in mainstream Hollywood movies. His participation in the film Intruder in the Dust (1949) earned him a Golden Globe Award nomination for "New Star of the Year." Later in life he returned to Puerto Rico, where he intended to make a film based on the life of Sixto Escobar.

== Early years ==
Hernández was born in San Juan, Puerto Rico to Puerto Rican parents, Jose Guillermo and Clara de Ponce. After his mother died, he was taken by his father (a merchant sailor) to Brazil, here he was to be raised by an aunt. Hernández would acquire the nickname "Huano" during this time. The subsequent death of his father left him without any economic income. With no formal education, he worked as a sailor and settled in Rio de Janeiro. He was hired by a circus run by Arab street performers and became an entertainer, making his first appearance as an acrobat in Rio de Janeiro in 1922. Hernández would perform both in that city and at São Paulo.

After becoming a teenager, Hernández joined Traveling circuses that made their way throughout the Americas, eventually arriving at New Orleans. There, Hernández gained an affinity for educating himself in several fields and began mail-in English classes and worked on his fiction writing. He later lived in the Caribbean and made his living as a professional boxer, fighting under the ringname "Kid Curley" and gathering a record of 3-7-1 (2 KOs) as a featherweight. Hernández had four children, three of them with his first wife Haydee Bello Paoli.

== Vaudeville and the stage ==
In New York City, he worked in vaudeville and minstrel shows, sang in a church choir and was a radio script writer. During his spare time he perfected his diction by studying Shakespeare, thus enabling himself to work in radio. He co-starred in radio's first all-black soap opera We Love and Learn. He also participated in the following radio shows: Mandrake the Magician (opposite Raymond Edward Johnson and Jessica Tandy), The Shadow, Tennessee Jed, and Against the Storm. He became a household name after his participation in The Cavalcade of America, a series which promoted American history and inventiveness. Hernández also performed in dance numbers, despite lacking formal training. In 1922 he appeared in Blackbirds with the Providence Town Players. He appeared in the Broadway shows Brown Sugar (1937), Strange Fruit, Black Souls, and Set My People Free. His Broadway debut was in the chorus of the 1927 musical production Show Boat. Hernández appeared in a total of eight plays during this time, including Fast and Furious (1931). While acting in Set My People Free, Hernández was first noticed by an MGM scout. Hernández toured the American West performing Vaudeville, then in radio after returning to New York. For CBS, he appeared in John Henry: Black River Giant (1933), which was followed by The Story of Ruby Valentine (1942).

== Film career ==
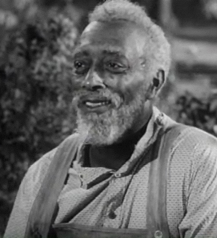
Juano Hernández as Uncle Famous Prill in Stars in My Crown (1950)

Hernández appeared in 26 films throughout his career. He portrayed a revolutionary soldier in the silent film The Life of General Villa, and his first "talkie" films were small roles in films produced by Oscar Micheaux, who made race films for black audiences. His talking film debut was Micheaux's independent filmThe Girl from Chicago (1932), in which he was cast as a Cuban racketeer. He also has a speaking part, although uncredited, as a police officer in the 1932 crime drama and musical Harlem Is Heaven, which stars Bill "Bojangles" Robinson. This was followed by Lying Lips (1939) and The Notorious Elinor Lee (1940).

In 1949, he acted in his first mainstream film, based on William Faulkner's novel, Intruder in the Dust, in which he played the role of Lucas Beauchamp, a poor Mississippi farmer unjustly accused of the murder of a white man. The film earned him a Golden Globe nomination for "New Star of the Year". The film was listed as one of the ten best of the year by the New York Times. Faulkner said of the film: "I'm not much of a moviegoer, but I did see that one. I thought it was a fine job. That Juano Hernández is a fine actor--and man, too." The racially mixed cast was rare for the time and during the filming at Oxford, Mississippi, he had to deal with segregation during the filming process.

In the 1950 western Stars In My Crown, directed by Jacques Tourneur, starring Joel McCrea, Hernández plays a freed slave who refuses to sell his land and faces an angry lynch mob. His role in this movie made him a target of the Ku Klux Klan. He is also memorable in Young Man With a Horn as Art Hazzard, a jazz trumpet player who mentors fellow musician Kirk Douglas.

He was singled out for praise for his performance in the 1950 film The Breaking Point with John Garfield. The New York Times called his performance "quietly magnificent."

He also received favorable notices for his performances in Trial (1955), about a politically charged court case, in which he played the judge, and Sidney Lumet's The Pawnbroker (1965). During this time he was reported to be the "best paid colored actor in Hollywood". Hernández continued active with Something of Value (1957), Machete (1958), St. Louis Blues (1958), Sergeant Rutledge, The Pawnbroker (1964) and Reivers (1969).

More than 50 years after its initial release, in 2001, film historian Donald Bogle wrote that Intruder in the Dust broke new ground in the cinematic portrayal of blacks, and Hernández's "performance and extraordinary presence still rank above that of almost any other black actor to appear in an American movie."

== Television appearances ==
Over the years, Hernández made guest appearances on a dozen U.S. network television programs, appearing three times in 1960 and 1961 on the ABC series, Adventures in Paradise, starring Gardner McKay. In 1959, he starred in the Alfred Hitchcock Presents production of the Ambrose Bierce short story An Occurrence at Owl Creek Bridge. Hernández also appeared in The Dispossessed (1961), a CBS television film.

Other television shows in which Hernandez appeared were Naked City, The Defenders, The Dick Powell Show and Studio One.

== Later years ==
In 1955, Hernández decided to open a drama school at Hollywood, which he had to close after the promised support did not materialize. Despite this, he trained the likes of Sammy Davis Jr., Rock Hudson and Sidney Poitier. He was also recruited by the University of Puerto Rico (UPR) to serve as a drama and English teacher. There he taught to, among others, actor Henry Darrow. The institution also awarded him an honoris causa degree for his career.

Hernández returned to Puerto Rico late in his life, working as a drama instructor, theatre and radio producer. He bought terrains at Trujillo Alto, which were intended to be developed into Cinema studios also housed a small amusement park. Together with Julio Torregrosa he wrote a script for a movie about the life of Puerto Rico's first boxing champion, Sixto Escobar. After Steve McQueen died he was unable to get funding in Puerto Rico and therefore he translated the script into English. He sent it to several companies in Hollywood and had it almost sold at the time of his death. In the last two years of his life he appeared in three films, The Extraordinary Seaman (1969) with David Niven, The Reivers (1969) with Steve McQueen, and They Call Me Mister Tibbs! (1970) with Sidney Poitier.

== Death ==
Hernández died in San Juan on July 17, 1970, of a cerebral hemorrhage suffered while his wife Carlota was away 2 days before his 74th birthday, and was interred at Cementerio Buxeda Memorial Park, Río Piedras, Puerto Rico. This was an era marked with racial clashes and his burial was attended by about 60 individuals. By the turn of the century, his grave had been abandoned. It was coincidentally found by a politician and later, a revival of his work was pursued by artist Orvil Miller.

== Legacy ==
Hernández is considered a pioneer of black cinema and Donald Bogle credited him with paving the way for figures like Sidney Poitier.

== Filmography ==
- The Life of General Villa (1914) ... Revolutionary Soldier (uncredited)
- The Girl from Chicago (1932) .... Gomez
- Harlem Is Heaven (1932) .... Cop (uncredited)
- Lying Lips (1939) .... Reverend Bryson
- The Notorious Elinor Lee (1940) ... John Arthur
- Intruder in the Dust (1949) .... Lucas Beauchamp
- Young Man with a Horn (1950) .... Art Hazzard
- Stars in My Crown (1950) .... Uncle Famous Prill
- The Breaking Point (1950) .... Wesley Park
- Kiss Me Deadly (1955) .... Eddie Yeager
- Trial (1955) .... Judge Theodore Motley
- Ransom! (1956) .... Jesse Chapman aka Uncle Jesse
- Something of Value (1957) .... Njogu, Oath Giver
- The Mark of the Hawk (1958) .... Amugu
- St. Louis Blues (1958) .... Reverend Charles Handy
- Machete (1958) .... Bernardo
- Alfred Hitchcock Presents (1959) (Season 5 Episode 13: "An Occurrence at Owl Creek Bridge") .... Josh
- Sergeant Rutledge (1960) .... Sergeant Matthew Luke Skidmore
- The Sins of Rachel Cade (1961) .... Kalanumu
- Two Loves (1961) .... Chief Rauhuia
- Westinghouse Presents: The Dispossessed (1961) (TV) .... Standing Bear
- Hemingway's Adventures of a Young Man (1962) .... Bugs
- The Pawnbroker (1964) .... Mr. Smith
- The Extraordinary Seaman (1969) .... Ali Shar
- The Reivers (1969) .... Uncle Possum
- They Call Me Mister Tibbs! (1970) .... Mealie Williamson (final film role)

== See also ==
- List of Puerto Ricans
- African immigration to Puerto Rico
- List of Puerto Ricans of African descent
