= Hubert Julian =

American aviator

Hubert Fauntleroy Julian
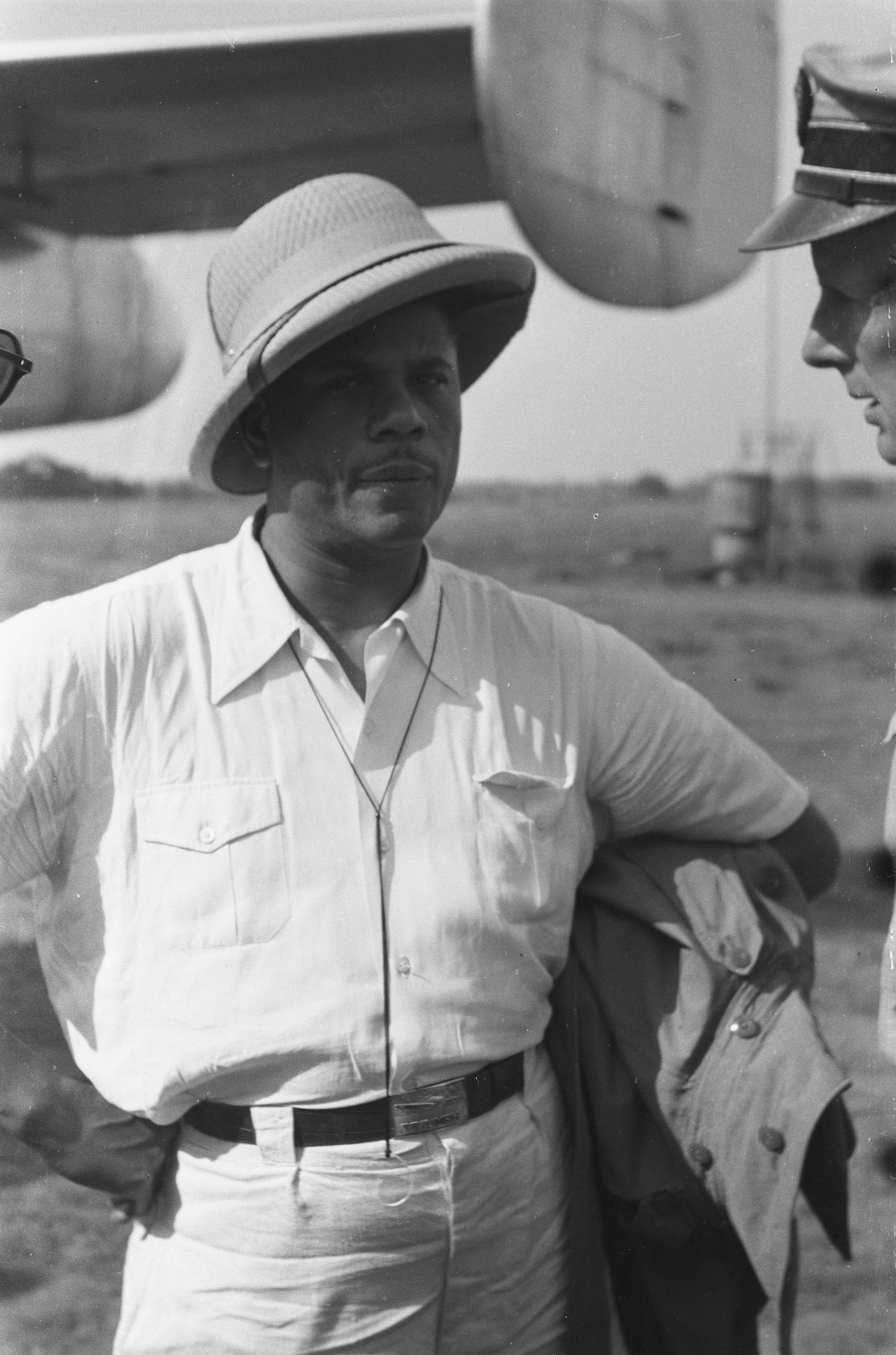

Personal details
- Born: 20 September 1897 Port of Spain, Trinidad
- Died: 19 February 1983 (aged 85) New York City, New York, U.S.

Military service
- Allegiance: Ethiopian Empire; United States
- Years of service: 1935; 1941–1942
- Battles/wars: World War II

Hubert Fauntleroy Julian (21 September 1897 – 19 February 1983) was a Trinidad-born American aviation pioneer. He was nicknamed "the Black Eagle".

== Early years ==
Hubert Fauntleroy Julian was born in Port of Spain, Trinidad, in 1897. His father, Henry, was a cocoa plantation manager in Toco. Julian caught his first glimpse of an airplane on 3 January 1913, when Frank Boland performed an exhibition flight, ultimately crashing and dying. The shock of the crash stayed with Julian who, after World War I, left his island home for Canada. There, in November 1920, he flew for the first time during a joyride with Canadian flying ace Billy Bishop. Shortly after this he designed and patented what was labeled an "Aeroplane Safety Appliance."

== 1920s ==
In 1921, Julian left Montreal for good and moved to Harlem. Once there he came under the influence of the charismatic Marcus Garvey and joined the Universal Negro Improvement Association. This new "Garveyvite" soon adopted a new persona, rechristening himself "Lieutenant Hubert Julian" of the Royal Canadian Air Force. Julian had a tailor fashion for him a fake military uniform in order to push his new narrative. On 3 September 1922, Julian performed his first parachute jump at Curtiss Field on Long Island; the event was headlined with a flight by Bessie Coleman. Julian would make one more jump that year before teaming up with aviator Clarence Chamberlin who, in addition to teaching his new business partner how to truly handle an airplane, flew him up above Harlem where the Trinidadian parachuted several times, the most famous moment coming when he wore a crimson jumpsuit while playing "Runnin' Wild" on a saxophone. This would be the stunt which caused H. Allen Smith to dub Julian "the Black Eagle of Harlem". Julian also parachuted over Harlem while playing a gold-plated saxophone in October 1923.

In 1924, Julian, along with Chamberlin, began toying with the idea of performing a transatlantic flight, with stops in Florida, the West Indies, Central America, Brazil, and Saint Paul's Rock (in the mid-Atlantic), from New York City to Liberia. An old seaplane was purchased and refitted for the proposed flight; Julian dubbed it the Ethiopia. On 4 July, with a crowd of thousands gathered at the banks of the Harlem River to witness his takeoff, Julian boarded his plane, after having UNIA members help raise some last-minute funds to pay off his investors, and soared into the sky. A few minutes would pass before Julian realized that one of his plane's pontoons had filled up with water, throwing the aircraft's weight off balance. Unable to regain control, Julian crashed into Flushing Bay.

Julian would try twice more to pilot a transatlantic flight before the 1920s came to end. The first of these two attempts ended when his plane's wings were vandalized by unknown assailants while they were being stored in Happyland Park. The second, and final, attempt saw New York State Senator A. Spencer Feld take the helm of the endeavor, but after Amelia Earhart crossed the Atlantic Ocean, Julian felt dismayed at the prospect of performing something that had now been done by more than a handful of others and canceled the project.

== 1930s ==
During the first half of the 1930s, Julian made three trips to the Ethiopian Empire. It was during his second visit when he crashed Haile Selassie's favorite plane, causing the emperor to ask Julian to leave his kingdom. But the Black Eagle would return on the eve of the Second Italo-Ethiopian War, gaining a military commission to help defend the African kingdom. It was during this third trip when he would come to blows with John C. Robinson, the Brown Condor of Chicago, over jabs in the press which Julian attributed to Robinson. On 8 August 1935, Julian assaulted Robinson at the Hotel de France in Addis Ababa. After the incident he was ordered by the Emperor to leave the country.

In December 1937, Julian in the position of equerry to Princess Almeria Ali of Egypt was left in charge of escorting the body of the princess' father Prince Hadji Ali of Egypt, who died November 5, from Paris to Johns Hopkins University in Baltimore for scientific study. Julian was entrusted with administering the prince's $800,000 estate as well as returning the body to Egypt for interment in the family mausoleum. The prince, a vaudeville artist, was rumored to have a double stomach capable of allowing him to drink gasoline and water, bifurcated to each stomach. He would then squirt out the gasoline to ignite it followed by the water to extinguish the flames. The Amsterdam News claimed this venture by Julian was a fake, but later recanted with an apology.

As a result of abdicating his British citizenship to accept Ethiopian citizenship and failing to apply for a re-entry permit to the U.S., in 1938, he experienced passport challenges that delayed his re-entry, subsequently compromising a $200,000 business deal potentially connected to a proposed non-stop flight from New York to Karachi, India.

Julian spent his time stateside traveling with William Powell's Five Blackbirds, an all black flying troupe who performed in the Midwest and California as well as performing piloting services for paying customers like Father Divine. December 1939, Julian attempted to settle a lawsuit between Father Divine and one of his fallen Angels, Mrs. Verinda Brown. New York Supreme Court Justice Benedict E. Dineen and both parties eventually agreed to the $12,000 in warehouse receipts for whiskey presented by Julian with the intention of covering Divine's $6500 to $17,000 in claims. Julian purported to own more than $800,000 worth of 25-year old whiskey. Upwards of twenty-five defrauded Angels came forward as a result insisting on being repaid, forcing Julian to quickly withdraw his offer on the grounds of fairness to all and an inability to pay them all. He also embarked on a short-lived career as a film producer with the director Oscar Micheaux, helping to fund the distribution for two of Micheaux's films: Lying Lips and The Notorious Eleanor Lee.

== 1940s ==
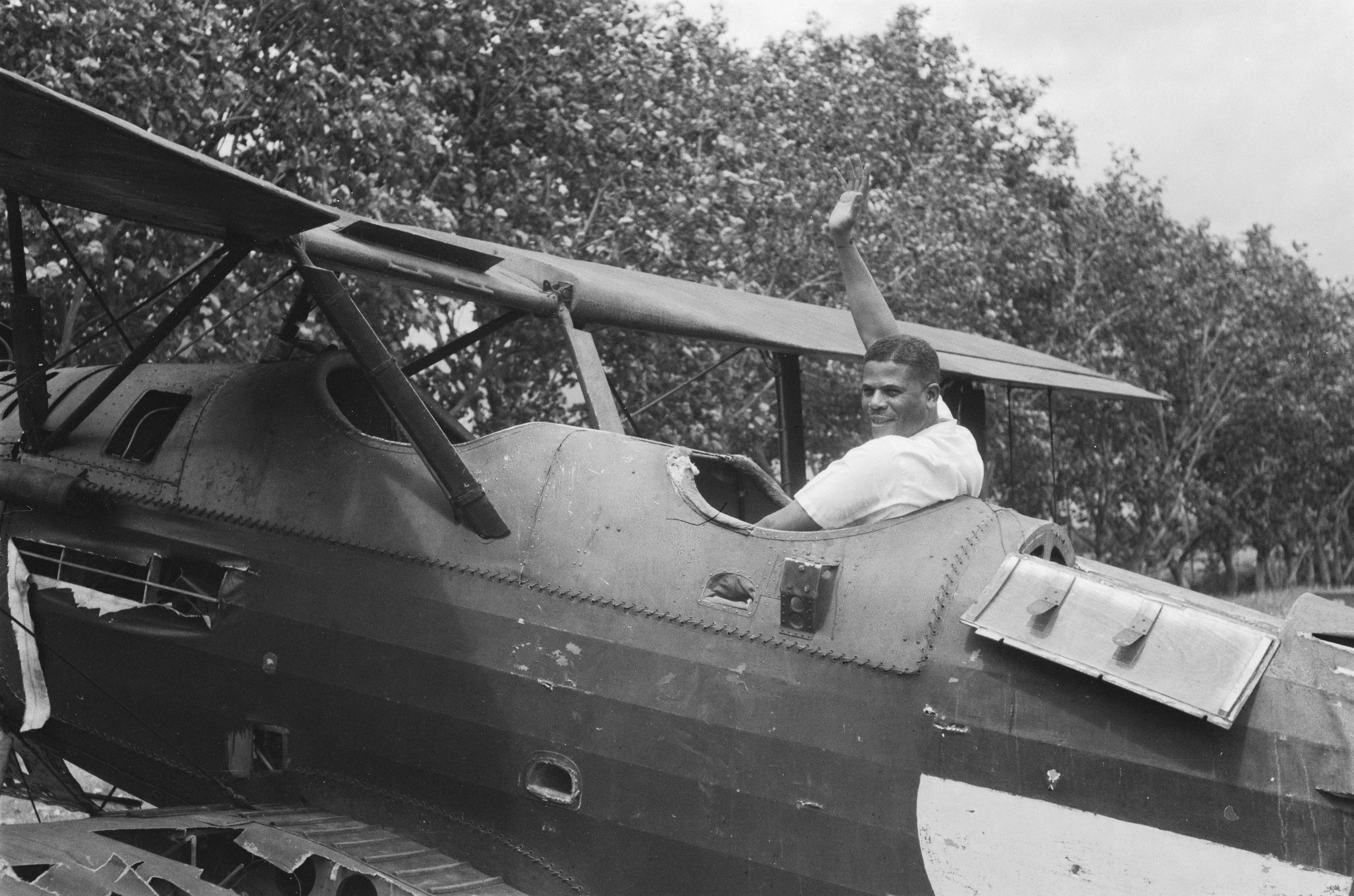
Julian in Yogyakarta, Indonesia (1949)

During the Winter War between Finland and the Soviet Union, Julian, along with many other American volunteers, left for Finland in order to help provide assistance. He was there for several months without seeing action, before departing back for the United States.

When Julian learned, from Giuseppe Bellanca, what Adolf Hitler and Hermann Göring had been saying about peoples of color, the Black Eagle issued a challenge to the latter, offering the Nazi leader the chance to duel him in an aerial battle above the English Channel. Göring never gave an official response to the challenge, but Julian gained widespread praise for his bold verbal attacks.

Once the attack on Pearl Harbor thrust the United States into World War II, Julian, now in his 40s, enlisted into the military. He would serve less than a year, becoming an American citizen in the process, and earning an honorable discharge with the final rank of private first class.

== 1950s and 1960s ==
After the end of World War II Julian become a licensed arms dealer. His first contract was with the Arbenz government of Guatemala. He defied the FBI when, after being asked to cease his dealings, Julian continued selling. His second contract was with the Batista government of Cuba as it tried, and ultimately failed, to combat Fidel Castro's revolutionaries. His third, and final, contract was with Moise Tshombe, leader of Katanga during the Congo Secession Crisis of the early 1960s. Julian was detained by United Nations forces for questioning and was in the end jailed for four months before being released. He retired upon his return to the United States.

== Later years and death ==
Julian spent his retirement meeting the likes of Muhammad Ali and appearing on The Merv Griffin Show and The Tonight Show. He died in 1983 and was buried at Calverton National Cemetery in Suffolk County, New York.

== Personal life ==
Hubert Julian was married three times. His first marriage, which lasted only a few years, was to Edna Powell. His second marriage, his longest, was to Essie Gittens, whom he had known while growing up in Trinidad. They raised a young orphaned cousin of Essie's, a girl named Olga, as their own. His third marriage, after Essie died, was to a woman named Doreen, who gave birth to Julian's only biological child, Mark Anthony Bernard Julian, in July 1971.

== In popular culture ==
- The Black Eagle of Harlem is a documentary by independent filmmaker Billy Tooma. It covers Julian's life from his birth in Trinidad to his adventures in Harlem, Ethiopia, and everywhere between. It saw its world premiere on 24 June 2017, at the Aviation Hall of Fame & Museum of New Jersey.
- Julian is the central character of Chasing the Black Eagle, an historical novel by Canadian author Bruce Geddes, published by Dundurn Press in 2023.
