= Flying Pat =

1920 film

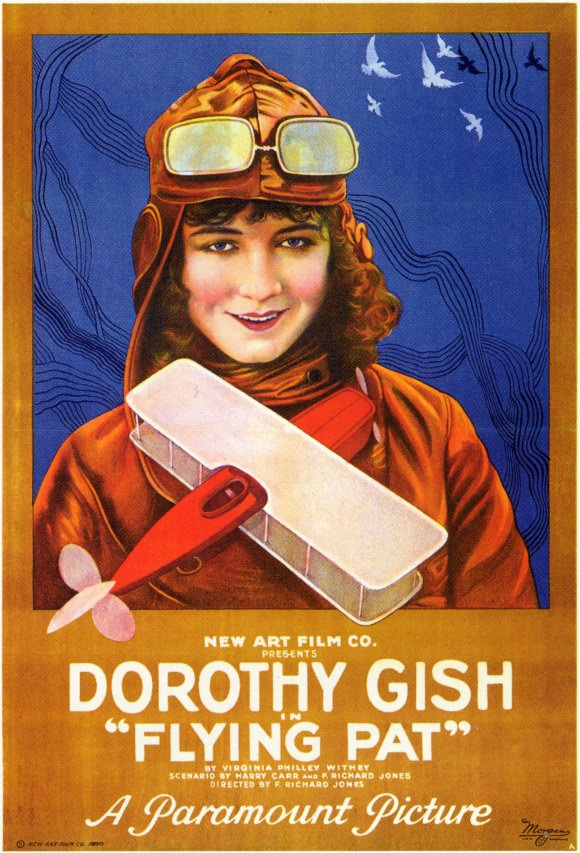
- Film Poster
- Directed by: F. Richard Jones
- Written by: Virginia Philley Withey (story); Harry Carr (scenario); F. Richard Jones
- Starring: Dorothy Gish; James Rennie
- Cinematography: Fred Chaston
- Production company: New Art Film Co.
- Distributed by: Paramount Pictures
- Release date: November 11, 1920
- Running time: 50 minutes; 5 reels
- Country: United States
- Language: Silent (English intertitles)

Flying Pat is a 1920 American silent comedy film starring Dorothy Gish and her then husband James Rennie that was directed by F. Richard Jones. It was produced by Famous Players–Lasky and distributed by Paramount Pictures.

The film is preserved in the Cinémathèque française.

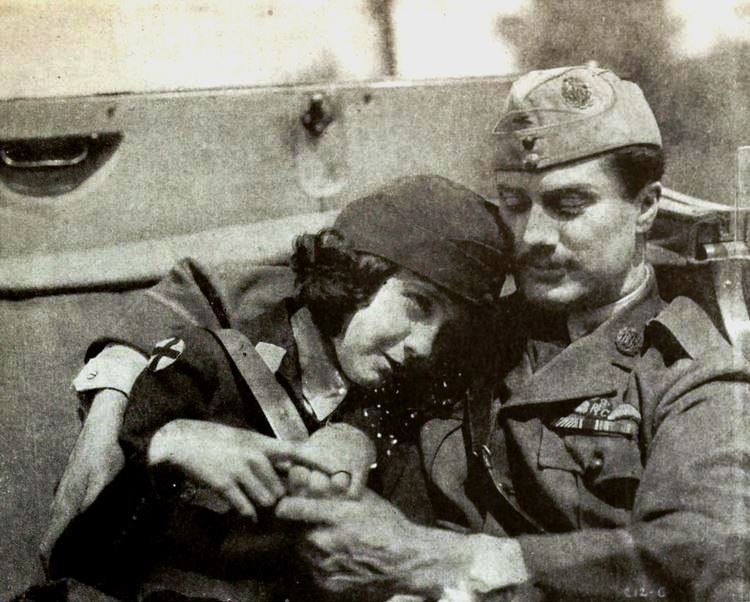
Still with Dorothy Gish and James Rennie.

== Plot ==
As described in a film magazine, young bride Patricia Van Nuys, whose husband Robert desires that she carve out a career rather than bother her pretty head about domestic chores, is given lessons in flying by William Endicott. Her experiences as a pupil land them both on the ground in a nose dive wreck from which they miraculously emerge and seek refreshment in a nearby roadhouse. Her husband arrives on the scene just as her instructor is proving to be an affectionate and entertaining companion. His ire drives her out of the home and on the night train to Albany. Rid of her money in a poker game, she returns and meets an emergency by posing as a cook in her own home. One complication leads to another until they terminate in the reconciliation of the couple.

== Cast ==
- Dorothy Gish as Patricia Van Nuys
- James Rennie as Robert Van Nuys
- Morgan Wallace as William Endicott
- Harold Vizard as Butler
- Porter Strong as Reporter
- Tom Blake as Policeman
- Kate Bruce as Old Lady
- Dorothy Walters as Cook
- Miss Waters as Housemaid

== Release ==
Flying Pat was released in the United States on November 11, 1920. It was still circulating in 1922, screening at the Empress Theatre in Mangum, Oklahoma, on February 24 and 25, and at the Royal Theatre in Guymon on Saturday, March 4. A week after that, it played Tulsa.

The film first screened in New Zealand at the Paramount and Artcraft Theatres on June 3, 1921, on a double bill with the dramatic feature The Inside of the Cup. The film played at those theaters through at least June 8. It was second feature to Cecil B. deMille's Something to Think About when it screened at Wellington's Princess Theatre on December 9 of that year. It premiered in Whangārei the following month.

== Note ==
In her 1969 autobiography, The Movies Mr. Griffith and Me, Lillian Gish includes a still from this movie identifying James Rennie, Dorothy Gish, and an unknown player. The unknown player is actor Morgan Wallace.
