= Two Daughters of Eve =

1912 film

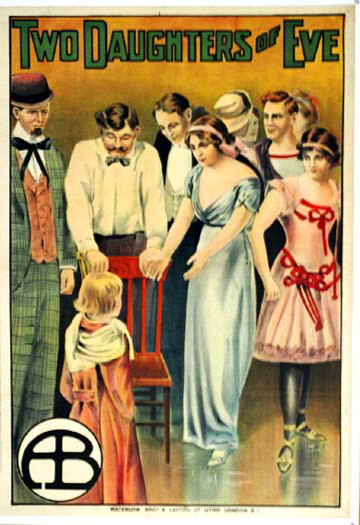
- Theatrical poster to Two Daughters of Eve
- Directed by: D. W. Griffith
- Written by: George Hennessy
- Starring: Claire McDowell
- Cinematography: G. W. Bitzer
- Release date: September 19, 1912
- Running time: 18 minutes (16 frame/s)
- Country: United States
- Language: Silent (English intertitles)

Two Daughters of Eve is a 1912 American silent drama film directed by D. W. Griffith. A print exits in a private film collection.

== Cast ==
- Claire McDowell as The Mother
- Henry B. Walthall as The Father
- Florence Geneva as The Actress
- Gertrude Bambrick as Backstage
- Elmer Booth as Backstage
- Kathleen Butler as Backstage
- W. Christy Cabanne as The Driver
- Harry Carey as In Audience
- Dorothy Gish as Theater Crowd Extra
- Lillian Gish as Theater Crowd Extra
- Mary Gish as Theater Crowd Extra
- D. W. Griffith as At Stage Door
- Robert Harron as At Stage Door
- Harry Hyde as In Audience
- Marion Kerby
- Mae Marsh
- Walter Miller as Backstage
- W. Chrystie Miller
- Antonio Moreno as An Actor/At Stage Door
- George Nichols
- Alfred Paget as In Audience
- W. C. Robinson as Backstage

== See also ==
- Harry Carey filmography
- D. W. Griffith filmography
- Lillian Gish filmography
