= Judith of Bethulia =

1914 film directed by D. W. Griffith

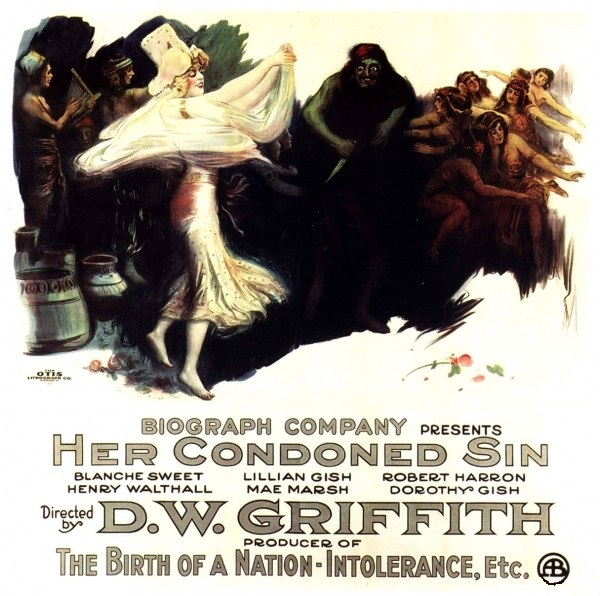
- Directed by: D. W. Griffith
- Written by: Thomas Bailey Aldrich; D. W. Griffith; Frank E. Woods
- Starring: Blanche Sweet; Henry B. Walthall
- Cinematography: G. W. Bitzer
- Edited by: James Smith
- Production company: Biograph Company
- Distributed by: General Film Company
- Release date: March 8, 1914 (U.S.)
- Running time: 61 minutes
- Country: United States
- Language: Silent (English intertitles)

Judith of Bethulia is a 1914 American silent epic film starring Blanche Sweet and Henry B. Walthall, and produced and directed by D. W. Griffith, based on the play "Judith and the Holofernes" (1896) by Thomas Bailey Aldrich, which itself was a script adaptation written by Grace Adele Pierce (1858-1923) of the Book of Judith. The film was the first feature-length film made by pioneering film company Biograph, although the second that Biograph released. It is considered the earliest American made epic film.

Shortly after its completion and a disagreement Griffith had with Biograph executives on making more future feature-length films, Griffith left Biograph, and took the entire stock company with him. Biograph delayed the picture's release until 1914, after Griffith's departure, so that it would not have to pay him in a profit-sharing agreement they had.

== Plot ==
Judith of Bethulia

The film is based on the deuterocanonical Book of Judith. During the siege of the Jewish city of Bethulia by the Assyrians, a widow named Judith has a plan to stop the war as her people suffer starvation and are ready to surrender.

The widow disguises herself as a harem girl and goes to the enemy camp, where she beguiles a general of King Nebuchadnezzar, whose army is besieging the city. Judith seduces Holofernes, then while he is drunk cuts off his head with a sabre. She returns to her city, a heroine.

== Cast ==
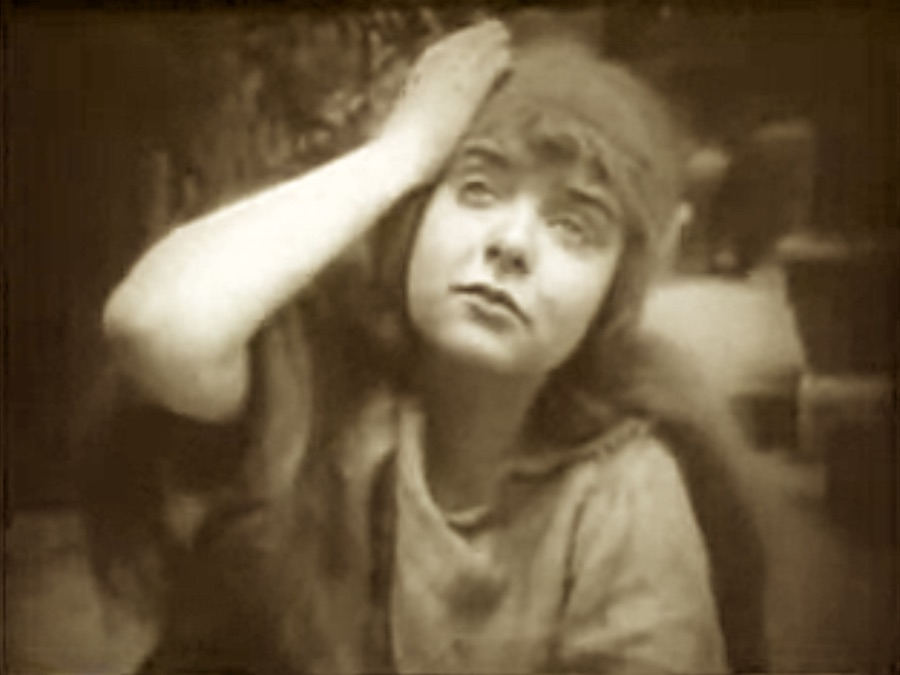
Blanche Sweet as Judith

- Blanche Sweet as Judith
- Henry B. Walthall as Holofernes
- Mae Marsh as Naomi
- Robert Harron as Nathan
- Lillian Gish as the young mother
- Dorothy Gish as the crippled beggar
- Kate Bruce as Judith's maid
- J. Jiquel Lanoe as eunuch attendant
- Harry Carey as Assyrian traitor
- W. Chrystie Miller as Bethulian
- Gertrude Robinson
- Charles Hill Mailes as Bethulian soldier
- Edward Dillon
- Gertrude Bambrick as lead Assyrian dancer
- Lionel Barrymore as extra
- Clara T. Bracy as Bethulian
- Kathleen Butler as Bethulian
- William J. Butler as Bethulian
- Christy Cabanne
- William A. Carroll as Assyrian soldier
- Frank Evans as Bethulian soldier
- Mary Gish
- Harry Hyde as Bethulian soldier / Assyrian soldier
- Thomas Jefferson (actor)
- Jennie Lee as Bethulian
- Adolph Lestina as Bethulian
- Elmo Lincoln
- Antonio Moreno as extra
- Marshall Neilan
- Frank Opperman as Bethulian
- Alfred Paget as Bethulian / Assyrian soldier
- W. C. Robinson as Bethulian soldier
- Kate Toncray as one of Judith's servants

== Reviews ==
The reviews were favorable: Variety, March 27, 1914, wrote: "It is not easy to confess one's self unequal to a given task, but to pen an adequate description of the Biograph's production of Judith of Bethulia is, to say the least, a full grown man's job."

The Moving Picture World, March 7, 1914, described it as: "A fascinating work of high artistry, Judith of Bethulia will not only rank as an achievement in this country, but will make foreign producers sit up and take notice."
