= Harry Carr =

American reporter, editor and columnist (1877–1936)

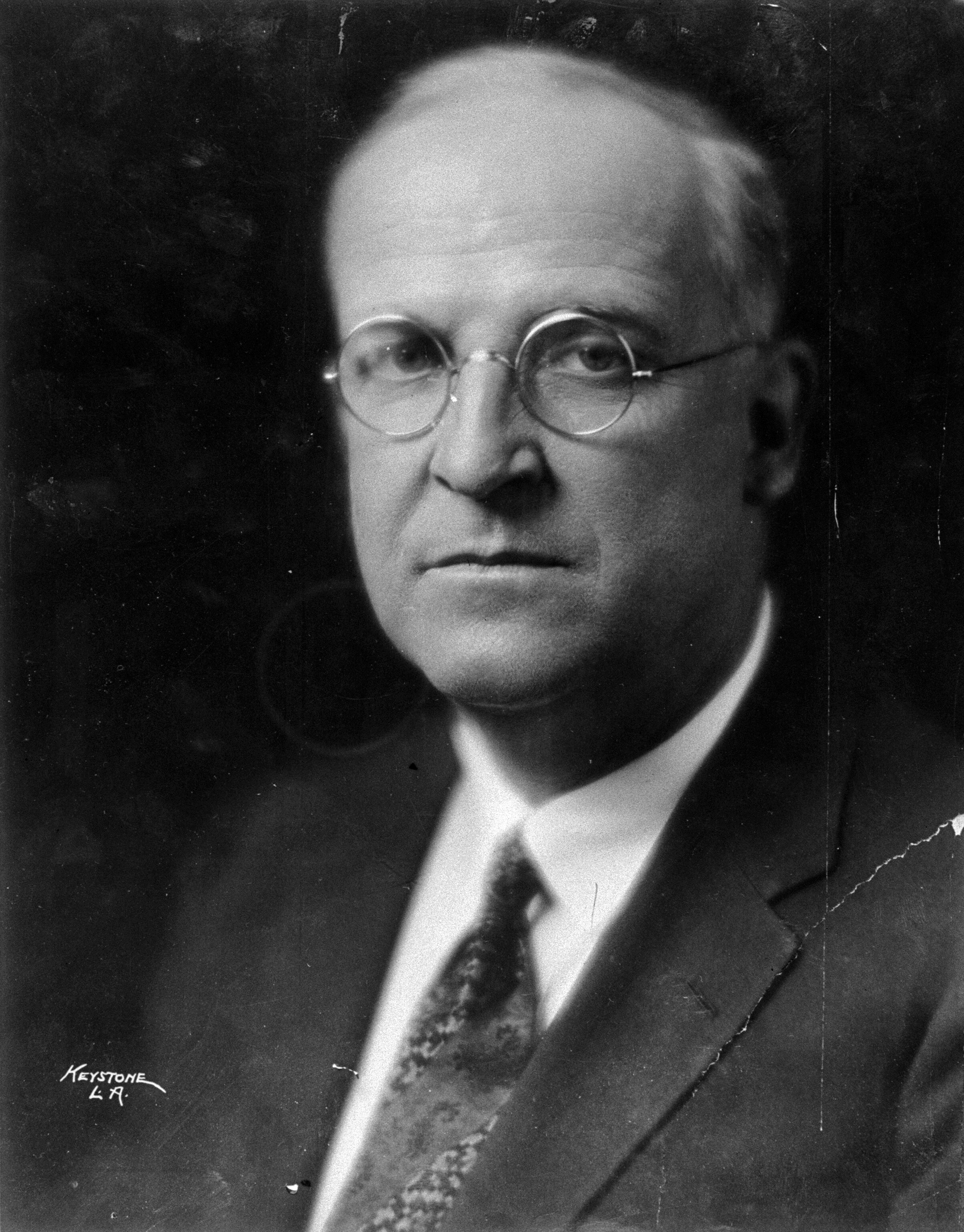
Carr in 1935

Harry C. Carr (1877–1936) was an American reporter, editor and columnist for the Los Angeles Times. In 1934 he was given an honorable mention by a Pulitzer Prize committee on awards. When he died of a heart attack aged 58, his funeral was attended by more than a thousand people.

== Professional life ==
Carr's first newspaper job was in 1897 when he was hired by the Los Angeles Herald on the recommendation of business manager Fred Alles to do "unusual little stories, funny or with heart interest.".

As a young reporter on the hunt for a story, Carr was ejected from a Los Angeles theater when, uninvited, he tried to watch the rehearsal of a play. The resourceful Carr, however, spied on the troupe through an alley window, wrote a story about it and it was printed. Subsequent stories brought Carr's talent to the attention of Harry Andrews, then managing editor of the Times, so he sent for Carr and gave him a job.

I was one of the hungry who robbed grocery stores for their food, one of the parched thousands who eagerly drank water out of the gutter leakage of the fire engines.

— Harry Carr, writing of his day in a ruined San Francisco in April 1906.

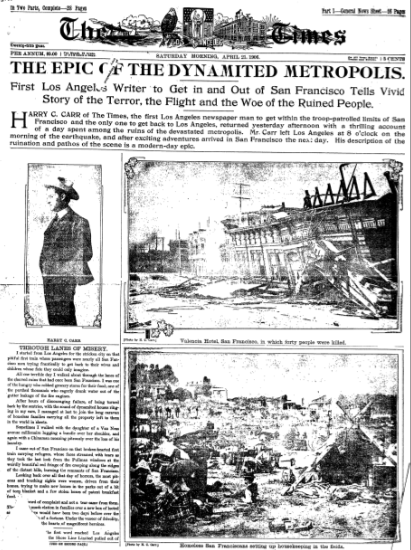
Carr's earthquake story and two of his photos took up almost the entire front page.

Carr's reputation soared with his eyewitness coverage of the San Francisco earthquake and fire of 1906. He was the first outside reporter to make his way to the shattered city and his efforts resulted in "four or five full newspaper pages of print, the longest story I ever saw in a paper," said John Von Blon, an assistant city editor at the time. "I locked Harry in a room in the morning, brought him his luncheon and dinner and kept him right at it." His coverage, reporting and writing was "one of the greatest stories of modern times, one that is still regarded by newspapermen all over the world as a model for the chronicling of some tremendous and awful event," a colleague, Julian Johnson, recalled thirty years later.

Carr was later assigned to the sports department, where he became editor around 1912 and wrote a column, "Through the Carr Window." "He was particularly interested in boxing and covered many championship fights . . . . He was one of the first writers to hail Jack Dempsey as a coming champion."

Shortly after, Carr was assigned as Times correspondent in Washington, D.C., and in 1915 he was in Europe, covering World War I from Berlin and elsewhere. In 1916 he returned briefly to Los Angeles, then headed back to Washington. Columns he filed from there were often headed "Checkerboard" or "Grouchy Remarks." He also covered the Mexican Revolution (1910–1920).

1931 heading for Carr's long-running The Lancer column

In 1920, he turned to criticism of the stage and screen. Directors like D.W. Griffith, Cecil B. DeMille, Mack Sennett, Jesse Lasky and Erich von Stroheim called on him to help humanize their films; he became a "story editor-at-large." He went to New York for a time, but "hastened back to his beloved California."

Carr was editorial page editor in 1922. His column, "The Lancer," began on November 18, 1924, and appeared almost daily thereafter.

In 1932 he was called back to the sports department to edit the special sections covering the 1932 Olympic Games in Los Angeles, and

Harry Carr was back in the sports saddle for sixteen glorious, hectic, fantastic days and nights. He was . . . an impresario sitting in the old office of The Times, amid mounds of waste paper and mountains of pictures, making drama out of barelegged boys and girls from all over the world leaping and running in the Coliseum. . . . His staff was not big enough to keep up with him. . . . He loved sports more than anything else.

Between March 1933 and January 1934, Carr made an around-the-world trip and reported on "the bloody retreat of the Chinese before the Japanese invaders" and likened Japanese-occupied Korea "to a perpetual comic opera on a blood-stained stage, with lovely little girls — and lepers — making up the cast." He told of "Hitler's psychology and dreams of conquest, . . . of the possibility of another European conflagration breaking out in Czecho-Slovakia's capital, of the gaudy but not too impressive show being presented in Italy, and of a precarious ring of steel which France maintains about Germany. . . . Carr saw ghost ships in the harbor of Manila, and wrote of them; found the women of Bali going about without shirts and had a beetle fight staged for him."

For these stories and others written on his trip, Carr was nominated for a Pulitzer Prize by James M. Cain, novelist and Burbank, California, screenwriter. Carr was given an honorable mention in 1934 by the Pulitzer committee on awards for distinguished service as a foreign or Washington correspondent.

Of the profession of journalism, Carr wrote in 1931:

Journalism isn't a business. It is a consecration. There is no money in the job but there is everything else. Of all careers I think it is the most soul-satisfying. When I come around this way in my next incarnation a thousand years from now I am not going to lose as much time as in this whirl of life. I waited until I was 19 in this life; in the next I am going to crawl out of the cradle and demand that the nurse take me to the nearest city editor.

He wrote his last column in his Tujunga home before he left for the hospital on the day he died, and it was published the next day. In it, he referred to the recent deaths of Thelma Todd, John Gilbert and "Quien Sabe?" (who knows?). "Death cuts down the famous by threes in Hollywood," he wrote.

== Personal life ==
Carr was born in Tipton, Iowa, on March 27, 1877, to Henry Clay Carr and Louise Low Carr. He was brought to Los Angeles as a boy and graduated from Los Angeles High School. During summer vacations he went back to Rhode Island "and learned all about ships."

He had two sisters, Katharine Carr and Mrs. Edmund D. Locke. He was married to Alice Eaton of Detroit, Michigan, in 1902, and they had two children, Donald Eaton Carr and Patricia Josephine (Mrs. Walter Everett Morris).

After Carr became a successful newspaperman, he and his wife maintained two homes — one at 3202 Lowry Road in Los Angeles (between Griffith Park Boulevard and Hillhurst Avenue) and an "oak-shaded picturesque ten-acre retreat" called Las Manzanitas Ranch on McGroarty Street in suburban Tujunga. It was there that Carr wrote his will "in his sharp, crisp penmanship, almost like printing," nine days before he was stricken by a heart attack and died on January 10, 1936. He left most of his estate to his wife but bequeathed Las Manzanitas to his children.

Lee Shippey, another Los Angeles Times columnist, described the 53-year-old Carr in 1930 as

a short, roundish man with short, graying hair, a round face which continually flashes smiles, but never grins, and a heart which is an everlasting spring of sentiment. He wears his sympathies on his sleeve. In all people who are simple, natural and frank he sees the good with a magnifying glass, but he is continually laughing up his sleeve at shams. . . . He is as nervous as quicksilver and as full of surprises as a jack-in-the-box. He brashes right through doors marked "Private" and somehow the "privateers" like it. . . . He is very gentle with all who are humble or modest, but scornful of both fawning and pretentiousness. It would pain [him] to crush a fly."

Carr was considered a friend of Mexico and of Mexican-Americans in Los Angeles. Upon his death from a heart attack on January 10, 1936, memorial services were held in the Mexican-themed Olvera Street, with candles lit in his memory.

Carr's funeral at Pierce Brothers Mortuary was attended by more than a thousand people who overflowed three chapels. Audio of the service was carried from the main chapel into two adjoining rooms. Father Francis J. Caffrey of Mission San Juan Bautista delivered the eulogy at the request of the family although Carr was not Catholic.

Among the notables were Admiral Joseph M. Reeves, commander-in-chief of the United States Naval Fleet, Sheriff Eugene Biscailuz, actor Harold Lloyd and director Cecil B. DeMille, but the throng also included "Main-street habitues, hard-bitten fellows from the flop-house district." Honorary pallbearers included producers Sid Grauman, Sol Lesser, Joseph Schenck, D.W. Griffith, Irvin Cobb and Mack Sennett, boxing champion Jack Dempsey, Judge Isidore B. Dockweiler, actors Ernst Lubitsch, Eric von Stroheim and Leo Carrillo, car dealer and radio station owner Earle C. Anthony and poet and writer John Steven McGroarty.

Carr was buried at Rosedale Cemetery.

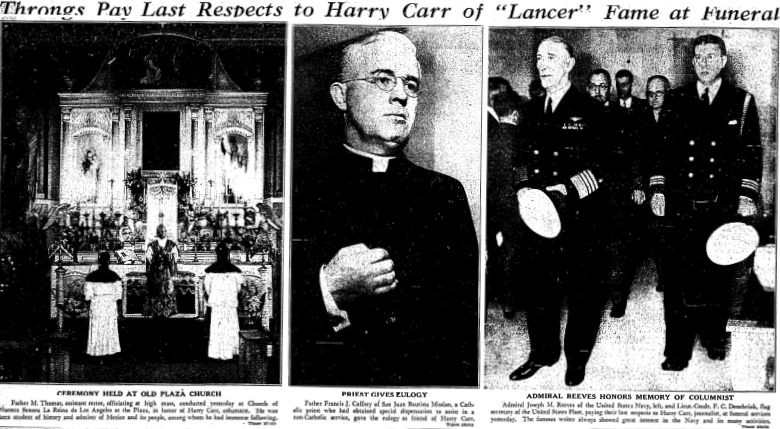
Times layout of memorials to Carr. Left, ceremony at the Plaza Church. Center, Father Francis J. Caffrey. Right, Admiral Joseph M. Reeves.

== Books written by Carr ==
- Old Mother Mexico (1931)
- The West Is Still Wild (1932)
- Riding the Tiger (1934)
- Los Angeles: City of Dreams (1935)

== Partial filmography ==
- Flying Pat (1920) (scenario)
- Old Ironsides (1926) adaptation
- Paid to Love (1927) story
- The Blue Danube (1928) writer
- The Wedding March (1928) writer
- The Divine Lady (1929) intertitles
