= An Unseen Enemy =

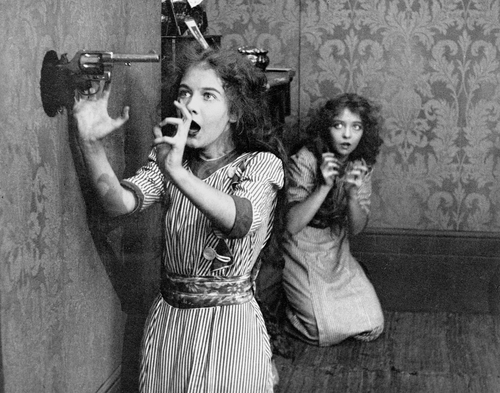
- Still with Lillian and Dorothy Gish
- Directed by: D. W. Griffith
- Written by: Edward Acker
- Starring: Lillian Gish; Dorothy Gish; Harry Carey; Elmer Booth; Robert Harron
- Cinematography: G. W. Bitzer
- Music by: Robert Israel (new score)
- Production company: Biograph Company
- Distributed by: General Film Company
- Release date: September 9, 1912
- Running time: 15–16 minutes (1 reel, full)
- Country: United States
- Language: Silent (English intertitles)

Play film; runtime 00:15:17.

An Unseen Enemy is a 1912 Biograph Company short silent film directed by D. W. Griffith, and was the first film to be made starring the actresses Lillian Gish and Dorothy Gish. A critic of the time stated that "the Gish sisters gave charming performances in this one-reel film". The film was shot in Fort Lee, New Jersey where early film studios in America's first motion picture industry were based at the beginning of the 20th century. Consistent with practice at that time, the actors in the cast and their roles are not listed in the film. (The car chase near the end was not filmed in Fort Lee. It began in Little Silver, NJ and ended in Oceanport, NJ, the movable Goose Neck Bridge connecting the two).

== Plot ==
A physician's death orphans his two adolescent daughters. Their older brother is able to convert some of the doctor's small estate to cash. It is late in the day, and with the banks closed he stores the money in his father's household safe. The slatternly housekeeper, aware of the money, enlists a criminal acquaintance to help crack the safe. They lock the daughters in an adjacent room, and the drunken housekeeper menaces them by brandishing a gun through a hole in the wall. The resourceful girls use the telephone to call their brother who has returned to town. He gets the message and organizes a rescue party.

== Cast ==
- Elmer Booth
- Lillian Gish
- Dorothy Gish
- Harry Carey Sr.
- Robert Harron
- Grace Henderson as The Unseen Enemy
- Charles Hill Mailes
- Walter Miller
- Henry B. Walthall
- Adolph Lestina
- Antonio Moreno as Man On Bridge, Flagging Car
- Erich von Stroheim as Man In Straw Hat Dancing At Lobby Desk

== Commentary ==
To emphasize their sisterhood, Lillian and Dorothy Gish had identical clothes and hairstyles, and made similar gestures. The other two films where the Gishes played sisters are The Lady and the Mouse (1913) and Orphans of the Storm (1922).

== See also ==
- Harry Carey filmography
- D. W. Griffith filmography
- Lillian Gish filmography
