= Mary Gish =

American actress (1876–1948)

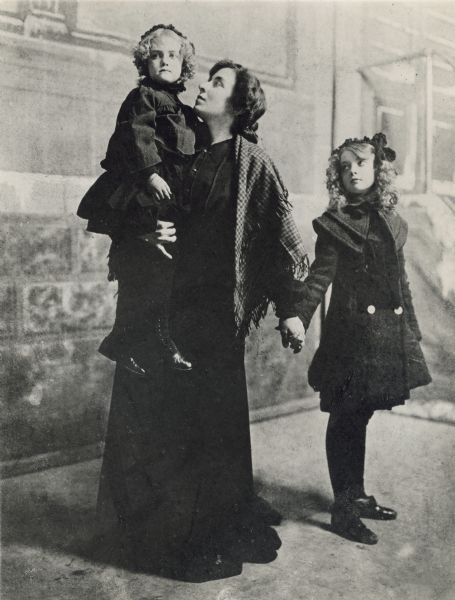
- Gish with her daughters Dorothy (left) and Lillian in 1900s
- Born: Mary Robinson McConnell; September 16, 1876; Dayton, Ohio, U.S.
- Died: September 17, 1948 (aged 72); New York City, U.S.
- Other name: Mae Barnard
- Occupation: Actress
- Spouse: James Leigh Gish (m. 1893; died 1912)
- Children: Lillian Gish; Dorothy Gish

Mary Robinson Gish (née McConnell; September 16, 1876 – September 17, 1948) was an American actress and the mother of screen stars Lillian and Dorothy Gish. She performed on stage as Mae Barnard.

== Life ==
Mary Gish was born in Dayton, Ohio, as Mary Robinson McConnell. She had a sister and two brothers. She was the granddaughter of Illinois state senator James Robinson, and she was descended from United States President Zachary Taylor.

On January 7, 1893, or January 8, 1893, she married James L. Gish (son of David Edwin Gish and Diana Caroline Waltz) in Clark County, Ohio. He was a traveling salesman. They were the parents of actresses Lillian and Dorothy. They lived with his mother after their marriage, including after the children were born. At some point the family moved from Springfield, Ohio, to Baltimore, and he was a partner in a candy store there. Mary worked in the store, and she made the girls' clothes by hand.

The girls' father, James Leigh Gish, died on January 9, 1912, when his daughters were 18 and 13 years old. (His christening record dated November 29, 1872, states his name as James Leonidas Gish.)

James, an alcoholic, left the family shortly before 1900, and Mary and the girls went to New York City. She obtained a legal separation in 1901, but they never divorced. The three of them lived in a Manhattan apartment, and she worked in a department store. She began performing on stage, earning $15 per week as an ingenue with Proctor's Stock Company, and her daughters soon followed in her footsteps. She used the stage name Mae Barnard "to keep secret from her family her shameful fall from homemaker to performer"; the name was a link to Francis Barnard, her ancestor. Mary "tried not to be too specific about their occupation when they visited relatives or made friends outside the occupation" because of actors' low social status of that time.

Around the 1890s Mary would operate a concession stand in Fort George Amusement Park in New York City.

When the girls began acting, Mary traveled with them and sometimes acted in small parts in their productions. In contrast to the "stage mother" stereotype, she was independent and "never lived through her children in order to support herself".

In 1917, Mary and her daughters traveled to England and France as members of D. W. Griffith's film company,"Biograph Studios", to make a film at the behest of the British Government. This film was almost certainly Hearts of the World (1918), which featured all three Gishes, rising star Bobby Harron, British Prime Minister Lloyd George, and Griffith himself. The purpose of this film was to change the neutral mindset of the American public regarding World War I.

In 1925 she went with them to Italy for the making of the film Romola.

=== Personal life and death ===
When Mary and her daughters were in Europe during World War I, an experience that "took them close to battle" resulted in Mary's suffering from shell shock. As a result, Lillian said in 1943, "I have had doctors and nurses in my home ever since, for 26 years." In the summer of 1921 she had a growth on her throat, and complications from the surgery resulted in a heart problem that "it was feared would prove fatal". While visiting Dorothy in London in 1925, Mary had a paralytic stroke. Lillian left her work in California to go to her mother. They returned to the United States on the RMS Mauretania accompanied by a doctor and a nurse. They spent time in New York City for Mary to rest before completing their trip to their home in Los Angeles. Mary had been an invalid for "a long period" when she died on September 17, 1948, in Columbia-Presbyterian Medical Center, the day after her 72nd birthday.

== Filmography ==
=== Film ===
| Year | Title | Role | Note |
|---|---|---|---|
| 1912 | Two Daughters of Eve | Lady in theatre crowd | Short |
| 1914 | Judith of Bethulia | Extra | Uncredited |
| 1915 | Letters Entangled | Grace's Aunt | Short, as Mary McDonnell |
| 1918 | Hearts of the World | A Refugee Mother | As Mrs. Mary Gish |

== Sources ==
- Affron, Charles (2001). Lillian Gish: Her Legend, Her Life. New York: Scribner. ISBN 978-0684855141
