= Dorothy Gish =

American actress (1898–1968)

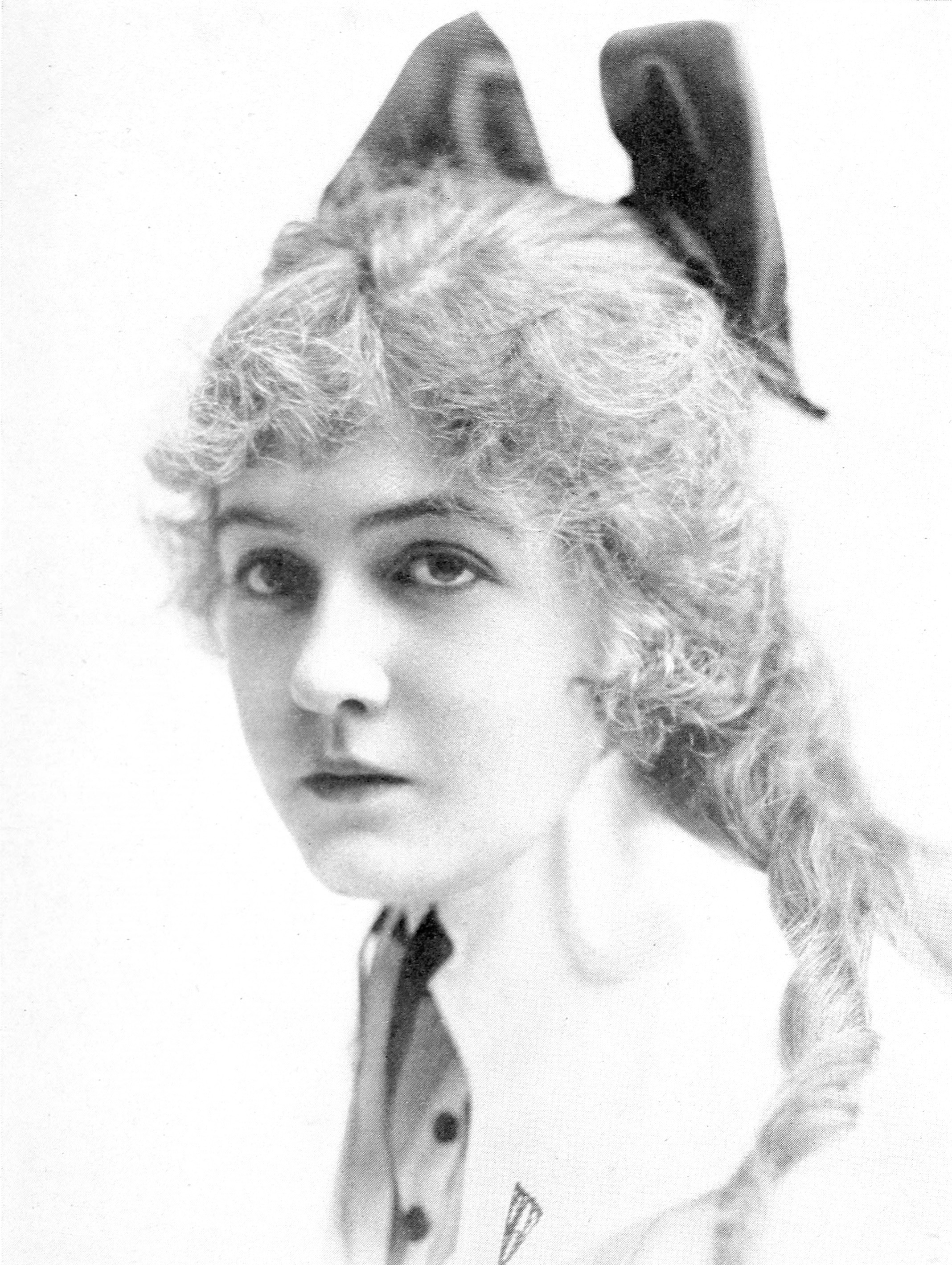
- Gish in 1916
- Born: Dorothy Elizabeth Gish; March 11, 1898; Dayton, Ohio, U.S.
- Died: June 4, 1968 (aged 70); Rapallo, Italy
- Occupation: Actress
- Years active: 1912–1963
- Spouse: James Rennie (m. 1920; div. 1935)
- Mother: Mary Robinson McConnell
- Relatives: Lillian Gish (sister)

Dorothy Elizabeth Gish (March 11, 1898 – June 4, 1968) was an American stage and screen actress. Dorothy and her older sister Lillian Gish were major movie stars of the silent era. Dorothy also had great success on the stage, and was inducted into the American Theater Hall of Fame. Dorothy Gish was noted as a fine comedian, and many of her films were comedies.

== Early life ==
Dorothy Gish was born in Dayton, Ohio. She had an elder sister, Lillian. The Gish sisters' mother, Mary, supported the family after her husband James Leigh Gish, a traveling salesman, abandoned the family in New York. Mary Gish, who was "a former actress and department store clerk", moved with her daughters to East St. Louis, Illinois, where she opened a candy and catering business. In 1902, at the age of four, Dorothy made her stage debut portraying the character "Little Willie" in East Lynne, an adaptation of the 1861 English novel by Ellen Wood.

In 1910, Mary heard from her husband's brother, Grant Gish, who lived in Shawnee, Oklahoma, and informed her that James was ill. He was in a hospital in nearby Norman, so Mary sent 17-year-old Lillian to visit him. At first, Lillian wrote back to her 12-year-old sister Dorothy that she planned to stay in Oklahoma and continue her education, but after seeing her father she admitted she missed her mother and sister. So, after a few months away from them, in the spring of 1912, she traveled back to East St. Louis. Soon afterward, their childhood friend, actress Mary Pickford, introduced the sisters to director D. W. Griffith, and they began performing as extras at the Biograph Studios in New York at salaries of 50 dollars a week. During his initial work with the sisters, Griffith found it difficult to distinguish one from the other, so he had the five years older Lillian wear a blue ribbon in her hair and Dorothy a red one. The girls, especially Lillian, impressed the director, so he included them in the entourage of cast and crew he took to California to produce films there.

== Career ==
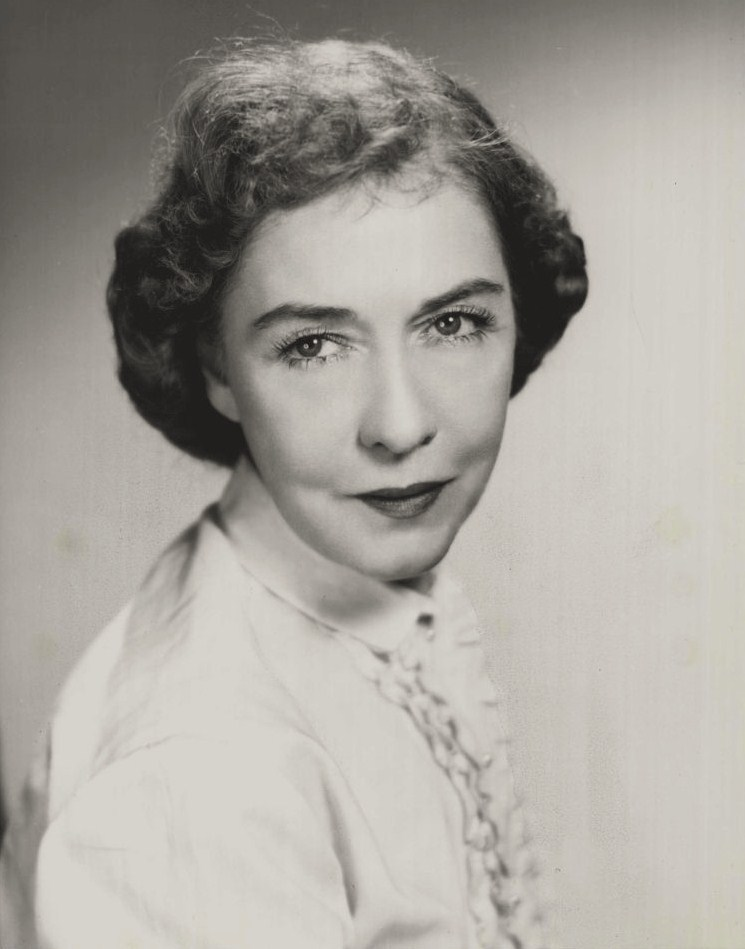
Gish in 1954

Dorothy and her sister debuted in Griffith's 1912 production An Unseen Enemy. She would ultimately perform in over 100 short films and features, many times with Lillian. Throughout her own career, however, Dorothy had to contend with ongoing comparisons to her elder or "big" sister by film critics, fellow actors, studio executives, and by other insiders in the motion picture industry. Such comparisons began even from the outset of the sisters' work for Biograph. Linda Arvidson, Griffith's first wife, recalls their initial work for the studio in her autobiography When The Movies Were Young:

Lillian and Dorothy just melted right into the studio atmosphere without causing a ripple. For quite a long time they merely did extra work in and out of pictures. Especially Dorothy, as Mr. Griffith paid her no attention whatsoever and she kept on crying and trailed along. She also continued to play in many one and two reel Biograph films, learning the difficult technique of silent film acting, and preparing for opportunity when it came. Dorothy was still a person of insignificance, but she was a good sport about it; a likable kid, a bit too perky to interest the big director, so her talents blushed unnoticed by Mr. Griffith. In The Unseen Enemy the sisters made their first joint appearance. Lillian regarded Dorothy with all the superior airs and graces of her rank. At a rehearsal of 'The Wife', of Belasco and DeMille fame, in which picture I played the lead, and Dorothy the ingénue, Lillian was one day an interested spectator. She was watching intently, for Dorothy had had so few opportunities, and now was doing so well, Lillian was unable to contain her surprise, and as she left the scene she said: "Why, Dorothy is good; she's almost as good as I am." Many more than myself thought Dorothy was better.

=== Near-fatal accident, 1914 ===
Dorothy Gish's budding film career almost ended on a street in Los Angeles the day after Thanksgiving in 1914. On Friday, November 26, the 16-year-old actress was struck and nearly killed by a "racing automobile". Newspapers and film-industry publications at the time reported the event and described the severe injuries Gish sustained. The near-fatal accident occurred as Dorothy was walking with Lillian at the intersection of Vermont and Prospect avenues. According to news reports, after the car struck her, it dragged her along the street for 40 to 50 feet. Other movie personnel who were standing together on a nearby sidewalk, including D. W. Griffith, witnessed Dorothy being hit.

The following day, the Los Angeles Times informed its readers about the accident:

... Miss Dorothy Gish, a moving picture actress, was seriously injured yesterday afternoon. Picked up unconscious, she was taken to the office of Dr. Tryon at number 4767 Hollywood boulevard, where it was found her injuries consisted of a crushed right foot, a deep cut in the right side, and bruises on all parts of her body. She was later removed to the home of her mother at LaBelle apartments, Fourth and Hope streets. The automobile that ran her down is owned by T. B. Loreno of No. 6636 Selma avenue, also of the moving picture game.

Subsequent news reports also describe the reaction of other pedestrians at the scene. The Chicago Sunday Tribune and trade papers reported that Dorothy's "horrified friends" rushed to her aid, with Griffith being among those who lifted the unconscious teenager into an ambulance and reportedly rode with her in the emergency vehicle. In addition to Gish's initial examination by the doctor identified by the Los Angeles Times, the Chicago newspaper and Motion Picture News stated that she was rushed to the hospital, where surgeons mended her "very badly torn" left side with "many stitches" and treated the area where one of her toes had been "cut off", presumably a toe from her badly damaged right foot.

At the time of the accident, Gish was completing a two-reel romantic comedy with actor W. E. Lawrence. The film, How Hazel Got Even, had already been delayed once at Reliance-Majestic Studios due to director Donald Crisp's bout with pneumonia. Completion of the short was postponed yet again, for over a month, while Gish recuperated. Originally scheduled for release on December 27, 1914, How Hazel Got Even was not distributed to theaters until mid-February 1915.

=== 1915–1928 ===
After recovering from the 1914 accident, Gish resumed her screen career the following year, performing in a series of two- and three-reel shorts as well as in longer, more complex films such as the five-reel productions Old Heidelberg, directed by John Emerson, and Jordan Is a Hard Road, once again under D. W. Griffith's direction. Increasingly, Dorothy's appeal to both producers and audiences continued to grow in 1915, leading W. E. Keefe in the June issue of Motion Picture Magazine to recognize her as "one of the most popular film stars on the Motion Picture screen". In an article about Gish in the cited issue, Keefe also recognizes that Dorothy, career-wise, was finally emerging from her sister's shadow:

A year ago she was known as Lillian's little sister. A year's growth has changed this. Today she is taller and weighs more than her "big" sister, and is known as Dorothy Gish without always being identified as "Lillian's sister".

In 1916 and 1917, Dorothy continued to expand her acting credentials by starring in a variety of five-reelers for Fine Arts Film Company or "Griffith's studio", which was a subsidiary of Triangle Film Corporation. Her work in those years required filming on locations in New York and on the West Coast.

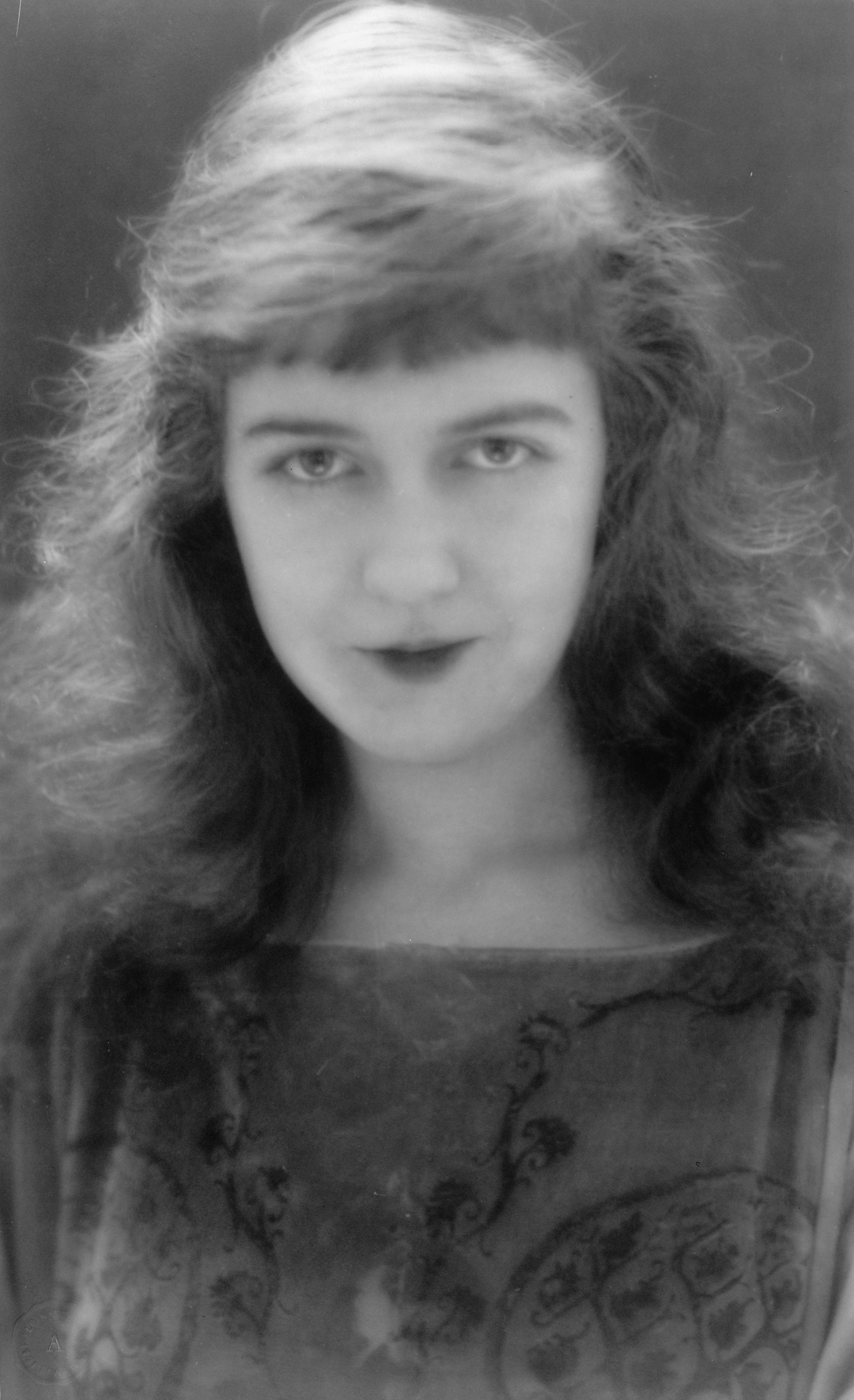
Gish, c. 1920

In the 1918 release Hearts of the World, a film about World War I and the devastation of France, Dorothy found her first cinematic foothold in comedy, striking a personal hit in a role that captured the essence of her sense of humor. As the "little disturber", a street singer, her performance was the highlight of the film, and her characterization on screen catapulted her into a career as a star of comedy films.

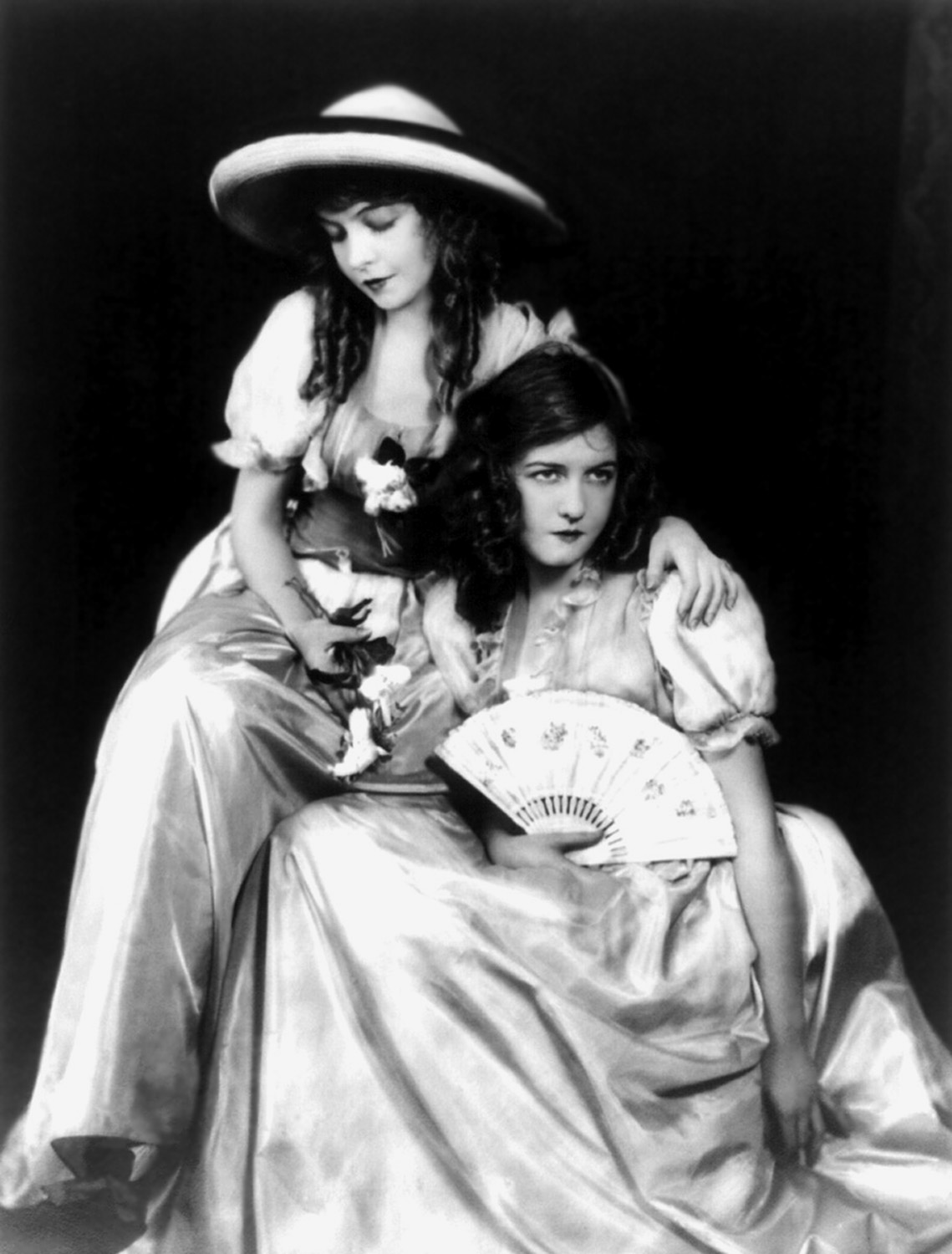
Dorothy (with fan) and her sister Lillian, 1921

Griffith did not use Dorothy in any of his earliest epics, but while he spent months working on The Birth of a Nation and Intolerance, Dorothy was featured in many feature-length films made under the banner of Triangle and Mutual releases. They were directed by young Griffith protégés such as Donald Crisp, James Kirkwood, and Christy Cabanne. Elmer Clifton directed a series of seven Paramount-Artcraft comedies with Dorothy that were so successful and popular that the tremendous revenue they raked in helped to pay the cost of Griffith’s expensive epics. These films were wildly popular with the public and the critics. She specialised in pantomime and light comedy, while her sister appeared in tragic roles. Dorothy became famous in this long series of Griffith-supervised films for the Triangle-Fine Arts and Paramount companies from 1918 through 1920, comedies that put her in the front ranks of film comedians. Almost all of these films are now considered to be lost films.

"And So I Am a Comedienne", an article published in Ladies Home Journal in July 1925, gave Dorothy a chance to recall her public persona: “And so I am a comedienne, though I, too, once wanted to do heroic and tragic things. Today my objection to playing comedy is that it is so often misunderstood by the audiences, both in the theater and in the picture houses. It is so often thought to be a lesser art and something which comes to one naturally, a haphazard talent like the amateur clowning of some cut-up who is so often thought to be ‘the life of the party’. In the eyes of so many persons comedy is not only the absence of studied effect and acting, but it is not considered an art.”

She made a film in England Nell Gwynn which led to three more films. Gish earned £41,000 for these movies.

=== Sound era and return to stage ===
When the film industry converted to talking pictures, Dorothy made one in 1930, the British crime drama Wolves. Earlier, in 1928 and 1929, her performances in the Broadway play Young Love and her work with director George Cukor renewed her interest in stagecraft and in the immediacy of performing live again. The light comedy had proven to be popular with critics and audiences in New York, in performances on the road in the United States, as well overseas in a London production. Those successes convinced her to take a respite from film-making.

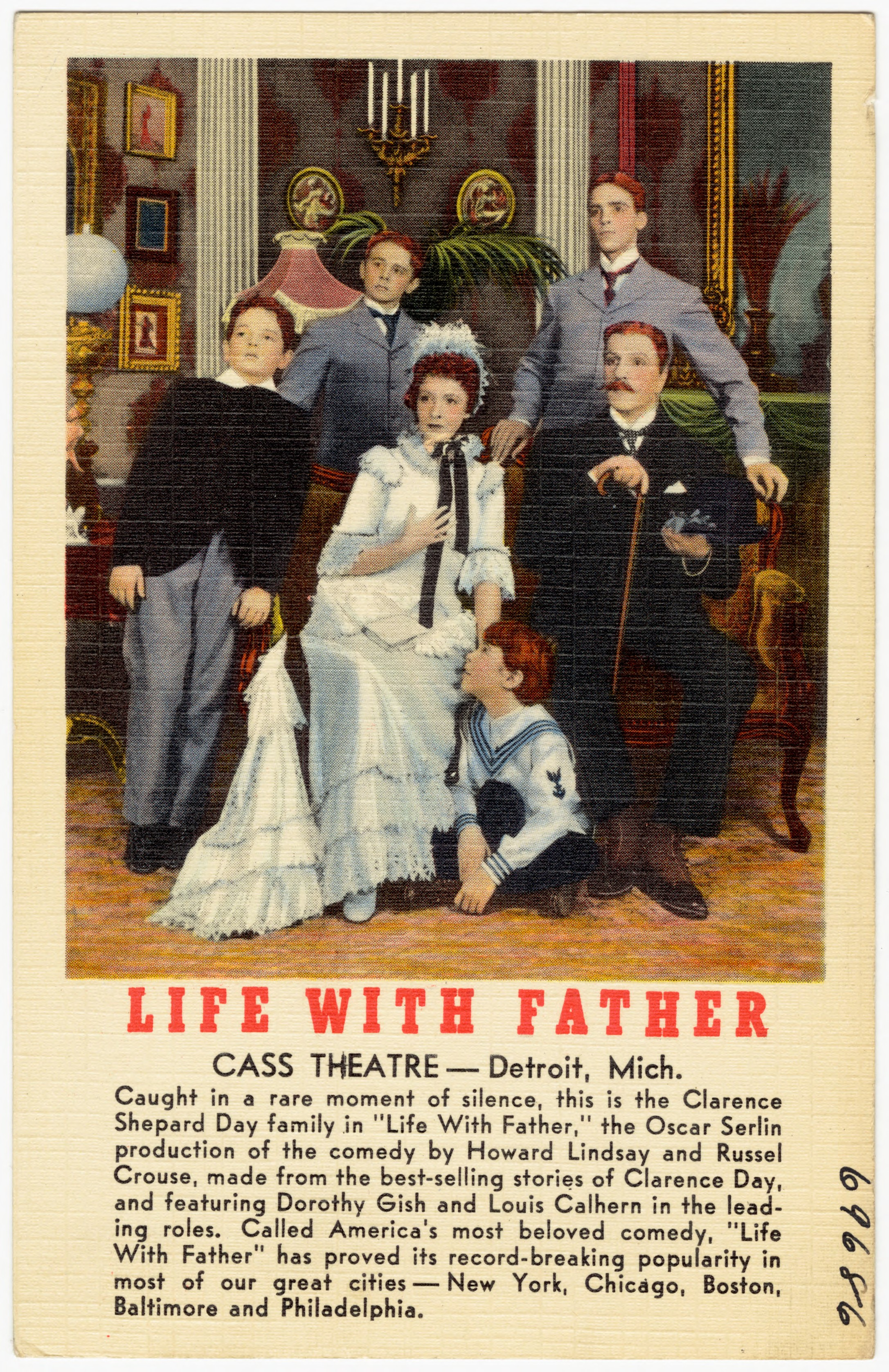
Postcard of Gish in Life with Father

In 1939, both Dorothy and Lillian Gish found the stage role of a lifetime. “Dorothy and I went to see the New York production of Life with Father, starring Howard Lindsay and Dorothy Stickney,” Lillian wrote in her autobiography. “After the performance I said: ‘This is the play we’ve been waiting for to take through America.’” Lillian predicted the popular play would be a perfect showcase for all the people who had seen the hundreds of films featuring Mary Pickford, Dorothy, and herself. She was introduced to Lindsay backstage, and immediately surprised the producers with her enthusiastic desire to head the first company to go on the road, with Dorothy taking the same part for the second road company, and the movie rights for Mary Pickford. Pickford did not make the film version, but the Gish sisters took the two road companies on extensive tours. Another stage success later in Gish's career was The Magnificent Yankee, which ran on Broadway at the Royale Theatre during the first half of 1946. Lillian in her pictorial book Dorothy and Lillian Gish repeats John Chapman's comments about her sister's work in that production: "'Miss [Dorothy] Gish and Mr. Calhern give the finest performances I have ever seen them in. She is a delight and a darling.'"

=== Television and final films ===
Television in the 1950s offered many stage and film actors the opportunity to perform in plays broadcast live. Dorothy ventured into the new medium, appearing on NBC's Lux Video Theatre on the evening of November 24, 1955, in a production of Miss Susie Slagle's. She and Lillian had previously performed that play together on screen, in Paramount Pictures' 1945 film adaptation.

"The truth is, that she did not know what she really wanted to do," wrote her sister, Lillian, in her autobiography. "She had always had trouble making decisions and assuming responsibilities, in some ways she had never grown up. She was such a witty and enchanting child that we enjoyed indulging her. First Mother and I spoiled her and later Reba, her friend, and her husband Jim. Reba called Dorothy 'Baby' and so did Jim. With the best intentions in the world, we all helped to keep her a child."

From 1930 until her death, she only performed in five more movies, including Our Hearts Were Young and Gay (1944), which was a hit for Paramount. Director Otto Preminger cast Dorothy in his 1946 film, Centennial Summer, and Mae Marsh appears in the film in one of her many bit parts. In the 1951 release The Whistle at Eaton Falls, a film noir drama film produced by Louis de Rochemont, Dorothy portrays the widow of a mill owner. On television during this period, she also made several appearances in anthology television series. Her final film role was in 1963 in another Otto Preminger production, The Cardinal, in which she plays the mother of the title character.

== Personal life ==
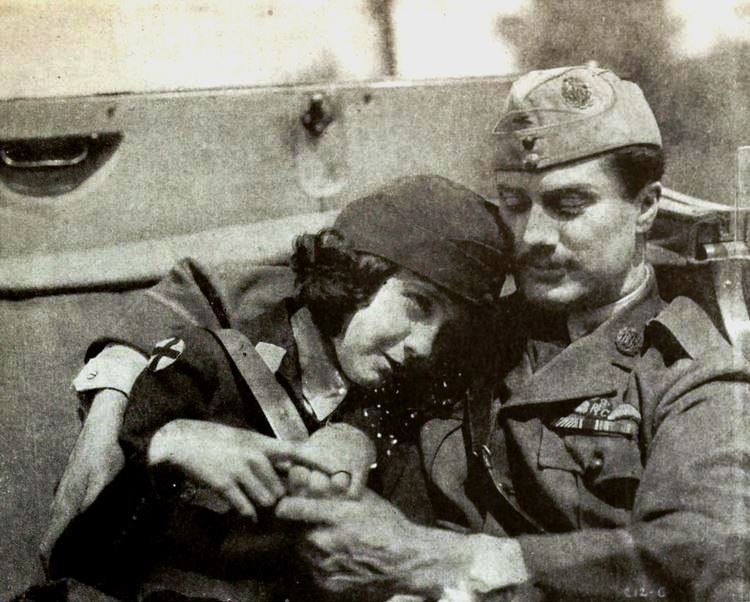
Film still of Gish with James Rennie in Flying Pat (1920)

Dorothy Gish married only once, to James Malachi Rennie (1890–1965), a Canadian-born actor who co-starred with her in two productions in 1920: Remodeling Her Husband, directed by sister Lillian, and in the comedy Flying Pat. In December 1920, the couple eloped to Greenwich, Connecticut, where they wed in a double ceremony in which Gish's friend, actress Constance Talmadge, married Greek businessman John Pialoglou. Gish and Rennie remained together until their divorce in 1935. Dorothy never married again.

== Death and legacy ==
Gish died aged 70 in 1968 from bronchial pneumonia at a clinic in Rapallo, Italy, where she had been a patient for two years to treat hardening arteries. Her sister Lillian, who was filming in Rome, was at her bedside. The New York Times reported the day after her death that the United States consulate in Genoa was making arrangements to cremate "Miss Gish's body" for return to the United States. The ashes were later entombed in Saint Bartholomew's Episcopal Church in New York City in the columbarium in the undercroft of the church. Lillian, who died in 1993, was interred beside her.

In recognition of her contributions to the motion picture industry, in 1960 Dorothy Gish was awarded a star on the Hollywood Walk of Fame at 6385 Hollywood Boulevard in Los Angeles.

The (since renamed) Gish Film Theatre and Gallery of Bowling Green State University's Department of Theatre and Film was named for Lillian and Dorothy Gish and was dedicated on that campus in 1976.

The Dorothy and Lillian Gish Prize was named for her by her sister. It awards a substantial cash prize annually to "a man or woman who has made an outstanding contribution to the beauty of the world and to mankind's enjoyment and understanding of life."

== Quotes ==
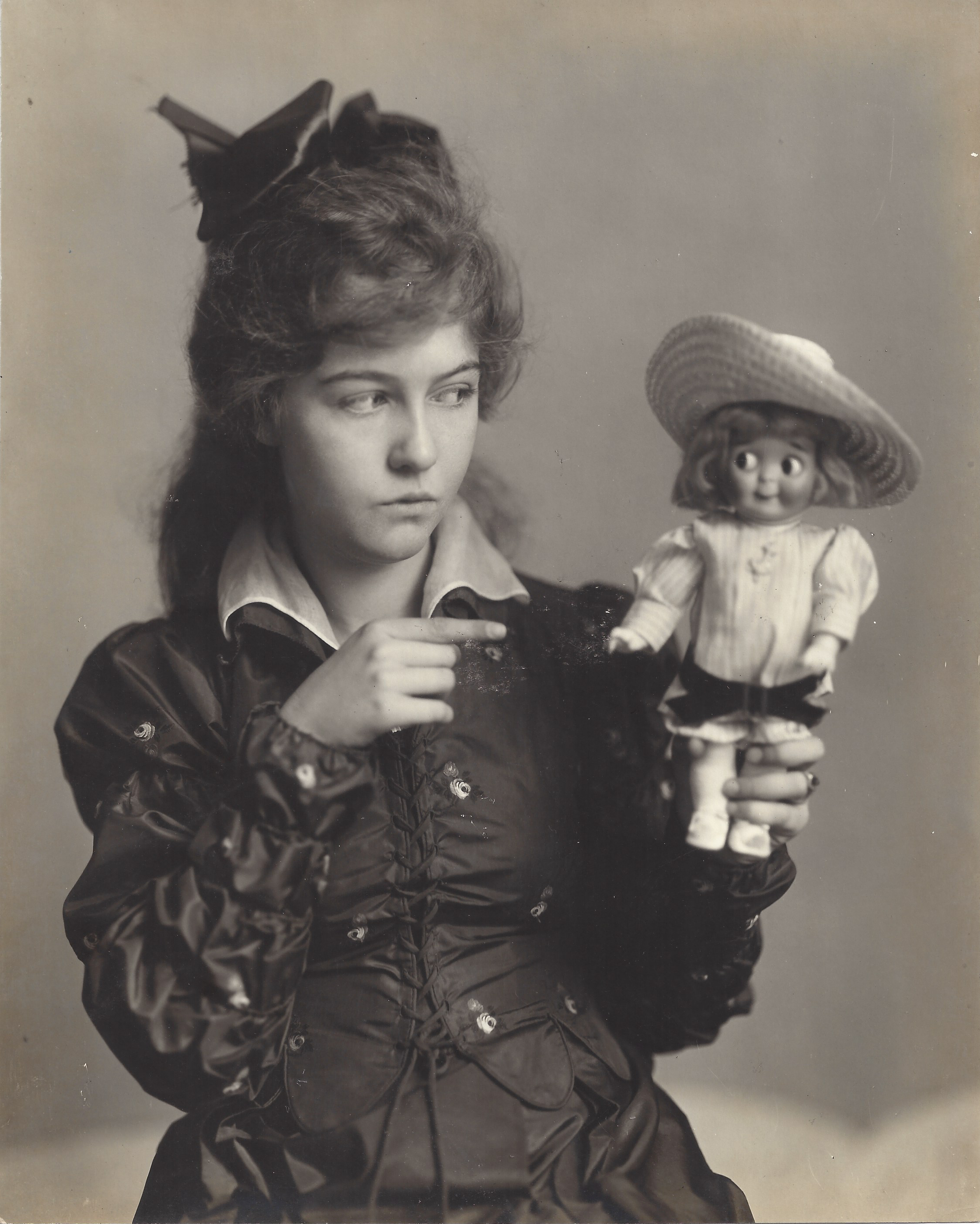
Dorothy Gish with a doll

Dorothy was much more talented than I am because she had wit. She could make people laugh. And they said I was as funny as a baby's open grave. I couldn't make people laugh, but Dorothy could make them cry and laugh, so therefore she was the better actress than I was. — Lillian Gish interview, 1987

== Partial filmography ==
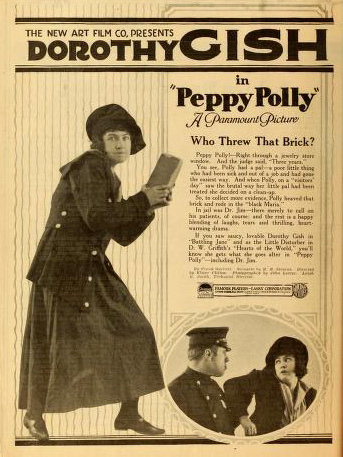
Peppy Polly (1919)

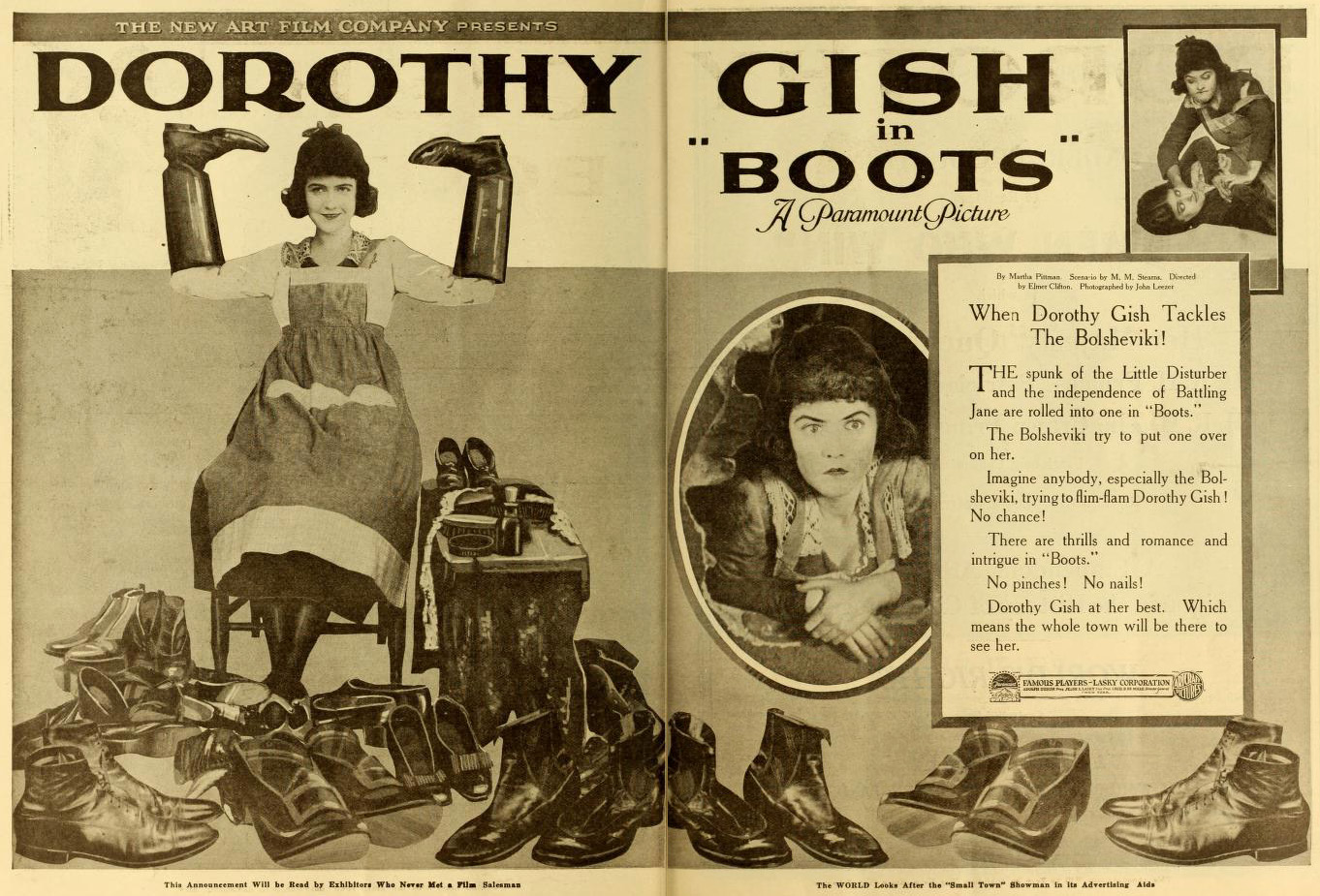
Boots (1919)

Year	Title	Role	Notes
1912	An Unseen Enemy	The sister	
1912	Two Daughters of Eve	In theatre crowd	
1912	So Near, yet So Far	A friend	Copy in Museum of Modern Art
1912	The Painted Lady	Belle at ice cream festival	
1912	The Musketeers of Pig Alley	Frizzy-haired woman in street	Copy in Library of Congress
1912	Gold and Glitter	On street	
1912	My Baby	Wedding guest	Copy in Museum of Modern Art
1912	The Informer	The Southern girl	Copies in Library of Congress
1912	Brutality		
1912	The New York Hat		
1912	My Hero	The young woman	
1912	The Burglar's Dilemma	Birthday wellwisher	
1912	A Cry for Help	Witness to accident	
1913	Oil and Water	In first audience	
1913	Broken Ways	In telegraph office	
1913	The Perfidy of Mary	Rose	
1913	The Lady and the Mouse	The second sister	
1913	Just Gold	The Sweetheart's sister	
1913	Red Hicks Defies the World	Hicks' sweetheart	
1913	The Vengeance of Galora		Unconfirmed
1913	The House of Discord	The daughter	Copy in Museum of Modern Art
1913	Almost a Wild Man	Miss Smart / Sideshow patron	
1914	Her Father's Silent Partner		
1914	Judith of Bethulia	The crippled beggar	
1914	The Floor Above	Stella Ford	
1914	Home, Sweet Home	Sister of Payne's sweetheart	
1914	The Rebellion of Kitty Belle		
1914	The Sisters	Carol	
1915	How Hazel Got Even	Hazel	
1915	His Lesson	Participant in mob scene	
1915	Jordan Is a Hard Road	Cora Findley	Lost film
1915	Old Heidelberg	Katie Huder	
1916	Gretchen the Greenhorn	Gretchen Van Houck	
1916	Betty of Greystone	Betty Lockwood	Incomplete film
1916	Little Meena's Romance	Meena	Lost film
1916	Susan Rocks the Boat	Susan Johnstone	Lost film
1916	The Children of the Feud	Sairy Ann	Lost film
1916	The Little School Ma'am	Nan	
1916	Atta Boy's Last Race	Lois Brandon	
1917	Stage Struck	Ruth Colby	Copy in Library of Congress
1917	Her Official Fathers	Janice	Lost film
1917	The Little Yank	Sallie Castleton	
1918	Hearts of the World	The Little Disturber	Copy in Cohen Media Group
1918	Battling Jane	Jane	Lost film
1918	The Hun Within	Beth	Copy in Cinémathèque française
1918	The Hope Chest	Sheila Moore	Lost film
1919	Boots	Boots	Lost film
1919	Peppy Polly	Polly	Lost film
1919	I'll Get Him Yet	Susy Faraday Jones	Lost film
1919	Nobody Home	Frances Wadsworth	Lost film
1919	Nugget Nell	Nugget Nell	Lost film
1919	Turning the Tables		Lost film
1920	Mary Ellen Comes to Town	Mary Ellen	Lost film
1920	Remodeling Her Husband	Jane Wakefield	Lost film
1920	Little Miss Rebellion	Grand Duchess Marie Louise	Lost film
1920	Flying Pat	Patricia Van Nuys	Copy in Cinémathèque française
1921	Orphans of the Storm	Louise Girard	
1921	The Ghost in the Garret	Delsie O'Dell	Lost film
1922	The Country Flapper	Jolanda Whiple	
1923	Fury	Minnie	Lost film
1923	The Bright Shawl	La Clavel	Copy in UCLA Film & Television Archive
1924	Romola	Tessa	Copy in UCLA Film & Television Archive
1925	Night Life of New York	Meg	Lost film
1925	The Beautiful City	Mollie	Lost film
1925	Clothes Make the Pirate	Betsy Tidd	Lost film
1925	Ben-Hur: A Tale of the Christ	Chariot Race Spectator	
1926	Nell Gwyn	Nell Gwyn	
1926	London	Mavis Hogan	Lost film
1926	Camille	Grace	
1927	Madame Pompadour	Madame Pompadour	
1927	Tip Toes	Tiptoes Kay	Lost film
1930	Wolves	Leila McDonald	
1944	Our Hearts Were Young and Gay	Mrs. Skinner	
1946	Centennial Summer	Mrs. Rogers	
1951	The Whistle at Eaton Falls	Mrs. Doubleday	
1963	The Cardinal	Celia	
