= Peppy Polly =

1919 film by Elmer Clifton

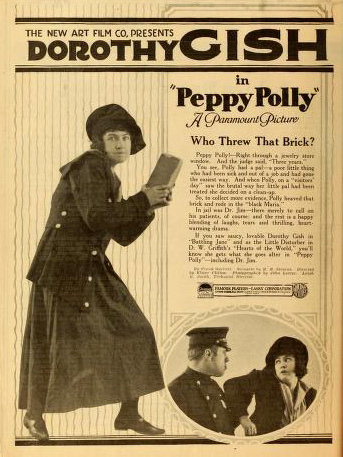
- Film's promotion in Moving Picture World, 1919
- Directed by: Elmer Clifton
- Written by: M. M. Stearns (scenario)
- Story by: Marjorie Raynale
- Produced by: New Art Film
- Starring: Dorothy Gish
- Cinematography: John Leezer
- Production company: New Art Film Company
- Distributed by: Famous Players–Lasky; Paramount Pictures
- Release date: April 6, 1919
- Running time: 50 minutes
- Country: United States
- Language: Silent (English intertitles)

Peppy Polly is a lost 1919 American silent drama film directed by Elmer Clifton and starring Dorothy Gish. D. W. Griffith produced, as he did for several of Gish's films.

== Plot ==
As described in a film magazine, Polly Shannon impresses Judge Monroe with her "pep" and is recommended for employment to Mrs. Kingsley Benedict, member of a committee investigating the Melville reform school for girls. Polly goes along, meets an old friend who is now an inmate, and learns that the conditions are deplorable and that the committee is being deceived. She and Judge Monroe plan for her to commit a theft so that she can be sentenced to Melville to aid in the investigation. Matters are complicated after she becomes an inmate and the judge dies, and she becomes the victim of the cruel matron's persecution. At the asylum she meets a young doctor whom she learns to love and the two manage to bring the truth to light. Polly is released and they are married.

== Cast ==
- Dorothy Gish as Polly
- Richard Barthelmess as Dr. James Merritt
- Edward Peil, Sr. as Judge Monroe
- Emily Chichester as Sarah Keene
- Kate Toncray as Mrs. Kingsley Benedict
- Josephine Crowell as Mrs. Crafton

== Release ==
In New Zealand, Peppy Polly was screened as early as January, 1920, in Wellington, where it played concurrently in two different theaters. The following month, it was screened at the Octagon Theatre in Dunedin. It premiered in Whangārei at the Britannia Theatre in July, succeeding the Owen Moore-starring Rolling Stones. The film was screened in Blenheim in late 1920, ending a run at the Princess Theatre on October 12.
