= Wolves (1930 film) =

1930 film

- Dorothy Gish and Charles Laughton in the film
- Directed by: Albert de Courville
- Written by: Reginald Berkeley; Georges Toudouze
- Produced by: Herbert Wilcox; British and Dominions Film Corporation
- Starring: Charles Laughton; Dorothy Gish; Malcolm Keen
- Cinematography: David Kesson; Roy F. Overbaugh
- Production company: Blattner Studios
- Distributed by: Woolf & Freedman Film Service; J.H. Hoffberg Company
- Release date: May 1930
- Running time: 57 minutes (1930); 37 minutes (1936)
- Country: United Kingdom
- Language: English

Wolves (re-release title: Wanted Men) is a 1930 British crime film directed by Albert de Courville and starring Charles Laughton, Dorothy Gish and Malcolm Keen. It was written by Reginald Berkeley based on the play Parmi Les Loups by Georges Toudouze It was Gish's first sound film and was Laughton's second talkie (but his first sound drama), having completed a film of a musical variety performance earlier the same year.

== Preservation status ==
The British Film Institute National Archive holds a collection of ephemera but no film or video materials.

== Synopsis ==
The screenplay concerns a woman who is captured by a gang of criminals operating in the Arctic, only for the leader to later help her escape.

== Cast ==
- Charles Laughton as Captain Job
- Dorothy Gish as Leila McDonald
- Malcolm Keen as Pierre
- Jack Osterman as Hank
- Arthur Margetson as Mark
- Franklyn Bellamy as Pablo
- Griffith Humphreys as Semyon
- Andrews Engelmann as Pfeiffer
- Betty Bolton as Naroutcha

== Releases ==
Of 57 minutes original duration, it was re-released in 1936 in a 37-minute version retitled Wanted Men.

== Production ==
It was produced by Herbert Wilcox's British and Dominions Film Corporation, but filmed at the Blattner Studios whilst sound equipment was being installed at Wilcox's nearby Imperial Studios, and the sound was added after filming was completed.

== Reception ==
Kine Weekly wrote: "It lacks imagination in treatment, is artificial, and is devoid of dramatic intensity. ... Charles Laughton is not happy in the role of Job, a Lancastrian. For one thing, he is not sure of his accent, and he also tries to temper his performance with humour, and this destroys the virility of the role. Malcolm Keen is a little more sure of his ground as Pierre, and Arthur Margetson is fair as Mark, but the rest are decidedly weak. Dorothy Gish displays emotional ability for a few brief moments, but the part does not do justice to her undoubted talents. The producer has killed the dramatic intensity of the stage play by trying to impart a popular touch. The introduction of song and the use of musical accompaniment in the opening scenes holds up the action and destroys the atmosphere."

The Daily Film Renter wrote: "The drama largely arises from Pierre's lust for the girl and the cleverness with which Job, apparently for the same reason, defeats his attempts to seize her. Malcolm Keen acts very well indeed as the half-caste, and Laughton's cleverness leaves the real character and aims of Job in doubt until the big scene, when he faces the raving 'wolves' while Mark gets the girl away. Dorothy Gish's command of subtle facial expression is again demonstrated in Wolves; her voice records well."

Variety wrote of the 1936 re-release: "Everybody makes mistakes when young. This one was made by Charles Laughton in his native land back in 1931, and it's still hanging over his head. ... The director is not billed; wisely, he decided to remain anonymous. Picture came over here in eight reels, but the World theatre on West 49th street, New York, cut it down to 35 minutes. The remainder, if cut up further, would make excellent celluloid collar and cuff sets."
