= Juanita Pitts =

African-American tap dancer

Juanita Pitts was an African-American tap dancer. During performances, she was known to wear a tuxedo and Oxford shoes, which was common attire for male tap dancers at the time. However, during her life she "danced in relative obscurity".

Pitts was from Philadelphia and performed on stage and in clubs as a headliner, mainly in the 1930s and 1940s. She danced an act titled "Pitts and Pitts" and performed with her husband, Leroy, until he became ill. Pitts wore men's suits while performing, including a white three-piece suit, and she "had a style of close-to-the-floor rhythm tapping". In 1945, she appeared in the short film It Happened in Harlem, credited on movie posters as "Pitter-Patter" Pitts. Her dancing career continued on into the mid-1950s, and she performed at the Howard Theatre in the 1950s as well as at smaller clubs and the Apollo in New York City.

The Village Voice stated that after tap dancer Louise Madison, Pitts was "the best among the female rhythm tappers" and she "could dance toe to toe with the great male dancer Teddy Hale". Tap dancer LaVaughn Robinson said she performed at the Two Bit Club, stating, "And anytime she came through there, she had a job. Do you understand what I'm saying? And regardless to who the dancers was, if she came through and wanted to work....she was always welcome to dance at the Two Bit Club." Tap dancer Frances Nealy mentioned she saw Pitts for the first time at Club Eureka in Sacramento, California, later reflecting, "Well, she was such a terrific dancer. I'd never seen a woman dance like she did before. She danced like the guys." In 2007, tap dancer Jason Samuels Smith mentioned that important people in tap dance are often omitted from the history when tap is taught, including Pitts.

Around 1998, Pitts was included in a touring film and photo exhibition from the Philadelphia Folklore Project. A 2005 documentary titled "Plenty of Good Woman Dancers: African American Woman Hoofers From Philadelphia" includes footage of Pitts. A 2009 performance titled "Thank You, Gregory" gave tribute to Pitts, along with other dancers in tap history. A 2016 performance named "While I Have the Floor", by Ayodele Casel, gave tribute to "tap’s forgotten women" including Pitts, Jeni LeGon and Lois Bright. A section of the dance performance "Tap in Time" was inspired by Juanita Pitts.

== See also ==
- List of dancers
