= Vanita Smythe =

American singer

- Also known as: Vanita Smythe Pauling
- Born: Vannie Smith; January 13, 1925; Detroit, Michigan, United States
- Died: January 18, 1994 (aged 69) Detroit, Michigan, United States
- Genres: Blues, jazz
- Occupations: Singer and actress
- Years active: 1945–1950
- Label: Regal Records

Vannie Smith, known professionally as Vanita Smythe (January 13, 1925 – January 18, 1994) was an American blues and jazz singer and actress. She was professionally active between 1945 and 1950, making eight soundies, two motion pictures and releasing a couple of singles.

== Life and career ==
Vannie Smith was born in Detroit, Michigan, United States. The third of eight children, her parents were Grady and Gertrude McCray Smith, and she was named after her maternal grandmother, Lou Vannie Donaldson.

In a professional capacity she was first mentioned in the Indianapolis Recorder in August 1945, named as Vannie Smith and being the star of Billy Williams' Creole Follies, a week-long show at the 440 Club. However, the following month she appeared billed as Vanita Smythe at the Cotton Club in Buffalo, New York. She came to the attention of the fledgling film director, William Forest Crouch, who produced and directed soundies through Filmcraft Productions in New York. Between January and May 1946, Smythe was filmed in eight of them. Several of the soundies also featured the pianist and songwriter Dan Burley or fellow songwriter Claude Demetrius. Smythe's roles varied, incorporating some acting and singing, and several of the songs within the soundies were written by notables such as Louis Jordan, Hot Lips Page, Burley and Demetrius. The following year, Smythe's filmed rendition of "They Raided the Joint" was integrated into Ebony Parade, an Astor Pictures film that opened in New York in early July. The film was a collection of old soundies, each introduced by the "fortune teller", Mantan Moreland. Through these connections, Smythe was cast as "Rusty", in Louis Jordan's 1947 Astor Pictures film, Reet, Petite, and Gone, which was also produced and directed by Crouch.

In April 1947, Smythe performed at Henry Armstrong's Melody Room in Harlem on the same bill as the 5 Kings. In June she trod the boards again at Smalls Paradise in Harlem, in a one-night show put on by Dan Burley. In October, she appeared as part of the annual benefit dance put on by the Good Hearts Welfare Association at Harlem's Renaissance Ballroom. Smythe's career went into a hiatus before signing in March 1950 to Regal Records. She recorded four tracks for the label; "Lonesome For You", "I Want My Baby Back", "Until I Fell For You" (written by Howard Biggs), and "You Got Me Crying Again". "Lonesome For You" / "I Want My Baby Back" was issued as a single early in 1950, while "Until I Fell For You" / "You Got Me Crying Again" was released later the same year. Neither record was a commercial success. The sum total of her stage performances did not run into double figures, and all of them took place around New York City. Smythe married in 1951 and her professional career came to a close.

Vanita Smythe Pauling died in Detroit on January 18, 1994, aged 69.

== Family life ==
On March 23, 1951, Smythe married Clarence Otto Pauling in Springfield, Tennessee. The groom was the brother of Lowman "Pete" Pauling Jr. of the "5" Royales. Clarence and Vanita were later divorced, on a date probably between 1960 and 1966. There is no definitive record of any children of the union.

== Filmography ==
=== Soundies ===
- Does You Do Or Does You Don't (released August 5, 1946)
- Low, Short and Squatty (released December 2, 1946)
- Back Door Man (released May 27, 1946)
- I Need A Playmate (released October 14, 1946)
- They Raided the Joint (released June 15, 1946)
- Get It Off Your Mind (released September 2, 1946)
- Sho Had A Wonderful Time (released November 17, 1946)
- What Good Am I Without You (released December 23, 1946)

=== Films ===
- Ebony Parade (1947)
- Reet, Petite, and Gone (1947)

== Discography ==
- 1950 : "Lonesome For You" / "I Want My Baby Back" – Regal Records
- 1950 : "Until I Fell For You" / "You Got Me Crying Again" – Regal Records
