= Chris Columbus (musician) =

American jazz drummer (1902–2002)

- Birth name: Joseph Christopher Columbus Morris
- Also known as: Crazy Chris Columbo, Chris Columbo, Joe Morris
- Born: June 17, 1902; Greenville, North Carolina, U.S.
- Died: August 20, 2002 (aged 100); New Jersey, U.S.
- Genres: Jazz
- Occupation: Drummer
- Instrument: Drums
- Years active: 1920s–1990s
- Formerly of: Wild Bill Davis, Duke Ellington, Al Grey, Milt Buckner, Floyd Smith, Dizzy Gillespie, Louis Jordan, Louis Armstrong, Ella Fitzgerald

Joseph Christopher Columbus Morris (June 17, 1902 – August 20, 2002), better known as Crazy Chris Columbo or just Chris Columbo, was an American jazz drummer. He was sometimes credited as Joe Morris on record, though he is no relation to free jazz guitarist Joe Morris or trumpeter Joe Morris.

== Career ==
Columbus was active as a jazz musician from the 1920s into the 1990s, and was a father figure to Sonny Payne. He led his own band from the 1930s into the late 1940s, holding a residency at the Savoy Ballroom for a period. During the mid 1940s he also began drumming behind Louis Jordan, remaining with him until 1952. In the mid-to-late 1950s, Columbus backed Wild Bill Davis's organ combo, and he recorded with Duke Ellington in 1967. He worked again as a leader in the 1970s, in addition to doing tours of Europe with Davis. While in France he played with Floyd Smith, Al Grey, Eddie "Cleanhead" Vinson, Buddy Tate, and Milt Buckner.

Prior to a stroke which partially paralyzed him in 1993, Columbo was the oldest working musician in Atlantic City.

Columbo got his first professional gig playing with Fletcher Henderson in 1921. Between the 1920s and the 1960s, he played at most of the city's nightclubs, and led the Club Harlem orchestra for 34 years until 1978, when the club shut its doors. Thereafter, Columbo's band went on to perform at practically every Atlantic City casino hotel. At the time of his stroke, he was playing regularly at the Showboat.

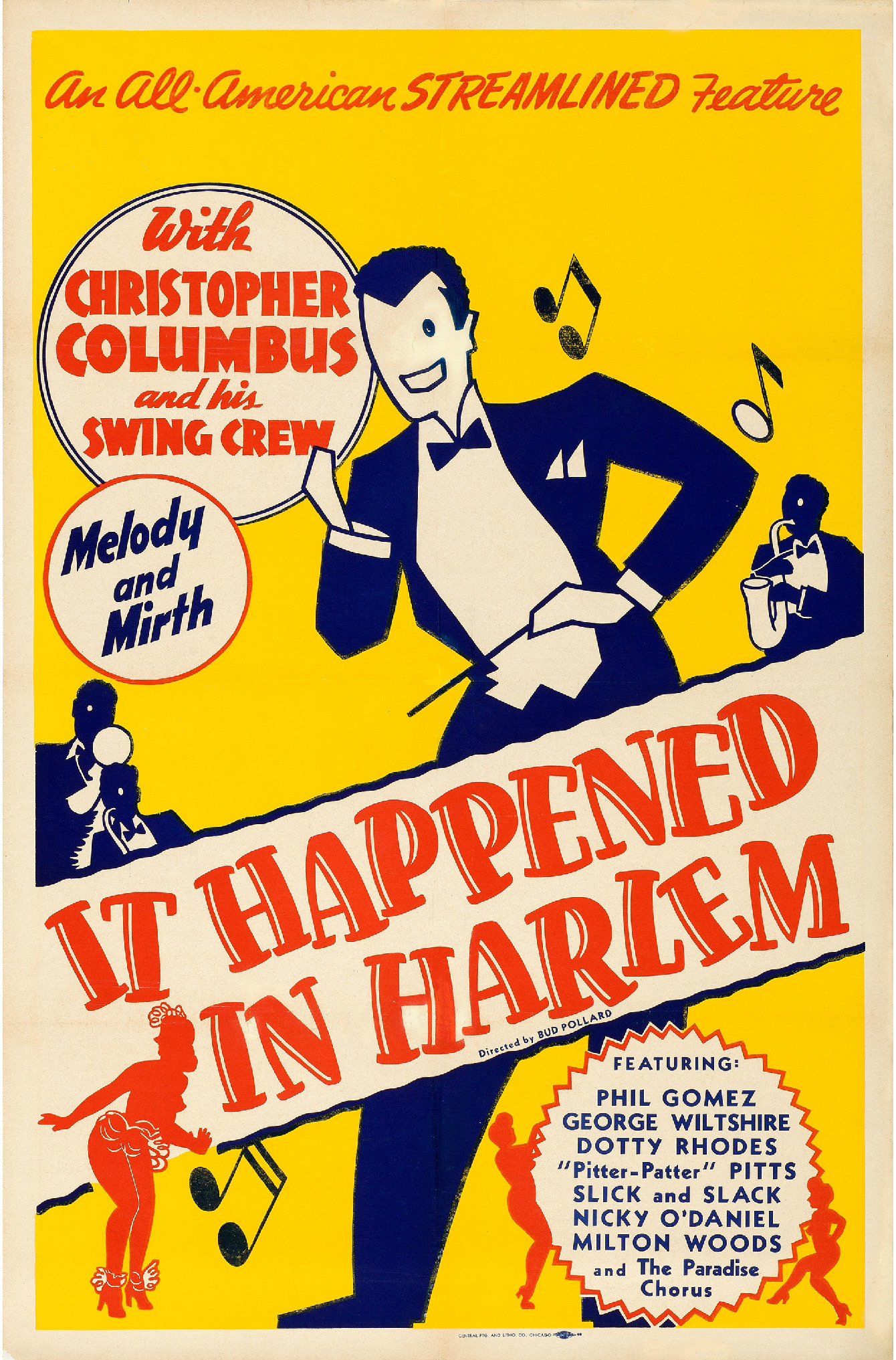
Poster for the 1945 film It Happened in Harlem

Columbo worked, recorded, and toured with prominent jazz artists including Duke Ellington, Dizzy Gillespie, Louis Jordan, Louis Armstrong, Wild Bill Davis, and Ella Fitzgerald. Columbo did an album on the Strand label called Jazz: Re-Discovering Old Favorites by the Chris Columbo Quintette [sic] including a version of "Summertime" featuring organist Johnny "Hammond" Smith. This record (with flip side an uptempo minor blues called "Minerology" [sic]) was fairly successful on radio in the early 1960s. Columbo flipped his sticks in the air, bounced them off the floor and often leaped from a motorcycle seat which was his drum throne. Columbo also appeared in the 1945 film It Happened in Harlem, based on the Harlem nightclub Smalls Paradise, and the 1947 film Look Out Sister.

== Family ==
Chris is survived by two daughters, Yvette Mathison and JoAnn Morris, grand daughters Sheril Plunkett and Tana Lee, and great grand-children Dylan Plunkett, Kacie Mae Plunkett and Chance Lee.

== Death ==
Columbo suffered a stroke in 1993 and died in 2002; he was 100 years old. To recognize his contributions to the history and music of Atlantic City, a section of Kentucky Avenue, home of Club Harlem, was renamed Chris Columbo Lane in 2005.

== Discography ==
=== As leader ===
- "Lonely Street" // "Dancing On My Heart" (Double AA 114, 1955)
- "Floyd's Guitar Blues" // "Wishy Washy" (King 4991, 1956) – with Johnny Grimes-trumpet/vibes, Jimmy Tyler-alto/tenor sax, Nick Palmer-tenor/baritone sax, John Wiegand-organ, Floyd Smith-guitar.
- "Oh Yeah!, Pt. 1" // "Oh Yeah!, Pt. 2" (King 5012, 1957) – with Gil Askey-trumpet, Jimmy Tyler-tenor sax, Johnny Hammond Smith-organ, Floyd Smith-guitar.
- Stranger on the Shore" // "You Can't Sit Down" (Battle 45904, 1962)
- Jazz: Re-Discovering Old Favorites (Strand SL-1044, 1962) – reissued as Summertime in 1963 (Strand SL-1095).
- "Summertime" // "Minerology" (Strand 25056, 1963) – with Johnny Hammond Smith.
- "Minerology" // "Summertime" (Casino 1305, 1963) – reissue
- "I Can't Stop Loving You" // "Mr. Wonderful" (Maxx 327, 1964)

=== As sideman ===
- Here's Wild Bill Davis (Epic LG-1004 [10" LP], 1954)
- Wild Bill Davis: On The Loose (Epic LN-1121 [10" LP], 1954)
- Wild Bill Davis At Birdland (Epic LN-3118, 1955) – reissued as Lullaby Of Birdland in 1972.
- Wild Bill Davis: Evening Concerto (Epic LN-3308, 1955)
- Duke Ellington/Ella Fitzgerald/Oscar Peterson: The Greatest Jazz Concert In The World (Pablo 2625-704, 1967 [rel. 1975]) – Columbus is the Ellington orchestra's drummer at this Hollywood Bowl concert.
- Wild Bill Davis: Impulsions (Disques Black & Blue 33.037, 1972)
- Al Grey & Wild Bill Davis (Disques Black & Blue 33.041, 1972) – with Eddie "Cleanhead" Vinson.
- Floyd Smith: Floyd's Guitar Blues (Disques Black & Blue 33.046, 1972)
- Buddy Tate & Wild Bill Davis (Disques Black & Blue 33.054, 1972) – reissued on CD as Broadway in 1987 by Black & Blue (233.054).
- Milt Buckner: Black And Blue Stomp (Disques Black & Blue 33.061, 1973)
- Al Grey: Grey's Mood (Disques Black & Blue 33.085, 1973–1975 [rel. 1979])
