= Roxie Joynes Campanella =

American showgirl

- Roxie Joynes Doles (later Campanella) from a 1954 newspaper photo
- Born: Roxie Joynes; June 22, 1916; Cape Charles, Virginia
- Died: March 14, 2004 (age 87); Woodland Hills, California
- Other name: Roxie Doles
- Occupations: Nurse, showgirl, philanthropist
- Spouse(s): John T. Doles, Roy Campanella

Roxie Joynes Campanella (June 22, 1916 – March 14, 2004), was an American nurse, showgirl, socialite and philanthropist. As the third wife of baseball star Roy Campanella, she was active on behalf of people with spinal cord injuries.

== Early life and education ==
Roxie Joynes was born in Cape Charles, Virginia, the daughter of Samson Shawnee Joynes and Emily Young Joynes. She attended Tidewater Institute, a Black school in Cheriton, Virginia, and was a nursing student at St. Philip's Hospital, a Black hospital and nursing school in Richmond, Virginia.

== Career ==
Joynes was a model and showgirl in the 1940s. She won a prize in a costume contest at the 1941 Artists and Models Ball in Chicago. She appeared as a dancer in the soundie Caldonia (1945) and the feature Reet, Petite, and Gone (1947). Her stage credits included a role in Dream with Music on Broadway. During her first marriage, she was active in Harlem society, as a member of The Moles, and of Sigma Wives, the women's auxiliary of the Black fraternal organization Phi Beta Sigma. She also organized other young women to campaign for her husband in 1950, and worked as a hostess on a cruise ship.

Joynes married former Brooklyn Dodgers baseball player Roy Campanella in 1964, about six years after he was paralyzed in a 1958 car accident. The couple regularly attended games at Dodger Stadium in Los Angeles, and visited newly paralyzed people in rehabilitation. She continued to attend games and visit hospital patients alone, after Campanella's 1993 death.

The Roy and Roxie Campanella Foundation was established in 1994, to provide scholarships to students in physical therapy programs, and equipment for people with spinal cord injuries. In 2003, she auctioned souvenirs of Campanella's baseball career to raise over $60,000 for the foundation's work.

== Personal life ==
Joynes married twice. Her first husband was attorney and politician John T. Doles Jr. They married in 1947, and had two children, Joni and John. They divorced in the early 1960s. She married her neighbor Roy Campanella in 1964, and he adopted her children. She died from colon cancer in 2004, at the age of 87 (not 77, as reported in the Los Angeles Times), in Woodland Hills, California. "Roxie was a remarkable woman," said announcer Vin Scully on the occasion. "She was a true inspiration, just as Roy was."
