= Ebony Parade =

1947 American musical compilation film with African American performers

- Movie poster for Ebony Parade
- Produced by: William Forest Crouch
- Starring: Cab Calloway; Count Basie; The Mills Brothers; Vanita Smythe; Mantan Moreland; Mabel Lee; Ruby Hill; Francine Everett; Dorothy Dandridge; Pat Flowers
- Distributed by: Astor Pictures
- Release date: April 1947
- Running time: 30 minutes
- Country: United States
- Language: English

Ebony Parade is a 1947 American musical compilation film made from footage of African-American performers. The three-reel film featured jazz music from many acts (usually from soundies) with interstitial segments featuring Mantan Moreland as a comedic magician. Advertised as including 20 great stars, it was an Astor Pictures release. The National Museum of African American History and Culture has a poster for the film. Getty Images also has an image of a poster from the film.

== Cast ==
- Cab Calloway
- Count Basie
- The Mills Brothers
- Vanita Smythe
- Mantan Moreland
- Mable Lee
- Ruby Hill
- Francine Everett
- Dorothy Dandridge
- Pat Flowers
- Day, Dawn, and Dusk
- The Jubalaires
