= Pat Rainey =

American singer and actress (1925–1998)

- Also known as: Pat Rau
- Born: Patricia Theresa Rainey; April 27, 1925; Boston, Massachusetts, United States
- Died: April 13, 1998 (aged 72) Westborough, Massachusetts, United States
- Genres: Jazz, Blues
- Occupations: Singer, actress
- Label: Gold Medal

Pat Rainey (April 27, 1925 – April 13, 1998) was an American singer and actress. Rainey was the daughter of attorney and politician Julian Rainey.

== Background ==
She was the daughter of Julian David Rainey and Dorothy Esther Akiman who married in 1922. She was born on April 27, 1925. Her father Julian was once New England's highest paid black man in public service. Her mother Dorothy died in Boston in 1932. The following year, her father married Gwendolyn Peterson and on September 23, 1934, her half-sister Sheila Emily Rainey was born.

By the late 1940s, Pat Rainey had gained fame as a singer and actress. She was also believed to be romantically involved with Egypt's King Farouk and the boxer Joe Louis.

== Career ==
In 1947, Rainey left Boston for Broadway to begin her singing career. She found work as a show girl the Zanzibar Night Club which was popular at the time. By February 1949, the 10" single "Gotta Love You 'Til I Die" / "Headin' For A Heartache" was released on Gold Medal GM 949. The single was reviewed by Billboard with favor for the A side while the B side prompted negative comparisons to Dinah Washington. By March that year, the single was being touted in an ad as "the hottest record of the year." In January, 1951, she was appearing regularly at New York's Chez Vito, a small venue situated in the Hotel Maurice. She had previously appeared at the Hotel Maurice in early 1950.

She appeared on the cover of the November 27, 1952 issue of Jet. According to the magazine, she was arrested five months prior to that for prostitution and drug use. In a courtroom before Judge Peter Horne, George Roach, a white policeman, testified in court that he had phoned her for a date. He later claimed to have found a hypodermic needle and heroin in her room. She was found guilty of prostitution; with the drug charges to be seen to at another trial. At the end of the trial, she was given a suspended sentence. Special Sessions Judge Edward J. Breslin granted the suspension on condition she return to Boston with her father.

Some three months after her last court appearance, it was reported in the April 30, 1953 issue of Jet that she was making a sensational comeback at the exclusive Storyville club in her Boston hometown.

In 1955, at the age of 28, she was rumored to be romantically involved with Farouk, the former king of Egypt. They met while she was performing at the KitKat club in Rome.

== Later years ==
She left the music business in 1961 and disappeared from view. Years later in 1981, Boston newspapers reported that she was employed as a social worker.

== Death ==
She died as Pat Rau at the Westborough Health Care Center, Westborough, Massachusetts on April 13, 1998.

== Discography ==
Releases
Act	Title	Label and cat	Year	Notes #
Four Notes of Rhythm with vocal by Pat Rainey	"Gotta Love You 'Til I Die" / "Headin' For A Heartache"	Gold Medal GM 949	1949	

== Filmography ==
Film
Title	Role	Director	Year	Notes #
Reet, Petite, and Gone	Pat Rains	William Forest Crouch	1947	
The Dreamer	Singer	William Forest Crouch	1948	

Television
Title	Episode	Role	Director Producer	Year	Notes #
The Saturday Show	Episode dated 10 September 1955	Herself	Richard Afton (Producer)	1955	
