= O'Daniel =

O'Daniel may refer to:

- Dorian O'Daniel (born 1994), American football linebacker
- Ed O'Daniel (born 1938), American politician in the state of Kentucky
- John W. O'Daniel (1894–1975), aka "Iron Mike", a senior United States Army officer in World War I, World War II and the Korean War
- Nicky O'Daniel, American actress on stage and screen
- W. Lee O'Daniel, aka "Pappy" O'Daniel (1890–1969), American Democratic Party politician from Texas and radio host
- William L. O'Daniel (1923–2017), American farmer and politician

== See also ==
- W. Lee O'Daniel (and the Light Crust Dough Boys)", a song written by James Talley and originally recorded by Johnny Cash
- Pat O'Daniel and His Hillbilly Boys, Texan Western swing band with its own radio program during the mid-1930s
- Daniel (disambiguation)
