= Ruby Hill (singer) =

American singer

Poster for Ebony Parade

Ruby Hill Turner (1922 – 2004) was an American singer who starred in the 1946 Broadway production St. Louis Woman. She performed the hit songs "Come Rain or Come Shine" and Any Place I Hang My Hat Is Home for more than 100 showings. Capitol Records recorded her. She featured in the 1947 musical compilation film Ebony Parade made using archival clips. She performed at New York City's Cotton Club and the Ed Sullivan Show.

== Life and career ==
She was born in Danville, Virginia. The young singer, who was reportedly a high school student in Richmond, Virginia before being discovered and cast in the show was fired in a reorganization, but Pearl Bailey led the St Louis Woman cast in a promised strike unless Hill was rehired. After 113 performances, the show closed. She left show business for 5 years, performing in some smaller venues, eventually relating that her management was trying to shape her into a Lena Horne cast. A film adaptation of St. Louis Woman entered into production with Hill reprising her role, but was eventually scrapped.

A different account of her life describes her moving to New York City in 1939 and marrying.

The slight young singer was married to Robert Turner.

== See also ==
- Cotton Club Boys (chorus line)
