= Phil Gomez =

American musician (1917–1992)

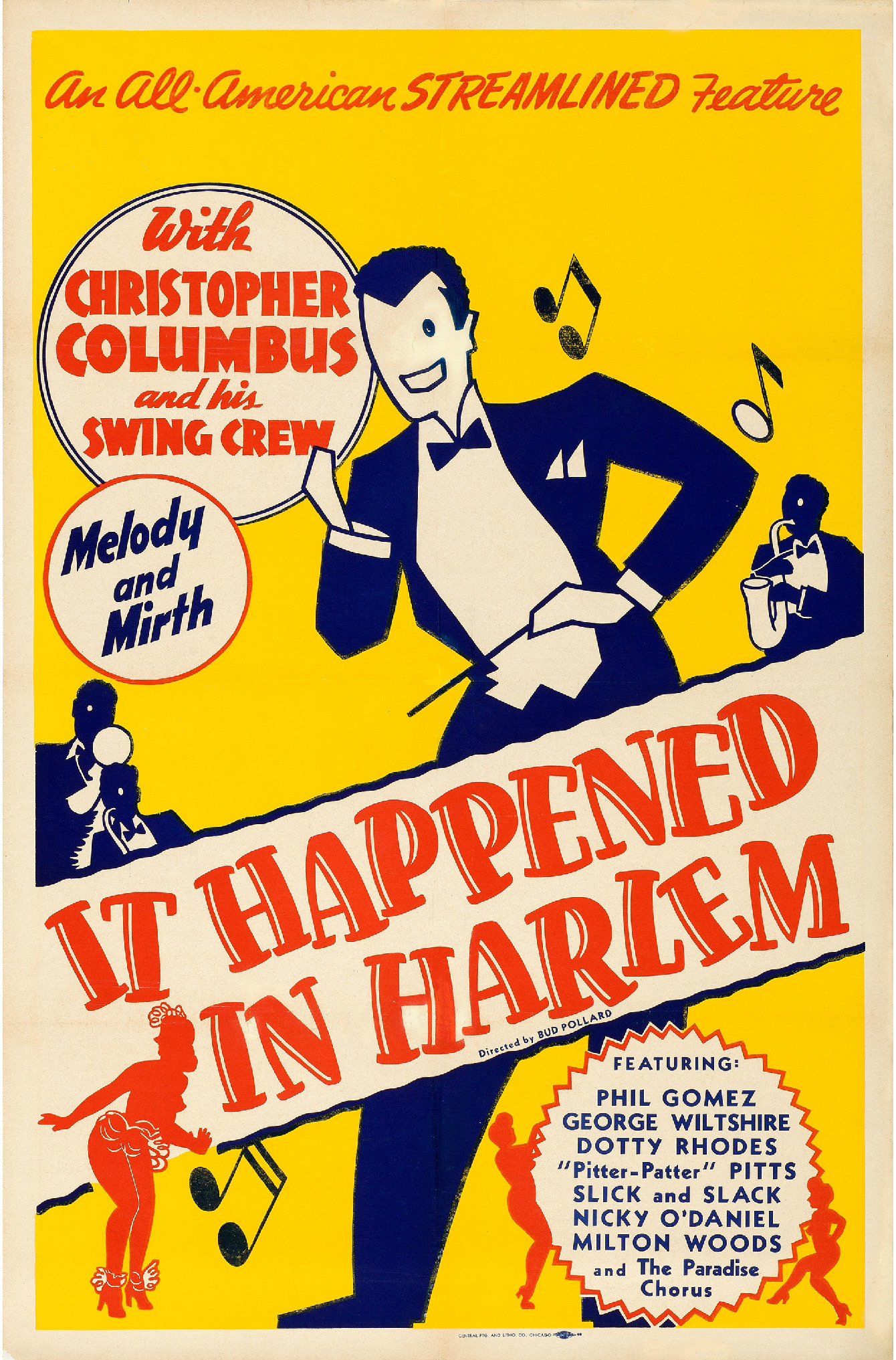
Advertisement for It Happened in Harlem

Phillip Kinteros Gomez (August 24, 1917 – August 14, 1992) was an American musician who played the clarinet. He appeared in the 1945 film It Happened in Harlem. Gomez served in the U.S. Army during World War II. His record lists Sonny Dunham as his employer at the time. Gomez served He recorded with Muggsy Spanier and his Jazz Band in 1954. He also recorded the song "Quiet Village" as Phil Gomez and his Jazzbos on the album Dixieland Mambo. He also recorded as part of Kid Ory's band and is with him in a 30-minute 1956 film from France. According to AllMusic, he led Phil Gomez's Swinging Kings and brought a Mexican influence to his music. According to IMDb, he plays in Ory's band in the 1956 film, The Benny Goodman Story.

Gomez was born in Mazatlan, Mexico in August 1917, though this is erroneously given in some places as 1919 or 1924.

In 1961 he was living in Los Angeles, California.

Also in 1961, he copyrighted "Dixieland Cha Cha Cha", "Mucho Mambo", and "New Orleans Mambo".

Gomez died in San Bernardino, California in August 1992 at the age of 74.
