= Tommy Smalls =

Disc jockey (1926–1972)

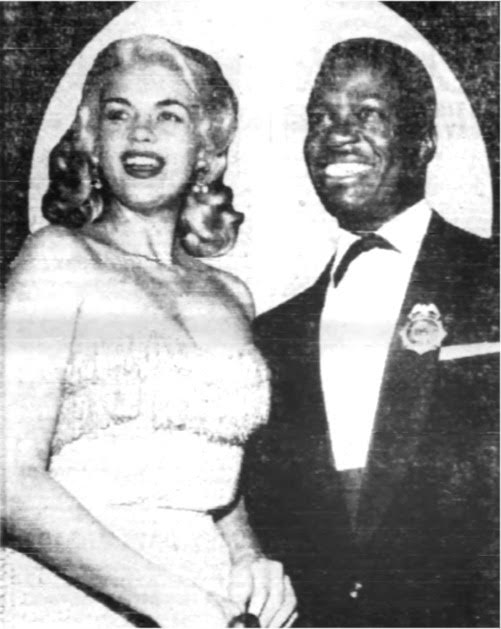
- Smalls with actress Jayne Mansfield, in 1956
- Born: Thomas Smalls; August 5, 1926; Savannah, Georgia, United States
- Died: March 8, 1972 (aged 45); New York City, New York, United States
- Other name: Dr. Jive
- Occupation: Radio disc jockey

Tommy Smalls (August 5, 1926 – March 8, 1972), known as Dr. Jive, was an influential African-American radio disc jockey in New York City during the early days of rock and roll. He owned the Smalls Paradise club in Harlem in the 1950s.

== Life and career ==
Born Thomas Smalls in Savannah, Georgia, he attended Savannah State College, and, after a period in the US Coast Guard, became the first black disc jockey in Savannah in 1947 on radio station WSAV. In 1952 he moved to New York, and became the original "Dr. Jive" on radio station WWRL. His weekday afternoon radio shows—with the slogan "Sit back and relax and enjoy the wax / From three-oh-five to five-three-oh, it's the Dr. Jive show"—became popular with teenagers and featured vocal groups, blues, rock and roll and Latin music.

In 1955, he began to present live rhythm and blues revues from the Rockland Palace and the Apollo Theater, and in November 1955 presented an unprecedented 12-minute segment on the nationally-networked The Ed Sullivan Show featuring Bo Diddley, LaVern Baker, the Five Keys, and Willis "Gator Tail" Jackson. By the end of 1955, he had purchased the Smalls Paradise club in Harlem, and in May 1956 he was elected to the unofficial post of "Mayor of Harlem", with a parade held through the town in his honor. In 1960, he appeared (uncredited) on the Bobby Hendricks single "Psycho" as the voice of the psychiatrist.

In the late 1950s, he married teen model Dolores De Vega, who years later in 2009, appeared on the TV Land series, "She's Got the Look." Their first child, a daughter, Sharon, born in July, 1950 from a previous marriage. Then in November 1955, Tommy Smalls and Dolores DeVega had another daughter, Laura. Soon following was Shawn-nee in June 1957 and finally their son, Tommy Smalls, Jr., in September 1959.

In 1960, Smalls, along with fellow disc jockey Alan Freed, was arrested and charged in the "payola" scandal, when both were accused of taking bribes to play records on their radio shows, and his radio career ended. He later became promotions manager for Polydor Records in New York. He was also one of the founding members of the National Association of TV and Radio Announcers (NATRA).

He died after a long illness in New York City on March 8, 1972, aged 45.
