= June Richmond =

American jazz singer and actor

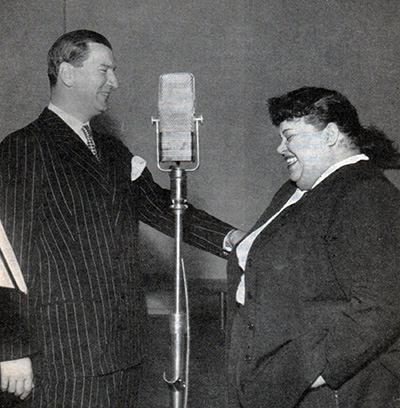
- June Richmond on Swedish National Radio

Background information
- Born: July 9, 1915; Chicago, Illinois, U.S.
- Died: August 14, 1962 (aged 47) Gothenburg, Sweden
- Genres: Jazz
- Occupations: Singer, actress

June Richmond (July 9, 1915 in Chicago, Illinois – August 14, 1962 in Gothenburg, Sweden) was an American jazz singer and actor.

June Richmond is considered the first African-American jazz singer who sang regularly in a white band when she appeared in 1938, with Jimmy Dorsey's Orchestra, with whom she recorded several sides for Decca Records. After she left Andy Kirk, she launched a successful career as a soloist; in 1946, she had a featured role in the Broadway musical Are You With It?

Her first recordings under her own name originated in 1945 when she signed with Mercury Records, releasing several singles, including two songs from her Broadway musical "Are You With It?" She also recorded a series of 45 EP albums for the Odeon, Barclay and Varga labels and a 10" LP of eight songs from Porgy and Bess sung in French.

== Films ==
She appeared in several films in the 1940s and 1950s, including Murder in Swingtime (1937), Carolina Blues (1944), Reet, Petite, and Gone (1947), The Dreamer (1948), Tour of the Grand Dukes (France, 1953), and Liebe, Jazz und Übermut (Germany, 1957).

June Richmond died in 1962 at the age of 47. A comprehensive two-disc CD collection, Hey, Lawdy Mama! was released in 2022 by Jasmine Records.

== Discography ==
- Cab Calloway, 1938-1939 (Classics)
- Andy Kirk, 1939-1940, 1943-1949 (Classics)
- Harold Nicholas, June Richmond, Andy Bey, Jazz in Paris (Gitanes/Universal, 2000)
- June Richmond--Hey Lawdy Mama! Rare Recordings 1938-1961 (Jasmine)
- June Richmond Chante en Francais (Ild)
- June Richmond Chante en Anglais (Ild)
- June Richmond Chante Porgy and Bess en Francais (Odeon)
- Andy Kirk and June Richmond, New Orleans Jump (Sounds of Yesteryear)
