= Germaine Ingram =

American lawyer and choreographer

Germaine Ingram is an American lawyer, dancer, and choreographer. She was also the first Black woman to be appointed as a full-time faculty member at Temple University School of Law in Philadelphia in 1972. Prior to earning the title of assistant professor, Ingram served as a law clerk in Pennsylvania's Supreme Court for Judge Theodore Spaulding. Furthermore, she was the recipient of the Rocky Award from DanceUSA in 2011 and the Tap Preservation Award in 2016, among many others.

== Early life ==
Ingram is a graduate of Syracuse University and the University of Pennsylvania Law School where she also worked as a research assistant for the Voluntary Defender Association and participated in the Law Students Civil Rights Research Council. She also completed post-graduate work at Harvard University as a Fellow in Law and Humanities. Following her graduation, Ingram worked as an attorney for thirty years; she focused on laws and advocacy work in the areas of child welfare, education reform, and the arts. As a practicing attorney, Ingram defended discrimination class action suits and fought for gender and minority equality in the workplace. In 1994, Ingram served as chief of staff for Philadelphia Superintendent David Hornbeck. While working for the Philadelphia School District, Ingram led the effort to ensure that poorer districts receive fair and proper funding.

In her early thirties, Ingram developed an interest in tap dancing. LaVaughan Robinson mentored Ingram. In recalling her earliest memories of working with Robinson, Ingram says simply, "It was all hard." Robinson, according to Ingram, danced without music, which was challenging for Ingram. Two of her major artistic works include "Stepping in Time" and "Plenty of Good Women." Described as a "revue of fabulous Philadelphia artists," "Stepping in Time" featured professional African American tap dancers from the 1930s, 40s, and 50s. The show opened at the Arts Bank in Philadelphia on February 4–5, 1995. Ingram was the show's project director, organizer, executor, and performer. Her other major work "Plenty of Good Women Dancers" (1996) was inspired by brave Black female dancers from the Swing Era following the Harlem Renaissance.

== Career ==
=== Career in Law ===
Ingram graduated from the University of Pennsylvania School of Law in 1971. She then served as a law clerk in Pennsylvania's Supreme Court for Judge Theodore Spaulding. In 1972, she became the first Black woman to be appointed as a full-time faculty member at Temple University School of Law in Philadelphia. Ingram's law practice, which spanned thirty years from 1971 to 2001, focused on child welfare, education reform, arts, and equality in the workplace. As an attorney, she defended discrimination class action suits and fought for gender and minority equality in the workplace. In 1994, using her background in law, Ingram worked as chief of staff for Philadelphia's public school system. In this position, she prioritized the allocation of proper and fair funding to poorer districts.

=== Career in Dance & the Arts ===
In 1980 at the age of 33, Ingram put her law career on hold, and under the mentorship of LaVaughn Robinson, she pursued dancing. As her teacher, Robinson encouraged Ingram to find her own voice and to use her whole body. In 1984, Ingram performed with Robinson at the Smithsonian Folklife Festival. By 1985, she was performing on stages and in festivals across the country, and in 1989, Ingram was featured on an Emmy Award-winning PBS television special called Tap Dance in America.

In the early 1990s, Ingram began working on an oral history project under with the Philadelphia Folklore Project. This project evolved into a stage production called "Stepping in Time"—which celebrated the careers of Black artists dating back to the 1920s-1950s. In 1996, Ingram helped create and release of the documentary Plenty Of Good Women Dancers: African American Women Hoofers from Philadelphia, which is about Black female dancers who secured a spot in the world of tap despite restrictions, limited roles, and lack of recognition. Ingram became a choreographer commissioned by Manhattan Tap and Tappers with Attitude, a Washington DC company. She partnered with Robinson for 25 years.

In 2005, she published an article titled "Chronicling Resistance Fellow" about the contributions of performer Louise Madison who challenged gender norms in dance by outdancing her male peers, wearing male dance attire, and raising questions about her sexual orientation. In 2010, she also co-wrote "Parallel Destinies", a reflection on George Washington's ownership of enslaved African Americans and the quarters in which he housed them near the Liberty Bell.

In 2012–13, Ingram was commissioned to create a performance about the African Methodist Episcopal Church in Philadelphia. In 2014, she collaborated with violist Diane Monroe on a project called "Freedom Underfoot," which commemorated the Battle of Atlanta. Later that same year, Ingram served as a resident fellow at the Sacatar Institute in Itaparica, Bahia, Brazil.

== Awards and civic engagement ==
- Board member for the Leeway Foundation and Arts Nova Workshop
- Member of the Public Art Committee of the Philadelphia Redevelopment Authority's 1% for Art program
- Member of Brandeis University International Advisory Board for the International Center for Ethics, Justice, and Public Life
- Member of the Leadership Circle for IMPACT, an initiative based in Brandeis University to support the arts
- 2010: Recipient of the Pew Fellowship in the Arts, which is awarded to exceptional artists in the Philadelphia area
- 2012: Recipient of the Philadelphia Folklore Project's Award for Folk Arts & Cultural Heritage Practice
- 2012: Recipient of the Arts & Change Award, given by Leeway Foundation
