= Louise Madison =

American tap dancer

- Born: 1911; Philadelphia, Pennsylvania, U.S.
- Died: 1970 (aged 58–59)
- Occupation: Tap dancer

Louise Madison (1911–1970) was an American tap dancer. Little about her life and career are known. She was born and raised in Philadelphia, and frequently praised by other tap dancers of her time, who described her tap style as "like a man". She often performed in nontraditional clothing for a female tap dancer at the time, such as low-heeled shoes and "white tails".

Madison performed at the Apollo Theater in New York City from 1933 to 1934 in the first run of the musical Blackbirds of 1933 and during the late 1940s alongside tap dancer LaVaughn Robinson; she also performed in the revival of Blackbirds of 1933 in London.

== Early life and career ==
Louise Madison was born in 1911 in Philadelphia, Pennsylvania, and was raised in North Philadelphia. Little is known of her tap career outside of testimonies from fellow tap dancers, and no known footage of her on film or on video exists. According to fellow Philadelphia tap dancer LaVaughn Robinson, she regularly danced in "white tails", a top hat, low-heeled shoes, and white pants. Madison's self-assurance as a solo dancer, attire, and tap style, which was light and quick and which tap dancer Charles "Honi" Coles and tap historians Jean and Marshall Stearns described as "like a man", were unconventional for her time. Madison also taught Coles his first five-tap wing.

She performed in the first run of Blackbirds of 1933 at the Apollo Theater in New York City from 1933 to 1934, where she danced in the musical number "Tappin' the Barrel"; she was later featured in the London production of the same show. Throughout the 1930s and 1940s, Madison performed in theatre and club circuits, and she performed with Robinson at the Apollo Theater in the late 1940s. It is unknown when or why she retired from tap. She died in 1970.

== Personal life and legacy ==
Many suspected that Madison was a lesbian. Fellow tap dancers such as Robinson and Jewel "Pepper" Welch praised her as being better than any tap dancer of her time, male or female. Tap dancer Ayodele Casel listed Madison as one of the "many many... Black women tap dancers from the 1920s and 50s whose stories have been lost to history" and as "one of the progenitors of [the] art" of tap dancing. Germaine Ingram, an American choreographer and attorney, surmised that Madison's lack of success compared to her peers may have been related to her darker skin and facial features as well as her challenging of gender norms.
