= Reet, Petite, and Gone =

- Directed by: William Forest Crouch
- Written by: William Forest Crouch (story, as William Forest); Irwin Winehouse (screenplay)
- Produced by: Berle Adams (executive producer); William Forest Crouch (producer); Robert M. Savini (executive producer)
- Starring: See below
- Cinematography: Don Malkames
- Edited by: Leonard Anderson
- Distributed by: Astor Pictures
- Release date: September 1947
- Running time: 67 minutes
- Country: United States
- Language: English

Reet, Petite, and Gone is a 1947 American musical race film produced and released by Astor Pictures. It was the second of three feature films produced and directed by short-subject director William Forest Crouch starring singer and bandleader Louis Jordan.

== Plot ==
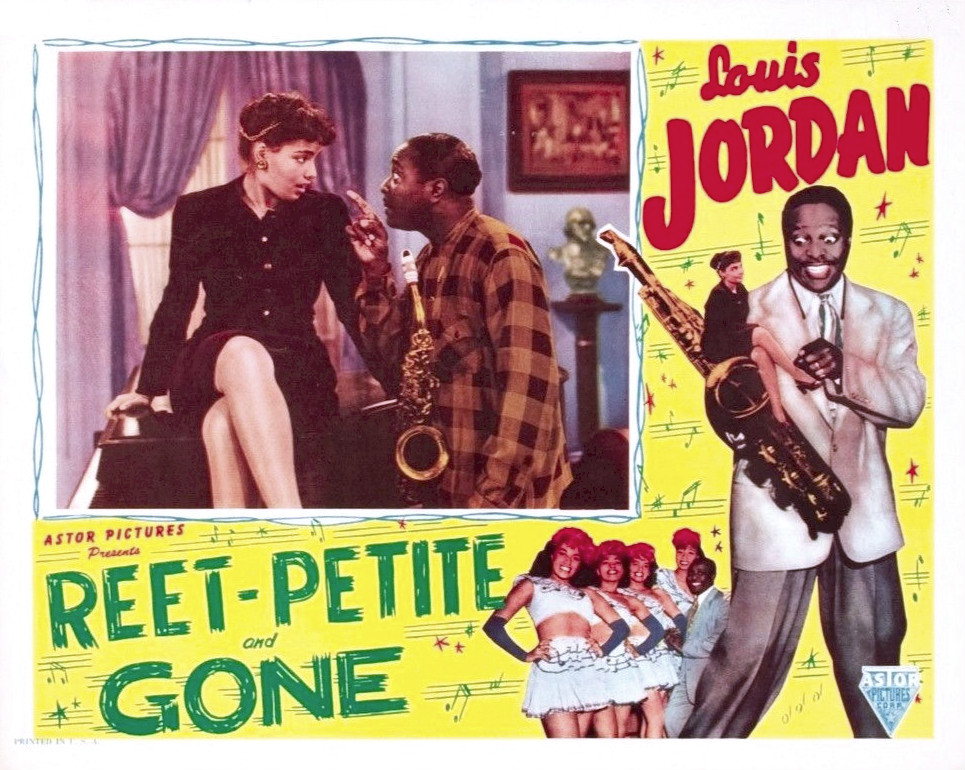
Lobby card

Louis Jarvis Jr. is summoned from his band's radio show to visit his terminally ill father before his father dies. Honey Carter, the daughter of the only woman whom Jarvis Sr. had ever loved, also visits. Jarvis Sr.'s dying wish is that his son marries Honey. He before meeting his son and Honey.

Jarvis Sr.'s shady lawyer Henry Talbot sees a chance to secure a portion of the Jarvis estate for himself by rewriting the will to read that Jarvis Jr. must marry a woman like Talbot's secretary Rusty. Talbot wants to conspire with Rusty to marry and then divorce Jarvis Jr. so that she and Henry will split the estate. Jarvis Jr. is fooled by Talbot's ruse and believes that he must marry soon to avoid the distribution of the estate to charity.

Jarvis Jr. urgently needs the estate money to produce his new stage musical. He does not wish to marry Rusty, but his friend suggests that they cast the show with a lead actress who resembles Rusty. However, Talbot attempts to stop the show by scaring Junior's investors.

== Production ==
Producer-director-writer William Forest Crouch had been making Soundies—three-minute movie musicals for coin-operated "movie jukeboxes". His 20-minute musical made for theaters, Caldonia (1945), starred Louis Jordan, and was so successful that Crouch signed Jordan for three feature films. Reet, Petite, and Gone was the second.

Crouch made his films on low budgets with fast-paced, assembly-line methods at the former Edison studio in New York City. Scenes were rarely photographed more than twice—once for long shots and once for close-ups—and if the actors couldn't remember the scripted dialogue, they said something appropriate anyway, knowing that the schedule didn't call for repeated takes. Most Hollywood "B" features were shot in five to ten days, but Crouch filmed this feature in only a day and a half.

== Cast ==
- Louis Jordan as Schyler Jarvis / Louis Jarvis
- June Richmond as June
- Milton Woods as Sam Adams
- Bea Griffith as Honey Carter / Lovey Linn
- David Bethea as Dolph the butler
- Lorenzo Tucker as Henry Talbot
- Vanita Smythe as Rusty
- Mable Lee as Mabel
- Dots Johnson as Michaels
- Pat Rainey as Pat Rains
- Rudy Toombs as Hal
- J. Louis Johnson as Schyler Jarvis Sr.
- Joe Lillard as Lt. Jerome

== Soundtrack ==
- Louis Jordan with His Tympany Five — "Texas and Pacific" (by Jack Wolf Fine)
- Louis Jordan with His Tympany Five — "All for the Love of Lil"
- Bea Griffith and Louis Jordan — "Tonight, Be Tender to Me"
- Pat Rainey, Mabel Lee with Louis Jordan and His Tympany Five — "The Blues Ain't Nothin'" (written by Ida Cox)
- Louis Jordan with His Tympany Five — "The Green Grass Grew all Around" (by William Jerome, arrangement by Louis Jordan)
- June Richmond — "I've Changed Completely"
- Louis Jordan with His Tympany Five — "Wham, Sam! (Dig Them Gams)" (written by Louis Jordan)
- Louis Jordan with His Tympany Five — "I Know What You're Puttin' Down" (written by Louis Jordan)
- Louis Jordan with His Tympany Five — "Let the Good Times Roll" (written by Spo-De-Odee and Fleecie Moore)
- Louis Jordan with His Tympany Five — "Reet, Petite, and Gone" (written by Louis Jordan)
- June Richmond and Louis Jordan with His Tympany Five — "You Got Me Where You Want Me" (writer unknown)
- Jordan with chorus girls — "That Chick's Too Young to Fry" (written by Tommy Edwards and Jimmy Hilliard)
- Louis Jordan — "Ain't That Just Like a Woman?" (written by Fleecie Moore and Claude Demetri)
- Louis Jordan with Bea Griffith — "If It's Love You Want, Baby, That's Me" (written by Sid Robin)

== See also ==
- "Reet Petite", about the song
