= Richard Huey =

American actor

Richard Huey (died 1948) was an actor in the United States who performed on stage, radio, and in films. He also owned a cafe and did a stint as a disc jockey.

He was born in Louisiana and grew up mostly in Los Angeles. He led a theater group in New York City's Harlem neighborhood. The group was called the Ruchard Huey Players. Huey owned Aunt Dinah's Kotchen on 135th Street.

He featured in the comedy Three Men on a Horse. He died in November 1948 at the age of 46.

== Theater ==
- Porgy (1927–1939)
- Solid South (1930) as Elijah
- Five Star Final (1930–1931)
- Wild Waves (1932)
- Three Men on a Horse (1935–1937, 1942) as Moses
- Brown Sugar (1937)
- Sing Out the News (1938–1939)
- Sunny River (1941–1942)
- Bloomer Girl (1944–1946) as Alexander

== Filmography ==
- Chloe, Love Is Calling You (1934)
- Caldonia (1945)
