= Dardanelle Breckenbridge =

American singer-songwriter

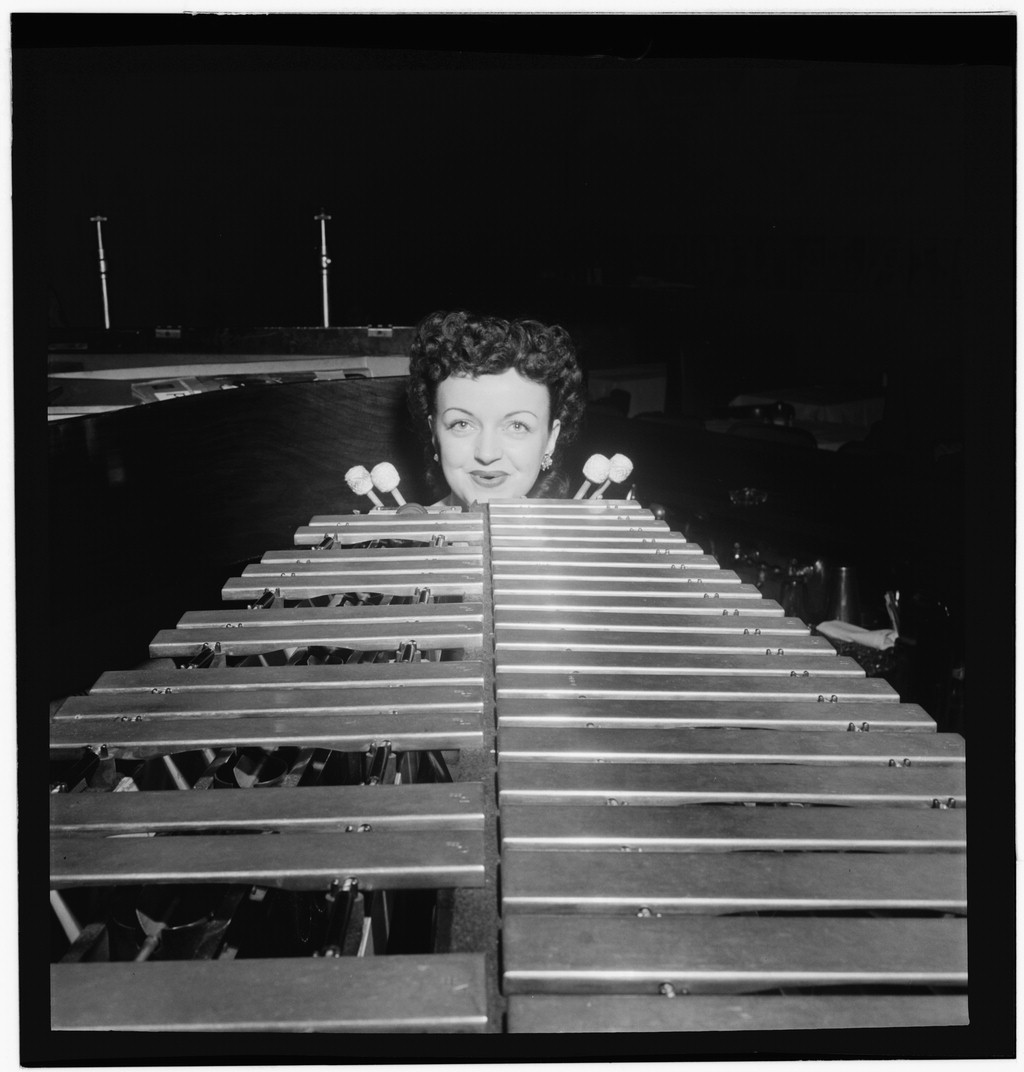
- Portrait of Dardanelle in Washington, D.C., by William P. Gottlieb

Background information
- Also known as: "Dardanelle", Dardanelle Breckenridge", "Dardanelle Hadley"
- Born: Marcia Marie Mullen; December 27, 1917; Avalon, Mississippi, USA
- Died: August 8, 1997 (aged 79) Memphis, Tennessee, USA
- Genres: Jazz
- Occupations: Singer, Songwriter, Jazz musician
- Instruments: Piano, vibraphone, vocals
- Labels: RCA Victor, Stash, Audiophile,

Dardanelle Breckenbridge or Breckenridge (December 27, 1917 – August 8, 1997), was an American jazz musician known for performing with Lionel Hampton in the 1940s, and later as a solo artist under the name Dardanelle.

== Biography ==
Dardanelle was a pianist, vibraphonist, and singer who was raised in a musical family. She studied music at Louisiana State University, holding a major, and worked as a house pianist at a local radio station. By the late 1930s she started to appear professionally on the national jazz scene. During the 1940s she led her own Dardanelle Trio, with various collaborators, initially with bassist Paul Edenfield and guitarist Tal Farlow. The trio recorded music and became a regular fixture at New York's Copacabana. During this time she was featured in the 1946 short theatrical musical Soundies Presents Happy Cat directed by William Forest Crouch and distributed by RCA Records. By the 1950s, Dardanelle had moved to Chicago and paused music in favour of raising a family.

Dardanelle had reappeared on the jazz scene by the 1970s. She relocated to the East Coast and formed a new trio including her son, the drummer Skip Hadley. Now she worked with the likes of Bucky Pizzarelli and George Duvivier, contributing on records, and appearing in a number of venues including the Carnegie Hall, until the 1990s.

== Discography (in selection) ==
=== Solo albums ===
- 1950: Piano Moods (Columbia records)
- 1978: Songs For New Lovers (Stash Records), with Bucky Pizzarelli, George Duvivier, Grady Tate
- 1981: Echoes Singing Ladies (Audiophile)
- 1982: The Colors Of My Life (Stash Records)
- 1984: The Two Of Us (Stash Records), with Vivian Lord
- 1987: A Woman's Intuition (Audiophile)

=== Collaborations ===
With Lionel Hampton and his Orchestra

- 1946: Punch And Judy (Decca records)
- 1953: Hamp's Boogie Woogie (Brunswick)
- 1963: Volume 2 - October 16, 1944 – January 30, 1946 (Ajazz Records)
- 1983: Leapin' With Lionel (Affinity)
- 1983 Gold Braid (Audiophile) – A compilation of 'The Dardanelle Trio' 1945 World Broadcasting recordings.
