= It Happened in Harlem =

1945 film by Bud Pollard

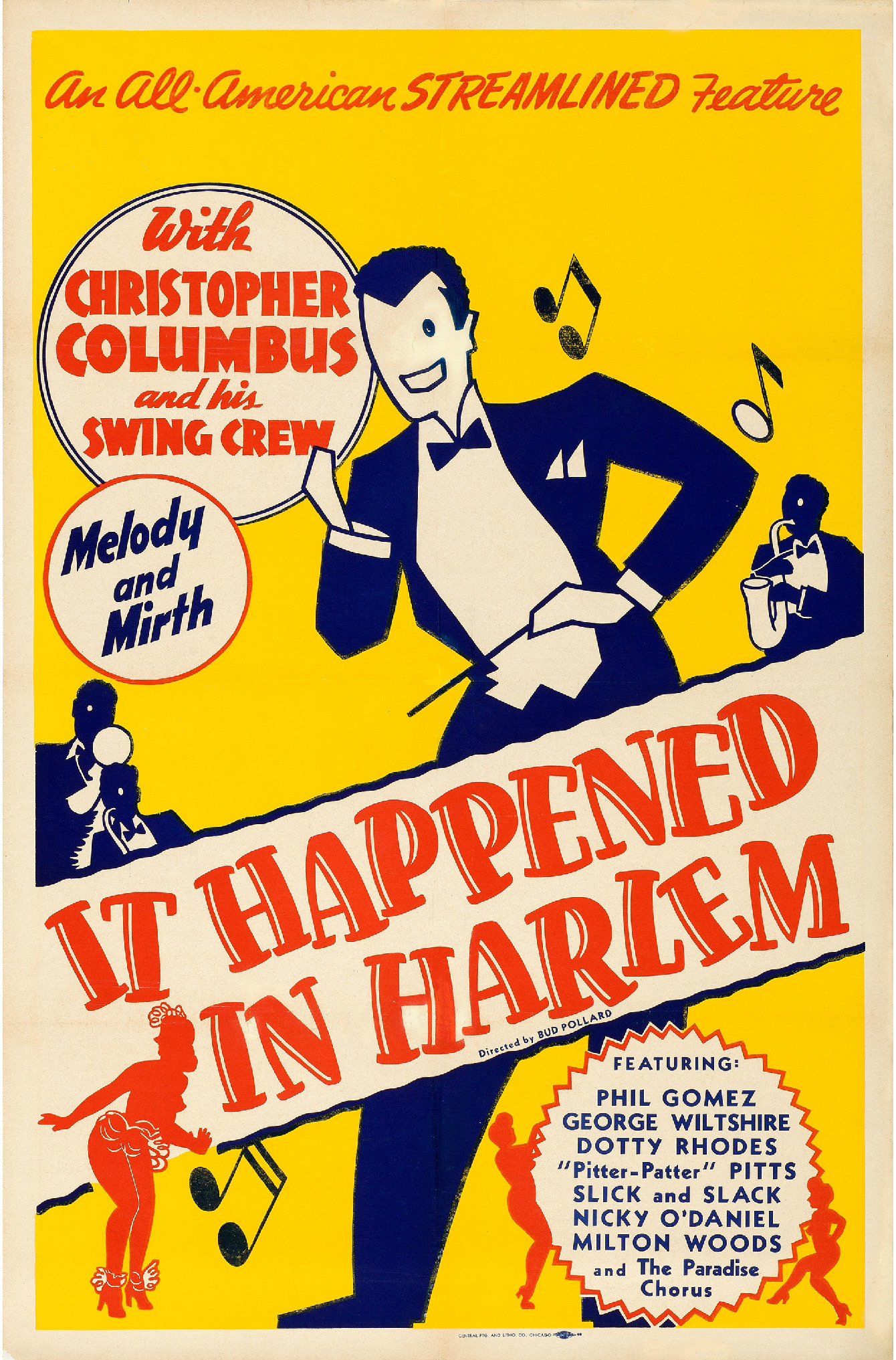
- Theatrical release poster
- Directed by: Bud Pollard
- Written by: Bud Pollard
- Starring: Chris Columbus; Phil Gomez; Nicky O'Daniel
- Production company: All-American News
- Distributed by: All-American News
- Release date: 1945
- Running time: 30 Minutes
- Country: United States

It Happened in Harlem is an American musical comedy film directed by Bud Pollard and starring Chris Columbus, Phil Gomez, and Nicky O'Daniel. The film was partly shot at Smalls Paradise and released in 1945. However, no prints of the film are held in any archives and is presumed lost.

The film includes performances by various musical acts including Dotty Rhodes and "Pitter-Patter" Pitts (Juanita Pitts). Rhodes was a dancer at the Cotton Club. Pitts was a female tap dancer who dressed and danced like a man.

The 30-minute film relies on a thin plot to showcase various performers. Stills and advertising for the film survive.

== Plot ==
A very popular singer is drawing large crowds to his Smalls Paradise performances when he receives his draft notice. Ed Smalls then begins the task of auditioning someone to replace him. A somewhat unknown young singer with a loyal following tries to audition for the job but is not considered. One of his very loyal fans goes to Smalls to convince the owner to give the young man a chance.

== Cast ==
- Christopher Columbus
- Phil Gomez as Frankie, the soda jerk
- Nicky O'Daniel as Little Miss Brown
- Juanita 'Pitter-Patter' Pitts as "Pitter-Patter" Pitts
- Dotty Rhodes as self
- Slick and Slack as self
- Milton Woods as Billy Bond
- George Wiltshire as Ed Smalls of Smalls Paradise
- The Paradise Chorus
