= George Wiltshire =

American actor (1896–1976)

George Wiltshire (also known as George Wilshire, born October 21, 1896 – died December 4, 1976) was an American character actor. He appeared on stage, film, and television. He was perhaps best known for portraying Ed Smalls, the proprietor of famed Harlem nightclub Smalls Paradise, in the 1945 film It Happened in Harlem.

== Filmography ==
- Keep Punching (1939) as Jack Hemingway
- It Happened in Harlem (1945) as Ed Smalls
- Caldonia (1945) as George, a creditor
- Midnight Menace (1946)
- Fight That Ghost (1946) as Lawyer Smith
- Hi De Ho (1947) as Boss Mason
- Killer Diller (1948) as Mortimer Dumdone
- Junction 88 (1948) as Rev. Juniper
- A French Peep Show (1950)
- Sweet Love, Bitter (1967) as George Wilshire

== TV series ==
- N.Y.P.D. (1968) as Mr Daggett (in "Which side are you on?")
- Grady (mini series, 1975) as Elroy Pitt (in "Be it ever so humble")
- Sanford and Son (two episodes in 1976) as Elroy Pitt
