= Caldonia (film) =

1945 American film

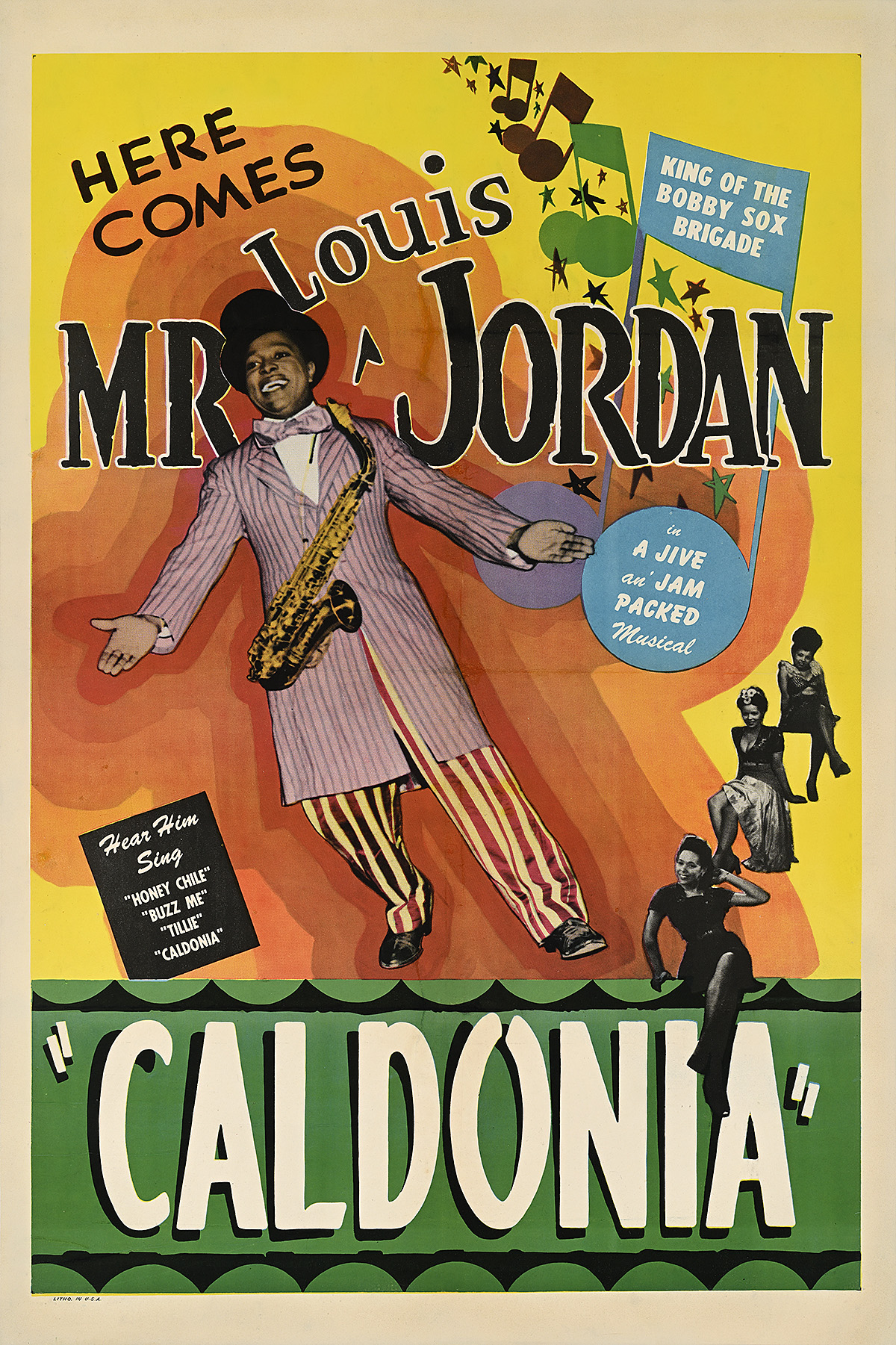
- Poster for original theatrical release
- Directed by: William Forest Crouch
- Screenplay by: John A. McGee
- Produced by: Berle Adams
- Starring: Louis Jordan
- Edited by: Leonard Weiss
- Distributed by: Astor Pictures
- Release date: August 1, 1945
- Running time: 18 minutes

Caldonia is a two reel American musical short film directed by William Forest Crouch and released by Astor Pictures in 1945. The film stars musician Louis Jordan and was produced by his manager Berle Adams. The film includes four songs performed by Jordan and his band: "Caldonia", "Honey Child", "Tillie" and "Buzz Me", which were also released individually by the Soundies Distributing Corporation of America.

In 2008, a poster for the film was included on a U.S. postage stamp in a set of five celebrating Vintage Black Cinema.

== Synopsis ==
Caldonia (1945)

Louis Jordan and his band are on the way to Hollywood to make a film, but producer Richard Huey (Felix Paradise) and Jordan's girlfriend Caldonia (Nicky O'Daniel) convince him to remain in Harlem, promising that he'll have a great movie career. The shoot gets foreclosed and Jordan loses his Hollywood contract as well as his girlfriend.

== Production ==
The film was financed by Broadcast Music Incorporated (BMI) and cost "approximately $3,000 to produce". It was filmed in the winter of 1944 in New York.

== Reception ==
The success of the Caldonia gave Jordan's film career a boost, leading to other film roles. Billboard (June 8, 1946) noted:

Louis Jordan's use of the film short, Caldonia, as an exploitation medium, differs from most ork promotional stunts in that it is in itself a direct source of revenue… So successful is Caldonia, and so promising the forthcoming 60-minute feature Beware, that Jordan's manager, Berle Adams, has arranged for the leader to make two features a year for Astor Pictures. The Astor trick, which sets Jordan's flickers apart from the usual run of band shorts and features, is in its distribution. Astor has its own distrib set up… and can plant the Jordan movie directly ahead of him in practically every town he plays.

The stamp issued in 2008 was part of a Postal Service tribute to Vintage Black Cinema. "Vivid reminders of a bygone era stamps issued in that series were based on five vintage movie posters. Whether spotlighting the talents of entertainment icons or documenting changing social attitudes and expectations, these posters now serve a greater purpose than publicity and promotion. They are invaluable pieces of history, preserving memories of cultural phenomena that otherwise might have been forgotten."

== Cast ==
Although Cab Calloway, Doc Cheatham, Milt Hinton, Ben Webster have credited appearances according to some sources such as IMDb, they do not appear in the film.

The cast includes:

- Louis Jordan & His Tympany Five:
  - Louis Jordan, alto and tenor sax, vocal and bandleader
  - Eddie Roane, trumpet
  - William Austin, piano
  - Al Morgan, string bass
  - Alex "Razz" Mitchell, drums
- Nicky O'Daniel (Caldonia)
- Richard Huey (Felix Paradise)
- Sam "Spo-De-O-De" Theard
- George Wiltshire
- Roxie Joynes (Performer)
- Raymond Kaalund (Tap dancer)
- Taylor & Harris (Dance team)
- The Three Sun Tan Girls (Singers)
- Joan Clark (Josie)
