= Nicky O'Daniel =

American actress

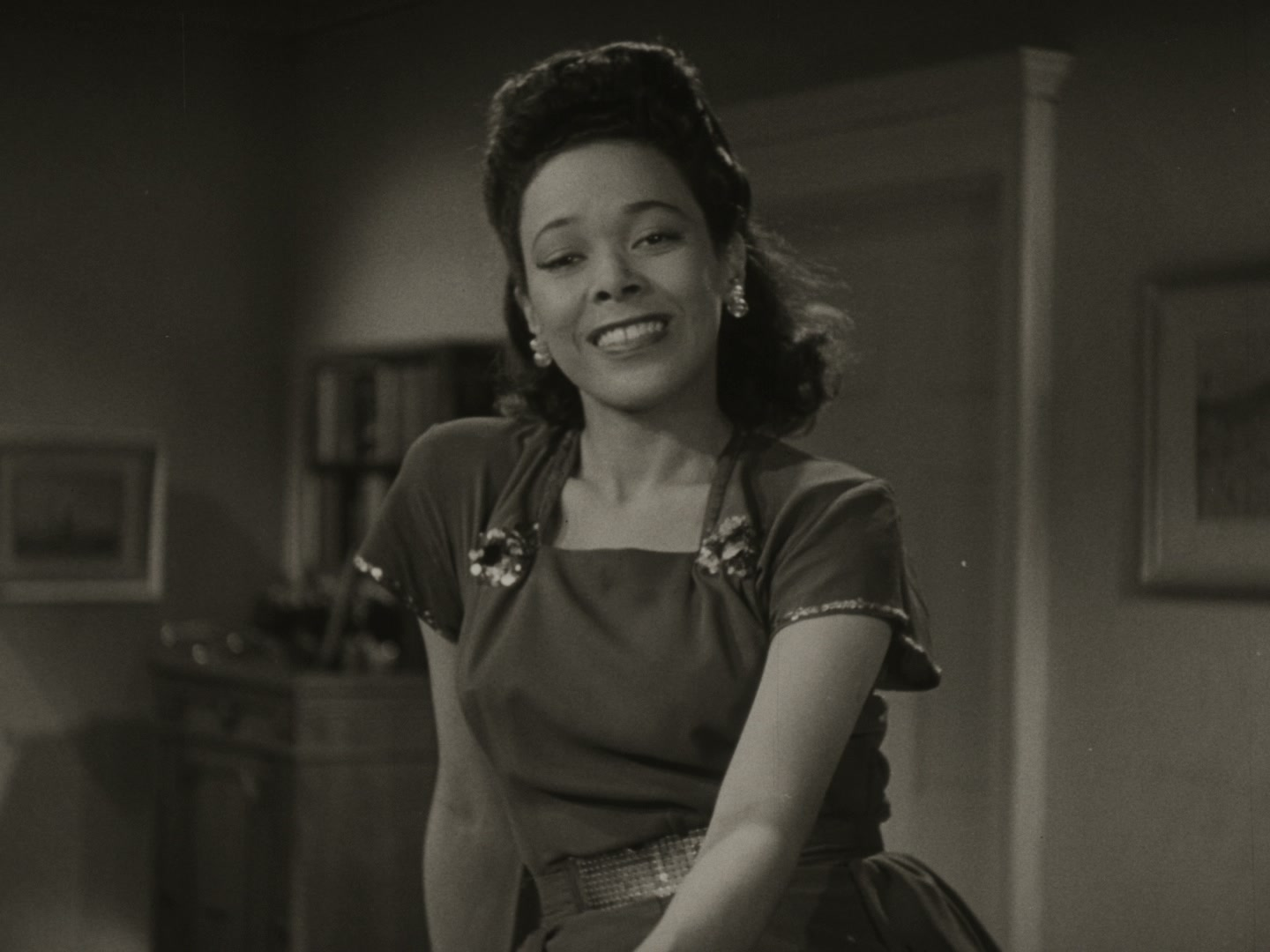
Nicky O'Daniel in Caldonia (1945)

Nicky O'Daniel was an American actress on stage and screen. In the short film Caldonia she portrays the title character, a possessive girlfriend who convinces her man not to go to Hollywood for a film production but to stay New York City. She was one of the performers featured in the 1945 short film It Happened in Harlem. A soundie titled The Pollard Jump (1946) includes her dancing.

== Theater ==
- Early to Bed

== Filmography ==
- It Happened in Harlem (1945)
- Caldonia (1945)
- Swingtime Jamboree (1946)
- Rhythm in a Riff (1947)
- Harlem After Midnight (1947) as dancer. Edited from Rhythm in a Riff
- The Pollard Jump, a soundie
