= William Forest Crouch =

American film director

William Forest Crouch (January 16, 1904 – March 1968) was an American motion picture producer, director, writer, and film editor of the 1940s. He is best known for his Soundies musicals filmed for coin-operated movie jukeboxes, and for a few musical features with all-African-American casts, such as Reet, Petite, and Gone (1947).

Crouch was born in Boone, Iowa, and as a young man he became interested in the motion picture industry. He was a reporter and reviewer for Motion Picture News and Motion Picture Herald in Chicago (as Bill Crouch) and continued working in the trade press until 1940, when he became the executive secretary of the United Theatre Owners of Illinois.

== Soundies ==
The coin-operated Soundies jukeboxes were manufactured by the Mills Novelty Company of Chicago. Trade reporter Bill Crouch, already based in Chicago, was an obvious choice to publicize the Soundies films. In 1942, when Mills Novelty established its own production facility in Chicago, Crouch seized an opportunity to produce Soundies musicals himself. Crouch named his production company with his initials (W. F. C. Productions), but soon renamed it Filmcraft Productions. In 1944 he moved to Soundies’ New York facility, which was originally silent-film pioneer Thomas A. Edison’s studio on Decatur Avenue in the Bronx.

William Forest Crouch became the most prolific of the Soundies producers, using a fast-paced approach. He made his films as inexpensively as possible, hiring lesser-known talent at lower fees while saving his budgets for big-name performers. He used the same assembly-line tricks again and again: frequent cheesecake shots of young women, eccentric camera angles, special-lens compositions that divided the screen into multiple images, and editorial gimmicks like showing the action in reverse motion. In fairness to Crouch, the repetition only becomes apparent when one watches several of his Soundies consecutively. The films were originally seen once a week, and not in succession.

Crouch became an ambassador for the Soundies company, driving a company car emblazoned with the “Soundies Musical Movies” logo. He took his film crew to Florida, where he scouted and filmed local talent (including two “Miss Florida” pageant winners, Leona Fredericks and Jeni Freeland).

After World War II Crouch worked hard to keep the Soundies films coming. He even created several non-musical Soundies, featuring exhibition divers, skaters, and sporting events. Crouch stopped making Soundies in 1947, when the parent company abandoned further production.

== Mainstream films for theaters ==
William Forest Crouch entered the world of mainstream movie production in 1944, compiling musical shorts from the Soundies library into 10-minute theatrical shorts. He followed these with musical films starring popular singer and bandleader Louis Jordan. The first film, a short subject titled Caldonia (1945) after Jordan's hit record, was such a success in theaters that Crouch signed Jordan for three feature films: Beware (1946), Reet, Petite and Gone (1947), and Look Out Sister (1948). Reet, Petite and Gone was Crouch's most personal project: he produced it, directed it, and (under the alias William Forest) wrote the original story. Most Hollywood "B" features were produced in five to ten days, but Crouch filmed this 70-minute feature—incredibly—in only a day and a half.

In 1947 Crouch filmed two half-hour musical westerns. Although intended for theaters, Crouch may well have assembled them as half-hour episodes for the new field of commercial television. The two featurettes were Hidden Valley Days and Echo Ranch, both filmed in April 1947 in San Antonio, Texas. Both featured Crouch's Soundies singer "Red River Dave" McEnery, and both were filmed with Crouch's usual thrifty methods "for release by a major company," according to Boxoffice Magazine. Universal Pictures acquired both films and released them to theaters in early 1948. Universal decided to continue the series of novelty featurettes, but without Crouch or McEnery; the studio substituted singer Tex Williams and used its own personnel and facilities in Hollywood.

== Television ==
William Forest Crouch was already prepared for the quick-production demands of the television, and between 1949 and 1952 he made some 200 TV films, ranging from commercials to half-hour programs. In 1952 he became an executive producer for Harold Wondsel's Sound Masters, Inc., making films for both television and industry.

== Filmography ==
- Baby Don't Go Away from Me (1943)
- Cats Can't Dance (1945)
- Caldonia (1945, 20-minute theatrical short)
- Dinty McGinty (1946)
- Back Door Man (1946)
- Happy Cat (1946) - Featuring Dardanelle and Her Boys
- Reet, Petite, and Gone (1947, feature film)
