= Harry Henderson (actor) =

American silent film actor

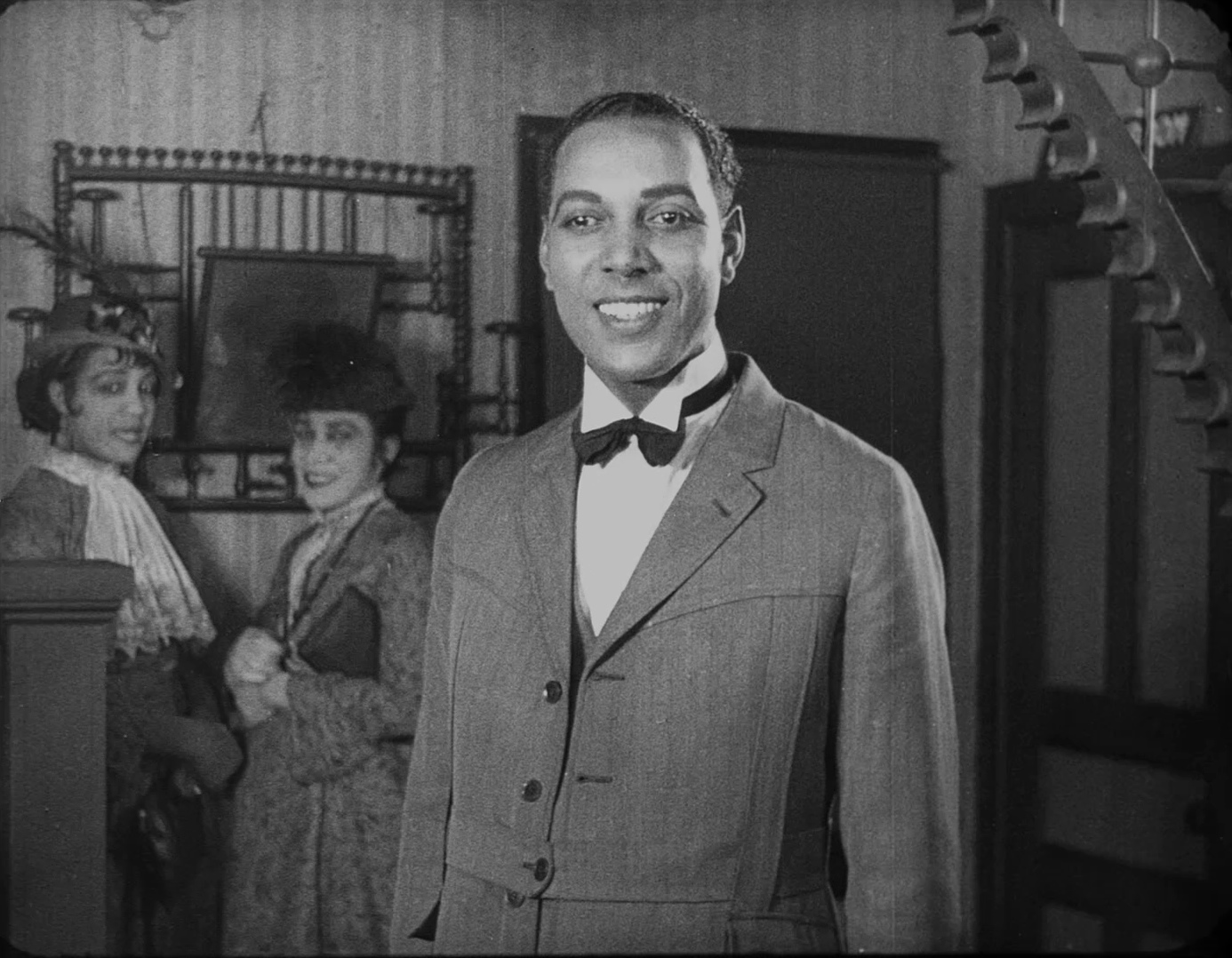
Harry Henderson in Ten Nights in a Barroom (1926)

Harry Henderson was an actor in theater and films in the United States. He made four films with the Colored Players Film Corporation, and was also cast in several Oscar Micheaux films. Henderson had a starring role in the film melodrama The Scar of Shame, portraying a wealthy concert pianist in the film. He also had a lead role in the 1926 film The Prince of His Race.

== Filmography ==
- Uncle Jasper's Will (1922)
- The Dungeon (1922)
- The Ghost of Tolston's Manor (1923)
- The Virgin of Seminole (1923)
- Ten Nights in a Barroom (1926) as Willie Hammond, the Judge's Son
- The Prince of His Race (1926) as Tom Beuford
- The House Behind the Cedars (1927)
- Children of Fate (1928)
- The Scar of Shame (1929) as Alvin Hillyard
