= Ten Nights in a Barroom (1926 film) =

1926 film

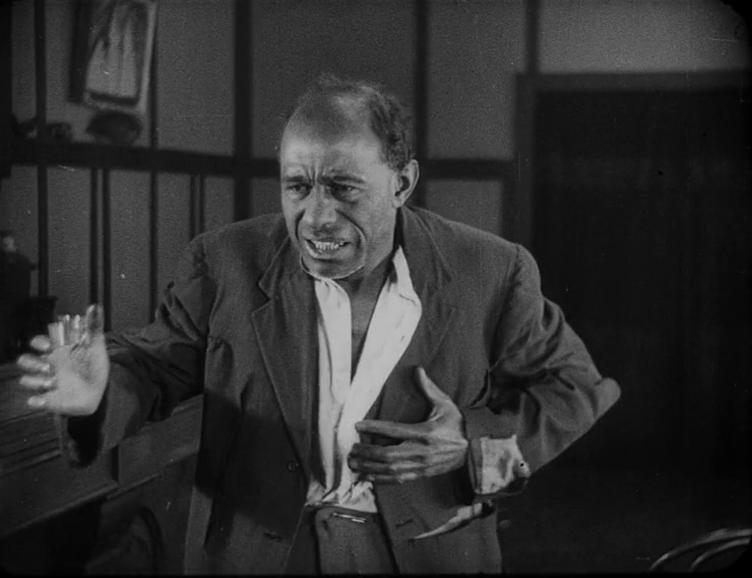
- Film still
- Directed by: Roy Calnek
- Written by: Timothy Shay Arthur
- Based on: Ten Nights in a Bar-Room; 1858 play by William W. Pratt
- Starring: Charles Gilpin; Lawrence Chenault; Myra Burwell
- Music by: Philip Carli
- Color process: Black and White
- Production company: Colored Players Film Corporation
- Release date: January 1926
- Running time: 63 minutes
- Country: United States
- Language: Silent

Ten Nights in a Barroom is a 1926 American silent drama race film directed by Roy Calnek and starring Charles Gilpin, Lawrence Chenault, and Myra Burwell.

== Plot ==
A man begins drinking heavily after he is swindled out of his mill. After his daughter is killed by a blow to the head during a bar fight, he is reborn and runs for mayor.

Ten Nights in a Barroom (1926)

== Cast ==
- Charles Gilpin as Joe Morgan
- Lawrence Chenault as Simon Slade
- Myra Burwell as Fannie Morgan
- Harry Henderson as Willie Hammond, the Judge's son
- William A. Clayton Jr. as Harvey Green, a rival for Slade's daughter
- Ethel Smith as Flora, Slade's daughter
- Arline Mickey as Mehitable Cartwright
- Edward Moore as Sample Swichel
- William Johnson as Judge Hammond
- Florence Kennedy

== Production ==
The film had a temperance theme and an African American cast. It followed on Timothy Shay Arthur's 1854 novel Ten Nights in a Bar-Room and What I Saw There and William W. Pratt's play, as well as earlier film adaptations (listed at Ten Nights in a Barroom) albeit with white casts. A man's drinking causes him to lose money, his business, and his daughter.

Oscar Micheaux's film company was a rival and released films that competed with the newer film company's releases, in this case The Spider's Web, which was released a week after it debuted. The newer film company also poached actors from Micheaux including Chenault, and both firms claimed they had the greatest star.

== Reception and legacy ==
Released during the Prohibition era the film was positively reviewed by critics. It is the second of four films released by Colored Players Film Corporation and one of two, along with The Scar of Shame, that remain in existence. A copy of Ten Nights in a Barroom which came from 35mm film elements preserved by the George Eastman Museum was released on home video in 2016 by Kino Lorber as part of the five-disc Pioneers of African-American Cinema set.

In 2025, the film was selected for preservation in the United States National Film Registry by the Library of Congress for being "culturally, historically or aesthetically significant."
