= When Men Betray =

When Men Betray refers to:

- When Men Betray (1918 film)
- When Men Betray (1929 film)
