= Colored Players Film Corporation =

American silent film production company

The Colored Players Film Corporation, also known as The Colored Players Film Corporation of Philadelphia, was an independent silent film production company based in Philadelphia, Pennsylvania. Primarily founded by David Starkman and Sherman H. Dudley in 1926, the film company for the most part made silent melodramatic films that featured all African American casts. During its brief time operating, the production company released four films, including A Prince of His Race (1926), a remake of Timothy Shay Arthur’s Ten Nights in a Bar Room (1926) with an all black cast, Children of Fate (1927), and finally The Scar of Shame (1929). Of the four films the company produced only Ten Nights in a Bar Room and The Scar of Shame remain extant. Shingzie Howard was one of its stars.

== Founders ==
Sherman H. "Uncle Dud" Dudley was born in Dallas, Texas, around 1872. Growing up Dudley was part of medicine and minstrel shows and by the 1890s had become a popular performer. He became interested and learned about films while working on the set of The Simp. Dudley, at the time, a veteran of vaudevillian and race movies had the idea for a black Hollywood free from black stereotypes. In 1926 Dudley met with David Starkman, an owner of a black theatre; Starkman shared Dudley's vision as well as hoped to aim his films to the African American population in Philadelphia. Dudley and Starkman organized the Colored Players Film Corporation placing Dudley as the President of the Corporation and Starkman in charge of the operation, management, and finances of the film production company.

== Structure ==
With the exception of Dudley and the cast of the films, the Colored Players Film Corporation was predominately funded and operated by white entrepreneurs. Although structured in such a way to give the appearance that the white staff was pulling the strings, both black and white staff members of the corporation worked together during a time in which bigotry and segregation was at its highest in America. The company in that sense was the embodiment of interracial cooperation working together towards a common goal. The goal of course for the Color Players Film Corporation was to produce films that uplifted the African American spirit by combating the humiliating, stereotypical, minstrel portrayals of African Americans in the films of the time period. However, one challenge that the Corporation had to meet was bringing in an audience because they were in competition with other independent film production companies. One solution that the Corporation was able to come up with was having expensive sets and hiring a cast that had refined their acting skills which appealed to the urban eastern audiences of the greater Philadelphia area. Unfortunately for the Corporation this solution would end up doing more harm than good in the long term as it burdened the already ailing production company.

== The Scar of Shame ==
The last film to be produced by the Colored Players Film Corporation, it was also the film production company's most critically acclaimed film that came from the Corporation. Written by David Starkman, and directed by Frank Peregini the film focuses on the social stratification among African Americans living in the same neighborhood. In the film Alvin Hilliard played by Harry Henderson, falls in love with Louise a woman from the lower caste of society. Due to this fact, Alvin is reluctant to tell his mother of his marriage to Louise and chooses to hide this information from his mother. Throughout the remaining of the film there is an internal as well as external turmoil on the part of Alvin of whether he should be with Louise despite her status as person from the "black underworld" (Cripps 197). The film gained notoriety because it represented a clash of two distinct social castes among the same racial group. The emphasis put on Alvin's decision to stay or leave Louise based on her social standing leaves viewers thinking about what is the Scar of Shame. The darker skin color? Being born into a lower level of society? Whatever the case The Scar of Shame became immensely popular among African American audiences at a time when the multiple levels of society could be seen without much trouble.

== Common themes ==
A few common themes found throughout the Colored Players Film Corporation film's is the internal conflict that the protagonist must face in order to become enlightened about an external conflict that has been plaguing them. This theme is seen in Ten Nights in a Bar Room as the protagonist chases his daughter's killer during which he discovers himself which guides him to leading a better life. This theme is also prevalent in The Scar of Shame as discussed above Alvin struggles with himself and what society expects of him. Another common theme found in the film company's productions is love. It is seen in A Prince of His Race through motherly love and more obviously in The Scar of Shame with the relationship of Alvin and Louise seen as wrong due to Louise's social status.

== Decline ==
Several factors played a role in the fall of the Colored Players Film Corporation but most prominently were the misuse of the little funds the Corporation was able to obtain. When first founded it had an initial investment of $100,000, but due to competition with other well known film production companies, such as movies produced by Oscar Micheaux and those by the Lincoln Motion Picture Company, it needed to attract audiences quickly, so the Corporation opted to use funds to hire better actors and create improved sets for the films. While this did bring in an audience it didn’t bring in the revenue it had hoped and coupled with the introduction of sound being incorporated into films, the Corporation was unable to stay financially stable and would soon be absorbed by a larger film production company after the debut of The Scar of Shame. While the Colored Players Film Corporation did not have a long life span, it provided opportunities for black actors and provided entertainment to the African American population without the employment of stereotypes or minstrel humor.

== List of films ==
- A Prince of His Race (1926)
- Ten Nights in a Barroom (1926)
- Children of Fate (1927)
- The Scar of Shame (1929)
