= Make a Million (film) =

1935 film by Lewis D. Collins

- Directed by: Lewis D. Collins
- Written by: Emmett Anthony (story); Charles Logue
- Produced by: Trem Carr (producer)
- Starring: See below
- Cinematography: Harry Neumann A.S.C.
- Edited by: Jack Ogilvie
- Distributed by: Monogram Pictures
- Release date: 1935
- Running time: 68 minutes
- Country: United States
- Language: English

Make a Million is a 1935 American film directed by Lewis D. Collins.

== Plot ==
Professor Reginald Q. Jones, associate professor for Social Economics at Pelton University, has a very clear picture of how the United States economic inequality should be changed: Fortunes are amassed by an nincompoop millionaires in the attempt to set aristocracy and wealth, instead of achievement. Student Irene Corning disagrees. She tells her father, a rich banker, who complaints to the university's director, and as the university is partly financed by this same banker, Jones is called upon to explain. He sticks to his position, so the university board decides to dismiss him from teaching classes until he can prove that his theories are applicable in real life.

He then finds himself without money on the campus, when a homeless man, Pete, asks him for a dollar. He tells Pete he gave him a dollar the day before. When Pete answers he got it two days before a policeman arrives and wants to arrest Pete. Jones pretends that Pete is a friend of his and protects him. Afterwards, he asks Pete to teach him panhandling. Pete shows him some tricks, but Pete and his fellow beggars agree he does not have the personality or talent for it.

When he gets an interview by the World Improvement League, those same people, through their questions, give him an idea: He will ask the people to make him a public millionaire to show his ideas, through public subscription of 1 dollar each. Larkey a PR-scoundrel likes Jones' idea as he sees how much money he can make. His first move is to go to rich Moxey (newspaper owner), who starts a wide newspaper campaign against Professor Jones. So the first step of publicity is made out of nearly nothing and the public already splits in pro's and con's, sending a dollar each to Professor Jones. At first Jones is furious with Larkey. When he explains, that to get the first page he would have had to pay 5 million dollars and he got it for free, he realizes that it could turn in his favor.

As he goes to see the Banker Mr. Corning in presence of his former student, the daughter Corning, only two days of his campaign, he is already in the position to deposit $25,000. The Cornings are obviously astonished. He opened a safe deposit box and puts there the 25.000 $ in one dollar bills. The Corning see another chance to break him by calling the postal authorities. Meantime Larkey has organized big banners and a whole campaign with the newspapers. When the authorities come to Jones, he is fortunately able to say he is working as an Organization: The World Improvement League. And he has to say it is a responsible Organization. So Moxey and Corning tell him that he has to appear with his board of directors Friday morning. That he has to put the money in a trust fund until the outcome of the meeting.

As Jones tell Pete and Larkey that there is no World Improvement League, that it was only a name he made up at University, Pete doesn't capitulate and starts an intensive fast training with his fellow beggars to become a fine bunch of public-spirited citizens financiers until Friday.

Pete resumes the receipt against depression: When the people have more doe, they have more doe to give away!

At the meeting: one, the london delegate tries to steel cigars, the Greek Chancellor talks to a financier telling him about the disastrous food conditions in Greek so that this one is willing to give the Greek some money. And Pete looking everywhere to control his men. As Irene intrudes the meeting, the whole setup is revealed. The Inspector gives Jones 15 days to complete the fund, if not the money has to be redistributed to the public.

Jones has the chance to get into a radio transmission, supported by a toothpaste- enterprise: Nervo, how much nerve you can have using Nervo. He should have about 15 Million people audience; so he and his fellows hope to be able to get the rest of the money. But Corning doesn't pass the cheque about 1000,- $ Nervo sends Jones as advance for expense money to get the boys to Chicago, because he wants to prevent Jones to get his voice to an audience of 15 Million people. His daughter Irene at that point changes side: she tells her dad that what he does is illegal. Corning asserts the public has to be protected from fools as Jones is. He sends back the cheque to Nervo. Irene talks with Jones, Pete and Larkey and she is able to convince Jones to go with her car to Chicago, while Pete and the boys will arrange with the railroad. Larkey reads them a telegram from Nervo telling them, they are expected in Chicago.

A street chase starts, during which Irene and "Reggie" get closer. At night resting in the car she asks him what he will do, when he will have the million. He says he will distribute the surplus. On the question if it will change his life, he answers: the trouble in this country is the uncertainty of disposing of the surplus. The manufactures sold part of the goods to the profit. And if the remaining would be bought by the government at the cost of material and labour, there would be no failure.

Asked by Jones to repeat what he said, Irine answers: Surplus women and no distribution!

In Chicago Jones is able to talks some minutes to the Radio audience thanks to Pete making the show of his life as an epileptic to divert the police. Finally Jones is able to distribute the surplus, as the million is achieved: every citizen who gave one dollar is rewarded by a good worth 3,- $, and the manufacturers received cash pay off their obligations. So he demonstrated what could be done with his theories.

Larkey brings new letters from all over the country. People were so satisfied with the articles they got from the Million fund, that they write Jones to do it again. "Bargain of the month club" is going to be the name of the enterprise, and to earn something Irene suggested to take from each dollar 1 penny, that would make 10.000,-$ a month by 1 Million. The men and Pete are distributed all over the United States to run each a branch of the enterprise. And finally Irene has made of Professor Jones a rich man, as her father. And herself, just a wife!

== Cast ==
- Charles Starrett as Professor Reginald Q. Jones
- Pauline Brooks as Irene Corning
- George E. Stone as Larkey
- James Burke as Pete
- Guy Usher as Corning
- Norman Houston as Moxey
- Monte Carter as Benny
- Jimmy Aubrey as Soapy
- George Cleveland as Fake Blind Beggar
- John Elliott as Dean (young)
- Robert Cummings as Dean (old)
