= William Fountaine =

American film actor

William Fountaine (August 15, 1897 – December 6, 1945) was a film actor in the United States. He starred in Oscar Micheaux's 1922 film Uncle Jasper's Will, The Dungeon released the same year, and Deceit in 1923. He had a leading role in the well received 1929 musical film Hallelujah. According to an account of experiences filming the movie, Fountaine protested at bigoted dialogue he was supposed to say stating he "wouldn't be able to return to Harlem" if he repeated the lines in the script.

== Filmography ==
- Uncle Jasper's Will (1922)
- The Virgin of Seminole (1922)
- The Dungeon (1922) as Stephen Cameron
- Deceit (1923)
- Hallelujah (1929) as Hot Shot
