= Gillian Bowser =

American researcher

- Born: 1960 (age 65–66); New York
- Education: Northwestern University (B.S.), University of Vermont (M.S.), University of Missouri (Ph.D.)

Gillian Bowser is an American wildlife ecologist, research scientist, and associate professor at Colorado State University. Her work largely centers on climate change with focuses on pollinators and citizen science.

== Early life and education ==
Bowser was born in New York to African-American film archivist Pearl Bowser and civil rights activist LeRoy Bowser. As a child, she was a member of Ranger Rick's Nature Club. She attended LaGuardia High School of the Arts as an art major, completing a degree in fine arts with a focus on medical illustration. She earned her B.S. from Northwestern University, her M.S. from the University of Vermont, and her Ph.D. from the University of Missouri.

== Career ==
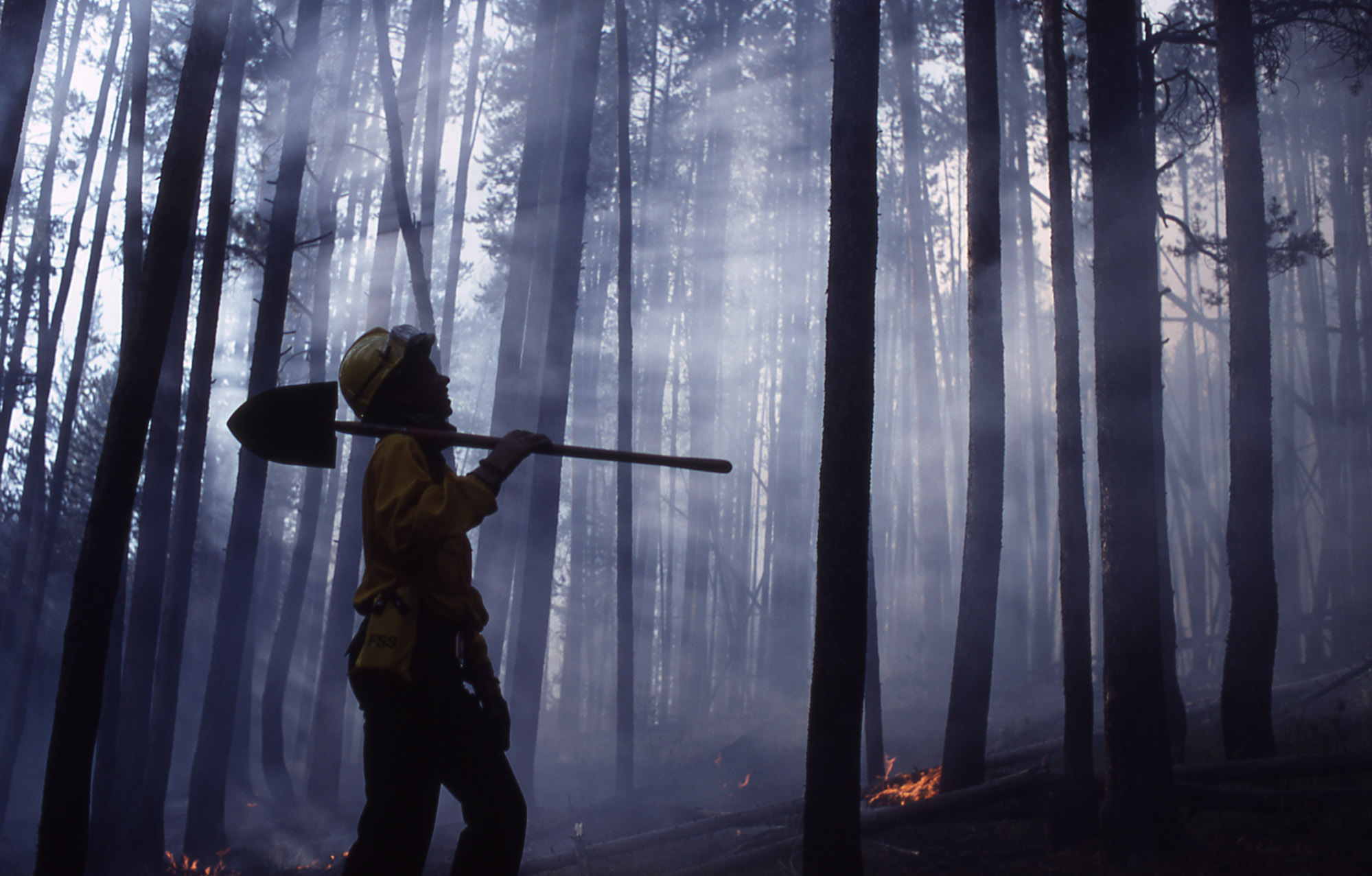
Bowser during the 1988 Yellowstone Fires

Bowser started working at Yellowstone National Park as a college student, where she eventually became a wildlife biologist. She was present during the fires in 1988. She also worked for the National Park Service in Grand Teton National Park, Joshua Tree National Park, Wrangell–St. Elias National Park and Preserve, and for the headquarters in Washington, D.C.

Bowser was a 2011–2012 American Association for the Advancement of Science Executive Branch Fellow at the United States Department of State and a 2022 AAAS Fellow of Science and Engineering. She was a 2014 Fulbright Specialist to Peru, during which she studied indicators of climate change at Huascarán National Park.

Bowser is an environmental assessment expert for the United Nations Environment Programme's Global Environmental Outlook and participated in the UN Framework Convention on Climate Change, and is a section leader for the U.S. Global Change Research Program's National Nature Assessment. She is currently an executive committee member of the International Union of Biological Sciences.

As a researcher, Bowser studied elk and bison in Yellowstone National Park, and pollinators in national parks around the world. Broadly, she focuses on how climate change affects pollinators and ecological indicators of climate change. She promotes citizen science as a tool to track ecological changes, particularly to understand the impacts of climate change in national parks and protected areas. She is an advocate for underrepresented minorities in STEM, and is a principal investigator of the National Science Foundation-funded Fieldwork Inspiring Expanded Leadership for Diversity (FIELD) project working to reduce barriers in geoscientific field activity.

== Notable publications ==
- Environment, U. N. (2019). Global environment outlook—GEO-6: healthy planet, healthy people. Nairobi. DOI 10.1017/9781108627146.
- Cooper, C. B., Hawn, C. L., Larson, L. R., Parrish, J. K., Bowser, G., Cavalier, D., Dunn, R. R., Haklay, M. (Muki), Gupta, K. K., Jelks, N. O., Johnson, V. A., Katti, M., Leggett, Z., Wilson, O. R., & Wilson, S. (2021). Inclusion in citizen science: The conundrum of rebranding. Science, 372(6549), 1386–1388. https://doi.org/10.1126/science.abi6487
- Shinbrot, X. A., Wilkins, K., Gretzel, U., & Bowser, G. (2019). Unlocking women’s sustainability leadership potential: Perceptions of contributions and challenges for women in sustainable development. World Development, 119, 120–132. https://doi.org/10.1016/j.worlddev.2019.03.009
- Morales, N., Bisbee O’Connell, K., McNulty, S., Berkowitz, A., Bowser, G., Giamellaro, M., & Miriti, M. N. (2020). Promoting inclusion in ecological field experiences: Examining and overcoming barriers to a professional rite of passage. The Bulletin of the Ecological Society of America, 101(4), e01742. https://doi.org/10.1002/bes2.1742
