= Midnight Ramble (film) =

- Directed by: Pearl Bowser; Bestor Cram
- Written by: Clyde Taylor; Beth Deare
- Produced by: Bestor Cram; Pamela A. Thomas
- Starring: James Avery; Toni Cade Bambara; St. Claire Bourne Sr. Pearl Bowser; Dorothy Delfs
- Cinematography: Bestor Cram; Bruce Johnson
- Edited by: Kathy Russ
- Music by: Caleb Sampson
- Distributed by: American Experience
- Release date: October 26, 1994
- Running time: 57 minutes
- Country: United States
- Language: English

Midnight Ramble is a 1994 documentary about the early history of Black American movies from the period between 1910 and 1950. Known as "race movies", these films, traditionally independent of Hollywood, were made primarily by, for and about the black community. This documentary is a tribute to a film genre that lasted for more than 40 years, produced over 500 movies, and created a foundation for contemporary films from directors such as Spike Lee and Tyler Perry. James Avery narrates this exploration of the early black film industry. There is a mistaken assumption that "race films" began largely in reaction to D. W. Griffith's 1915 The Birth of a Nation. Nothing could be further from the truth. Race movies actually began around 1910 in Chicago in response to the Black Community longing to see themselves reflected on the silver screen via this new medium of film. Wanting to see themselves through their own eyes, on their own terms thus counteracting the Hollywood stereotypes within the American media.

The film focuses especially on the work of Oscar Micheaux, considered the "Dean of Black American film", a controversial filmmaker who wrote, produced, and directed over 40 features, and tackled difficult social issues in Black America. It includes clips from films by a number of African-American directors of the period, which is very helpful since many of these films are difficult to find or unavailable. There are two versions of the title of the documentary, both referring to the same work. Initially released in 1994 as, Midnight Ramble: Oscar Micheaux & the Story of Race Movies It was re-released as Midnight Ramble: The Story of the Black Film Industry by PBS in 1995 The 1995 version also eliminates the David McCullugh introduction.

== Synopsis ==
The documentary begins with an explanation of the social context for American blacks at the turn of the 20th century. It then looks at milestones in the development of race films. This includes a look at early silent films, most notably the work of William Foster (The Pullman Porter, 1910).

Homesteader, and writer, Oscar Micheaux, the grandson of slaves, shifted his attention to film, releasing his first film, The Homesteader, in 1918, followed in 1920 by Within Our Gates (considered the answer film to Griffith's The Birth of A Nation) and The Symbol of the Unconquered in 1921. With the transition to sound, Micheaux continued to make race films, some of which were controversial even within the Black community.

While the advent of sound decreased the number of race films being made, due to the rise in costs, notable films continued to be released. This included a series of three singing-cowboy movies starring Herb Jeffries as "The Bronze Buckaroo."

== Cast list ==
- James Avery: Narrator
- Toni Cade Bambara: Commentator (author)
- Elton Fax: Commentator (illustrator)
- Carlton Moss: Commentator (filmmaker)
- Dorothy Delfs: Commentator
- Shingzie Howard: Commentator (actress)
- Herb Jeffries: Commentator (actor)
- Robert Hall: Commentator (historian)
- Pearl Bowser: Commentator (archivist)
- Frances E. Williams: Commentator (actress)
- Olive Delfs: Commentator
- St. Claire Bourne Sr.: Commentator (journalist)
- Edna Mae Harris: Commentator (actress)

== Influence ==
Midnight Ramble was chosen as the lead-off for a 1998 Turner Classic Movie Channel series, A Separate Cinema, in which 29 race films were shown, including Micheaux's 1920 Within Our Gates and The Symbol of the Unconquered (1921). In selecting the films to be shown, producers called upon the expertise of its staff, film historians, professors at Yale and Duke universities, and film archivist Pearl Bowser, who also co-directed Midnight Ramble.
