= Iris Hall =

Barbadian-American actress (1892–1984)

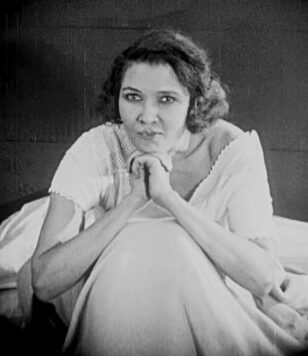
- Iris Hall in The Symbol of the Unconquered
- Born: 1892; Barbados
- Died: 1984 (aged 91–92)
- Occupation: Actor

Iris Hall (1892–1984) was a Barbadian-American actor. She appeared in leading roles in two race films by the pioneering African-American director Oscar Micheaux: The Homesteader (1919) and The Symbol of the Unconquered (1920).

Iris Hall was born on 1892 in Barbados. Her family emigrated to the United States when Hall was a teenager. She worked in Harlem as a singer, dancer, and beautician. She joined the Lafayette Players, a stock company of African-American stage actors, in 1916. She later joined African-American producer Sidney Perrin's company and appeared in Show Folks (1920) and High Flyers (1921). She also appeared in Strut, Miss Lizzie (1922).

In The Homesteader, a now lost film, Hall played Agnes, the daughter of a white Scottish man who is unaware that her mother was mulatto. A black homesteader, Jean Baptiste, falls in love with her but they are unable to marry until he discovers she is black as well. Micheaux wrote of her in a letter: " A Miss Hall, sweet, tender, vivacious and clever - yet possessing all that which I have desired to play the sort of Agnes - can pass for white and is just the size. She has been with the Lafayette Stock Players for three years and has worked in movies as a maid with Pauline Frederick and can make up fine."

In The Symbol of the Unconquered, Hall played Eve Mason, who inherits land from her grandfather, a prospector. Though Eve is black, she is light-skinned enough that she often inadvertently passes for white. She is helped by her new neighbor, black prospector Hugh Van Allen, and they foil schemes to claim their land. After oil is discovered, Van Allen becomes a rich oil baron and Eve reveals to him she is black as well.

She did not appear in any further films by Micheaux. Little is known of her life following her film career. Iris Hall died in 1984.
