= Starkman =

Starkman is a surname. Notable people with the surname include:

- David Starkman (1885–c. 1947), Austrian-American silent film businessman
- Haim Starkman (born 1944), Israeli basketball player
- Maxwell Starkman (1921–2003), Canadian-American architect
- Randy Starkman (1960–2012), Canadian sports journalist
