= Cleo Desmond =

American actress

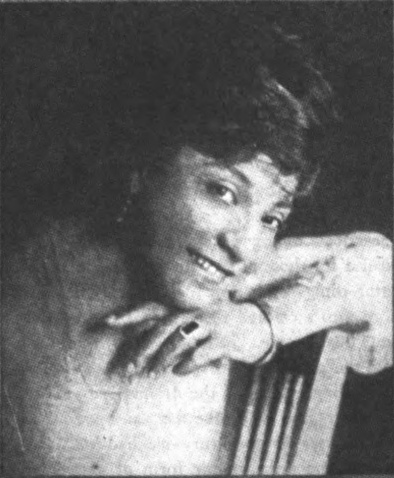
- Born: Minnie Matilda Hatfield; April 25, 1880; Philadelphia, Pennsylvania, U.S.
- Died: October 6, 1958 (aged 78); San Diego, California, U.S.
- Occupation: Actress

Cleo Desmond (born Minnie Matilda Hatfield, April 25, 1880 – October 6, 1958) was an American actress and vaudeville performer who had a long career on the stage and screen.

She began acting and performing at a young age, appearing in plays and in vaudeville acts as early as 1903 under the stage name Cleo Desmond. She gained nationwide attention as a member of the Lafayette Players. She and Andrew S. Bishop drew adoring fans to their theatrical performances.

She eventually won some film roles and was cast in several of Oscar Micheaux's films.

== Selected filmography ==
- Mokey (1942)
- Mr. Washington Goes to Town (1941)
- Am I Guilty? (1940)
- Spirit of Youth (1938)
- The Millionaire (1927)
- Deceit (1923)
- The Easiest Way (1917)
