= The Easiest Way =

The Easiest Way may refer to:

- The Easiest Way, a 1909 play by Eugene Walter
- The Easiest Way (1917 film), a 1917 film based on the play
- The Easiest Way (1931 film), a 1931 film based on the play
