= Ten Nights in a Barroom =

Ten Nights in a Barroom may refer to:

- Ten Nights in a Bar-Room and What I Saw There, an 1854 temperance novel by American author Timothy Shay Arthur
  - Ten Nights in a Bar-Room (play) an 1858 play by William W. Pratt
  - Ten Nights in a Bar-Room (1901 film), an American film
  - Ten Nights in a Bar Room (1910 film), an American film by the Thanhouser Company
  - Ten Nights in a Bar Room (1911 film), an American film by the Selig Company
  - Ten Nights in a Bar Room (1913 film), an American film by the Photo Drama Company
  - Ten Nights in a Bar Room (1921 film), an American film by Blazed Trail Productions
  - Ten Nights in a Barroom (1926 film), an American film by the Colored Players of Philadelphia
  - Ten Nights in a Barroom (1931 film), an American film directed by William A. O'Connor
