= The House Behind the Cedars =

1927 film

The Veiled Aristocrats
- Directed by: Oscar Micheaux
- Written by: Oscar Micheaux
- Produced by: Oscar Micheaux
- Starring: Shingzie Howard; Lawrence Chenault; C. D. Griffith
- Distributed by: Micheaux Film Corporation
- Release date: 1927
- Country: United States
- Language: English

The House Behind the Cedars is a 1927 silent race film directed, written, produced and distributed by director Oscar Micheaux. It was loosely adapted from the 1900 novel of the same name by African American writer Charles W. Chesnutt, who explored issues of race, class, and identity in the post-Civil War South. No print of the film is known to exist, and it is considered lost. Micheaux remade the film in 1932 under the title Veiled Aristocrats.

At first, the Virginia Censorship Board banned the film from being shown in the state, saying it would threaten race relations. In 1924, the state had passed the Racial Integrity Act incorporating the one-drop rule into law for the first time. It classified as Black, for state record-keeping, any person with any known African ancestry, regardless of their self-identification or community. Although Micheaux made some cuts to get the film distributed, he wrote to the board: "There has been but one picture that incited the colored people to riot and that still does. [T]hat picture is Birth of a Nation."

== Plot ==
Rena is a young woman of mixed race. Although she is romantically pursued by an upwardly-mobile African American named Frank, she does not decide in his favor. Although she has grown up in the Black community, her appearance allows her to pass for white, as she is of majority European ancestry.

Rena meets and falls in love with George Tryon, a young white aristocrat. But as their relationship deepens, she believes that she must acknowledge her African ancestry. She leaves John and returns to Frank, yet her decision creates great inner turmoil. As she accepts Frank as her husband, she confesses: "Frank, I am miserable."

== Production ==
The House Behind the Cedars was adapted from the 1900 novel by the American writer Charles W. Chesnutt. Chesnutt was of mixed-race and predominately European ancestry, with a portion of African. He grew up in the "Black" community, where his ancestors had been classified because of slavery. He explored issues of race among those of similar mixed-race descent, particularly in the postwar South. This is the second of two Oscar Micheaux films based on Chesnutt's books. His 1926 production of The Conjure Woman was the first, based on a story in Chesnutt's collection by that name published in 1899.

Micheaux promoted The House Behind the Cedars by calling attention to the current scandal in New York related to the legal proceedings of Leonard Rhinelander, a wealthy socialite who sought to have his marriage to Alice Jones annulled after he discovered her mixed-race parentage. Although the plot of The House Behind the Cedars differed significantly from the Rhinelander case, the film's advertising campaign noted its similarities to the contemporary legal case. Advertising included statements such as, "An Amazing Parallel to the Famous Rhinelander Case!", and "Rhinelander Case at the Regent". A longer account said, "The House Behind the Cedars is a remarkable parallel to the famous Rhinelander Case ... It tells the story of a beautiful mulatto girl who poses as white, and is wooed and won by a young white millionaire. Although worried, she does not betray her secret. Then comes the discovery as in the Rhinelander case."

Lawrence Chenault, who played the white aristocrat, was a light-skinned, mixed-race actor. Shingzie Howard, who played Rena, was also of mixed race. She had previously starred in Micheaux's films The Virgin of the Seminole and Uncle Jasper's Will.

Micheaux shot The House Behind the Cedars in Roanoke, Virginia. When he returned to the state to secure exhibition locales, he found that the three-man Virginia Board of Censors banned the film from theaters because the Board found it "so objectionable, in fact, as to necessitate its total rejection". This was only a few years after the white Democratic legislature, which had disfranchised most black voters earlier in the century, had passed its Racial Integrity Act of 1924. This instituted the one-drop rule, by which any person with any African heritage was classified as black for state record-keeping.

The board called in other state officials to help them review the film, including Walter Plecker, a supporter of eugenics who implemented the new act, and other known supporters of white supremacy. All were white. Officials found the film's story too threatening to its Jim Crow social order, despite the well-documented history of miscegenation and mixed-race slaves in colonial and antebellum Virginia. They suggested it would threaten current relations between the races.

Micheaux agreed to make some cuts in the film, while remarking that no other state or censorship board had objected or required changes. He said it had been screened in many areas "without incident." He also noted that when the Chesnutt novel had been published 30 years earlier, it was "read by over a thousand white people to every colored person." He said, "There has been but one picture that incited the colored people to riot and that still does. [T]hat picture is Birth of a Nation." After his cuts, the film was shown in Virginia.

Afterward, the board used its review of the film into "a litmus test for the proper allegiance of white civil servants to the Racial Integrity Act." Finding some of board member Arthur James' comments insufficiently critical of the film, they released them to John Powell, leader of the Anglo-Saxon Clubs, an organization devoted to white supremacy. Powell initiated threats to James' position and generated letters of strong criticism by the members of the Anglo-Saxon Clubs. James survived the attacks and was later appointed as commissioner of Public Welfare.

Micheaux remade The House Behind the Cedars in 1932 under the title Veiled Aristocrats. No print of The House Behind the Cedars is known to exist, and it is presumed to be a lost film.

== Cast ==
The cast included:

- Lawrence Chenault as John Walden
- Shingzie Howard as Rena Walden
- C. D. Griffith
- Andrew S. Bishop as George Tyron
- Alma Sewell
- Willian F.B. Crowell (William Crowell)
- Douglas Griffin
- Oliver Hill

== See also ==
- Film censorship in the United States
- List of lost films
