= Simp (disambiguation) =

Simp is derogatory Internet slang for a man seen as displaying excessive sympathy or attention toward a woman online.

Simp or SIMP may also refer to:

== Art, entertainment, and media ==
=== Film ===
- The Simp, 1920 film from Educational Pictures
- The Simp (1921 film), 1921 film from REOL Productions
- The Poor Simp, a 1920 film from Selznick Pictures

=== Music ===
- Squirrels in My Pants, a song featured in 2007 animated series Phineas and Ferb
- The Simp, a 2007 album by Baby Teeth (band)
- The Simps, a band founded by Eyedress (Idris Ennolandy Vicuña)

== Science and technology ==
- Solid Isotropic Material with Penalisation, a method of topology optimization
- Sondage Infrarouge de Mouvement Propre (SIMP; Proper Motion Infrared Survey), an all-sky survey and astronomical catalogue
- Strongly interacting massive particle, a hypothetical elementary particle
- Supplemental IRAS Minor Planet Survey (SIMPS), based on the IRAS survey

== Other uses ==
- Solitary Islands Marine Park, New South Wales
- Sri Indera Mahkota Pahang, an honor given by the Sultan of Pahang, Malaysia
- Simp., a non-standard abbreviation for 'simplified', as in "Simplified Chinese"
- The Stanford Improvisors (Simps), an academic group at Stanford University

== See also ==
- EconSimp, a fisheries management model
- SIMP J013656.5+093347, a brown dwarf
- Simpleton
- Simpson (disambiguation)
