= The Millionaire (1927 film) =

1927 film directed by Oscar Micheaux

- Directed by: Oscar Micheaux
- Written by: Oscar Micheaux
- Produced by: Oscar Micheaux
- Starring: Grace Smith; Laurence Criner; Lionel Monagas
- Production company: Micheaux Film Corp.
- Distributed by: Micheaux Film
- Release date: December 1927
- Country: United States

The Millionaire is a 1927 film directed by Oscar Micheaux.

== Cast ==
- Grace Smith
- J. Lawrence Criner
- Cleo Desmond
- Lionel Monagas
- William Edmonson
- Vera Brocker
- S. T. Jacks
- E. G. Tatum
- Chicago Defender editor Robert S. Abbott also appears in the film
