= The Homesteader =

1919 film by Oscar Micheaux

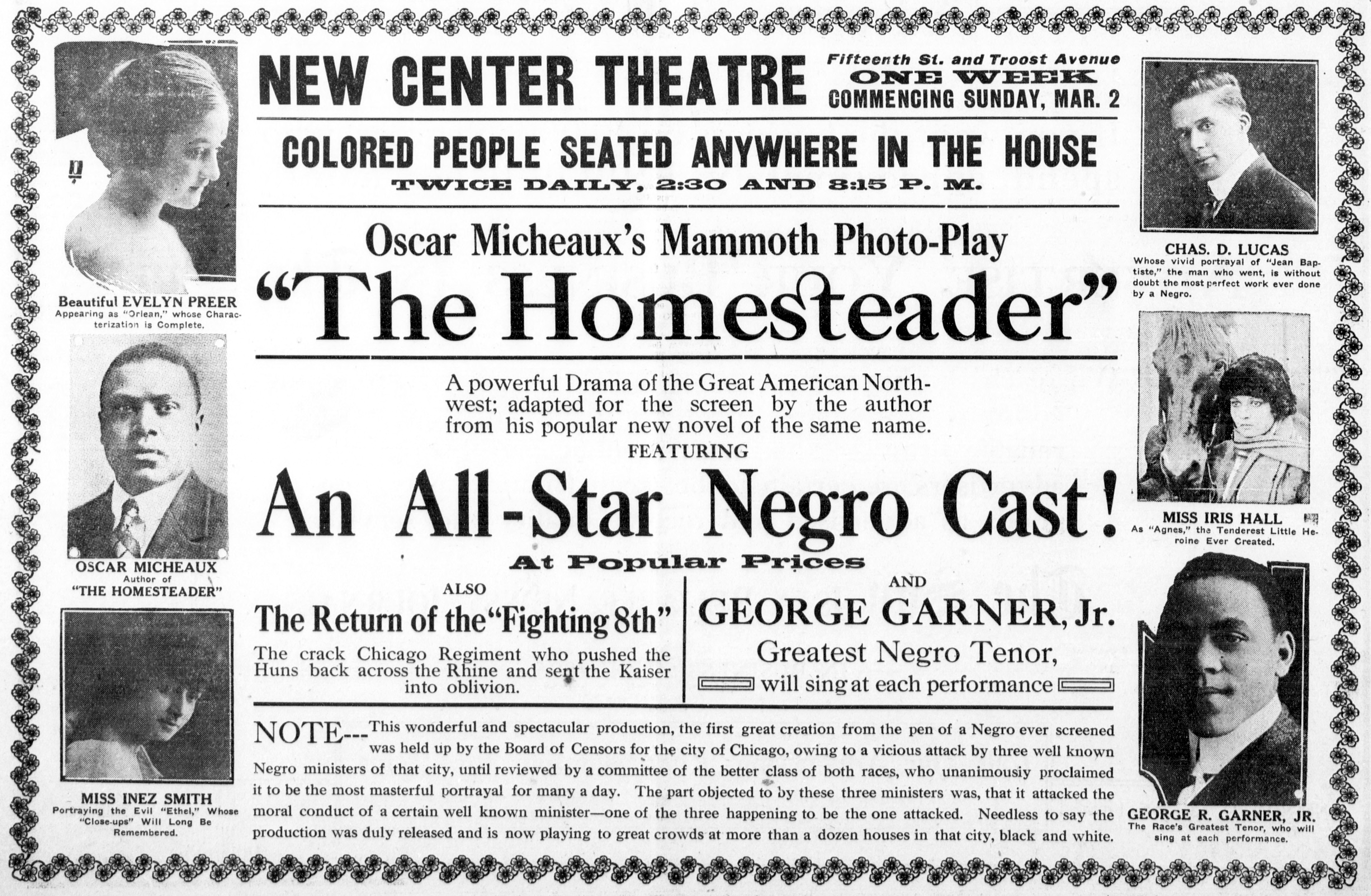
- Newspaper advertisement
- Directed by: Oscar Micheaux
- Written by: Oscar Micheaux
- Produced by: Oscar Micheaux
- Starring: Charles D. Lucas; Evelyn Preer; Iris Hall; Inez Smith; Vernon S. Duncan; Charles S. More; Trevy Woods; William George
- Distributed by: Micheaux Book & Film Company
- Release date: March 1919
- Country: United States
- Languages: Silent; English subtitles

The Homesteader is a lost 1919 American silent drama film by African-American author and filmmaker Oscar Micheaux. The film is based on his novel inspired by his experiences.

== Plot ==
The Homesteader involves six principal characters, the leading one being Jean Baptiste (Charles D. Lucas), a homesteader far off in the Dakotas, the lone African American living in the area. To this wilderness arrives Jack Stewart, a Scotsman, with his motherless daughter, Agnes (Iris Hall), who doesn't know that she is biracial. In Agnes, Baptiste meets the girl of his dreams. Peculiar fate threw her in the company of the Homesteader, but, because Baptiste is black and Agnes is presumably white, their love is forbidden by law. Baptiste eventually sacrifices the love of this girl of his dreams, goes back to his own people and marries Orlean, the daughter of a black preacher named McCarthy.

McCarthy, the embodiment of vanity, deceit and hypocrisy, really admires the marriage his daughter has made. He speaks of the "rich" young man she has married, praises him to the highest. Baptiste does not know, however, that McCarthy requires and is in the habit of having people praise him. Baptiste does not do it because he is not of the temperament to do so. Because of this failure grows the tragedy of mismarriage to Orlean (Evelyn Preer), a sweet girl, kind and good, but like her mother, without the strength of her convictions.

Baptiste, Orlean having failed him, is persecuted by McCarthy and by Ethel (McCarthy's other daughter), who, like her father, possesses all the evil a woman is capable of; she is married to weak-kneed Glavis. In the end, Orlean, driven insane by the evil she had been the innocent cause of, rights a wrong which causes Baptiste to go back to his land in the Dakotas, where he finds the girl he first discovered. Later, he learns the truth about her race and the story has a beautiful ending.

== Cast ==
- Charles D. Lucas as Jean Baptiste
- Evelyn Preer as Orleans
- Iris Hall as Agnes
- Charles S. Moore as Jack Stewart
- Inez Smith as Ethel
- Vernon S. Duncan as McCarthy
- Trevy Woods as Glavis, Ethel's Husband
- William George as Agnes' White Lover

== Production ==
The film was produced, co-directed and written for the screen by Micheaux, based on his book of the same name. It is believed to be the first feature-length film made with a black cast and crew, for a black audience, and thus the first example of a race movie. Most of the filming, if not all, took place in Winner, South Dakota. Micheaux, using his considerable skills as a businessman and salesman, sold stock in his corporation to the white farmers around Sioux City, Iowa at prices ranging from $75 to $100 per share.

Eventually enough capital was secured to produce the eight-reel film starring Charles Lucas as the male lead, and Evelyn Preer and Iris Hall, two well-known dramatic actresses who at the time were associated with the Lafayette Players Stock Company.

Presumably, this was the first film directed by Oscar Micheaux.
