= Al Liguori =

Alfonso Liguori
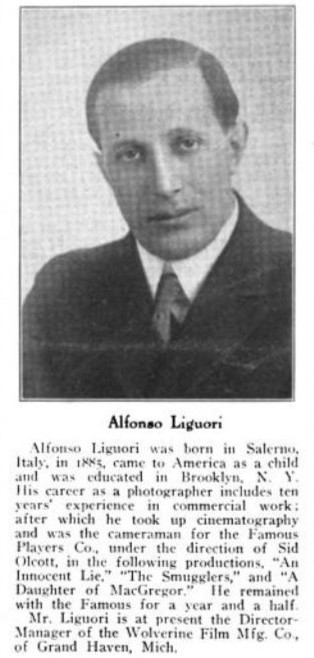
- Born: Alfonso Liguori; June 3, 1885; Salerno, Italy
- Died: May 8, 1951 (aged 65); Overbrook Hills, Pennsylvania
- Occupation: cinematographer

Al Liguori (June 3, 1885 - May 8, 1951) was an Italian born cinematographer mainly of the silent era. His style of photography was a precursor to what became known as film noir. His best known surviving film is the all-black Scar of Shame (1927). He came to America as a child and his family settled in Brooklyn New York where he was educated. He was born in Salerno Italy and died in Pennsylvania in 1951.

== Selected filmography ==
- The Innocent Lie (1916)
- The Smugglers (1916)
- Marie, Ltd. (1919)
- Redhead (1919)
- The Teeth of the Tiger (1919)
- The World and His Wife (1920)
- The Passionate Pilgrim (1921)
- Straight Is the Way (1921)
- The Woman God Changed (1921)
- Boomerang Bill (1922)
- Timothy's Quest (1922)
- Salome of the Tenements (1925)
- The Scar of Shame (1927)
