= Pearl Bowser =

American author (1931–2023)

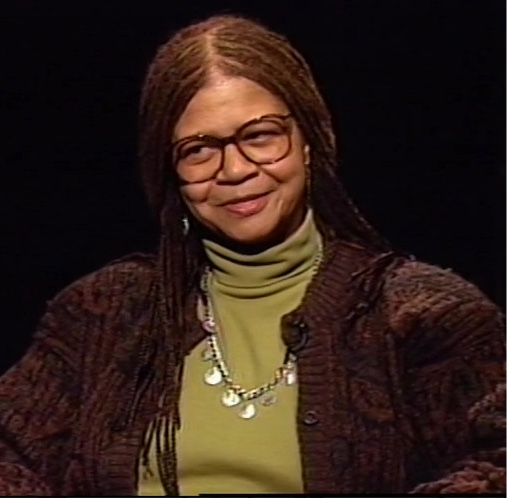
Bowser on CUNY TV's Cinema Then, Cinema Now (1993)

Pearl Bowser (née Johnson; June 25, 1931 – September 14, 2023) was an American author, collector, television director, film scholar, film director, producer, filmmaker, independent distributor and film archivist. Along with her peers Mel Roman and Charles Hobson, Bowser researched and curated "The Black Film" retrospective at the Jewish Museum in 1970. This prompted a new wave of public interest into "exhibiting, producing, and engaging with African American cinema beyond borders". Most of her exalted career was spent traveling the globe in order to cultivate audiences for marginalized filmmakers. An example of her efforts, and also her most groundbreaking work, manifested in her research on "early-1900s Black film pioneer Oscar Micheaux". This research can be seen in her book on the first ten years of the career of Oscar Micheaux, an African-American who directed 40 "race pictures" between 1918 and 1940. She is thus credited for having helped rediscover some of Oscar Micheaux's rare surviving films. She is the founder of African Diaspora Images, a collection of visual and oral histories that documents the history of African-American filmmaking. Part of her journey included teaching young people film in the 1960s and 1970s.

Though Bowser initially set out to research the role of Black women in early African-American filmmaking, she eventually studied both genders because too few Black women were among the earliest African-American filmmakers.

In 2012, Bowser gifted her library of films to the Smithsonian Institution's Center for African American Media Arts. Some of the works in her collection include Hands of Image directed by John W. Fletcher, Statutes Hardly Smile directed by Stan Lathan, and Four Women directed by Julie Dash. These are maintained by Earl W. and Amanda Stafford and can be found at the National Museum of African American History and Culture.

== Early life ==
Pearl Bowser was born Pearl Johnson on June 25,1931, in Sugar Hill, Harlem, New York, as the youngest of seven children. She was named after her mother, also Pearl Johnson, who was a domestic worker. She frequented the movie theaters of Harlem along 125th street watching "Hollywood Westerns, B-movies and whatever black films were out at the time." Bowser was exposed to a lot of racism growing up. She even recalled one of her white kindergarten teachers wearing gloves so as not to touch the Black students. Despite this, she excelled academically all throughout high school and attended Brooklyn College on a scholarship. Disappointed with the level of education she received there, she dropped out to work at CBS as a Nielsen rating analyzer.

Bowser discovered and joined an interracial club that gathered in the Bronx park, Tibbetts Brook, called the Paul Robeson Club. She was able to find a sense of identity and pride from Robeson's club where he would share information about culture, art, and film.

In 1955 Pearl married LeRoy Bowser and soon they were both working on the Civil Rights Movement. LeRoy was active in Brooklyn CORE (Congress of Racial Equality) and Pearl "along with other production activists, took to the streets documenting African American culture and issues—working to bring these films to schools".

== Career ==
Bowser stumbled upon her career in film when a friend, documentary filmmaker Ricky Leacock, asked her to work in his office where she helped out with billing and ordering equipment. Bowser started teaching seminars and workshops on African-American and African film at universities, libraries and museums in 1971. This same year, she organized her first film festival, the Black Film History Series. In 1979, she Bowser organized the first American women's film festival in New York City. These festivals presented a major retrospective, Independent Black American Cinema 1920-1980. Feeding off this success, in 1989, she, alongside Grant Munro, programmed the 35th Flaherty Film Seminar, which featured films such as Finzan, Zajota The Boogie Spirit, Daughters of the Dust, and many more. Additionally, while accomplishing all this, Bowser was the director of the Theater Project at Third World Newsreel, the largest distributor of independent film by people of color in the United States, from 1978 to 1987.

In the 1980s, Bowser received a grant from the Ford Foundation to travel around the United States and "collect oral histories from individuals in Oscar Micheaux's orbit, loosely following the route he would have travelled decades earlier". This including cities in Virginia, Tennessee, and Mississippi. It was through this research that she became a prominent figure in the Black independent film industry, because as she was traveling, she was showing films by independent Black filmmakers.

Despite all her experience and knowledge surrounding the film industry, Bowser did not make her directorial debut until the 1990s. Her first documentary film, Midnight Ramble, looks at African American roles and relationships to Hollywood movies from 1910 to the 1950s. After releasing this documentary, Bowser founded and directed the Chamba Educational Film Services, a film distribution company that specialized in distributing films by African American filmmakers. In the early 1980s, she renamed her company/collection as African Diaspora Images, a collection of historical and contemporary films documenting Black film history.

Bowser died in Brooklyn, New York, on September 14, 2023, at the age of 92.

== Filmography ==
- Namibia: Independence Now! (1985)
- Wild Women Don't Have the Blues (1989)
- Midnight Ramble: Oscar Micheaux and the Story of Black Movies (1994)
- The Watermelon Woman (1996)
- Women of Vision: Histories in Feminist Film & Video (1998)
- That's Black Entertainment: Westerns (2002)
- Secrets of New York (2005)
- In the Shadow of Hollywood: Race Movies and the Birth of Black Cinema (2007)

== Publications ==
- Writing Himself Into History: Oscar Micheaux, His Silent Films, and His Audiences, 2000, Rutgers University Press
- The History of Black Film, article in Black Film Review.
- Oscar Micheaux and His Circle (Catalog)
