= Ida Anderson =

Actress (died 1942)

Ida Anderson (died January 29, 1942) was an actress on stage and screen.

She was part of the Lafayette Players. She also performed with the Anita Bush stock company, the Charles Gilpin Players, and the Quality Amusement company.

Anderson was from Culpeper, Virginia. She married and later separated from her teacher, Charles H. Anderson. Alfred Chester performed with the Ida Anderson Players.

Anderson died on January 29, 1942 at the age of 54. She was buried in Mt. Olive Cemetery in Maspeth, Queens.

== Filmography ==
- Secret Sorrow (1921), a REOL Productions film
- A Son of Satan (1924) (working title *Ghost of Tolston's Manor)
- Gayety (1929), a Vitaphone short
