= Beth Deare =

American film producer

Aloyce Beth DuVal Deare, known as Beth Deare, was an American film producer and educator.

She co-wrote the 1994 documentary film Midnight Ramble about African American films.

She was a producer at WGBH in Boston. She taught at Bunker Hill Community College. She received 10 Emmy Awards, including for her 1981 documentary In the Matter of Levi Hart and the television series Say Brother. In 2011 she died at her Newtown, Massachusetts home in Newton Corner.

== Filmography ==
- In the Matter of Levi Hart (1981), documentary about a police shooting
- Midnight Ramble (film) (1994), co-writer, a film about African American cinema
- Say Brother, television series, host and executive producer
