= The Scar of Shame =

1929 film

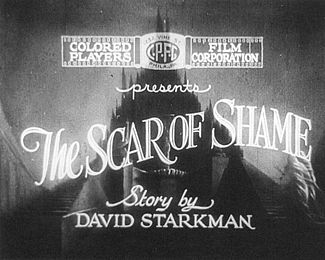
- Scar of Shame title card
- Directed by: Frank Peregini
- Written by: David Starkman
- Produced by: David Starkman
- Starring: Harry Henderson; Norman Johnstone; Ann Kennedy
- Cinematography: Al Liguori
- Music by: Philip Carli
- Production company: Colored Players Film Corporation
- Distributed by: State Rights
- Release date: 1929
- Running time: 8 reels
- Country: United States
- Language: Silent

The Scar of Shame (1929) by Frank Peregini

The Scar of Shame is a silent film shot in the winter of 1927 and released in April 1929. It is a silent melodrama film featuring black actors and was written for a predominantly black audience. It premiered from April 13–17, 1929 in the M&S Douglas Theatre in New York City. Its second screening ran from April 15–20, 1929 at Gibson's Theatre, Philadelphia.

It was produced by the Colored Players Film Corporation of Philadelphia, in one of the early examples of race movies, in which an entirely black cast performed a feature film specifically for a black audience. The film was produced and written by David Starkman and was directed by Frank Peregini, both white. It was one of the later silent race movies.

Melodramas were the genre of choice for early 20th-century black filmmakers. This film emerged during a time of great breakthroughs in not only African American film but all art with the Harlem Renaissance when “a new sense of black consciousness emerged” likely after witnessing the bravery of African-American soldiers in World War I. This was a collaboration of a “black cast, white crew and interracial production team” produced by the conspicuously named “Colored Players” who were mostly white, in 1927. The Scar of Shame was one of three films produced by this company, founded in 1926 in Philadelphia.

== Plot ==
While practicing piano, Alvin looks out his window to see Louise being beaten by Spike, and he rescues her and then brings her back to Lucretia’s house. Lucretia, the owner of the boarding house where Alvin is residing, allows Louise to stay in return for chores around the house. Eddie meets with Spike, who has a black eye after the incident, and the former attempts to convince Spike to let Louise work as an entertainer for him. Spike doesn’t seem enthusiastic and shows regret for beating her, which he later credits to his alcoholism. Spike has some desire to allow his daughter to escape the kind of life he is stuck in, but he is unable to change any of his actions without being sucked into his old lifestyle by the alcohol supplied by Eddie.

Eddie learns the truth about the confrontation between Alvin and Spike during dinner at Lucretia’s. Later in the evening, Eddie forcefully attempts to bring Louise back to her “old pappy” but again Alvin intervenes. Drunk again from Eddie’s liquor, Spike continues to harass Louise who contemplates suicide if it continues. Alvin proposes to Louise after rescuing her again from the altercation, claiming that she wouldn’t need to worry about harm if they were married. After he defends Louise from Eddie at Lucretia’s house, Alvin exclaims “I’ll teach you to treat our women like that!”

Over more alcohol, Eddie schemes with Spike to distract Alvin with a fake telegram announcing his mother’s illness while they kidnap Louise. Alvin cannot take Louise with him because he hasn’t informed his mother of their marriage, which she would not have approved of because of her concern with class. Louise laments in life and finds a letter from Alvin’s mother urging him to marry another woman who is “part of our set,” referring to the same level in social stratification. She proceeds to rip the letter and then the marriage certificate.

Before they go through with the plan, Spike once again hesitates, remarking that she is better off away from people like him. Alvin comes back to confront Eddie after learning he had been tricked, and that his mother was visiting friends out of town. The scene is cut between Alvin's being in the car in the suburbs and Louise's tearing up mementos of their marriage. Eddie breaks into the house and entices Louise with far-fetched possibilities of becoming rich. As Alvin enters and guns are pulled, someone accidentally shoots Louise in the neck leaving a scar. Louise becomes involved with Eddie's gambling while Alvin is in prison. Eddie refers to Alvin as a “dicty sap”, which insults his ambitions to move up the rungs of the class system.

Alvin escapes prison by filing the bars in his cell and re-establishes himself as a music instructor with a false name. Alvin falls in love with his student, Alice, but “lives a daily lie” because he has hidden the secrets of his past. Louise is involved with Alice’s father so Alvin meets her after dropping an urgent note to Alice’s father. Alice’s father unknowingly pairs the two together for a dance. Later that night, Louise makes advances on Alvin, threatening to expose him, and he gives in for a moment but in a later scene Alvin rejects her and leaves. In distress, Louise kills herself after writing a revealing letter of repentance and apology. In it, she confesses that it was really Eddie who shot her neck, and he wouldn’t allow her to tell the truth during the trial.

Alvin feels compelled to inform Alice and her family about his secrets after hearing of Louise’s death, and they forgive him. The lament of Alice’s father mirrors the earlier foreword in blaming the environment and Louise’s lack of education, finishing with the statement: “our people have much to learn.”

== Cast ==
- Harry Henderson as Alvin Hillyard
- Norman Johnstone as Eddie Blake
- Ann Kennedy as Lucretia Green
- Lucia Lynn Moses as Louise Howard
- William E. Pettus as 'Spike' Howard
- Lawrence Chenault as Ralph Hathaway
- Pearl McCormack as Alice Hathaway
- Charles Gilpin as Lido Club Gambler (uncredited)
- Shingzie Howard as Louise's Maid (uncredited)

== Social insight and significance ==
This film depicts the struggles to advance from a poor environment. With the new emergence of a black bourgeois class, the film provides “a manual for those on the make,” embodied in Alvin Hilliard, but also “a caution to the weak willed who might be diverted from success by urban temptations.” For example, Louise is tempted by the opportunity of a “big break” as a cabaret singer, and her father is unable to resist alcohol.

The message is not so straightforward, and we see those who strive for more ending up hurting those they care about and deserting those less fortunate of the same race by the desire for success. The Scar of Shame provides insight into a “detailed anatomy of the conflicting strata of black urban life:” The “strivers” are in conflict with those who feel unable to leave their place in society, and the latter are resentful towards strivers who abandon them.

There is also the problem of by being assimilated into white culture, seen when Alvin seems to only compose “white music” on the piano, and losing track of one’s black heritage. Generally in the film, a darker skin tone is associated with lower class whereas those more close to white skin are higher class. The message is that it is not the skin that determines the character’s fate but rather their ambition. (However, it can be argued that Alice is slightly more white and portrayed in more alluring camera shots than Louise and Spike.)

A common theme throughout the film is the conflict between the higher and lower classes and their roles in the degradation of black women. It seems that the lower classes were thought to inflict sinful temptations, ill repute, and loose morals. Simultaneously the top class tried so hard to separate itself from the rest that it did not allow for those trapped below to advance.

== Library of Congress ==
The film has been preserved by the Library of Congress, but it is not on the National Film Registry preservation list. On all Library of Congress VHS/DVD prints, The Scar of Shame is accompanied by a 1923 short film, in which Noble Sissle sings jazz tunes while Eubie Blake plays the melody on the piano. The short film, titled Sissle and Blake by the Library of Congress, was filmed in the Lee DeForest Phonofilm sound-on-film process, and is one of the early examples of sound-on-film technology.
