= Marcus Garland =

1925 film by Oscar Micheaux

- Directed by: Oscar Micheaux
- Written by: Oscar Micheaux
- Produced by: Oscar Micheaux
- Release date: 1928
- Country: United States
- Language: English

Marcus Garland is a 1925 race film directed, written, produced and distributed by Oscar Micheaux. The film offers a harsh parody on the rise and fall of Marcus Garvey, the Black nationalist and pan-Africanist leader. Few details on the film’s production survive, and some sources place its release in 1928.

No print of the film is known to exist and it is presumed to be a lost film.
