= David Starkman =

American film producer

David Starkman (1885-c.1947) was an American film producer who helped found Colored Players Film Corporation, an independent silent film studio. He wrote and produced the film company's most famous film The Scar of Shame.

== Colored Players Film Corporation ==
In 1926, Starkman helped to found the Colored Players Film Corporation with Sherman H. "Uncle Dud" Dudley, a veteran of vaudevillian and race movies. Dudley and Starkman shared a common vision in which there was a black Hollywood free of the traditional black stereotypes.

With Starkman's theatre in Philadelphia as a base of operations, Colored Players Film Corporation developed with Dudley as the president of the company and Starkman in charge of the management, finances and operation of the production company. The Colored Players Film Corporation took the morals and ethics of Starkman and Dudley seriously and their films attempt to show the African Americans as successful, able to achieve middle class status, and apart from the typical stereotypes and minstrel films of the time. While only Dudley and the cast comprised the African Americans of the Colored Players Film Corporation, the collaboration between both the white and black staff was an integral part of the company. The interracial co-operation found in the company allowed for the success of the film The Scar of Shame.

== The Scar of Shame ==
The peak of the company's success came when it produced the film The Scar of Shame in 1929, a year before the company closed. Starkman produced the film and wrote it with the co-operation of the black staff in order to understand the social caste among African Americans living within the same neighborhood. The film primarily focuses on two protagonists, each from different levels of society. The main protagonist must choose whether or not to be with a woman from a lower caste of society or to leave her in order to keep with the plan his social status has pre-planned for him.

== The White Micheaux? ==
Sometimes called the "Oscar Micheaux" of the white independent film producers, Starkman helped to produce and write The Scar of Shame a famous film that the Colored Players Film Corporation produced and released before it was eventually absorbed and merged with another film production company. Starkman eventually went bankrupt due to the competition with other independent film companies and a lack of revenue brought in by the company's productions.

== Downfall ==
Although Starkman worked for his audience in order to enhance their experience in the theatre, he did not always have the money to fund his films. He eventually sold his theatre and then turned his wife's inheritance into cash. He intimidated local Philadelphia lawyers and merchants for capital. He ultimately wrote scripts and carried the "release prints to out of town play dates and [count] the house in person" (Smith 54). During production of his last film, The Scar of Shame, Starkman began to offer his own car for the film, put forward his sister's house as a shooting location and decorated the set with his own furniture. In the end, the financial pressure got the best of Starkman and after releasing The Scar of Shame he could no longer compete because of the arrival of sound film, ruining him and similar independent film companies. In a last effort to save the Colored Players Film Corporation, Starkman merged the company with one of his partner's, Sherman Dudley, but the company never took off.
