= Hallelujah (1929 film) =

1929 film by King Vidor

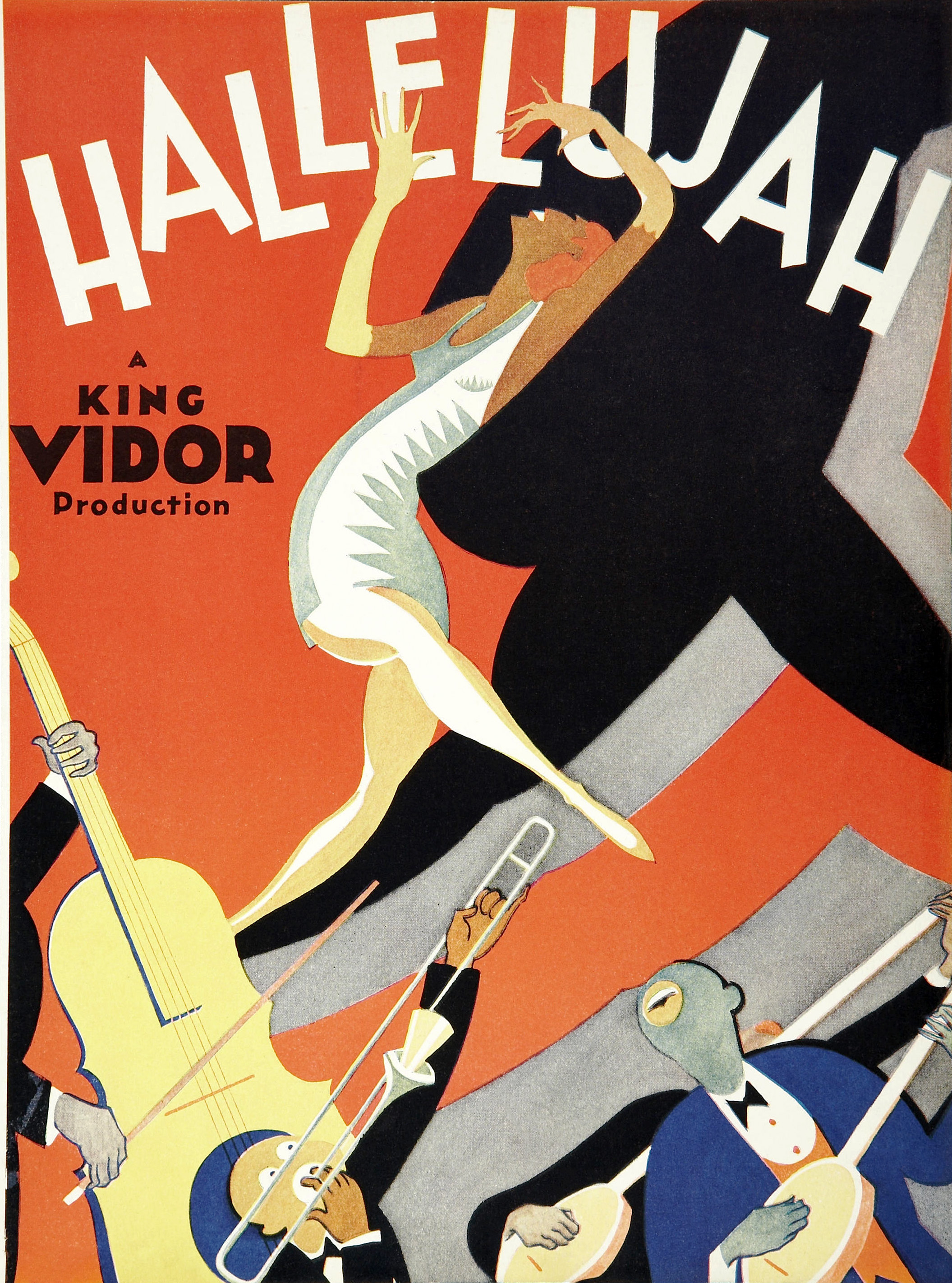
- Advertisement illustrated by Al Hirschfeld
- Directed by: King Vidor
- Written by: King Vidor (story); Wanda Tuchock (scenario); Richard Schayer (treatment); Ransom Rideout (dialogue)
- Starring: Daniel L. Haynes; Nina Mae McKinney; William Fountaine
- Cinematography: Gordon Avil
- Edited by: Hugh Wynn
- Music by: Irving Berlin
- Production company: A King Vidor Production
- Distributed by: Metro-Goldwyn-Mayer
- Release date: August 20, 1929
- Running time: 109 minutes (original release), 100 minutes (1939 re-issue, the version available on DVD)
- Country: United States
- Language: English

Hallelujah is a 1929 American pre-Code musical film directed by King Vidor, and starring Daniel L. Haynes and Nina Mae McKinney.

Filmed in Tennessee and Arkansas and chronicling the troubled quest of a sharecropper, Zeke Johnson (Haynes), and his relationship with the seductive Chick (McKinney), Hallelujah was one of the first films with an all-African American cast produced by a major studio. (Although frequently touted as Hollywood's first all-black cast musical, that distinction more properly belongs to Hearts in Dixie, which premiered several months earlier.) It was intended for a general audience and was considered so risky a venture by MGM that they required King Vidor to invest his own salary in the production. Vidor expressed an interest in "showing the Southern Negro as he is" and attempted to present a relatively non-stereotyped view of African-American life.

Hallelujah was King Vidor's first sound film, and combined sound recorded on location and sound recorded post-production in Hollywood. King Vidor was nominated for a Best Director Oscar for the film.

In 2008, Hallelujah was selected for preservation in the United States National Film Registry by the Library of Congress as being "culturally, historically, or aesthetically significant." In February 2020, the film was shown at the 70th Berlin International Film Festival, as part of a retrospective dedicated to King Vidor's career.

The film contains two scenes of "trucking": a contemporary dance craze where the participant makes movements backward and forward, but with no actual change of position, while moving the arms like a piston on a locomotive wheel.

Hallelujah entered the public domain on January 1, 2025.

== Plot ==
Hallelujah (1929)

Zeke Johnson is an African-American sharecropper who farms cotton for a living with his mother, Mammy; his father, Pappy; his brother, Spunk; Spunk's wife, Missy Rose; and Spunk's and Missy's three young boys in the American South. Pappy is an informal preacher in their broader community. One night during the harvest, two of the Johnsons' neighbors (who already have several children) come over to their farm to be married by Pappy. Zeke suddenly finds himself attracted to and tries to kiss his sister-in-law, but is rebuffed.

Zeke and Spunk take their family's crop into town and sell it at the gin, for which they receive $100. Zeke encounters and is drawn to Chick, a dancer, as she is entertaining some other sharecroppers. Chick takes Zeke to a saloon, where they dance. She entices him to double his earnings by playing craps against the wealthy Hot Shot, with whom she is secretly in cahoots. Hot Shot initially refuses to play and ridicules Zeke for his class background, but after he acquiesces, he uses a loaded die to win the game. Zeke notices this and confronts Hot Shot. In their ensuing gunfight, Spunk, who has entered the bar looking for Zeke, is shot and dies. At Spunk's emotional funeral, Pappy convinces Zeke that an angel is appearing to him with an offer of redemption. Zeke claims he also sees the angel and repents, saying he will become a preacher.

Some time later, Zeke—now using his full name, Zekiel—has become a well-known and wealthy traveling Baptist preacher. As he enters town on a donkey, he is spotted and ridiculed by Chick and Hot Shot. Zekiel angrily confronts the two, and they back down. Zekiel preaches a rousing revival, using the metaphor of a train journey to describe a sinner's lifelong—but evitable—path into hell. Chick attends his sermon, and while she resists at first, she eventually responds to Zekiel's altar call. Later, as Zekiel is baptizing her in a river alongside countless others, he is suddenly overcome with lust and carries her to his tent. Mammy intervenes and scolds Chick, while Zekiel snaps out of it and asks God for forgiveness.

Zekiel decides to marry Missy Rose, now his late brother's widow, to ward off further sexual temptations. Meanwhile, Chick is in her apartment preparing to attend Zekiel's night sermon. Hot Shot enters and confronts her, demanding she come back to him and claiming her conversion is feigned. As their argument turns physical, Chick beats Hot Shot viciously with a fire iron and leaves. At the sermon, the crowd enters into a religious frenzy. Chick comes into the church as Zekiel is preaching and successfully seduces him. They escape into the night, leaving Zekiel's family baffled.

Months later, Zeke has abandoned his ministry, works at a sawmill, and lives with Chick. She, however, has resumed her affair with Hot Shot. After coming home from work one day, Zeke suspects something is wrong but nods off. Immediately after Zeke falls asleep, Chick elopes with Hot Shot on his buggy. Zeke wakes up, shoots at them, and pursues them on foot. During the chase, one of Hot Shot's buggy's wheels falls off, throwing Chick off into the mud. She is mortally wounded and dies in Zeke's arms, but not before confessing she fears she will be damned. Zeke chases Hot Shot through a bayou and kills him.

Zeke is imprisoned for a time for his crime, but is eventually released on probation. He returns to his family, who welcome him back. Missy Rose declares she still loves him and kisses him.

== Cast ==
- Daniel L. Haynes as Zeke
- Nina Mae McKinney as Chick
- William Fountaine as Hot Shot
- Harry Gray as Parson
- Fanny Belle DeKnight as Mammy
- Everett McGarrity as Spunk
- Victoria Spivey as Missy Rose
- Milton Dickerson
- Robert Couch
- Walter Tait as Johnson Kids
- and Dixie Jubilee Singers

Uncredited (in order of appearance)
Sam McDaniel	Adam, one of the dice players
Matthew "Stymie" Beard	Child listening to Zeke's song
Eva Jessye	Dancehall singer
Blue Washington	Member of Zeke's congregation
Madame Sul-Te-Wan	Member of Zeke's congregation
Clarence Muse	Member of Zeke's congregation

== Production ==
Years before creating Hallelujah, King Vidor had longed to make a film employing an all-African American cast. He had floated the idea around for years but "the studio kept turning the idea down". Vidor was in Europe during 1928 promoting his film The Crowd, when he heard of talking motion pictures emerging in the United States. He wanted an all-African American cast to sing "Negro spirituals" after he had seen the success of it on Broadway. Vidor stated, "If stage plays with all Negro casts, and stories like those by Octavus Roy Cohen and others, could have such great success, why shouldn't the screen make a successful Negro play?" Vidor was able to convince Nicholas Schenck, who was the president of MGM at the time, to get the movie made by framing it more as a film that depicted African American's sexual deviance. Schenck put it simply to Vidor, "Well, if you think like that, I'll let you make a picture about whores". Vidor received the inspiration to create this film based on real incidents he witnessed as a child during his time at home in the south. He observed: "I used to watch the Negroes in the South, which was my home. I studied their music, and I used to wonder at the pent-up romance in them". Vidor began shooting in Arkansas, Memphis and Southern California at the MGM studios.

== Music ==
The film gives, in some sections, an authentic representation of black entertainment and religious music in the 1920s, though some of the sequences are Europeanized and over-arranged. In the outdoor revival meeting, with the preacher singing and acting out the "train to hell", is authentic in style until the end, where he launches into Irving Berlin's "Waiting at the End of the Road". Similarly, an outdoor group of workers near the beginning of the film are singing a choral arrangement of "Way Down Upon the Swanee River" (written by Stephen Foster, who never visited the South). According to Vidor himself in an interview given to The New York Times, "while Stephen Foster and others were inspired by hearing Negro songs on the levees, their music was not at all of the Negro type". He went on to add that Foster's music had "the distinct finish and technique of European music, possibly of German origin".

In a dancehall scene, Nina Mae McKinney performs Irving Berlin's "Swanee Shuffle". Although actually filmed in a New York studio using black actors, the sequence gives an accurate representation of a low-life black dance-hall—part of the roots of classic jazz. Most Hollywood films of the period sanitized black music.

Given the equipment available at the time, the film's soundtrack was a technical achievement, employing a much wider range of editing and mixing techniques than was generally used in "talkies" in this period.

== Reception ==
Exhibitors were worried white audiences would stay away due to the Black cast. They hosted two premieres, one at the Embassy Theatre in Midtown Manhattan, along Times Square, and the other at the Lafayette Theatre in Harlem, in northern Manhattan. The Black people who came to watch the film in Midtown Manhattan were forced to sit in the balcony. Hallelujah was commercially and critically successful. Photoplay praised the film for its depiction of African Americans and commented on the cast: "Every member of Vidor's cast is excellent. Although none of them ever worked before a camera or a microphone before, they give unstudied and remarkably spontaneous performances. That speaks a lot for Vidor's direction." Mordaunt Hall, in The New York Times, wrote approvingly of the all-Black cast, stating, "Hallelujah!, with its clever Negro cast, is one of the few talking pictures that is really a separate and distinct form of entertainment from a stage play". The combination of two groundbreaking aspects of the film, audible dialogue and an all-Black cast, set the movie apart from its contemporaries. In The New York Times, Mordaunt Hall wrote: "in portraying the peculiarly typical religious hysteria of the darkies and their gullibility, Mr. Vidor atones for any sloth in preceding scenes."

== Hallelujah and black stereotypes ==
Hallelujah was one of the early projects that gave African Americans significant roles in a movie, and though some contemporary film historians and archivists have said that it had "a freshness and truth that was not attained again for thirty years", a number of contemporary film historians and archivists agree that Hallelujah exhibits Vidor's paternalistic view of rural blacks that included racial stereotyping.

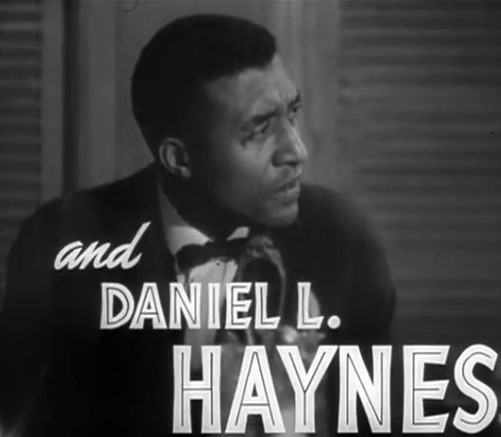
Daniel L. Haynes in Hallelujah (1929)

The emphasis these critics place on Vidor's white prejudice—all the more apparent today "given the enormous changes in ideology [and] sensibilities" since 1929—covers a spectrum of opinions. Vidor biographer John Baxter reports “a now-disconcerting [white] paternalism” that pervades Hallelujah, while film scholars Kristin Thompson and David Bordwell argue that “the film was as progressive as one could expect in the day.” Film critics Kerryn Sherrod and Jeff Stafford agree that “seen today, Hallelujah invites criticism for its stereotypes; blacks are depicted as either naive idealists or individuals ruled by their emotions.” Media critic Beretta Smith-Shomade considers Vidor's Hallelujah a template for racist and degrading portrayals of "Negras" in the movie industry in subsequent years.

Warner Bros., who owned the rights to Hallelujah before it entered the public domain, added a disclaimer at the opening of their archive edition:

The films you are about to see are a product of their time. They may reflect some of the prejudices that were common in American society, especially when it came to the treatment of racial and ethnic minorities. These depictions were wrong then and they are wrong today. These films are being presented as they were originally created, because to do otherwise would be the same as claiming these prejudices never existed. While the following certainly does not represent Warner Bros.' opinion in today's society, these images certainly do accurately reflect a part of our history that cannot and should not be ignored.

In Hallelujah, Vidor develops his characterizations of black rural workers with sensitivity and compassion. The “social consciousness” of the film and its sympathetic rendering of a tale of sexual passion, family affection, redemption and revenge performed by black actors earned enmity from the Deep South's white movie exhibitors and the “gripping melodrama” was banned entirely south of the Mason–Dixon line. Vidor's film crew was racially mixed, and included Harold Garrison (1901–1974) as an assistant director. Black female choral conductor Eva Jessye served as musical director on Hallelujah; she would later act as music director with George Gershwin on Porgy and Bess (1935).

The overall assessment of the film from film historians ranges from condemnation to qualified praise.

Museum of Modern Arts film archivist Charles Silver made this appraisal:

On one level, Hallelujah clearly reinforces the stereotypes of Blacks as childishly simple, lecherously promiscuous, fanatically superstitious, and shiftless [yet] Vidor could never be accused of the overt racial venom exhibited by Griffith in The Birth of a Nation...Is there, then, a defense for Hallelujah beyond its aesthetic importance? I think there is, and I think it lies in Vidor's personality as we know it from his films...Hallelujah can and should be accepted as the remarkable achievement it is.

Media critic Beretta Smith-Shomade asserts that from Vidor's Hallelujah, there issued forth racist characterizations of black rural figures, in particular “the black harlot”, establishing these stereotypes in both black and white motion pictures for decades.

"In these decades before television's arrival, negras appeared in films as servants, harlots, mammies, tragic mulattoes and religious zealots. The nation's carefree attitude during the 1920s forwarded the Harlem Renaissance and launched the Colored woman as featured artist on screen. Nina Mae McKinney distinguished herself as the first colored harlot. She played in King Vidor's Hallelujah sound film, as a Jezebel, of course, bamboozling a good man...Donald Bogle describes McKinney's character, Chick, as a 'black, exotic sex object, half woman, half child...She was a black woman out of control of her emotions, split in two by her loyalties and her own vulnerabilities. Implied throughout the battle with self was the tragic mulatto theme; the white half of her represented the spiritual, the black half the animalistic.' [These] screen stereotypes presented themselves in both mainstream and early black cinema. They stood as Negras' predominant roles."

Film critic Kristin Thompson registers an objection to Warner Bros.' disclaimer attached to its Hallelujah archive edition:

Unfortunately the company has chosen to put a boilerplate warning at the beginning that essentially brands Hallelujah as a racist film...I don't think this description fits Hallelujah, but it certainly sets the viewer up to interpret the film as merely a regrettable document of a dark period of US history. Warner Bros. demeans the work of the filmmakers, including the African-American ones. The actors seem to have been proud of their accomplishment, as well they should be.

=== Nina Mae McKinney as Hallelujah's "harlot" ===
Critic Donald Bogle identifies McKinney as the silver screens' “first black whore”, with respect to the role Vidor had fashioned for her in Hallelujah.

Nina Mae McKinney, coming from the recent stage production of Blackbirds of 1928 portrayed Chick, the object of Zeke's desire and victim in the films' tragic denouement. Theater critic Richard Watts Jr., a contemporary of McKinney, described her as “one of the most beautiful women of our time” She was dubbed “the Black Garbo” when touring Europe in the 1930s. Vidor considered her performance central to the success of Hallelujah.

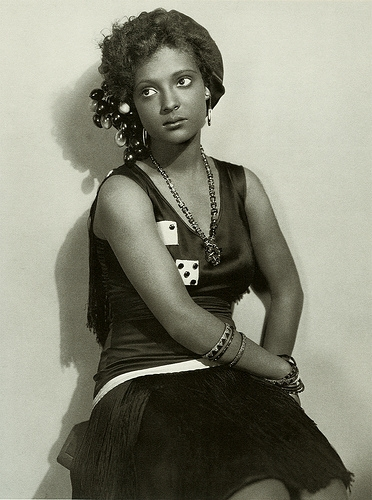
Nina Mae McKinney

Though McKinney was the first to portray a black prostitute, this “archetypal narrative” goes back as far as 1900, when only white female actors played "the fallen woman" who turn to prostitution. Many of these films appeared in the silent era with narratives deploring the "plight of women who have fallen on hard times due to unemployment, unwanted pregnancies, divorce, childhood deprivation or simply because they have been 'born on the wrong side of the track'." Throughout the silent film era, the cautionary tales of woman turning to prostitution had been uniformly presented as shameful and degrading. These Victorian-inspired scenarios, however, were declining at the time of Hallelujah's production, as they were in the industrialized countries globally. As a result "the concept of a loss of chastity leading inexorably to prostitution became no longer tenable."

The formula that Vidor used for McKinney's Chick was modeled after conventional scenarios depicting white prostitutes in these earlier films: narratives that were already in decline. Film and social critic Russel Campbell describes the formula:

The prostitute “is likely to die at the end of the film, through suicide, illness, accident, murder or execution (the conventions of Victorian art and literature...ordained that 'a woman's fall ends in death'). Otherwise she may survive and save her soul through an act of redemption; frequently she is paired off with a good man whose upright character serves to cancel out the poor impression of the male sex given earlier in the film…for others, death awaits.

McKinney's exuberant and highly seductive portrayal of Chick anticipates the change in perception towards female sexual expression. Her performance influenced both black and white actresses with her version of a "rough nightlife heroine", among them Jean Harlow, a white film star who also engagingly portrayed brothel whores and prostitutes. According to film historian Jean-Marie Lecomte, "prostitutes, ladies of leisure, street walkers, and tramps, as the borderline women of Depression era America, flourished on the Hollywood screen" in the Pre-Code Hollywood following Hallelujah's release.

While acknowledging Hallelujah's racial stereotyping, critics Kerryn Sherrod and Jeff Stafford report that "the film set a high standard for all subsequent all-black musicals and still stands as an excellent showcase for the talents of Ms. McKinney and company."

== See also ==
- List of early sound feature films (1926–1929)
