= Black Film Review =

Publication on African Diaspora cinema (1984–1995)

- Categories: Film
- Frequency: quarterly
- Founder: David Nicholson
- First issue: 1984
- Final issue: 1995
- Country: United States
- Based in: Washington, D.C.
- Language: English

Black Film Review (BFR) was an international publication focusing on films and filmmakers from the African diaspora, with a focus on independent cinema. BFR was published from 1984 to 1995. Its headquarters was in Washington, D.C.

== History ==
Founded by David Nicholson in 1984, the first undated issue of the publication was a one-page newsletter Nicholson produced on his PC, photocopied, and sent to several friends. The magazine was published by Sojourner Productions on a quarterly basis.

Three more home-made issues followed, including a 24-page issue that included the magazine's first coverage of the Festival of Pan African Cinema Ouagadougu (FESPACO), an interview with Hollywood star Denzel Washington, and poetry by Amiri Baraka. In 1985, Nicholson entered into a co-publishing agreement with Anthony Gittens, director of the Black Film Institute of the University of the District of Columbia. With funding from the National Endowment for the Arts, the magazine was published in a redesigned format on glossy paper with photographs.

== Editorship ==
Though Nicholson joined the staff of The Washington Post Book World as an editor and book reviewer in 1986, he continued to produce the magazine as editor and publisher for another year before turning over responsibility for it to Jacquie Jones. Under Jones, the publication expanded its coverage of Panafrican film and filmmakers, gaining significant acclaim. It was used as a text at many film schools within the United States and abroad. Contributors included film scholars Donald Bogle, Phyllis Klotman, Pat Aufderheide, Manthia Diawara, and Clyde Taylor.

During its last two years of publication, BFR was co-published by Eric Easter, and edited by historian Leasa Farrar Frazer.
