= Deceit (1923 film) =

1923 film by Oscar Micheaux

- Directed by: Oscar Micheaux
- Starring: Evelyn Preer; William Fountaine; Norman Johnstone; A. B. DeComathiere; Cleo Desmond
- Distributed by: Micheaux Film Corporation
- Release date: 1923
- Country: United States
- Language: Silent (English intertitles)

Deceit (sometimes referred to as The Deceit) is a 1923 American silent black-and-white film. It is a conventional melodrama directed by Oscar Micheaux. Like many of Micheaux's films, Deceit casts clerics in a negative light.

The 1922 film The Hypocrite was shown within Deceit as a film within a film.

== Cast ==
- Evelyn Preer – Doris Rutledge / Evelyn Bently
- William Fountaine – unknown role
- Norman Johnstone – Alfred DuBois / Gregory Wainwright
- A. B. DeComathiere – Reverend Bently
- Cleo Desmond – Charlotte Chesbro
- Louis De Bulger – Mr. Chesbro
- Mabel Young – Mrs. Levine
- Cornelius Watkins – Gregory Wainwright, as a child
- Mrs. Irvin C. Miller – Mrs. Wainwright
- Ira O. McGowan – Mr. Wainwright

== Production ==
Filming began on June 6, 1921 at Estee Studio, New York City. Although the film was shot in 1921, it was not released until 1923.

== Censorship ==
Before Deceit could be exhibited in Kansas, the state censorship board required the removal of several scenes and intertitles. Reel 1, three scenes of girl smoking. Reel 5, the fight scene and the closeup of pulling hair and biting fingers. Also removed were the reel 5 titles "You know dearie, when you want to mess something up, put a negro into it and especially a preacher." and "What profit it ye, if you gain riches and lose Jesus."

== Preservation ==
With no holdings located in archives, Deceit is considered a lost film.
