= Shingzie Howard =

American actress

Elcors "Shingzie" Howard
- Occupation(s): Actress, Teacher
- Known for: Appearing in several Oscar Michaux films and working for the Colored Players Film Corporation

Elcors "Shingzie" Howard was an actress in the U.S. She appeared in several Oscar Michaux films. She also worked for the Colored Players Film Corporation.

After she married she became known as Shingzie Howard McClane. She retired from filmmaking and became a teacher. She appeared in the documentary Midnight Ramble episode of American Experience about early African American films in 1994.

== Filmography ==
- The Virgin of Seminole (1922)
- Jasper Landry's Will (1922)
- The Dungeon (1922) as Myrtle Downing
- A Son of Satan (1924)
- The House Behind the Cedars (1927) as Rena
- The Prince of His Race (1926)
- Children of Fate (1928)

== See also ==
- Evelyn Preer
