= Deanna Michaux =

American journalist

Deanna Michaux (born April 8, 1970 in North Carolina) is a nationally syndicated columnist, author and radio host. Michaux is the author of the advice column and radio show "Ask Deanna!". She appeared in the 2006 race relations documentary Black.White. with Ice Cube on the F/X channel. She is a direct descendant of Oscar Micheaux, one of the first African American playwrights who also has a star on the Hollywood Walk of Fame.
