= The Symbol of the Unconquered =

1920 film by Oscar Micheaux

The Symbol of the Unconquered (The Wilderness Trail)
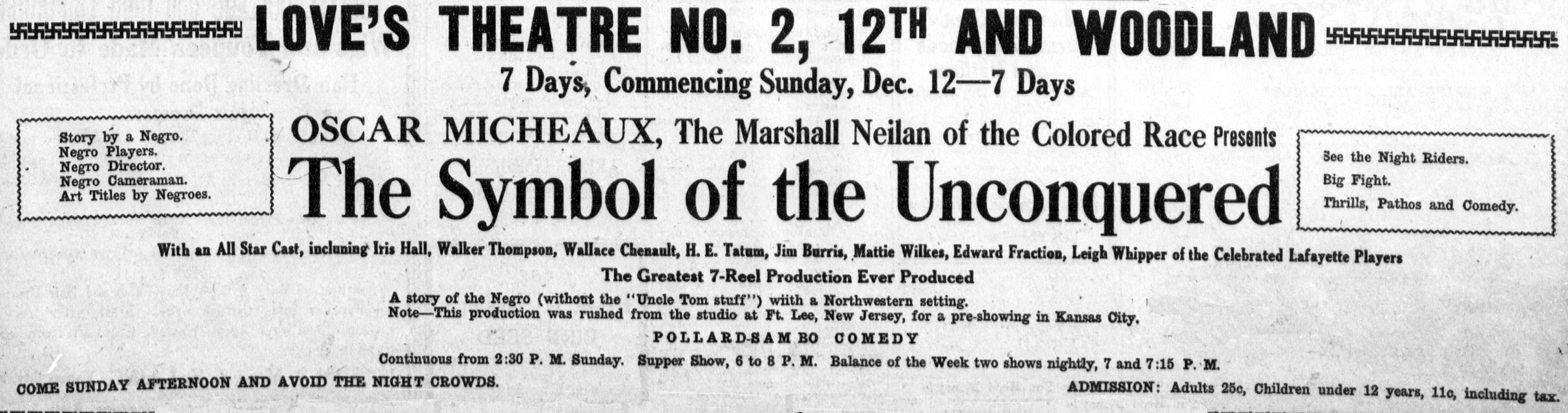
- Contemporary newspaper advertisement.
- Directed by: Oscar Micheaux
- Written by: Oscar Micheaux
- Produced by: Oscar Micheaux
- Starring: Iris Hall
- Release date: November 29, 1920
- Running time: 54 minutes; 7 reels (silentera has it at 8 reels, IMDb says 5 reels)
- Country: United States
- Language: Silent (English intertitles)

The Symbol of the Unconquered (also known as The Wilderness Trail) is a 1920 silent "race film" drama produced, written and directed by Oscar Micheaux. Premiering only a few years after The Birth of a Nation, the film was advertised for its negative depiction of the Ku Klux Klan. It is Micheaux's fourth feature-length film and, along with Within Our Gates, is among his early surviving works.

The film is based on the way perceptions of race shape human relationships. It contrasts the behavior of two white-passing characters towards other members of their race. Heroine Eve Mason (Iris Hall) moves to a frontier town and befriends her black neighbors, while the villainous Jefferson Driscoll scorns the company of all other black people, even rejecting his own mother. A romance grows between Eve and young black prospector Hugh Van Allen, but he believes Eve is white and hides his feelings from her. When Driscoll and friends enlist the KKK to run Van Allen off his oil-rich land, Eve saves the day by riding into town for help. Two years later, Van Allen is a successful oil king; Eve delivers a letter revealing her black ancestry, and the two are able to declare their love for each other at last.

The Symbol of the Unconquered was made at Fort Lee, New Jersey, and released by Micheaux on November 29, 1920. A print of the film is extant at the Museum of Modern Art in New York.

== Plot ==
Eve Mason is a "white-skinned" African American who inherits a large amount of land after the death of her grandfather Dick Mason, an old prospector. She leaves her hometown of Selma, Alabama for the Northwest to settle in a place called Oristown.

Upon arrival she decides to stay in the Driscoll Hotel but its owner, Jefferson Driscoll, a self-hating light-skinned black man, is passing as white and scorns the company of other African Americans. Suspecting Eve is of black heritage by studying her eyes, Driscoll forces her to sleep outside in his barn. There she sees another black man, Abe, that Driscoll has sent to stay for the night. Though Abe is a comical and harmless figure, his facial grimaces (from being cold and wet) scare an already exhausted Eve who runs off into the woods as Driscoll laughs uproariously at her distress.

In the morning, she meets a kind, young prospector named Hugh Van Allen, who happens to be her new neighbor. Van Allen is also African American, but doesn't realize that Eve is too. They become fast friends, and Van Allen offers Eve a ride to her new house. When they get there, Van Allen continues to show kindness and helps Eve get settled into her little cabin. Before leaving, he gives Eve a gun and tells her to shoot it twice if she's ever in trouble. That way he will know to come right over.

The Symbol of the Unconquered

On the other side of town, August Barr and Tugi, a couple of criminals, are meeting with Barr's brother-in-law Peter Kaden. They tell Kaden that they need a couple of important documents, most of which he can find at Dick Mason's house and force him to go and retrieve the documents himself. He goes there later that night and peeks his head in the window, startling Eve so much that her scream is heard by Van Allen. Kaden is able to run away before being discovered by Van Allen, who calms Eve down and even offers to keep watch outside for the rest of the night.

The next day Driscoll, who has quit the hotel business, sells two stolen horses to Van Allen. Before long Van Allen is approached by the horses’ real owner and learns of Driscoll's true nature. He confronts Driscoll at the local saloon where the two men have a physical altercation, which ends with Van Allen as the winner and Driscoll proclaiming that he will have his revenge. Later Driscoll's mother, whose dark features Driscoll despises, comes to town and runs into Eve, who befriends the woman despite still having ill feelings towards her son.

At the post office Driscoll picks up a letter meant for Van Allen that was accidentally dropped by the mail man. After reading it he learns that Van Allen's land has incredible value and shows the information to Barr and Tugi. They enlist the help of Bill Stanton, a Ku Klux Klan member, and continually leave threatening notes outside of Van Allen's tent in order to get him to sell. This doesn't work however and Bill Stanton decides to ride onto the land one night with other Klan members. Their attack fails thanks to some help from other members of the community, specifically a colored man with a brick, and afterwards Van Allen finally learns that the reason his land is so sought after is because of the abundance of oil fields.

Two years go by and Van Allen has become one of the oil kings, running his own company. Eve drops by to deliver a letter from The Committee for the Defense of the Colored Race that reveals Eve's black parentage. The film ends with Van Allen learning the truth and the two of them declaring their love for each other.

== Cast ==
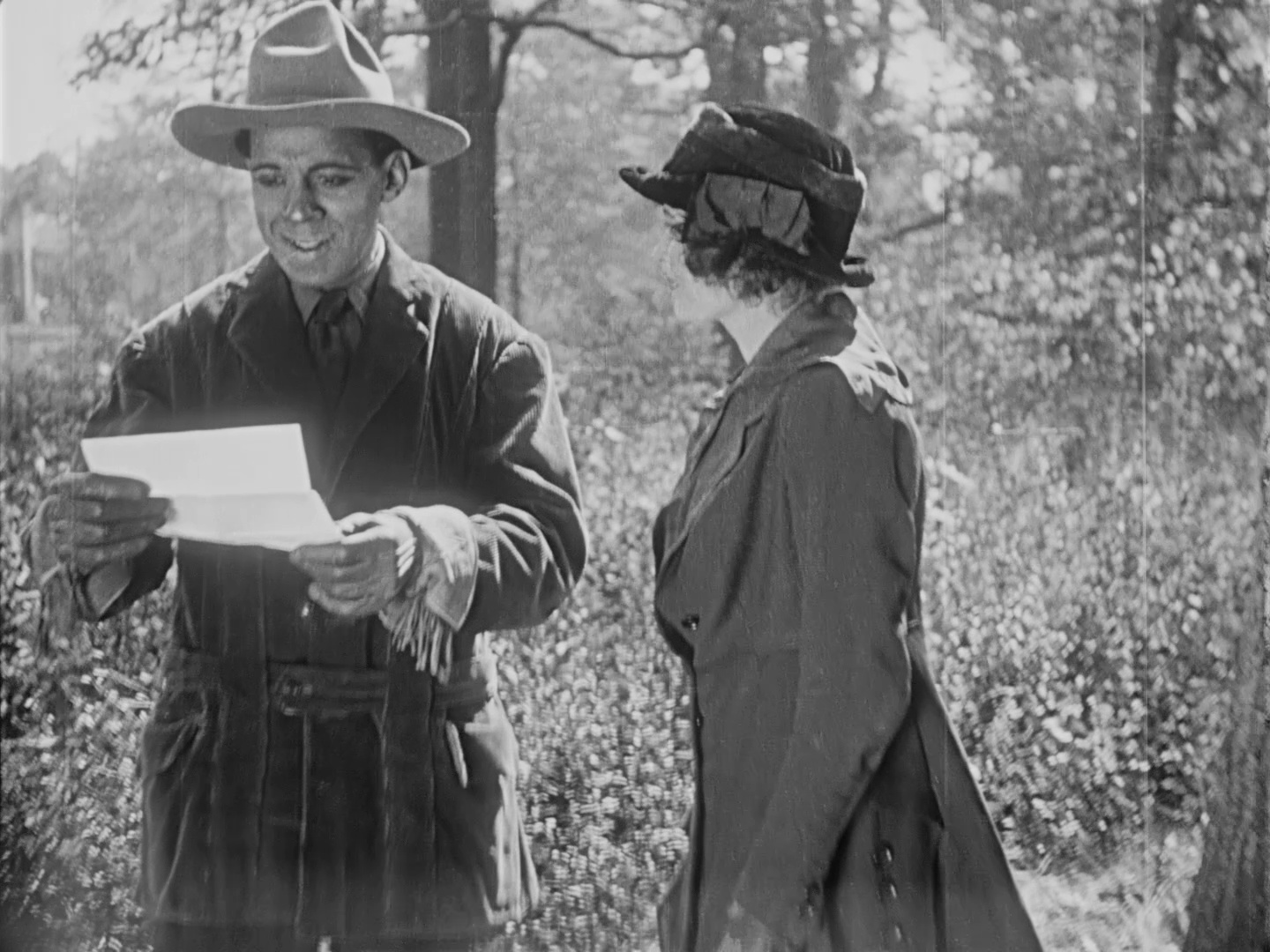
Scene from the film.

- Iris Hall as Eve Mason
- Walker Thompson as Hugh Van Allen
- Lawrence Chenault as Jefferson Driscoll
- Mattie Wilkes as Mother Driscoll
- Louis Dean as August Barr
- Leigh Whipper as Tugi, Indian Fakir
- E. G. Tatum as Abraham
- George Catlin as Dick Mason
- Edward Fraction as Peter Kaden
