= Emmett Anthony =

Vaudeville comedian

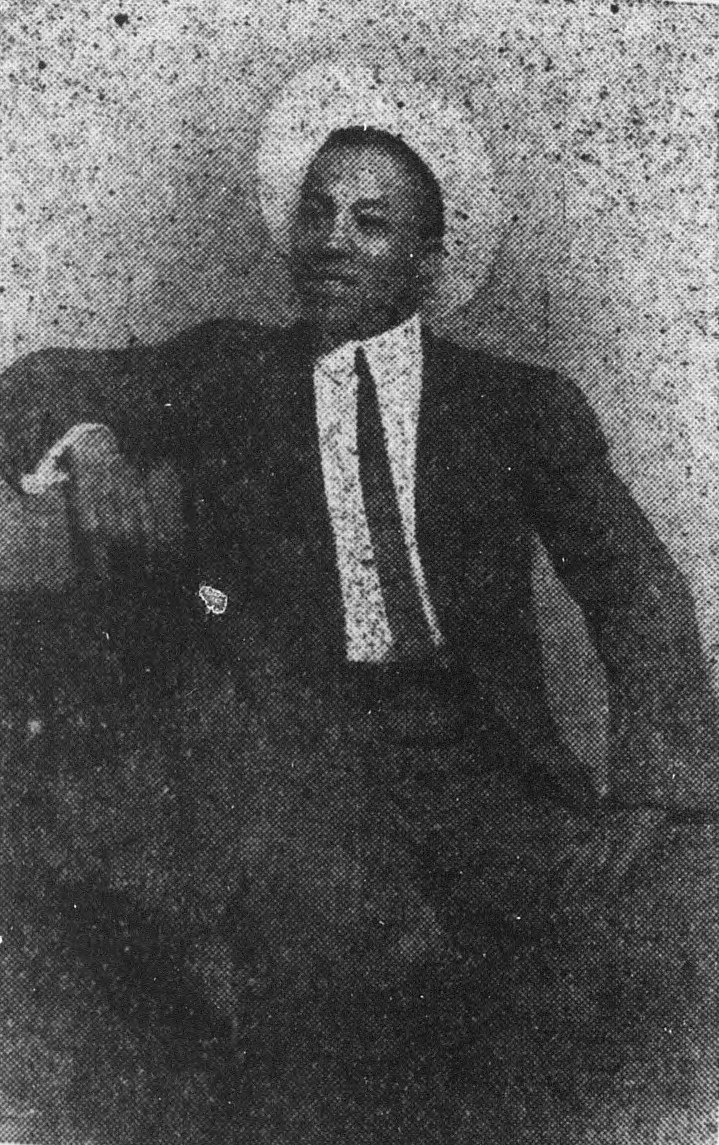
Emmett Anthony, comedian

Emmett "Gang" Anthony (ca. 1889–1931) was an American vaudeville comedian who appeared on stage in various revues and shows. In December 1915 he arrived in New Orleans on the S.S. Brunswick to perform at the Iroquis Theater. He was also in the film A Son of Satan and was part of Blackville Corporation's 1915 touring revival, The Mayor of Jimtown touring show in 1923, and Harlem Darlings revue in 1929. He featured as a regular at the Crescent Theatre in 1913. He was in Liza in 1923. He received a favorable assessment for his part in Put and Take.

A June 15, 1912 review in the Indianapolis Freeman described him as excellent and noted his unique and interesting singing.

He has also been characterized as a yodeler-comedian. Along with Charles Anderson of Birmingham he was one of the premier African American yodelers. Beulah Henderson of New Orleans was also a yodeler. He drew praise for his yodeling and comedy in a 1921 revue with Irvin Miller.

He died in a Philadelphia hotel in September 1931, aged 43. Variety reported he died from heart failure following acute indigestion, but that some early stories claimed he died from stabbing. The Chicago Whip stated he had been killed by a lover. Shortly after his death, his estranged wife, actress Agnes Anthony, was shot to death in New Orleans. They had a son.
