= The Easiest Way (1917 film) =

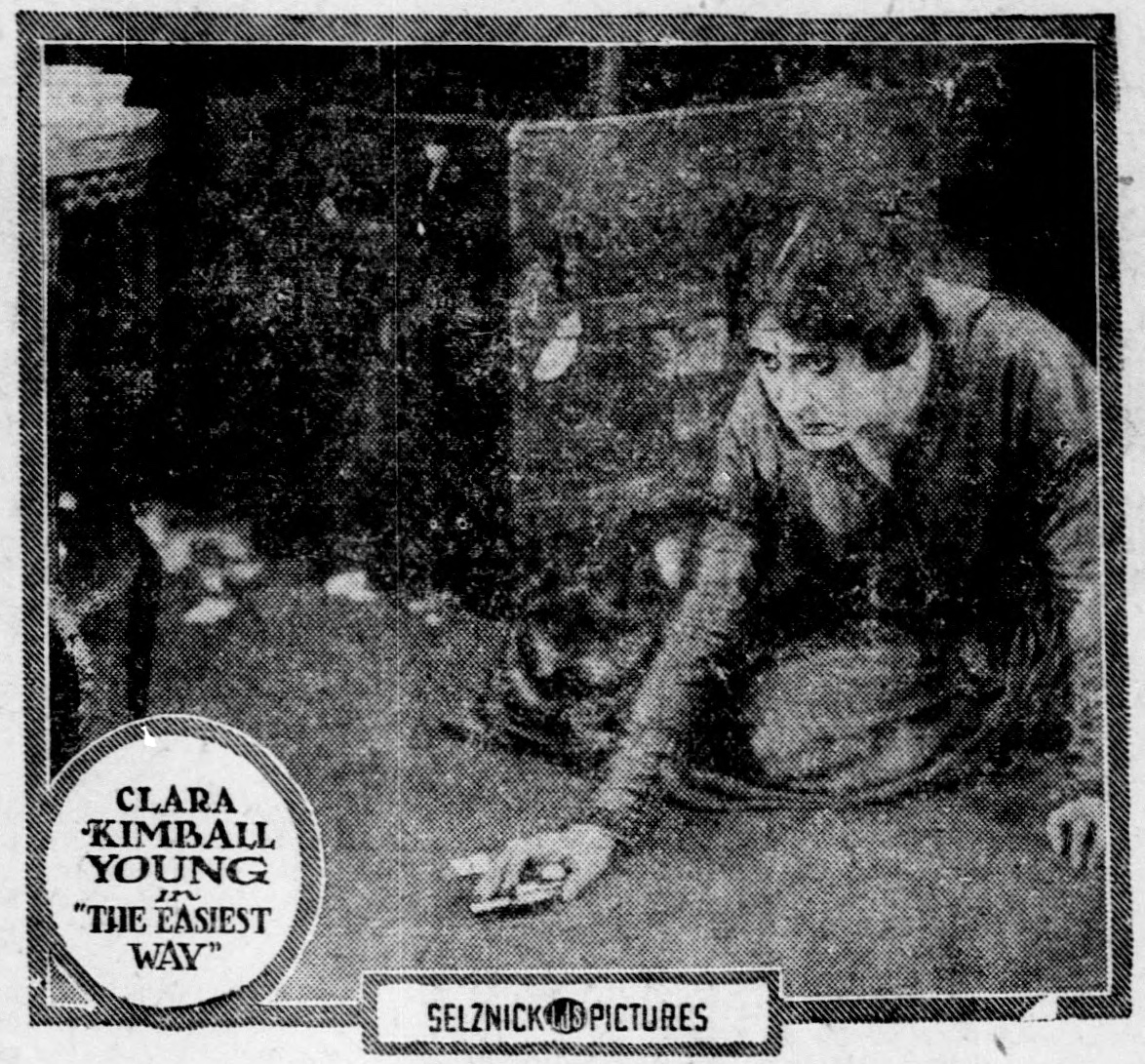
- Contemporary publicity photo
- Directed by: Albert Capellani
- Written by: Albert Capellani and Frederick Chapin
- Based on: The Easiest Way; 1909 play by Eugene Walter
- Produced by: Clara Kimball Young Company
- Starring: Clara Kimball Young
- Cinematography: Jacques Monteran; Hal Young
- Distributed by: Selznick Distributing Corporation
- Release date: April 1917
- Running time: 7 reels
- Country: United States
- Languages: Silent (English intertitles)

The Easiest Way is a 1917 American silent film starring Clara Kimball Young and directed by Albert Capellani. It is based on a 1909 play, The Easiest Way by Eugene Walter, staged by David Belasco and starred Frances Starr as Laura Murdock. Belasco and Starr revived the play in 1921. It is not known whether the film currently survives.

Actor Joseph Kilgour reprises his role as Brockton from the Broadway play.

== Plot summary ==
Laura Murdock is a young impoverished woman who dreams of becoming actress. After her husband, a drunkard, is killed by a fall, she travels to New York.

In the city, wealthy broker Willard Brorckton has been asked to finance a production and refused. However, he meets Laura, and agrees to finance the film in exchange for Laura being given a starring role. Brockton demands that Laura repay him for getting her the part, but she initially pushes back.

The following summer, Laura goes to Denver for a stock engagement, where she falls in love with John Madison, a newspaper writer. He cannot afford to marry, and Brockton, who comes west to take Laura back with him, derides the idea of him marrying her. However, Laura promises to wait, and Brockton promises Madison that if Laura returns to him, he will let Madison know.

Laura returns to New York, and Brockton's influence prevents her from getting an engagement. She runs out of money and resources, and does not hear from Madison, leaving her to turn to her only remaining option, which is returning to Brockton.

Brockton dictates a letter to Madison which Laura promises to mail, but she burns it instead. Meanwhile, Madison finds gold, and finally having enough money to marry Laura, hurries to New York. Laura confesses that she burnt the letter Brockton had promised to send, and Madison, upset, rejects her.

Deserted by both men, Laura becomes desperate, and tries to fling herself into the excesses of Broadway nightlife. However, she is disgusted by the indulgences of those around her, and attempts to end her life by drowning herself in the river. Her attempt is unsuccessful, and she is rescued and taken to a hospital. Madison is notified, and learns of her fight to stay true to him despite everything that happened. He hurries to her side just in time to let her know that he understands and forgives her, and she dies in his arms.

== Production ==
Portions of the film depicting Colorado Springs were filmed in and around Skyland Resort in what is now Shenandoah National Park.

== Cast ==
- Clara Kimball Young - Laura Murdock
- Louise Bates - Elfie St. Clair
- Joseph Kilgour - Willard Brockton
- Rockliffe Fellowes - John Madison
- Cleo Desmond - Annie
- George Stevens - Jim Weston
- Frank Kingdon - Burgess
- Mae Hopkins - Nellie De Vere
- Walter McEwen - Jerry
