= A Son of Satan =

1924 film by Oscar Micheaux

- Directed by: Oscar Micheaux
- Written by: Oscar Micheaux
- Produced by: Oscar Micheaux
- Starring: Andrew Bishop; Lawrence Chenault; Shingzie Howard; Edna Morton
- Release date: September 18, 1924
- Country: United States

A Son of Satan is a 1924 silent race film directed, written, produced and distributed by Oscar Micheaux. The film follows the misadventures of a man who accepted a bet to spend a night in a haunted house. Micheaux shot the film in The Bronx, New York, and Roanoke, Virginia.

== Cast ==
- Andrew S. Bishop
- Lawrence Chenault
- Emmett Anthony
- Edna Morton
- Monte Hawley
- Shingzie Howard
- Ida Anderson
- E. G. Tatum
- Dink Stewart
- W. B. F. Crowell
- Olivia Sewall
- Mildred Smallwood
- Blanche Thompson
- Margaret Brown
- Professor Hosay

Some of the original cast from the hit Broadway musicals Shuffle Along and Runnin' Wild appear in the movie, including Aubrey Lyles and F. E. Miller, Adelaide Hall, Arthur Cooper, Mildred Baker, Ina Duncan, and Arthur Porter.

== Production ==
Micheaux Film Corporation production; distributed by Micheaux Film Corporation. / Produced by Oscar Micheaux. Scenario by Oscar Micheaux. / Standard 35mm spherical 1.37:1 format. / Working title: The Ghost of Tolston’s Manor. The production began shooting on March 26, 1923, in the Bronx, New York. Some location photography was taken in Roanoke, Virginia, and in Clason’s Point, New York. Approximately 20,000 feet of film was shot during production. The film was granted a New York State exhibition license on September 18, 1924.

== Censorship ==
A Son of Satan ran into distribution problems when state censorship boards rejected the film based on its contents. New York censors objected to the film’s depiction of violence, particularly against women and animals (a cat is killed onscreen in one scene, a Ku Klux Klan leader is slain, and a man chokes his wife to death), while Virginia censors complained the film’s references to miscegenation would "prove offensive to Southern ladies". In at least one state the film was banned for its title alone.

== Lost film ==
No print of the film is known to exist and it is presumed to be a lost film.
