= Clyde Taylor =

American film scholar, writer, and cultural critic (1931–2024)

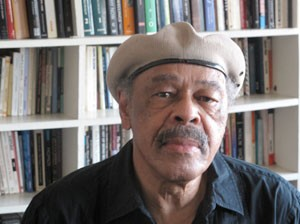
- Born: July 3, 1931; Boston, Massachusetts, U.S.
- Died: January 24, 2024 (aged 92); Los Angeles, California, U.S.
- Occupations: Film scholar, writer, and cultural critic
- Children: 2

Clyde Russell Taylor (July 3, 1931 – January 24, 2024) was an American film scholar, writer and cultural critic who made contributions to the fields of cinema studies and African American studies. He was an emeritus professor at New York University. His scholarship and commentary often focused on Black film and culture.

== Career ==
Clyde Taylor wrote and published numerous scholarly articles, essays, and reviews. Taylor is best known for coining the term 'L.A. Rebellion', which refers to the group of African American filmmakers who emerged from the UCLA School of Theater, Film and Television in the 1970s. This movement was characterized by its emphasis on social realism and its rejection of Hollywood conventions.

Clyde held faculty positions at UC Berkeley, Stanford University, and Mills College, then returned to Boston for a position in the Department of English at Tufts University. After over a decade at Tufts University, Taylor accepted a position at New York University. He remained at NYU in the Gallatin School of Individualized Study and the Department of Africana Studies, until he retired, professor emeritus in 2008.

Taylor was the author of the book, The Mask of Art: Breaking the Aesthetic Contract – Film and Literature (Indiana University Press, 1998), which was awarded the PEN Oakland/Josephine Miles Literary Award in 1999. He co-wrote the screenplay for Midnight Ramble, a seminal feature documentary about the work and legacy of Oscar Micheaux released by American Experience on PBS in 1995. He was a frequent contributor to journals such as Black Film Review and Jump Cut.

Other accolades for Taylor included induction into the National Literary Hall of Fame for Writers of African Descent, by the Gwendolyn Brooks Cultural Center; the 1982 Callaloo Creative Writing Award for Non-Fiction Prose, an "Indie" Award for critical writing on cinema of people of color from the Association of Independent Video and Film (AIVF); and the Richard Wright Award for Literacy Criticism from Black World. He was the recipient of a Fulbright Fellowship, as well as Fellowships from the Rockefeller Foundation (Whitney Scholar-in-Residency Fellowship), the Ford Foundation Fellowship (DuBois Institute, Harvard University), the Rockefeller Foundation (Fellowship, NYU Center for Culture, Media and History), as well as two Fellowships from the National Endowment for the Humanities.

== Early life ==
Clyde Taylor was born in Boston, Massachusetts on July 3, 1931, the youngest of eight children, to E. Alice Taylor and Frank Taylor. He graduated from The English High School and later from Howard University.

Once at Howard University, Clyde studied in the Department of English in collegial engagement with fellow students like Amiri Baraka and Toni Morrison. At Howard he studied under professors such as Alain LeRoy Locke. Taylor earned both Bachelor's and master's degrees in English.

After graduation, Taylor enlisted in the United States Air Force as an intelligence officer, earning the rank of First Lieutenant. He was honorably discharged and recognized with a National Defense Service Medal. He continued his studies, pursuing a graduate degree in English at Wayne State University in Detroit, MI. He wrote his dissertation on the works of William Blake and the Ideology of Art, and earned a Ph.D.

== Personal life ==
While at Wayne State University, he met student JoAnn Spencer from Detroit, pursuing her degree in education. They married in June 1960 in Detroit and had two children, daughters Shelley Zinzi Taylor and Rahdi Taylor. Their marriage dissolved in 1970. In 1972, Taylor moved to the San Francisco Bay Area, where he went on to marry Martella Wilson, a young leader in the world of philanthropy and social impact charities. Together they co-founded and led the African Film Society, which hosted screenings of cinema from Western Africa and discussions of their aesthetic and social vision. In the mid 90s, the couple dissolved the marriage but continued living and working in Boston until Taylor moved to Manhattan for a position at New York University in 1998.

Taylor died on January 24, 2024, at the age of 92.
