= When Men Betray (1929 film) =

1929 film

- Directed by: Oscar Micheaux
- Written by: Oscar Micheaux
- Produced by: Oscar Micheaux
- Release date: 1929
- Country: United States
- Language: English

When Men Betray is a 1929 American race film directed, written, produced and distributed by Oscar Micheaux. It was distributed on a state's rights basis.

The film details the plight of a young woman who falls in love and marries a glib con artist who abandons her without money on their wedding night.

== Cast ==
- Katherine Noisette
- William A. Clayton Jr.
- Lorenzo Tucker

== Preservation ==
No print of When Men Betray is known to exist and it is presumed to be a lost film.
