= Uncle Jasper's Will =

1922 film by Oscar Micheaux

- Directed by: Oscar Micheaux
- Written by: Oscar Micheaux
- Produced by: Oscar Micheaux
- Release date: 1922
- Country: USA
- Language: English (silent)

Uncle Jasper's Will (also released as Jasper Landry's Will) is a 1922 race film directed, produced and written by Oscar Micheaux. The film is a drama about the contents of a last will and testament left behind by an African-American sharecropper who was lynched after being falsely accused of the murder of a white plantation owner. The film was intended as a sequel to Micheaux’s landmark feature Within Our Gates (1920).

== Cast ==
- William Fountaine
- Shingzie Howard
- Alma Sewell
- Harry Henderson

== See also ==
- List of lost films
