= The Dungeon (1922 film) =

1922 film by Oscar Micheaux

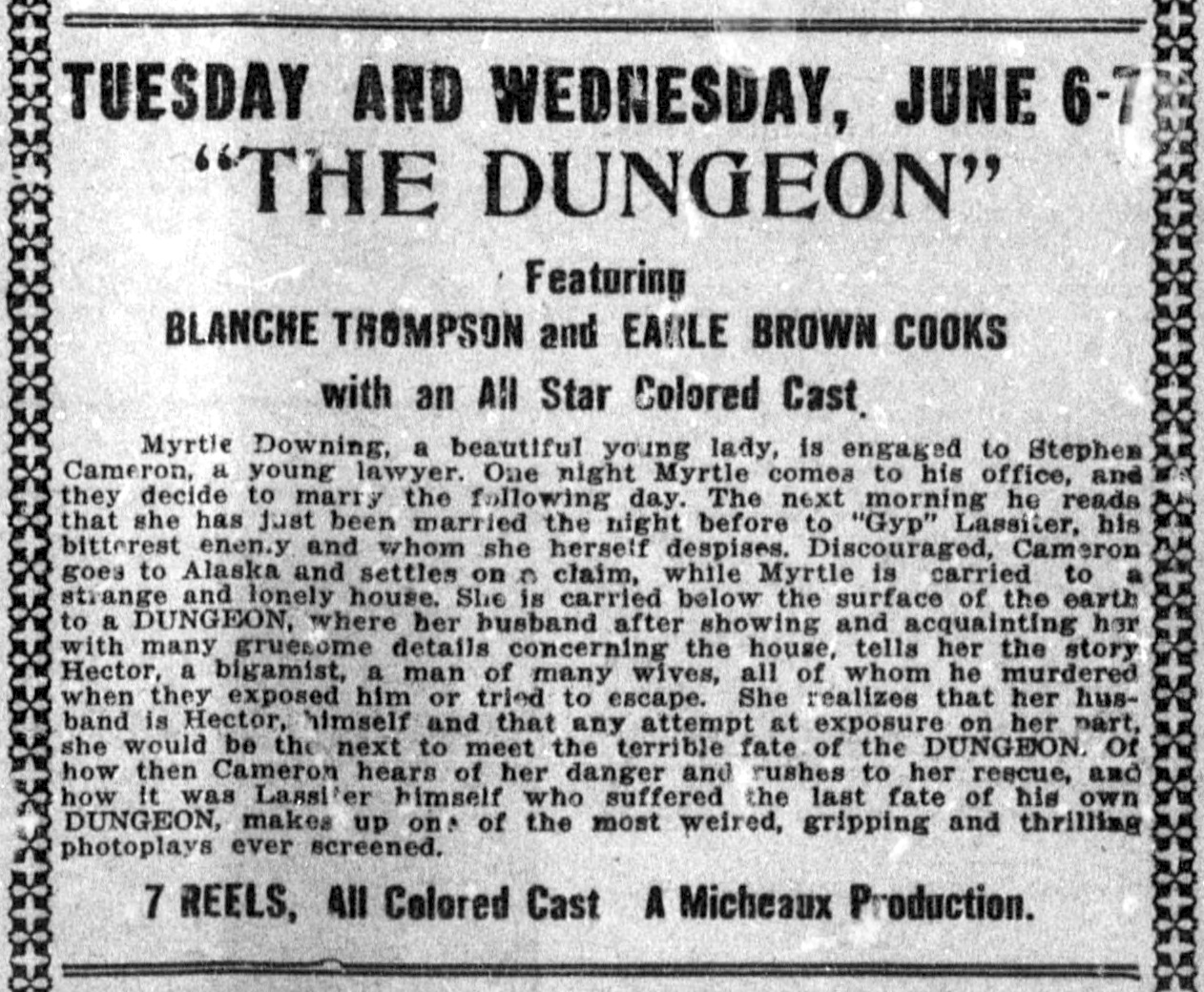
- Contemporary newspaper advertisement for the film
- Directed by: Oscar Micheaux
- Written by: Oscar Micheaux
- Produced by: Oscar Micheaux
- Release date: 1922
- Country: United States
- Language: Silent

The Dungeon is a 1922 race film directed, written, produced and distributed by Oscar Micheaux. The Dungeon was his first horror effort, an early blaxploitation take on the Bluebeard legend.

Micheaux was criticized by D. Ireland Thomas, a columnist with the Chicago Defender, for his casting of light-skinned African Americans who could pass for white, attempting to make his films more commercially successful. Thomas questioned whether Micheaux was "relying on his name alone to tell the public that it is a race production; or maybe he is after booking it in white theaters."

No print of the film is known to exist and it is presumed to be a lost film.

== Plot ==
The film focuses on Myrtle Downing, an African-American woman who is coerced into marrying a corrupt would-be politician named Gyp Lassiter even though she is really in love with Stephen Cameron, a young lawyer. When she discovers that her husband has conspired to support segregationist policies in exchange for support by white political power brokers, she objects to his crooked dealings and gets herself imprisoned in a secret dungeon where her husband had murdered his previous wives.

== Cast ==
- Shingzie Howard as Myrtle Downing
- William Fountaine as Stephen Cameron
- J. Kenneth Goodman as Gyp Lassiter
- William Crowell
- Earle Browne Cook
- Blanche Thompson
