= The Simp =

1920 film directed by Owen Davis and Arthur Somers Roche

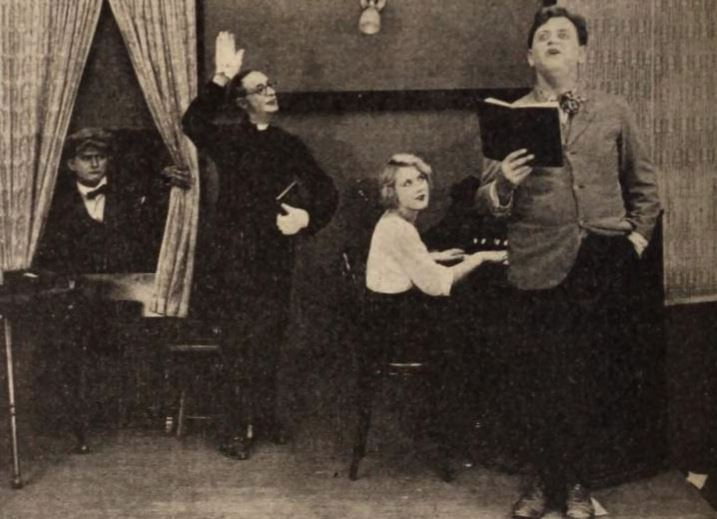
Movie still from a scene at a mission

The Simp is an extant 1920 silent comedy film starring Lloyd Hamilton. It is a Hamilton and Jack White production distributed by Educational Pictures. The film was directed by Owen Davis and Arthur Roch.

A dog features in one of its episodes. Various filming techniques are used to comedic effect. The cast features a man bumbling through various scenarios. It was also released as a Pathescope film.

A colored lobby card for the film picturing Hamilton, Marvel Rea, and a dog survives.

Billy Dooley used a similar wringing out the wet dog routine in the 1926 film Briny Boob as did Shemp Howard in the 1952 film He Cooked His Goose.

== Cast ==
- Lloyd Hamilton
- Marvel Rea
- Otto Fries
- Jess Weldon
