= The Virgin of the Seminole =

1922 film

- Directed by: Oscar Micheaux
- Written by: Oscar Micheaux
- Produced by: Oscar Micheaux
- Release date: 1922
- Country: United States
- Languages: Silent; English intertitles

The Virgin of the Seminole (sometimes listed as The Virgin of Seminole) is a 1922 race film directed, written and produced by Oscar Micheaux.

== Plot ==
The film focused on a young black man who joins the Royal Canadian Mounted Police and becomes a hero by rescuing a captive mixed-race woman from a hostile American Indian tribe. The young man later purchases a ranch that becomes the foundation for great financial wealth.

== Cast ==
- William Fountaine
- Shingzie Howard

== Production background and preservation status ==
The film had its premiere in Chicago in December 1922 and was distributed by the filmmaker's Micheaux Film Corporation. No print is known to exist, and it is considered to be a lost film.

== See also ==
- List of lost films
