= Oscar Micheaux =

Writer and African-American film director (1884–1951)

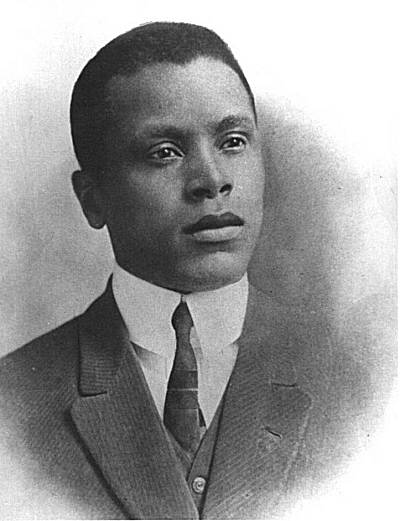
- Micheaux c. 1913
- Born: Oscar Devereaux Micheaux; January 2, 1884; Metropolis, Illinois, U.S.
- Died: March 25, 1951 (aged 67); Charlotte, North Carolina, U.S.
- Occupations: Director, author
- Spouse: Orlean McCracken (m. 1910, divorced) Alice B. Russell (m. 1926–1951)
- Awards: Directors Guild of America Awards: 1986 Golden Jubilee Special Award; Hollywood Walk of Fame: 6721 Hollywood Boulevard

Oscar Devereaux Micheaux (US: /mɪˈʃoʊ/; January 2, 1884 – March 25, 1951) was an American author, film director and independent producer of more than 44 films. Although the short-lived Lincoln Motion Picture Company was the first movie company owned and controlled by black filmmakers, Micheaux is regarded as the first major African-American feature filmmaker, a prominent producer of race films, and has been described as "the most successful African-American filmmaker of the first half of the 20th century." He produced both silent films and sound films.

== Early life and education ==
Micheaux was born on a farm in Metropolis, Illinois, on January 2, 1884. He was the fifth child born to Calvin S. and Belle Michaux, who had a total of 13 children. In his later years, Micheaux added an "e" to his last name. His father was born into slavery in Kentucky.

In his later years, Micheaux wrote about the social oppression he experienced as a young boy. His parents moved to the city so that the children could receive a better education. Micheaux attended a well-established school for several years before the family eventually ran into money troubles and were forced to return to the farm. The discontented Micheaux became rebellious and his struggles caused problems within his family. His father was not happy with him and sent him away to do marketing in the city. Micheaux found pleasure in this job because he was able to speak to many new people and learned social skills that he would later reflect in his films.

When Micheaux was 17 years old, he moved to Chicago to live with his older brother, then working as a waiter. Micheaux became dissatisfied with what he viewed as his brother's way of living "the good life". He rented his own place and found work in the stockyards, which he found difficult. He moved from the stockyards to the steel mills, holding down many different jobs.

After being "swindled out of two dollars" by an employment agency, Micheaux decided to become his own boss. His first business was a shoeshine stand, which he set up at a wealthy African-American barbershop, away from Chicago competition. He learned the basic strategies of business and started to save money. He became a Pullman porter on the major railroads, at that time considered prestigious employment for African Americans because it was relatively stable, well paid, and secure, and it enabled travel and interaction with new people. This job was an informal education for Micheaux. He profited financially, and he also gained contacts and knowledge about the world through traveling as well as a greater understanding for business. When he left the position, he had seen much of the United States, had a couple of thousand dollars saved in his bank account, and had made a number of connections with wealthy white people who helped his future endeavors.

Micheaux moved to Gregory County, South Dakota, where he bought land and worked as a homesteader. This experience inspired his first novels and films. His neighbors on the frontier were predominately blue-collar whites. "Some recall that [Micheaux] rarely sat at a table with his blue collar white neighbors." Micheaux's years as a homesteader allowed him to learn more about human relations and farming. While farming, Micheaux wrote articles and submitted them to the press. The Chicago Defender published one of his earliest articles. His homestead failed and he was forced to sell it in 1911. The next year, he began his publishing career when Woodruff Press of Lincoln, Nebraska published The Conquest. He began work on a second book, The Forged Note, and from 1914 to 1918 traveled among Lincoln, Gregory County, and Sioux City, Iowa marketing his work. While in Sioux City, he lived in and was influenced by the West 7th Street neighborhood where the town's African-American community had a strong presence.

== Writing and film career ==
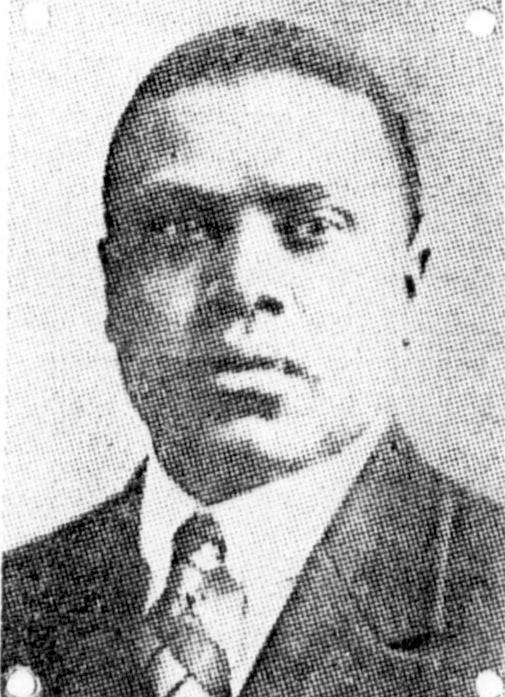
Micheaux in 1919

Micheaux decided to concentrate on writing and, eventually, filmmaking, a new industry. He wrote seven novels.

In 1913, one thousand copies of his first book, The Conquest: The Story of a Negro Pioneer, were printed. He published the book anonymously, for unknown reasons. He based it on his experiences as a homesteader and the failure of his first marriage and it was largely autobiographical. Although character names have been changed, the protagonist is named Oscar Devereaux. His theme was about African Americans realizing their potential and succeeding in areas where they had not felt they could. The book outlines the difference between city lifestyles of Negroes and the life he decided to lead as a lone Negro out on the far West as a pioneer. He discusses the culture of doers who want to accomplish and those who see themselves as victims of injustice and hopelessness and who do not want to try to succeed, but instead like to pretend to be successful while living the city lifestyle in poverty. He had become frustrated with getting some members of his race to populate the frontier and make something of themselves, with real work and property investment. He wrote more than 100 letters to fellow Negroes in the East beckoning them to come West, but only his older brother eventually took his advice. One of Micheaux's fundamental beliefs was that hard work and enterprise would make any person rise to respect and prominence no matter his or her race.

In 1918, his novel The Homesteader, dedicated to his mother, attracted the attention of George Johnson, the manager of the Lincoln Motion Picture Company in Los Angeles. After Johnson offered to make The Homesteader into a new feature film, negotiations and paperwork became inharmonious. Micheaux wanted to be directly involved in the adaptation of his book as a movie, but Johnson resisted and never produced the film.

Instead, Micheaux founded the Micheaux Film & Book Company of Sioux City; its first project was the production of The Homesteader as a feature film. And so began Micheaux's major career as a film producer and director: He produced more than 40 films, which drew audiences throughout the U.S. as well as internationally. Micheaux contacted wealthy academic connections from his earlier career as a porter, and sold stock for his company at $75 to $100 a share. Micheaux hired actors and actresses and decided to have the premiere in Chicago. The film and Micheaux received high praise from film critics. One article credited Micheaux with "a historic breakthrough, a creditable, dignified achievement". Some members of the Chicago clergy criticized the film as libelous. The Homesteader became known as Micheaux's breakout film; it helped him become widely known as a writer and a filmmaker.

In addition to writing and directing his own films, Micheaux also adapted the works of different writers for his silent pictures. Many of his films were open, blunt and thought-provoking regarding certain racial issues of that time. He once commented: "It is only by presenting those portions of the race portrayed in my pictures, in the light and background of their true state, that we can raise our people to greater heights." Financial hardships during the Great Depression eventually made it impossible for Micheaux to keep producing films, and he returned to writing.

== Films ==
Micheaux's first novel The Conquest was adapted to film and re-titled The Homesteader. This film, released in 1919, met with critical and commercial success. It revolves around a man named Jean Baptiste, called the Homesteader, who falls in love with many white women but resists marrying one out of his loyalty to his race. Baptiste sacrifices love to be a key symbol for his fellow African Americans. He looks for love among his own people and marries an African-American woman. Relations between the couple deteriorate. Eventually, Baptiste is not allowed to see his wife. She kills her father for keeping them apart and commits suicide. Baptiste is accused of the crime, but is ultimately cleared. An old love helps him through his troubles. After he learns that she is a mulatto and thus part-African, they marry. This film deals extensively with race relationships.

Micheaux's second silent film was Within Our Gates, produced in 1920. Although sometimes considered his response to the film The Birth of a Nation, Micheaux said that he created it independently as a response to the widespread social instability following World War I. Within Our Gates revolved around the main character, Sylvia Landry, a mixed-race school teacher played by actress Evelyn Preer. In a flashback, Sylvia is shown growing up as the adopted daughter of a sharecropper. When her father confronts their white landlord over money, a fight ensues. The landlord is shot by another white man, but Sylvia's adoptive father is accused and lynched with her adoptive mother.

Sylvia is almost raped by the landowner's brother but discovers that he is her biological father. Micheaux always depicts African Americans as being serious and reaching for higher education. Before the flashback scene, we see that Sylvia travels to Boston, seeking funding for her school, which serves black children. They are underserved by the segregated society. On her journey, she is hit by the car of a rich white woman. Learning about Landry's cause, the woman decides to give her school $50,000.

In the film, Micheaux depicts educated and professional people in black society as light-skinned, representing the elite status of some of the mixed-race people who comprised the majority of African Americans free before the Civil War. Poor people are represented as dark-skinned and with more undiluted African ancestry. Mixed-race people also feature as some of the villains. The film is set within the Jim Crow era. It contrasted the experiences for African Americans who stayed in rural areas and others who had migrated to cities and become urbanized. Micheaux explored the suffering of African Americans in the present day, without explaining how the situation arose in history. Some feared that this film would cause even more unrest within society, and others believed it would open the public's eyes to the unjust treatment of blacks by whites. Protests against the film continued until the day it was released. Because of its controversial status, the film was banned from some theaters.

Micheaux adapted two works by Charles W. Chesnutt, which he released under their original titles: The Conjure Woman (1926) and The House Behind the Cedars (1927). The latter, which dealt with issues of mixed race and passing, created so much controversy when reviewed by the Film Board of Virginia that Micheaux was forced to make cuts to have it shown. He remade this story as a sound film in 1932, releasing it with the title Veiled Aristocrats. The silent version of the film is believed to have been lost.

== Themes ==
Micheaux's films were made during a time of great change in the African-American community. His films featured contemporary black life. He dealt with racial relationships between blacks and whites, and the challenges for blacks when trying to achieve success in the larger society. His films were used to oppose and discuss the racial injustice that African Americans received. Topics such as lynching, job discrimination, rape, mob violence, and economic exploitation were depicted in his films. These films also reflect his ideologies and autobiographical experiences.

Micheaux sought to create films that would counter negative portrayals of African Americans in films by white producers, which trafficked in degrading stereotypes. He created complex characters of different classes. His films questioned the value system of both African-American and Euro-American societies, which stirred controversy with the press and state censors.

== Style ==
Critic Barbara Lupack described Micheaux as pursuing moderation with his films and creating a "middle-class cinema". His works were designed to appeal to both middle- and lower-class audiences.

Micheaux said,

My results ... might have been narrow at times, due perhaps to certain limited situations, which I endeavored to portray, but in those limited situations, the truth was the predominant characteristic. It is only by presenting those portions of the race portrayed in my pictures, in the light and background of their true state, that we can raise our people to greater heights. I am too imbued with the spirit of Booker T. Washington to engraft false virtues upon ourselves, to make ourselves that which we are not.

== Death ==
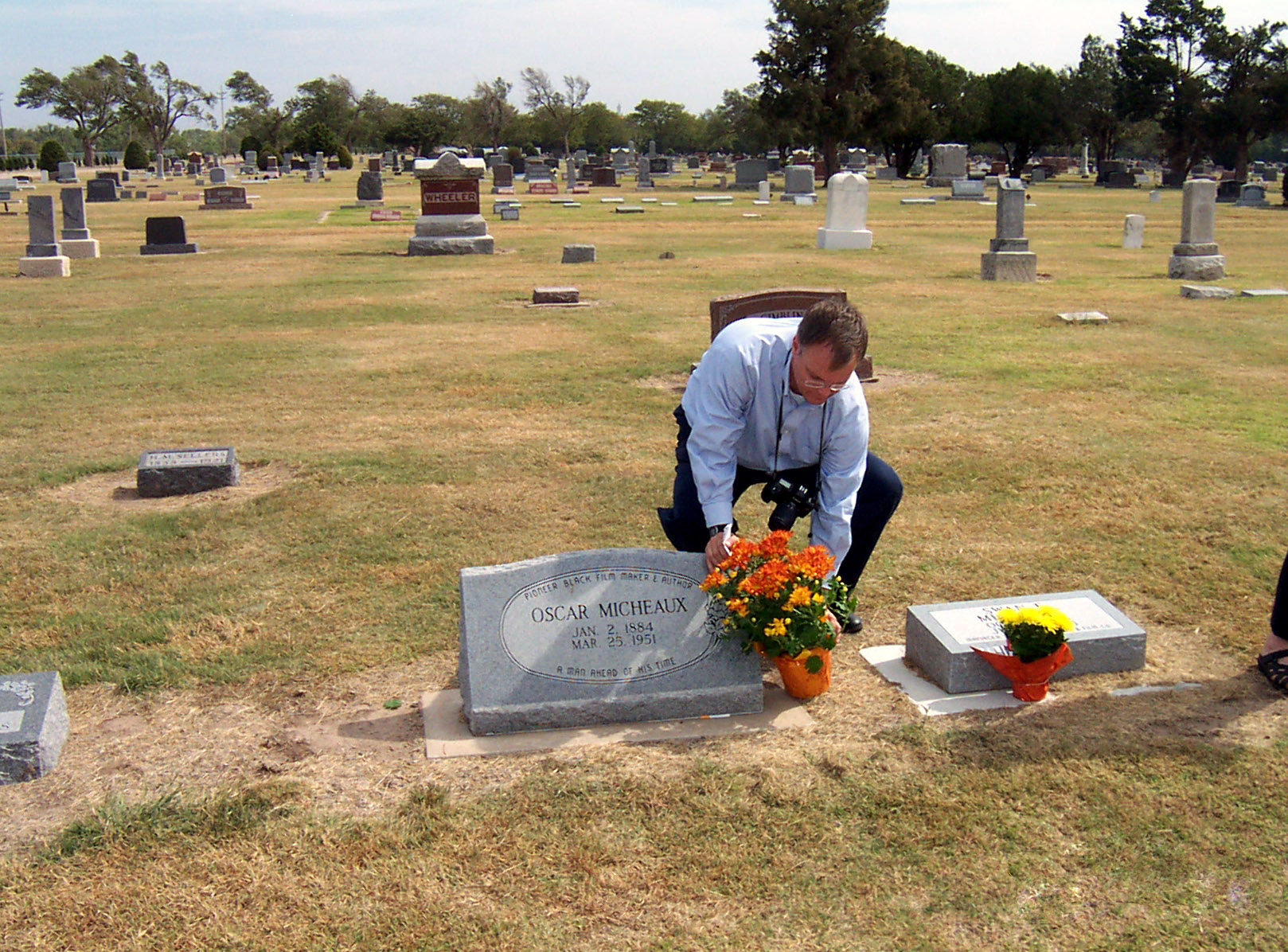
Grave of Oscar Micheaux in Great Bend being decorated during the 2005 Oscar Micheaux festival

Micheaux died on March 25, 1951, in Charlotte, North Carolina, of heart failure, aged 67. He is buried in Great Bend Cemetery in Great Bend, Kansas, the home of his youth. His gravestone reads: "A man ahead of his time".

== Personal life ==
In South Dakota, Micheaux married Orlean McCracken. Her family proved to be complex and burdensome for Micheaux. Unhappy with their living arrangements, Orlean felt that Micheaux did not pay enough attention to her. She gave birth while he was away on business, and was reported to have emptied their bank accounts and fled. Orlean's father sold Micheaux's property and took the money from the sale. After his return, Micheaux tried unsuccessfully to get Orlean and his property back. He married Alice B. Russell in 1926. Oscar and Alice remained married until his death.

== Legacy, influence, and honors ==
- The Oscar Micheaux Society at Duke University continues to honor his work and educate about his legacy.
- In 1987, Micheaux was recognized with a star on the Hollywood Walk of Fame.
- In 1989, the Directors Guild of America honored Micheaux with a Golden Jubilee Special Award.
- The Producers Guild of America created an annual award in his name.
- In 1989, the Black Filmmakers Hall of Fame gave him a posthumous award.
- Gregory, South Dakota holds an annual Oscar Micheaux Film Festival.
- In 2001, Oscar Micheaux Golden Anniversary Festival (March 24–25) Great Bend, Kansas
- In 2002, scholar Molefi Kete Asante included Oscar Micheaux on his list of 100 Greatest African Americans.
- On June 22, 2010, the US Postal Service issued a 44-cent, Oscar Micheaux commemorative stamp.
- In 2011, the Taubman Museum of Art in Roanoke, Virginia, created a category for donors, the Micheaux Society, in honor of Micheaux.
- Midnight Ramble: Oscar Micheaux and the Story of Race Movies (1994) is a documentary whose title refers to the early 20th-century practice of some segregated cinemas of screening films for African-American audiences only at matinees and midnight. The documentary was produced by Pamela Thomas, directed by Pearl Bowser and Bestor Cram, and written by Clyde Taylor. It was first aired on the PBS show The American Experience in 1994, and released in 2004.
- In 2019, Micheaux's film Body and Soul was selected by the Library of Congress for preservation in the National Film Registry for being "culturally, historically, or aesthetically significant".
- The Oscar Micheaux Award for excellence was established.
- The Academy Museum of Motion Pictures has an exhibition devoted to his works.
- The Micheaux Film Festival was established in 2018 to celebrate his legacy, showcasing films that reflect his pioneering spirit and commitment to diverse storytelling.

=== The Czar of Black Hollywood ===
In 2014, Block Starz Music Television released The Czar of Black Hollywood, a documentary film chronicling the early life and career of Oscar Micheaux using Library of Congress archived footage, photos, illustrations and vintage music. The film was announced by American radio host Tom Joyner on his nationally syndicated program, The Tom Joyner Morning Show, as part of a "Little Known Black History Fact" on Micheaux. In an interview with The Washington Times, filmmaker Bayer Mack said he read the 2007 biography Oscar Micheaux: The Great and Only by Patrick McGilligan and was inspired to produce The Czar of Black Hollywood because Micheaux's life mirrored his own. Mack told The Huffington Post he was shocked that, in spite of Micheaux's historical significance, there was "virtually nothing out there about [his] life". The film's executive producer, Frances Presley Rice, told the Sun Sentinel that Micheaux was the first "indie movie producer". In 2018, Mack was interviewed by the news site Mic for its "Black Monuments Project", which named Oscar Micheaux as one of its 50 African Americans deserving of a statue. He said Micheaux embodied "the best of what we all are as Americans" and that the filmmaker was "an inspiration". A historical marker in Roanoke, Virginia, commemorates his time living and working in the city as a film producer.

=== The Lincoln Motion Picture Company ===
Micheaux was not the only person in the early race film industry. Other filmmakers, like the ones in the Lincoln Motion Picture Company, based in Omaha, Nebraska, produced similar works and covered similar themes. The company was founded in 1916 by Noble Johnson and George Perry Johnson. and produced five films before going defunct in 1921 after relocating to Los Angeles, California.

== Works ==
=== Filmography ===
- The Homesteader (1919) [Lost]
- Within Our Gates (1920) [Survives]
- The Brute (1920) [Lost]
- The Symbol of the Unconquered (1920)[Survives (incomplete)]
- The Gunsaulus Mystery (1921) [Lost]
- The Dungeon (1922) [Lost]
- The Hypocrite (1922) [Lost]
- Uncle Jasper's Will (1922) [Lost]
- The Virgin of the Seminole (1922) [Lost]
- Deceit (1923) [Unknown]
- Birthright (1924) [Lost]
- A Son of Satan (1924) [Lost]
- Body and Soul (1925) [Survives]
- Marcus Garland (1925) [Lost]
- The Conjure Woman (1926), adapted from novel by Charles W. Chesnutt [Lost]
- The Devil's Disciple (1926) [Unknown]
- The Spider's Web (1926) [Lost]
- The Millionaire (1927) [Lost]
- The Broken Violin (1928) [Lost]
- The House Behind the Cedars (1927), adapted from novel by Charles W. Chesnutt [Lost]
- Thirty Years Later (1928) [Lost]
- When Men Betray (1929) [Lost]
- The Wages of Sin (1929) [Lost]
- Easy Street (1930) [Lost]
- A Daughter of the Congo (1930) [Lost]
- Darktown Revue (1931) [Survives]
- The Exile (1931) [Survives]
- Veiled Aristocrats (1932) [fragments; Survives (incomplete)]
- Ten Minutes to Live (1932)[Survives]
- Black Magic (1932) [Survives]
- The Girl from Chicago (1932) [Survives]
- Phantom of Kenwood (1933) [Survives]
- Harlem After Midnight (1934) [Lost]
- Murder in Harlem (1935) [Survives]
- Temptation (1935) [Survives]
- Underworld (1937) [Survives]
- God's Step Children (1938) [Survives]
- Swing! (1938) [Survives]
- Lying Lips (1939) [Survives]
- Birthright (1939) [Survives]
- The Notorious Elinor Lee (1940) [Survives]
- The Betrayal (1948) [Lost]

=== Books ===
- The Conquest: The Story of a Negro Pioneer. Lincoln, Nebraska: Woodruff Press. 1913. ISBN 9780803282094. OCLC 254051406 – via Google Books.
- The Forged Note. Lincoln, Nebraska: Western Book Supply Company. 1915. OCLC 2058028.
- The Homesteader: A Novel. Sioux City, Iowa: Western Book Supply Company. 1917. OCLC 10616358.
- The Wind from Nowhere. New York: Book Supply Company. 1941. OCLC 682477 – via Google Books.
- The Case of Mrs. Wingate. New York: Book Supply Company. 1944. OCLC 5541463 – via Google Books.
- The Story of Dorothy Stanfield. New York: Book Supply Company. 1946. OCLC 300792169 – via Google Books.
- Masquerade, a Historical Novel. New York: Book Supply Company. 1947. OCLC 300739700 – via Google Books.

== See also ==
- Deanna Michaux
- Black homesteaders
- Lincoln Motion Picture Company
