= The Wife of His Youth =

1898 short story by Charles W. Chesnutt

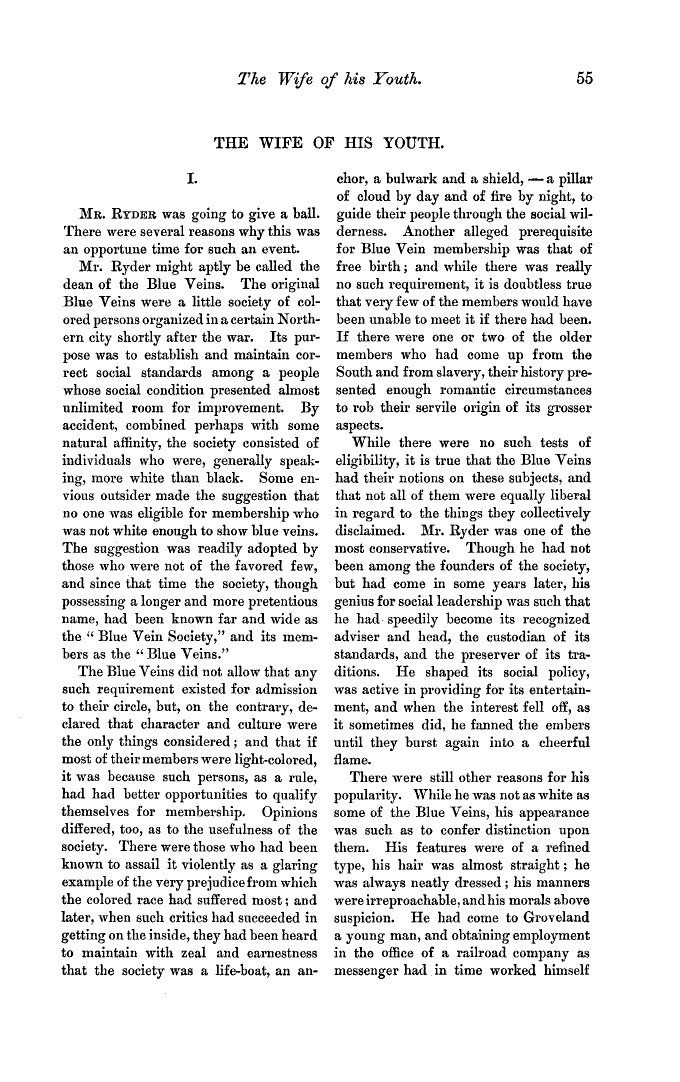
"The Wife of His Youth" as first published in The Atlantic Monthly, July 1898

"The Wife of His Youth" is a short story by American author Charles W. Chesnutt, first published in July 1898. It later served as the title story of the collection The Wife of His Youth and Other Stories of the Color-Line. That book was first published in 1899, the same year Chesnutt published his short story collection The Conjure Woman.

"The Wife of His Youth" features an upwardly mobile, light-skinned mulatto man who is a respected member of the Blue Veins Society in a Midwestern city. He is preparing to marry another light-skinned mulatto woman when a much darker woman comes to him seeking her husband, whom she has not seen in 25 years. The story, which was met positively upon its publication, has become Chesnutt's most anthologized work.

The story has been read as an analysis of race relations, not between black and white but within the black community, exploring its own color and class prejudices. The main character dreams of becoming white but ultimately seems to accept being black and the full history of African Americans in the United States. The ending of the story, however, has been called ambiguous and leaves several questions unanswered.

== Plot ==
"The Wife of His Youth" follows Mr. Ryder, a biracial man who was born and reared free before the Civil War. He heads the "Blue Veins Society", a social organization for colored people in a northern town; the membership consists of people with a high proportion of European ancestry, who look more white than black. The organization's name stemmed from the joke that one would have to be so white (to be a member) that veins could be seen through the skin.

Ryder is sought after by the town's women but begins courting a very light mixed-race woman from Washington, DC, named Molly Dixon. He plans to propose to her at the next Blue Vein ball, for which he is giving a speech. Before the talk, he meets an older, plain-looking black woman. Her name is 'Liza Jane, and she is searching for her husband Sam Taylor, whom she has not seen in 25 years. She says she was married to Sam before the Civil War, when she was enslaved and he was a hired apprentice to the family of her master. Despite Taylor's being a free black, the family tried to sell him into slavery. She assisted Sam in escaping, and he promised to return and free her, but she was sold to a different master. Ryder says that Taylor could have died, may have outgrown her, or could have remarried. However, she persists in saying that her husband has remained faithful, and refuses to stop looking. Ryder advises her that slave marriages did not count after the war; marriages had to be officially made legal. She shows him an old picture of Sam and leaves.

At the ball Ryder addresses the members and tells them 'Liza Jane's story. At the conclusion, he asks the attendees whether or not they think the man should acknowledge his wife. Everyone urges yes. He brings out 'Liza and says, "Ladies and gentlemen, this is the woman, and I am the man, whose story I have told you. Permit me to introduce to you the wife of my youth."

== Publication and response ==
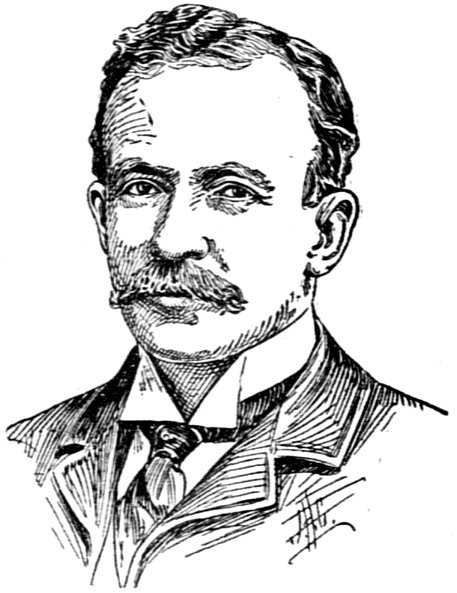
Charles W. Chesnutt, author of "The Wife of His Youth", c. 1899

"The Wife of His Youth" was first published in the July 1898 issue of The Atlantic Monthly, without reference to the author's own racial background (he was African American, with majority-white ancestry). Reviews were positive. After Chesnutt read several compliments from friends and in various newspaper reviews, he wrote to editor Walter Hines Page, "taking it all in all, I have had a slight glimpse of what it means, I imagine, to be a successful author."

One later review by influential critic William Dean Howells particularly praised Chesnutt. In "The Wife of His Youth", Howells was impressed that the main character offered up a Christ-like sacrifice, unimpeded by his being African American. In the 20th century, "The Wife of His Youth" became Chesnutt's most anthologized short story.

Chesnutt had published "The Goophered Grapevine" in the August 1887 issue of the Atlantic during the editorship of Thomas Bailey Aldrich. It was his first nationally distributed story. He published two others under Aldrich, marking the beginning of a 20-year association with the magazine. In 1891, Chesnutt contacted Aldrich's successor Horace Scudder about publishing a book of his tales and revealed his African-American heritage. Scudder advised against trying a book at that time, and suggested Chesnutt wait until he earned a broader reputation. Seven years later, Scudder endorsed Chesnutt to Page, who had taken his role as editor of the Atlantic.

With the support of both Scudder and Page, Houghton Mifflin published The Wife of his Youth and Other Stories of the Color Line in 1899, which included "The Passing of Grandison", which turned slave narratives around. That year, he also published his The Conjure Woman, a collection of his dialect or local color stories. The next year, Chesnutt's first novel The House Behind the Cedars was published by the same company. Chesnutt advised his editor Harry D. Robins of his intentions with The Wife of His Youth and Other Stories of the Color Line:

"The book was written with the distinct hope that it might have its influence in directing attention to certain aspects of the race question which are quite familiar to those on the unfortunate side of it; and I should be glad to have that view of it emphasized if in your opinion the book is strong enough to stand it; for a sermon that is labeled a sermon must be a good one to get a hearing".

Many years later, Carl Van Vechten, who corresponded with Chesnutt, included a character in his novel, Nigger Heaven (1926), who reads "The Wife of His Youth" and its accompanying stories. The character despairingly realizes he will never write as well as Chesnutt. From the book:

He lifted The Wife of his Youth from its place on the table and opened its pages for the hundredth time. How much he admired the cool deliberation of its style, the sense of form, but more than all the civilized mind of this man who had surveyed the problems of his race from an Olympian height and had turned them into living and artistic drama. Nothing seemed to have escaped his attention, from the lowly life of the worker on the Southern plantation to the snobbery of the near whites of the north. Chesnutt had surveyed the entire field, calmly setting down what he saw, what he thought and felt about it.

== Analysis ==
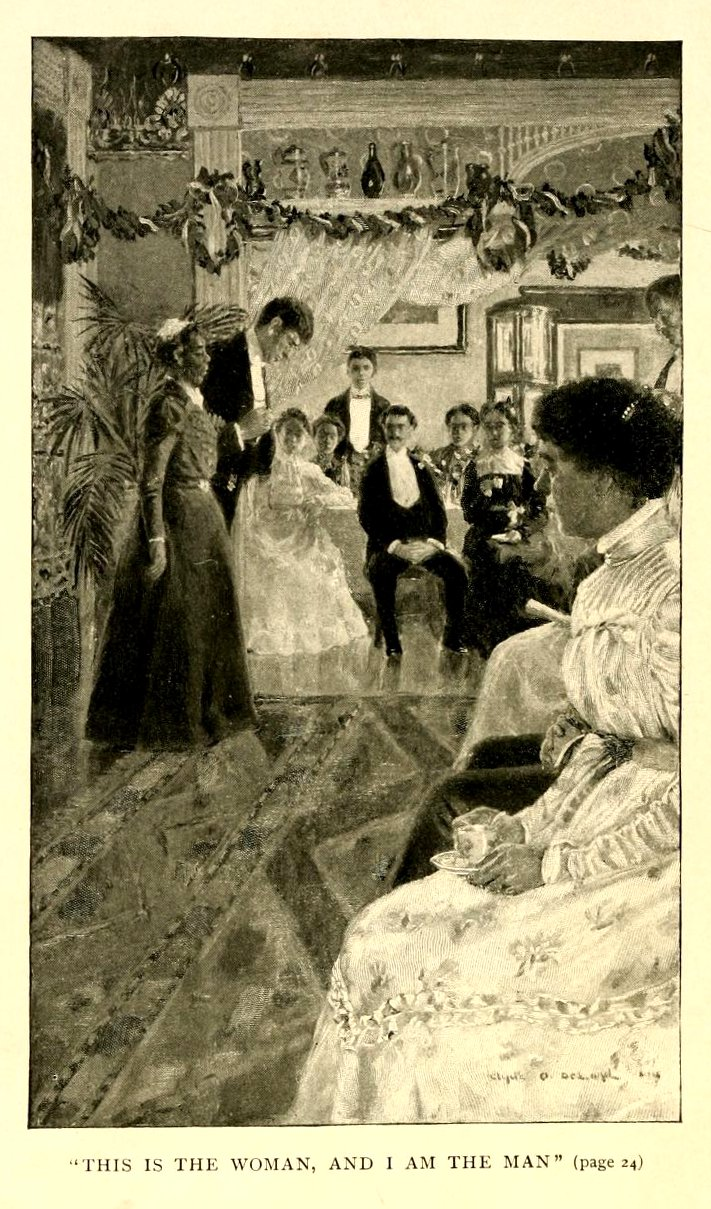
"This is the woman, and I am the man", from The Wife of His Youth and Other Stories of the Color Line (Houghton Mifflin, 1899)

In "The Wife of His Youth", Charles Chesnutt does not explore the relationship between whites and mulattoes; instead, the story is concerned with race consciousness among those of mixed race, both from the North and South. Scholar William L. Andrews notes that this story, and others like it including "A Matter of Principle", were unprecedented. Chesnutt "broke the ice in the American fiction of manners." Like the other Blue Veins, Ryder has idealized whiteness and dreams of becoming white or, as Chesnutt writes it, "[his] absorption by the white race." This is symbolized by his reading "A Dream of Fair Women" by Alfred, Lord Tennyson when his wife first appears in the story.

White readers, such as William Dean Howells, considered this a realistic portrayal of mixed-race Americans, revealed by Chesnutt as an "insider", much as Paul Laurence Dunbar had shown whites the lyrical side of blacks. Howells wrote:

We had known the nethermost world of the grotesque and comical negro and the terrible and tragic negro through the white observer on the outside, and the black character in its lyrical moods we had known from such an inside witness as Mr. Paul Dunbar; but it had remained for Mr. Chesnutt to acquaint us with those regions where the paler shades dwell as hopelessly, with relation to ourselves [i.e. whites], as the blackest negro.

Ultimately, Chesnutt is challenging the idea of two "races". The story serves as an allegory of the changing relationship of freeborn and freedmen, mixed race and blacks, in a post-Reconstruction Era. Such differences are expressed in language used by the characters, which also reflects differing education and class levels. Ryder tries to speak in the higher rhetoric of "white" English (emulating the Tennyson he reads) while 'Liza uses a thick black dialect. That difference is further emphasized by Ryder's writing 'Liza's address in the flyleaf of his Tennyson book and, when recounting her story, switching into his own "soft dialect". Ann duCille suggests the story questions the legality of marriage during enslavement. Ryder/Taylor's decision is about choosing to accept or negate "the old plantation past", or, as duCille writes, "between moral obligation and romantic desire".

Cynthia Wachtell considers the story as a social satire. Ryder is pretentious and uppity, concerned about the delineations in class based on skin color, and promotes advancement of lighter-skinned people, some of whom were already educated before the war. That his wife is revealed to be a dark-skinned, unrefined cook is his "just desserts [sic]". Dean McWilliams notes the ambiguity about whether Ryder really is Sam Taylor. Certainly, writes McWilliams, the drawing room image of Ryder at the beginning of the story seems nothing like the plantation worker described by 'Liza.

Even if he is Taylor, Tess Chakkalakal questions if the reader should be certain that Ryder has made the "right" decision. There is an uncomfortable tension in his attempt to abandon the past and racial definitions in order to move into the future. Though the story has been traditionally read as having a happy ending, Wachtell emphasizes that 'Liza has no final lines which show her response to the husband who had forgotten her. Henry B. Wonham notes a significance to Ryder's referring to 'Liza not simply as wife but "the wife of my youth", as if dissociating from her even as he acknowledges her.
