= Grandison =

Grandison is a given name and a surname.

== Given name ==
- Grandison Fairchild (1792–1890), American reformer
- Grandison Delaney Royston (1809–1889), American politician
- Charles Grandison Finney (1792–1875), American Christian minister
- Felton Grandison Clark (1903-1970), African-American university president

== Surname ==
- Anthony Grandison (born 1953), American drug dealer
- Jacob Grandison (born 1998), American basketball player
- Jermaine Grandison (born 1990), English footballer who plays for Shrewsbury Town F.C.
- Ronnie Grandison (born 1964), American basketball player

=== Fictional characters ===
- Sir Charles Grandison, title character of a 1753 novel by Samuel Richardson
- Grandison, title character of a 1899 short story by Charles W. Chesnutt

== See also ==
- Baron Grandison, extinct barony
- Viscount Grandison, Irish viscountcy
