= Evelyn's Husband =

Book by Charles Chesnutt

- Original book cover of Evelyn's Husband
- Author: Charles W. Chesnutt
- Language: English
- Genre: Fiction
- Set in: Boston
- Published: 2005 by University Press of Mississippi
- Publication place: United States
- Media type: Print
- Pages: 289 pp
- ISBN: 978-1-5780-6760-2
- OCLC: 57002310
- Dewey Decimal: 813.4
- LC Class: PS1292.C6

Evelyn's Husband is a novel by African American author Charles W. Chesnutt. It published posthumously by the University of Mississippi in 2005 from an unpublished manuscript by which was edited by Matthew Wilson and Marjan Van Schaik.

Few details about writing of the work are known, other than a rejection letter from McClure Phillips in 1903. The book portrays a love triangle of white high-society in early 19th century Boston. His writing straddles both the local color and literary realism schools of genre in American writing.

== Plot overview ==
Evelyn's Husband is the African American author Charles W. Chesnutt's attempt at portraying white life in Boston in the early 1900s. The book examines the role of fate on the lives of two men, one older and one younger, in their pursuit of the same woman.

== Plot summary ==
The novel Evelyn's Husband revolves around four major characters, placing them in extraordinary situations under the power of coincidental fate in order to examine human nature, morality, and love. The primary plot involves Edward Cushing—an older, rich gentleman who acted as Evelyn's guardian for much of her life—and Hugh Manson—a young newly successful architect—who compete for the love of Evelyn Thayer. Her widow mother, Alice Thayer, has a romantic interest in Cushing, the friend of her deceased husband who has acted as a guardian and benefactor of the Thayer family. Despite this romantic interest, Alice feels compelled to repay Cushing for his kindness towards the Thayer family.

This book starts in the Thayer household, where Edward Cushing waits to take Alice and Evelyn to an opera. The background details of Mr. Thayer's death and Cushing's presence in the Thayer's life are explained, as well as the proposed marriage of Evelyn to Cushing. After Mr. Thayer's death, Alice had a romantic interest in Cushing, but now regards these feelings as those of friendship. Cushing, business partners and friends with Mr. Thayer, gained a huge respect for the Thayer family and helped them economically after Mr. Thayer's death. He regards Alice as a great friend bound to her husband's memory. Alice now greatly desires her daughter, Evelyn, to marry Cushing in order to repay the family's debt to Cushing.

At the opera, Evelyn becomes the center of attention for many young men, including Hugh Manson and William Rice. These men approach Evelyn and her mother when Cushing leaves to use the telephone. Manson cannot take his eyes off Evelyn, and invites the ladies to his office to review plans for Rice's new house. Evelyn finds Manson attractive and bold, and questions if she feels love for Cushing. Regarding him as a guardian her entire life, Evelyn contemplates whether she loves him at all.

The next day, Cushing travels to New York. Alice's son, Wentworth, went to college and began drinking and using drugs. He also ran away with a woman, leaving little contact with his family. Cushing goes to New York to help Wentworth, who is now ill. While he is away, Evelyn and Alice go to an art gallery that Manson talked about at the opera. Manson spends the entire day periodically checking the art gallery, and subsequently runs into the two women. They all spend the day together, and learn of an upcoming party thrown by Mrs. Archer. The following day Evelyn goes to an art museum alone, where she again runs into Manson. He reveals his past, telling her of his poor upbringing in Kentucky. After their time together, Manson reveals his love for Evelyn. She informs him of her engagement, to which he remarks that she is not bound to Cushing until marriage.

Cushing, tied up with Wentworth in New York, cannot make Mrs. Archer's party. He sends gifts to the women, and Evelyn feels dread and regret towards her engagement with him. Questioning the power of love, she remarks that she feels like a prisoner in her engagement. At the party, many men ask Evelyn to dance, and her beauty bewilders the men. Manson and Evelyn share many dances and explore the grand house together. Alice becomes concerned about their disappearance and searches the house for them. Outside, she finds Evelyn and Manson talking alone. He says he wants her to break off her engagement and kisses her. Alice watches this, then takes Evelyn back inside. She immediately finds Mrs. Archer and announces the engagement of Evelyn and Cushing. Knowing Mrs. Archer will inform other guests, the two women leave, Evelyn devastated.

At home, Alice scolds Evelyn about her behavior. She tells Evelyn the extent of the family obligation to Cushing, revealing how crucial he is to their family success. Leonie, a servant of the family, overhears the conversation from the stairs. Evelyn, after hearing the truth, accepts her duty to marry Cushing, and writes a letter to Manson to terminate their love affair.

One month to the wedding, Cushing and Evelyn make plans to sail to Europe for a honeymoon. Amidst wedding planning, Alice wonders again why Cushing loves Evelyn and never was interested in her. Moving past this, she helps make arrangements for the wedding, and hides letters mailed to Evelyn from Manson proclaiming his love. Leonie, now aware of the love scandal, saves one of the letters and gives it to Evelyn. On the day of the wedding, Evelyn leaves the house and meets Manson. They elope, leaving Alice hysterical and Cushing alone to sail to Europe.

The book's next chapter reviews their first year of marriage, detailing Cushing's new cynical and skeptical attitude, developed with his trip around the world. Alice and Evelyn have a strained relationship, and Alice still displays contempt for Manson. Manson partnered with a man named Sterlings, and has experienced a lot of success as an architect. As Manson becomes very involved with his job, Evelyn starts to feel neglected and unhappy in their marriage. One night, she makes a special dinner for Manson, who fails to come home. She goes to her mother's house instead, and meets Cushing there. She felt embarrassed seeing him, but had a pleasant night with them. The next day Evelyn receives an upsetting letter and asks Manson for money. Distracted with thoughts of his busy day, he does not notice her dismal attitude and refuses to give her money. Manson is on the verge of acquiring a huge architecture deal for his company, is holding risky stocks, and needs to renew fire insurance on a house he is building as a surprise for Evelyn. Despite his busy day, he comes home for lunch to meet Evelyn, only to find her gone. She left a letter saying she was leaving, and Leonie told him that she left with Cushing for New York. Manson starts a wild pursuit, following closely behind her the entire time. Fate keeps him from meeting them at several points, causing him to miss trains, ships, and the sight of Alice. On this chase, Manson forgets all his obligations at work. His insurance expires, and his house for Evelyn burns. The stocks plummet, and he misses a meeting for his architecture firm.

Searching for clues, Manson sees a steamer to South America with Cushing and Thayer as passengers. Unfortunately, Manson misses the ship, and boards a smaller non-passenger ship headed for South America. A hurricane comes while at sea, sinking the ship and rendering its crew to lifeboats. Everyone in Manson's boat dies from starvation and suicide, and Manson loses his sight. His boat drifts to an island, where an unnamed man rescues him, feeding him and bringing him back to life. His sight, however, does not return. The man is soon discovered to be Cushing, who jumped from his ship to save a friend who became neurotic at sea and jumped overboard. Cushing knows Manson's identity, due to his constant rambling about his situation and strong desire for revenge on the man that took his wife Evelyn away. Manson claims he wants to kill Cushing out of revenge. After much internal contemplation, Cushing decides not to tell Manson his identity, and uses the identity of Henry Singleton, to perform an experiment. He is interested in seeing if Manson, when regaining his sight, is motivated more by the emotions of anger and revenge towards his enemy or by love and thankfulness to his friend, the alias Henry Singleton, who nursed him back to health on the deserted island. Many ironic and coincidental conversations occur while on the island, while we as readers know Manson is talking to both his enemy and friend at once.

A ship comes to shore one day, and offer to save Cushing and Manson. Manson is on the other side of the island, though, and Cushing would need to lead him to their ship. A storm was coming, and the ship could not wait long. Cushing runs and tries to hurry Manson along, who has an injured ankle. Unfortunately, they just barely miss the ship. They say they will come back when the storm is through, but the ship wrecks at sea during the storm, and Cushing and Manson remain alone.

Manson grows devastatingly ill, and Cushing decides to sail from the island in the lifeboat that brought Manson to shore. A steamer picks them up within a day. During this time, Charles W. Chesnutt reveals to the reader that Evelyn and her mother are safely at home. Wentworth Thayer was on the ship with Cushing, who was taking him to South America to help him recover. Evelyn never wanted to leave Manson, and only wanted to leave a note to upset him. People working on the ship reveal that Evelyn and Alice were going to take their ship but instead boarded another one headed for South America. Wentworth, despite jumping overboard, was alive after rescue, and recovering in Brazil, and Alice and Evelyn were going to visit him. The women's ship was taken off course, and about a week behind their ship. Upon arrival in Brazil, Cushing found Manson a doctor to help him recover and operate on his eyes. The two use false identities. They find a doctor working coincidentally in the same hospital where Wentworth is recovering, and where Evelyn and Alice will be visiting. The operation on Manson's eyes is a success, and Cushing contemplates if Manson will recognize him as Cushing, and what his reaction will be.

After recovery, Manson does not recognize Cushing, and asks him to find his enemy. Cushing says he found him and arranged a meeting for them. Cushing writes a note to Alice and Evelyn, which Alice immediately recognizes as Cushing's handwriting. The two women believed Cushing and Manson were dead, and have a new hope after this letter. On the date of the meeting, Cushing takes Manson to a mountain and leaves him alone to meet his enemy. Cushing replaced the bullets in Manson's gun with blanks prior to the meeting. He walks back to Manson shortly after leaving, and Manson becomes confused, calling his enemy a coward. Cushing then reveals his identity, and Manson deliberates what to do. He wants to kill his enemy Cushing, but swore his life to his friend 'Henry'. He decides to take his own life, as his friend and enemy are the same, and he owes his life to his friend. Before he pulls the trigger, Evelyn comes and grabs Manson's arm. The bullet deflects and hits Cushing. Alice catches him and holds him as he clings to life. Alice still loves Cushing, and Cushing—after discussions with Manson about his enemy proposing to the daughter of a beautiful, age appropriate woman that loved him—feels love for Alice as well.

Fortunately, Cushing does not die. He is taken to the hospital and recovers with Wentworth, with Alice by their bedside. Evelyn and Manson return happily back home. Evelyn reveals to him how she saved their life at home. The majority of the house fire occurred before noon, when the insurance expired. The insurance company also did not want to lose connections with a successful architect, so paid for much of the rebuilding of the house. Evelyn rebuilt the house, beautifully. The plummeted stocks regained huge value and Evelyn sold them, making a large profit. Additionally, despite missing the meeting for his architecture business, their proposal was accepted by Howell and Baker's. His life at home was a success, and the two returned happily, vowing to abandon secretiveness in love. Alice and Cushing married, and Wentworth promised to put his life to use.

The last scene shows Evelyn and Manson at a restaurant with William Rice. A woman named Mademoiselle St. Clar is singing. Evelyn recognizes her as Leonie, and expresses contempt for her. Manson, however, knows that she helped him secure his happy life with Evelyn and respects the role she played in his life.

== Characters ==
=== Major characters ===
- Edward Cushing- Wealthy older gentleman who became friends and partners with Mr. Thayer at Harvard. He became a doctor but did not like the profession and entered law school, which he disliked as well. He likes traveling and earned success when he went into business with Thayer. Cushing declined an investment that Thayer took, and ultimately lost much of his savings to. When Thayer died, he became a benefactor to the Thayer family, and ultimately falls in love with Evelyn. A thoughtful and gracious man, he performs a thought experiment on Manson, examining the power of human emotions. At the end of the novel, he realizes his love for Alice.
- Alice Thayer- Mother to Evelyn and Wentworth, Alice is consistently described as beautiful and youthful. Widowed at 22 years old, she fell in love with Cushing. She has high morals and operates on fulfilling obligations. She encourages her daughter to marry Cushing despite Evelyn's love for Manson, and her own love for Cushing, in order to repay the family's debt to him. She marries Cushing in the end of the novel.
- Evelyn Thayer- Consistently described as intensely beautiful, Evelyn develops a powerful love for Hugh Manson. She likes her independence and respects Cushing as her guardian, but feels intrigued by the lifestyles of younger people. She is impulsive and easily entranced.
- Hugh Manson- A young successful architect, described as handsome and bold. Born in Kentucky and earning his own fortune, Manson earns the love of Evelyn. Easily angered and highly driven, Manson finds himself in the middle of a murderous plan for revenge on Cushing.

=== Minor characters ===
- Wentworth Thayer- Despite his smarts, the son of Alice engages in reckless behaviors costing the family time, energy, and stress.
- William Rice- Friend of the Thayer's and Manson, this rich and indecisive young man introduces Evelyn to Manson. He wants to marry but cannot decide on whom to marry. When he does come up with a plan, someone else marries the woman he desires.
- Leonie- Servant of the Thayer's who eavesdrops on Alice and Evelyn's conversations and learns of Evelyn's love for Manson. She delivers a letter to Evelyn from Manson, which ultimately allows their marriage to occur. She becomes Evelyn and Manson's servant after their marriage. Evelyn finds Leonie dressed up in her things when she returns from New York without Manson and fires her after receiving information about Manson's journey. In the end of the novel, she becomes a singer.
- Mrs. Archer- Friend of Cushing, she helps Alice when her family needs support. She throws a party in which Evelyn and Manson kiss, and where Alice announces Evelyn and Cushing's engagement.
- Captain Pennock- Captain of the Adelaide, the ship Manson sails on to South America. He suffers from "inopportune intoxication" (178) and is drunk on ship during the hurricane.
- Nelson- First mate of the ship Adelaide who commits suicide on the lifeboat.
- Campbell- Doctor on the ship that picks up Manson and Cushing from their escape from the island.
- Dr. Silva- Brazilian surgeon that restores Manson's sight.
- Sister Laurentine- American nurse caring for Manson and Wentworth in the Brazilian hospital.

== Critical reception and influence on Chesnutt's career ==
=== Initial manuscript ===
Evelyn's Husband was an unpublished manuscript written by Chesnutt, later published in 2005 by the University of Mississippi. A rejection letter from McClure Phillips in 1903 puts perspective on the writing of the novel. The Marrow of Tradition, commonly regarded as one of Chesnutt's most successful works, was published just two years earlier, in 1901, by Houghton Mifflin. The social club, The Rowfant Club, rejected Chesnutt's application for membership in 1902, likely due to race. Presumably, after negative criticism to his racial novel The Marrow of Tradition, and denial from the Rowfant Club due to race, Chesnutt returned to "the genre of the white-life novel, in which African Americans write exclusively about white experience" (v) in order to gain success in the literary world again. The rejection letter from McClure Phillips, written by Wittner Bynner, comments on this; "The relevant portion of the letter reads, 'I doubt that Evelyn's Husband will do your reputation much good. It might be published to fair advantage, perhaps; but we are convinced that in leaving your earlier work . . . you have made a literary misstep. This sounds rather harsh, I am afraid. I don't want you to think for a minute that we are not appreciative of the many excellent and charmingly written passages. . .' (Bynner). Bynner clearly thought that Chesnutt should have been writing exclusively race fiction" (228). Due to this rejection, Chesnutt abandoned his novel, leaving the manuscript unfinished after his death in 1932.

=== Publication ===
The University Press of Mississippi published this manuscript, under the editor of Matthew Wilson. Few criticisms of the novel were published after its release, likely due to its publication out of historical context. Published over a hundred years after written, this novel does not have the same social and political influence as it would have in 1903. However, a few scholars remarked on the novel. Wilson himself claims, "It is one of the most radical and baroque of Chesnutt's eccentric fictions. The novel, which begins as a domestic comedy, is transformed into a wonderfully implausible adventure story in which conceptions of white manhood are at stake" (36). He also argues that this book gives insight into Chesnutt's development as a writer, when analyzing the context in which he wrote it. He states, "The publication of this novel allows us to understand more clearly Chesnutt's development as a writer; it provides the intermediate step between The Marrow of Tradition and The Colonel's Dream, and allows us to see how he became the writer who manipulated genre in ways he did in The Colonel's Dream. Finally, the publication of Evelyn's Husband greatly expands our sense of Chesnutt the writer; in this novel, free of responsibility of confronting the race question in the United States, we see Chesnutt at serious play" (xvi).

Others review this novel very differently from Wilson. William Andrews harshly claims this "unquestionably [is] the worst of his seven unpublished novels" (130). He goes on to say that Chesnutt failed 'to find... that spark of conviction and serious purpose which appears in his race fiction" (122). This seems to agree with Bynner's original criticism of the manuscript. Without race as a central point in his novel, critics felt that Chesnutt's work lost much of its value. Ryan Simmons shows dislike of the novel as well, especially pertaining to the final two-thirds, remarking, "The remainder of the novel is disappointing but does reveal some interesting facets of Chesnutt's project. . . He now attempts to imaginatively to discern what the result would be of removing the element of the social. That is he switches from a realist critique of romance to an exploration of what human nature is like in an imagined native state" (42). This statement agrees with Wilson's review of this novel as an experimental piece for Chesnutt. Simmons likes the traditionally realist aesthetic in the beginning, but as the novel shifts to its impractically coincidental portion, Simmons loses interest. He does, however, enjoy the contemplation of human nature that Chesnutt deliberates with throughout the end of the novel. He elaborates on this, saying, "A degree of coincidence, from the realist's perspective, is not only allowable, but unavoidable; the question is how, and to what degree, coincidence is employed. And, although Chesnutt's use of coincidence in Evelyn's Husband stretches beyond reason's and realism's limits, one must keep in mind that, at this point, he is learning and extending his craft. . . Evelyn's Husband, however, once again reveals Chesnutt's distrust that realism could play the bills" (44-5). This last statement explains much of the strangeness and switching of styles seen throughout the book. Chesnutt tried employing different styles to fit a changing literary market. Realism and racism were not working for him, especially seen through the tragic reviews of The Marrow of Tradition. Thus, Chesnutt attempted different styles, straying from race and realism, to appeal to more audiences. Overall, these limited reviews for the novel find it strange and complex, switching between many styles and themes.

=== White-life novel ===
Evelyn's Husband fits under the term 'white-life novel,' a phrase used by Matthew Wilson to describe Chesnutt's genre of work describing the life of white Americans. Chesnutt, trying to achieve mass success, strayed from his portrayal of racial issues and instead tried to reach white audiences by depicting their life and their central social issues. Simmons argues that his distancing from racial issues stems from his "little confidence in his own ability to channel this reaction in productive directions. Thus, his commentary on race remains covert. Evelyn's Husband is concerned with the reliability of physical and hereditary factors as determiners of character, though it barely mentions race directly" (52). Straying from race in order to gain success with white audiences ultimately causes Chesnutt more harm than good. White audiences neglected this style, viewing it with a "sense of imaginative trespass, as if, in the view of white readers, African American writers have had no right to represent white-life exclusively because to grant that right would be to acknowledge the permeability of the color line" (vii). Underlying racism dominated views of Chesnutt's works, whether they exposed racial topics or not. Wilson elaborates on this, remarking, "If nothing else, they represent his consciousness of the degree to which race, even when it is not the ostensible topic of conversation, subtly permeates American discourse; race is never more than an inch beneath the surface." (55).
