= Gertrude Sanborn =

American writer

- Born: Anna Gertrude Sanborn; December 20, 1881; Milwaukee, Wisconsin
- Died: July 17, 1928 (aged 46)
- Occupations: Journalist; short story writer; novelist
- Relatives: Alden Sprague Sanborn (grandfather)

Gertrude Sanborn (December 20, 1881 – July 17, 1928) was an American journalist, short story writer, and novelist.

== Biography ==
Born in Milwaukee, Wisconsin, Anna Gertrude Sanborn was the daughter of Perley Roddis Sanborn (1854–1936) and Jane White Robbins (1849–1946). Her paternal grandfather was Dane County Judge Alden Sprague Sanborn.

Sanborn was a reporter for The Milwaukee Journal from 1915 to 1917. Her first two books were Blithesome Jottings: A Diary of Humorous Days (1918) and I, Citizen of Eternity: A Diary of Hopeful Days (1920). Each were published by the Four Seas Company, a Boston publishing house that released the works of many important modernist writers such as Gertrude Stein and William Faulkner. In I, Citizen of Eternity, Sanborn penned an optimistic riposte to Mary MacLane's 1917 memoir I, Mary MacLane. Sanborn's third novel, Toy (1922), is the coming-of-age story of Antoinette Ashworth, a wealthy socialite from Chicago.

Sanborn attained significant notoriety for her novel Veiled Aristocrats (1923) which featured an interracial romance set partly in Chicago. Published by Carter G. Woodson's Associated Publishers, it dealt with race relations more directly than was fashionable at the time. The novel belonged to the genre of "passing" stories wherein light-complexioned African Americans passed for white. The novel's title was borrowed in 1932 by pioneer African American filmmaker Oscar Micheaux for his movie Veiled Aristocrats. It was a remake of his 1924 silent film House Behind the Cedars based on the novel by that name by Charles Chesnutt. Micheaux's Veiled Aristocrats also focused on "passing" and interracial relationships, but owed more to its source in Chesnutt than to Sanborn's novel.

Anna Gertrude Sanborn is memorialized at Forest Home Cemetery in Milwaukee.

== Books ==
- Blithesome Jottings: A Diary of Humorous Days (1918). Boston: The Four Seas Company.
- I, Citizen of Eternity: A Diary of Hopeful Days (1920). Boston: The Four Seas Company.
- Toy (1922). New York: M.A. Donahue & Co.
- Veiled Aristocrats (1923). Washington D.C.: Associated Publishers.
