= A Business Career =

Novel by Charles W. Chesnutt

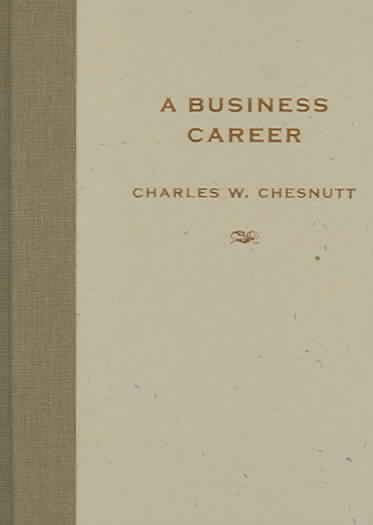
- First edition cover
- Author: Charles Chesnutt
- Language: English
- Published: 2005 by University Press of Mississippi
- Publication place: United States
- Media type: Print (Hardback)
- Pages: 218 pp
- ISBN: 978-1-5780-6761-9
- OCLC: 57002305
- Dewey Decimal: 813.4
- LC Class: PS1292.C6

A Business Career is a novel by African-American author Charles Chesnutt that features the life of a "new woman" of the late 19th century; she enters the world of business instead of embracing the traditional roles of women. It explores a failed romance between two successful upper-class members. A family’s vendetta against the man who allegedly destroyed the family's fortune is revealed to be mistaken. The novel was unusual for its time as Chesnutt wrote only about white society.

The book was completed in 1890 but Chesnutt, who had published only a few short stories by then, was unable to interest a publisher in it. The book's depiction of white society may have contributed to that failure. Editor Walter Hines Page, who declined the book, nevertheless encouraged Chesnutt in his writing and later published other works by him.

Since the late 20th century, there has been a revival of interest in Chesnutt. This novel was published posthumously in 2005 with an introduction and editing by Matthew Wilson.

== Plot summary ==
The story takes place in 1890s in the Midwest city of Groveland (critics consider this a fictional stand-in for Cleveland, where Chesnutt lived). At the Truscott Refining Company, the male stenographer has just been fired. Stella Merwin fills in temporarily; she has already learned shorthand. When an opportunity opens up, she stays in the job longer than intended. The company is owned by the man whom her family believes has destroyed its reputation and honor.

Stella Merwin's father, Henry, was a very successful man in the oil refining business, providing the Merwin family with status and a life of wealth. At the peak of his success, he hit financial troubles. These led to the loss of the family fortune as well as his death, attributed to heart disease. Before his death, Merwin assured his family: his wife, daughter Stella and son George, that they would be taken care of financially by his profitable investments. He directed them to see his most trusted employee, Wendell Truscott for assistance in the matter, as Merwin had given him related papers. With the loss of their wealth, the Merwins must change their lives. They move from the city to a small town where they lived off a small annual income produced by the estate and additional money earned from Mrs. Merwin’s writing career. This was enough money to give Stella a strong education, but a far cry from what the family was used to during their good times. Mrs. Merwin blames the family’s financial difficulties on Wendell Truscott because she believes that he ruined her husband and, stole money from him, and took over his company.

Because of the complicated history between Wendell Truscott and the Merwin family, Stella Merwin takes her job under the false name Miss Smith. She wants the job in order to lean more about Truscott, whom she has been told to despise as the man who caused her family's financial downfall. Stella comes to swift judgments about her employer. She concludes that he is a cold-hearted boss who does not care about establishing relationships with his employees, but also that he is a very smart, savvy businessman who efficiently gets missions accomplished. Stella quickly takes a liking to her job, which starts out with her transcribing letters dictated by Truscott. Impressed with her performance, Truscott increases her responsibilities; he entrusts her to write letters according to his direction. instead of copying what the proprietor says, she gains his trust enough to write letters on her own, and gives her the charge of reviewing the financial books daily.

Mrs. Merwin is thrilled that Stella is working for The Truscott Refining Company. She does not care that Stella is getting great experience in the business world and her schooling in shorthand is being put to good use; instead, she wants Stella to use her position in the office to infiltrate Truscott's files to find evidence that he committed fraud against Henry Merwin to restore the family to their previous position of wealth. Stella struggles slightly with the moral implications of betraying her boss, but she will do anything to help her family leading to her decision to find the incriminating documents. The mother visits her daughter and as they walk around the city she comments on how the rich residents made their money insisting that they did so in a dishonorable fashion. The only people that Mrs. Merwin believes amassed their fortune nobly are her husband and her friend Matilda Wedderburn.

Besides for being Mrs. Merwin's old friend, Matilda Wedderburn is the love interest of Wendell Truscott. Matilda inherited great wealth from her father, and is a leader in literary and musical circles. She is a very independent woman whose only reason to marry is for true love because she has everything else on her own. Miss Weddburn and Truscott have known each other forever, but their courtship intensifies as they engage in activities together such as going to the theater. Matilda says Wendell is as close to her perfect man that she has ever met. She invites him to her home for dinner hoping that he will ask her to marry him there. Wendell has the same feelings for Miss Wedderburn so he writes a response to Matilda’s invitation that implies that he is planning on asking her to marry him that night; however, Truscott notices that his stenographer Miss Smith (Stella) is a beautiful young lady. He changes his mind when, "It occurred to him as he sat there, that perhaps a woman might be young in years, and yet not immature in mind, and that youth might possess a charm that maturity would lack." Truscott tears up the letter and instead writes a less passionate response. When that night comes the two are in an intimate setting in which Matilda expects Wendell to ask her to marry her, but instead he abruptly leaves crushing her hopes of marriage. Later on Miss Wedderburn visits the office of The Truscott Refining Company where she recognizes Miss Smith as the Merwin’s daughter, and she suspects that the young stenographer is the reason Truscott has a change of heart.

While reviewing the daily reports Stella notices that something is inconsistent in the books, so she decides to look into the matter on a Sunday when nobody will be in the office. After reviewing the books she concludes that the bookkeeper Mr. Ross has stolen $20,000 from the company. While Stella is still there Ross comes in and finds the ledger on his desk along with a piece of paper that Stella had written on. Mr. Ross finds Stella hiding in the closet and knocks her out. Stella wakes up locks in a wardrobe; luckily she is able to escape by climbing through the roof of the wardrobe so she can go alert Mr. Truscott about Mr. Ross’s transgression. Truscott is very pleased that she discovers this crime, but by the time they inform the authorities Ross leaves town and makes it all the way to a South American country where there is no extradition.

The next Sunday Stella again visits the office in order to search for the documents believed to because this time in search of the documents that will restore her family's wealth. Stella believes the necessary papers are in the safe in Truscott's private office that she access to because of his special trust in her. She looks through the safe without success, but she knows there is a special compartment with an additional lock. She gets the key from Truscott's desk and successful finds the papers in the locked compartment. At the same time Stella is in the office, Truscott goes to a dinner at the Country Club hosted by General Farwell. At the dinner the wealthy guests receive news from Wall Street that a bank in London collapsed and a financial crisis is imminent. Truscott is hit hard by the crisis and as a result cannot get banks to lend him money for the big project he has been working on thereby putting it on the verge of failure. Stella reviews the papers in her boarding house that night. The papers show the scheme that her father was planning that is very similar to Truscott's current endeavor revolutionizing the oil refining industry. The papers show $2 million in stock that her father has investment in his new company Universal Subterranean Development Company. She believes that this is the evidence that will prove their wealth; however, Stella then sees through the documents how her father's plan failed because of an economic collapse and the failures of his unscrupulous business partners. This proves that Wendell Truscott never stole from her father; it was Henry Merwin’s own fault that the family lost its fortune. Stella's findings cement the family's place outside the upper class of society and prevent Mrs. Merwin's dream of returning to their previous life impossible. She also learns that the income the family has been receiving was not generated by the Merwin estate but actually is Truscott's charity for the family. Stella returns the stolen papers to Mr. Truscott accompanied by a letter explaining her true identity as well as giving him her reason for resignation of the position. She thanks him for his generosity to the family and apologizes for taking advantage of the trust he showed her.

The Truscott Refining Company is at the brink of collapse because the company needs $200,000 that it owes to its creditors. Luckily Matilda Wedderburn comes to Truscott’s rescue, even though he put their romance to an end, by offering her good friend the money that he desperately needs therefore saving the company.

Stella moves back to Cloverdale leaving Groveland in her rear-view mirror because she wants to forget about her experience working for Wendell Truscott as much as possible. She soon receives a letter from Truscott asking her to come back to work because he cannot find anyone who did as good a job as she did, but more importantly he wants her to come back because she loves him. In the letter Truscott says, "Come back to me, dear child, or let me come to you, and we will part no more forever, as long as we both shall live."

== Characters ==
Stella Merwin (Miss Smith): The protagonist of the novel is a "new woman" of the late 19th century who pursues a life outside the traditional roles of wife and mother. As a junior in college, she learns shorthand, which enables her to secure a job as a stenographer. She works for The Truscott Refining Company with the objective of trying to find documents to restore her family’s wealth.

Wendell Truscott: The wealthy proprietor of the Truscott Refining Company whom the Merwin family blames for their financial ruin. He is a crafty businessman. It is revealed that he never betrayed his mentor Henry Merwin, but provided for his family.

Mrs. Paxton: Stella’s mentor who gets her the job at Truscott Refining. She guides Stella in the business world and becomes a friend.

Mr. Peters: The former stenographer, fired for tardiness due to excessive drinking.

Mr. Ross: The bookkeeper of Truscott Refining, who steals $20,000 from the company, but escapes to South America. Stella Merwin's judgment of him is proved true by events.

Matilda Wedderburn: A beautiful, wealthy woman being courted by Wendell Truscott. Her hopes of marrying him end when he "falls for" Stella Merwin. As a friend, she loans Truscott money to save the company.

Mrs. Merwin: The mother of Stella and George, and wife of Henry Merwin. The widow has trouble dealing with her decline in status and yearns to return to her high place in society

George Merwin: Stella’s brother, who also lives and works in Groveland. George has a gambling problem and falls into debt, leading to his arrest. He is saved by a stranger, revealed to be Wendell Truscott, whom the Merwin family considers an enemy. He is sent to a ranch in the West for rehabilitation.

== Themes ==
=== The new women ===
The major theme of this novel is the emergence of the new woman in American society at the turn of the century. Mrs. Merwin exemplifies the traditional female role as a mother and wife, but Stella Merwin pursues higher education. Her schooling allows her to get a job in the business world that pays a substantial salary. Stella has the financial independence to thrive without relying on a husband. During this period, the number of women working in offices, previously limited to men, was on the rise. Gradually women replaced men as clerks and stenographers.

=== Status ===
Chesnutt explores the financial inequality in the structure of society. This era was known for the vast disparity in wealth between the classes, as the upper class lived in luxurious mansions with many servants and enjoyed the theatre, but the lower class struggled through life by working long hours in a factory or office. The Merwins family's drastic decline in financial standing is similar to that of the title character in William Dean Howells' novel The Rise of Silas Lapham, now considered a literary classic. Chesnutt explores Mrs. Merwin's difficulty as a beleaguered widow, no longer in the upper class.

=== Realism ===
Chesnutt wrote a novel of Realism, portraying society, as was the major form of his time. He did not use a high style of elaborate language or refer to the mythical characters popular in an earlier generation. The novel effectively captures the business world by describing The Truscott Refining Company’s inner workings.

=== Romance ===
The novel follows the form of a romance, as Matilda Wedderburn and Wendell Truscott engage in a courtship. This fails after he falls for his young stenographer. The courtship is highlighted by nights out at the theatre and dinner parties with the family. It omits the sexual component prevalent in modern courtship and portrayed in current literature. The romantic plot was also featured in Howells' novel, The Rise of Silas Lapham.

== Context ==
When Chesnutt completed his novel in 1890, he was unable to find a publisher for it. At the time he had published only a few short stories set in the South, recounting the culture of slave life on plantations. Although Houghton Mifflin chose not to publish the novel, editor Walter Hines Page advised Chesnutt, "You will doubtless be able to find a publisher, and my advice to you is decidedly to keep trying till you do find one." Page encouraged Chesnutt in his career, and later Houghton Mifflin published other works by him.

Twenty-first century scholar Matthew Wilson believes Chesnutt may have been trying to appeal in this work to white readers, who made up most of the market for literature. Chesnutt, along with Paul Laurence Dunbar, was one of the first African-American writers to write in the "white life" genre, to portray only white characters and white society. Dunbar’s novel, The Uncalled, was published in 1901, but failed to sell successfully.

Matthew Wilson says about African-American authors at the turn of the 20th century:

"Very little expressed interest in representations of whiteness in the black imagination. Black cultural and social critics allude to such representations in their writing, yet only a few have dared to make explicit those perceptions of whiteness that they think will discomfort or antagonize readers."

He describes Chesnutt and Dunbar as pushing the prescribed limits of race in their writings.

Charles Chesnutt viewed his work differently than most in terms of its racial implications. After receiving an award from the NAACP in the early 1900s, Chesnutt said he was "Not a Negro writing about Negroes, but a human being writing about other human beings." He did not see color in his writing. But, many critics considered African Americans to be inferior writers who had to stay in their own "league". At the time, books about the antebellum South were popular. It was a time of reconciliation between the North and South, and members of the Northern literary establishment were interested in black writers who portrayed the slavery years.

Chesnutt published his novels A House Behind the Cedars (1900) and The Marrow of Tradition (1901), following his success with two short story collections in 1899. They addressed issues of racial inequality and racial mixing. But The Marrow of Tradition went further, featuring a range of white characters, who included an elite white family, as well as a black family of mixed race. Young women in the two families were half-sisters who had the same white father, a man of the elite class. Chesnutt also addressed competition among classes of whites by the late 19th century, as some lower-class men achieved new wealth and political power. Based on the background to North Carolina's disfranchisement of blacks in the late 1890s and events of the 1898 Wilmington massacre, in which whites conducted a coup d'état of the elected city government, the novel was described by William Dean Howells as "bitter."

It is not known whether Chesnutt tried to find another publisher for A Business Career, but it was among his six unpublished manuscripts found at the time of his death. In his introduction to this novel, editor Mathew Wilson says, "African American writers have had no right to represent white-life exclusively because to grant that right would be to acknowledge the permeability of the color line". Wilson believes that Chesnutt has still not received the recognition he deserves for this pioneering effort in crossing the color line to write about white society.

== Critical reception ==
When it was published in 2005 over a century after it was written, A Business Career received little attention from critics or readers. One of the first of its kind, the novel has faded to the edge of American Literature.

== Bibliography ==
- Chesnutt, Charles W., A Business Career, ed. Matthew Wilson and Marjan Van Schaik, Jackson: University of Mississippi, 2005. Print.
- Wilson, Matthew. Whiteness in the Novels of Charles W. Chesnutt, Jackson: University of Mississippi, 2004.
