= Veiled Aristocrats =

1932 film

- Film poster
- Directed by: Oscar Micheaux
- Written by: Oscar Micheaux
- Produced by: Oscar Micheaux
- Starring: Lorenzo Tucker; Laura Bowman
- Distributed by: Micheaux Film Corporation
- Release date: May 16, 1932
- Country: United States
- Language: English

Veiled Aristocrats is a 1932 American pre-Code race film written, directed, produced and distributed by Oscar Micheaux. The film deals with the theme of "passing" by mixed-race African Americans to avoid racial discrimination. It is a remake of The House Behind the Cedars (1927), based on a novel by the same name published in 1900 by Charles W. Chesnutt. Micheaux may have borrowed the new title from a 1923 novel by Gertrude Sanborn.

== Plot ==
John Walden, a light-skinned African-American lawyer, returns to his family in North Carolina after being away for 20 years. Walden has passed as white and been successful. He discovers domestic turmoil: his mother is trying to dissuade his sister Rena, who is also light-skinned, from being romantically involved with Frank Fowler (Carl Mahon), a dark-skinned African-American businessman. With his mother's blessing, Walden suggests that Rena abandon Fowler and move with him to another part of the city, where she could pass for white.

After Rena reluctantly agrees, her brother sets her up in a fancy home with African-American servants, who are initially unaware of Rena's African ancestry. Rena is pursued by a white high-class man who proposes marriage. Becoming uncomfortable with the situation, Rena tells her brother that she is a "negress" and is "tired of being a liar and a cheat". Rena reunites with Frank and they elope.

== Production ==
Veiled Aristocrats was Oscar Micheaux's second film adaptation of the 1900 novel The House Behind the Cedars by author Charles W. Chesnutt. In 1927 he produced it as a silent film (no print of that film is known to exist today).

In his 1932 adaptation, Micheaux altered the Chesnutt story by having Rena and Frank marry, and allowing them a happy ending. (Chesnutt's book ends with Rena's death). Micheaux's screenplay is often blunt in its exploration of color lines within the African-American community; at one point John says: "I've heard, right on the street, a coal black Negro declares he loves her!"

Micheaux shot much of Veiled Aristocrats at his mother-in-law's home in Montclair, New Jersey. Lorenzo Tucker, who played John Walden, was a popular leading man of the race film genre. He was dubbed the "black Valentino" because of his striking good looks. Laura Bowman was the leading lady in several of Micheaux's films during the 1930s, including Ten Minutes to Live (1932) and Murder in Harlem (1935).

== Surviving copy ==
Although the complete film has been lost, a 48-minute print was located and preserved. It was released on DVD as part of the set "Pioneers of African-American Cinema" by Kino-Lorber in July 2016, and telecast on Turner Classic Movies on July 24, 2016. The original film's running time is unknown. Most of the final ten minutes of the surviving incomplete version consists of musical numbers performed by Rena's house servants, including a rendition of the song "River, Stay Away from My Door".

== See also ==
- List of incomplete or partially lost films
