= The Colonel's Dream =

1905 novel by Charles W. Chesnutt

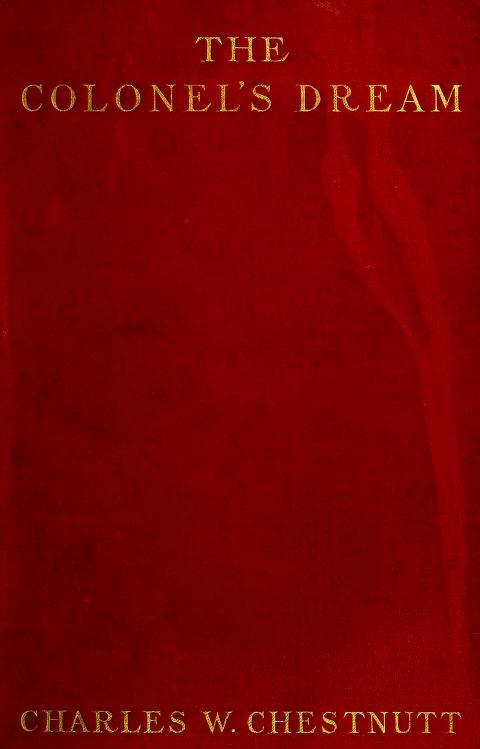
- First edition cover, 1905
- Author: Charles W. Chestnutt
- Publisher: Doubleday, Page & Company
- Publication date: 1905
- Pages: 310
- Preceded by: The Marrow of Tradition

The Colonel's Dream is a novel written by the African-American author Charles W. Chesnutt. The novel is published by Doubleday, Page, & Co. in 1905. The Colonel's Dream portrays the continuing oppression and racial violence prominent in the Southern United States after the American Civil War.

The Colonel's Dream concerns Colonel Henry French and his attempt to refine Clarendon, North Carolina, the southern city in which he grew up, into a racially and socially equal society from the strictly segregationist ways of its past.

The novel portrays the characters' intertwined lives through Charles Chesnutt's use of melodramatic subplots and provides a larger picture of life in post-Civil War North Carolina where black people as not given the same opportunities, offered the same fair wages, or treated fairly. In the novel, it is shown how white people have a general "fear of 'nigger domination'" specifically in politics, possibly giving reason for black oppression.

It is the last novel by Chesnutt to be published in his lifetime.

== Dedication ==
To the great number of those who are seeking, in whatever manner or degree, from near at hand or far away, to bring the forces of enlightenment to bear upon the vexed problems which harass the South, this volume is inscribed, with the hope that it may contribute to the same good end. If there be nothing new between its covers, neither is love new, nor faith, nor hope, nor disappointment, nor sorrow. Yet life is not the less worth living because of any of these, nor has any man truly lived until he has tasted of them all.

== Plot summary ==
The novel begins with Colonel Henry French and his partners selling their company, making the colonel financially independent. He decides to head back south with his son, Phil. He intends to stay for only a couple of months, but once he arrives, he remembers with nostalgia the landscape, the building structures, and his youth in his hometown. He runs into his old slave, Peter French, who is finding it difficult to make a living due to his skin color and age under the post-war conditions.

During his stay, the Colonel sees continuing economic isolation and repression of the black population and is bothered by the racism that is still very prominent in Clarendon. The editor of the local newspaper talked to him about Clarendon having "so many idle, ignorant Negroes that something must be done to make them work, or else they'll steal, and to keep them in their place, or they would run over us".

It became evident to the Colonel that there was a racial problem in Clarendon. When the Colonel visits a black school, he hears from a black school teacher, Mr. Henry Taylor, how unfairly the school system treats blacks by segregation and difference in condition of the schools. Behind most of this wrongdoing is William Fetters, a convict labor contractor in Clarendon who influences most affairs in the town. The Colonel takes on the injustice of Fetters and tries to change Clarendon into a more socially equal town.

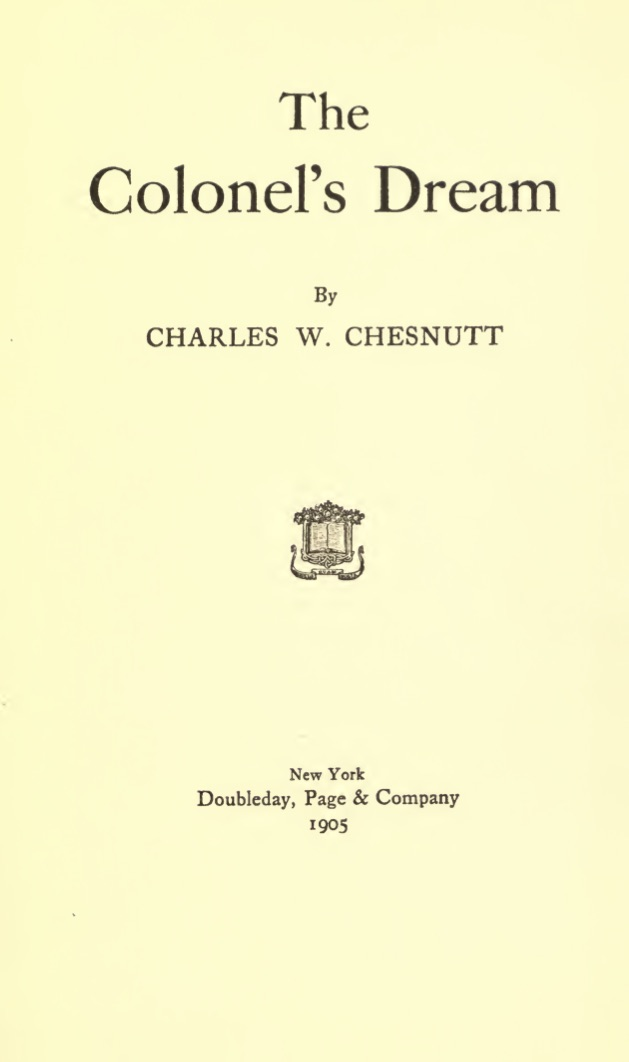
First edition title page of The Colonel's Dream (1905).

While in Clarendon, the Colonel also gets himself into some romantic problems. Graciella, after turning down Ben Dudley, tries to entice the wealthy Colonel to marry her. Colonel French proposes to Laura, deeming her as a loving mother to Phil. Laura accepts the proposal with happiness, but asks to keep the engagement secret for a while.

The Colonel tries to stimulate the economy of Clarendon by getting more black people working for him under better conditions and higher wages. The Colonel learns from one worker that blacks worked "from twelve to sixteen hours a day for fifteen to fifty cents". Driven by a desire for more equality between blacks and whites, he also pursues owning parts of Clarendon by purchasing additional properties, such as a run down cotton mill and his childhood home, for which he pays a mulatto barber named William Nichols well over the actual price. (Nichols was actually created from the image of Chesnutt's wife's father, who was also a barber.)

Filled with abhorrence for the strength and prominence of the white supremacy of his childhood town, the Colonel works to undo the efforts of William Fetters. The Colonel imagines building a library for the black population of ex-slaves as well as fixing up white schools. However, Laura convinces him not to, reminding him of the violence that would come from white residents. As Laura predicted, the plans of the Colonel to reconstruct Clarendon are met with strong opposition and hostility.

Peter dies trying to save Phil from being hit by a train while chasing a cat on the train tracks. Phil dies soon after from his injuries. Phil requests to his father was he and Peter be buried in the same graveyard next to each other. In defense of Peter's burial in an all-white cemetery, the Colonel remarks how all men are seen as equal under God regardless of skin color.

After the burial, Peter's casket appears on the front lawn of the Colonel's house with a note from a group of white townspeople who refused social equality among the races, warning the Colonel to leave Clarendon. This incident discourages him further.

The schoolteacher tells the Colonel about Bud Johnson, a convict laborer working unlawfully under Mr. Fetters. After offering to pay for his freedom and being turned down by Mr. Fetters, the Colonel devises a plan to help Johnson escape. However, instead of escaping, Johnson tries to kill Mr. Fetters' son. After being found out, a mob of white racists lynches Johnson.

Nearing his death, Malcolm Dudley only has Viney at his side. Viney, having faked being mute for years, finally reveals that she can speak, telling Malcolm there was no gold to be found. She also reveals that she did this scheming to get back at him for having her whipped and lying about freeing her from slavery despite their romantic involvement when they were younger. Malcolm forgives her and passes away. Viney is found dead next to him as well. These mishaps finally cause the Colonel to see the hopelessness of trying to change the "violence, cruelty, and race hatred" of the South, and that segregation would always be ingrained.

All seems lost to the Colonel with his failed ventures. With his beloved son dead, there is no use in marrying Laura anymore. All that resulted from his presence in Clarendon was more violence and increased racial hatred. So, the Colonel returns to New York City and resumes his business with Mr. Kirby and Mrs. Jerviss, whom he ends up marrying instead.

Coincidentally, while on a train to Chicago on business, the Colonel runs into Henry Taylor. He tells the Colonel that he had become a Pullman car porter because he was compelled to escape the South. This implies that the only way for black people to escape the racial cruelty of the South was by fleeing from it and, in Henry Taylor's case, taking a lesser position in society.

== Main characters ==
- Colonel Henry French – a former high-ranking Confederate soldier in the Civil War and retired merchant
- Mr. Kirby, Mrs. Jerviss – his former partners at French and Company, Ltd. in New York City
- Philip French – the colonel's young son
- Peter French – the colonel's former slave
- Mrs. Treadwell – an old lady who lives leisurely
- Miss Laura Treadwell – daughter of Mrs. Treadwell
- Graciella Treadwell – granddaughter of Mrs. Treadwell
- Malcolm Dudley – a treasure-seeker who is in search of buried gold
- Ben Dudley – Malcolm's nephew desperate to win Graciella's hand in marriage
- Viney – Dudley's mulatto housekeeper since she was a child
- William Fetters – a former plantation overseer and black convict labor contractor
- Barclay Fetters – William's son
- Bud Johnson – a black convict laborer
- Caroline – Johnson's wife
- Henry Taylor – a freeman's schoolmaster
- William Nichols – a mulatto barber
- Haynes – a constable

== Themes ==
The primary theme of The Colonel's Dream is the strength of racial prejudice and white supremacy that overcame the South after the Civil War where black oppression was still clearly present. The Colonel's Dream uses the story of a man who wants to return to his childhood home of Clarendon, North Carolina and make a new living there to illustrate the racial problems that pervaded the South during the beginning of the 20th century.

"The art of The Colonel's Dream, however, lies in Charles W. Chesnutt's greater willingness and ability to broach a radical solution to White violence in a New South setting". Throughout the novel, it is easy to understand the "social inequalities and political injustice" that thrived in Clarendon, North Carolina as a representation of the South as a whole. Chesnutt dramatically portrays the hardships and violence that plagued the deeply segregated South at the time.

Throughout, the novel illustrates that after the Civil War, Blacks remained low in social ranking performing menial work. Socio-economic problems made the Southern situation even worse. For example, white people of Clarendon were unwilling to allow black people education with the educational system as a whole completely worn down. Another example is how unfairly the black people were being treated in not being given the same wages as white people who worked the same jobs.

A major theme that becomes evident at the end of the novel is the hopelessness of trying to change black oppression in the South, a theme Chesnutt shares with his former mentor Albion Tourgée, author of A Fool's Errand whose hero Colonel Comfort Servosse is by and large replicated as Colonel Henry French in Chesnutt's novel.

Colonel French is the image of a man who Charles Chesnutt would have to reform the South. "Charles Chesnutt also portrays his own colonel as racially ambivalent, supporting blacks and a progressive New South on the one hand, while also needing romantic, old South racism on the other".

Colonel French is a man who once fought for the South but saw a more free and equal society when he moved north to New York City after the Civil War. He represented the northern force that would attempt to bring justice to the South. However, in the end, it is hopelessness and failure that prevail in an uncorrectable South.

Other themes related to the post-Civil War South emerge through Chesnutt's use of melodramatic subplots such as the "melodramatic subplot involving interracial love and lost inheritance" with Malcolm Dudley searching for gold and having a romantic history with his mulatto housekeeper Viney. This subplot illustrates the theme of how love between the two different races was forbidden and looked down upon. Malcolm Dudley's search for buried treasure also shows how desperate people were to escape the poverty of the South.

== Critical reception ==
The Colonel's Dream is regarded as one of the novels that led to the end of Charles Chesnutt's career due to poor sales. Even Chesnutt accepted The Colonel's Dream as a failure, as he wrote in one letter to a Mr. Benjamin G. Brawley on July 29, 1914, that the book "was not a pronounced success".

There were many "typographical errors" in the first few printings of the novel that both Chesnutt and the publishing company of Doubleday, Page, & Co. missed, including misspelling of characters' names and a misspelling on the cover. This may have contributed to weak sales. It is known that fewer copies of The Colonel's Dream were sold than Chesnutt's best-known novel, The Marrow of Tradition (1901), which sold fewer than four thousand copies.
