= Plantation tradition =

Plantation tradition is a genre of literature based in the Southern United States that is heavily nostalgic for antebellum times. The ideology is that of the Lost Cause of the Confederacy, though this specific genre is often called "The Plantation Myth."

The decades before the American Civil War saw several works idealizing the plantation, such as John Pendleton Kennedy's 1832 The Swallow Barn. However, plantation tradition became more popular in the late-nineteenth century as a reaction against slave narratives like those of Frederick Douglass, and abolitionist novels like Uncle Tom's Cabin. Prominent writers in the plantation tradition include Thomas Nelson Page (1853–1922) and Harry Stillwell Edwards (1855–1938). Other writers, especially African-American writers, soon satirized the genre: Charles W. Chesnutt's The Conjure Woman (1899), for example, "consciously evoke[d] the conventions of the plantation novel only to subvert them".
