= The Passing of Grandison =

1899 short story by Charles W. Chesnutt

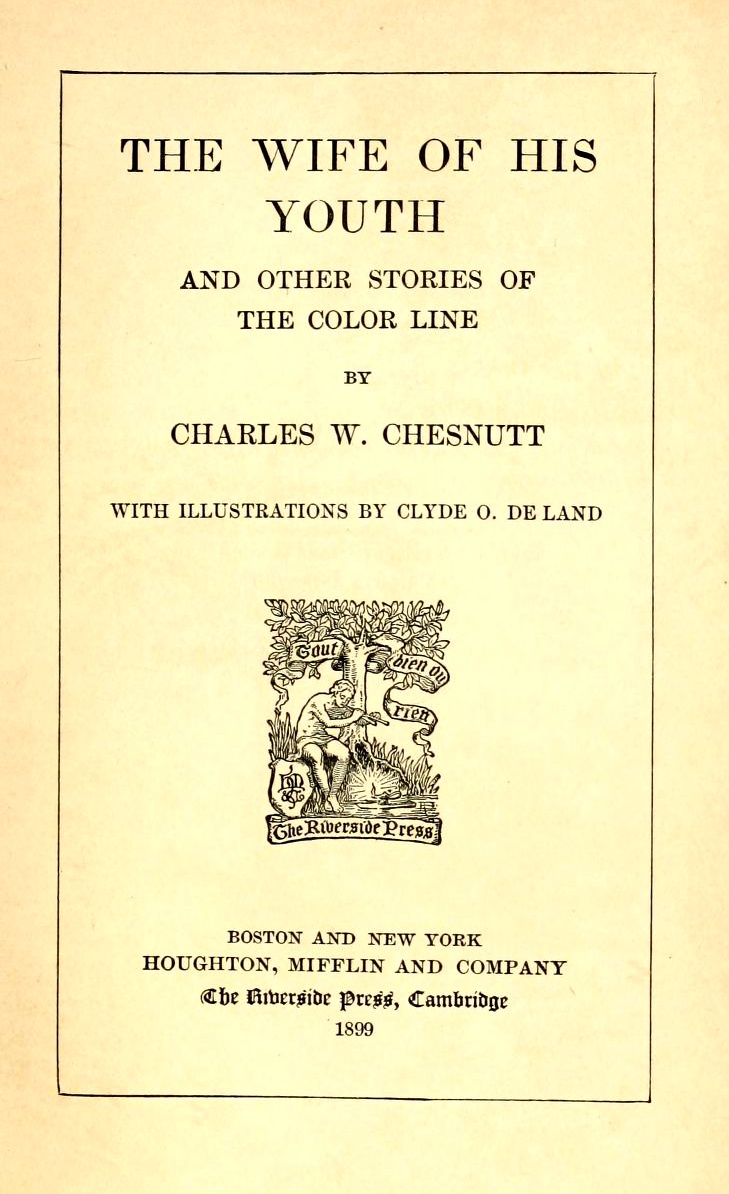
"The Passing of Grandison" was first collected in The Wife of His Youth and Other Stories of the Color Line (1899).

"The Passing of Grandison" is a short story written by Charles W. Chesnutt and published in the collection The Wife of His Youth and Other Stories of the Color-Line (1899). The story takes place in the United States in the early 1850s, at the time of anti-slavery sentiment and the abolitionist movement in the Northern United States, and after the passage of the Fugitive Slave Law of 1850.

In Chesnutt's story, the aspect of racial passing is addressed on both a narrative and textual level in order to illustrate a "destabilization of constructs of race, identity, and finally of textuality itself".

== Plot summary ==
"The Passing of Grandison" starts with a conversation between Dick Owens and Charity Lomax. Charity tells Dick that if he did something she considered heroic, she could be convinced to fall in love with him and marry him. For this reason, Dick decides to help one of the slaves of his father's plantation to escape to the North. He chooses this particular way to impress Charity because she admires the courage of a man from Ohio, who tried to help another man's slave gain freedom but was unsuccessful and, as a consequence, was jailed. The man died of a disease shortly after being imprisoned.

To achieve freeing one of his father's slaves, Dick decides to go on a trip north and take his slave Tom along; he is convinced Tom will use any opportunity to escape and Dick will achieve his goal very easily. However, Colonel Owens, Dick's father, is opposed to his son's being accompanied by Tom as he is convinced that the slave will escape and constitute a property loss. Instead he suggests that Dick take Tom's brother, Grandison. He suggests that his son ask Grandison about his status as a slave to ensure that he is trustworthy and will not try to escape.

Dick takes Grandison with him to New York City and Boston, and then to Niagara Falls, New York, where he even crosses to the Canadian side. (Great Britain had by then abolished slavery in Canada and other colonies in the Western Hemisphere.) Despite having numerous opportunities to escape, Grandison does not run away and refuses abolitionists' attempts to persuade him to flee into freedom. Dick decides to have Grandison kidnapped to get him out of view in order to appear to have helped the slave gain freedom when he reports back to Charity.

Four weeks after Dick Owens' return to his father's plantation in Kentucky and one week after his marriage to Charity Lomax, Grandison returned to the property. He was welcomed and celebrated as a loyal slave, as he confirmed Colonel Owens' positive understanding of slavery. The colonel gave Grandison a place as a house servant.

After about three weeks, Grandison and his family (his new wife, his parents and his three siblings) go missing. Colonel Owens' view on slavery is shaken when he discovers the slaves have escaped. He searches for the fugitives and last sees them on a small steamboat crossing Lake Erie toward Canada, where they will be free.

== Characters ==
- Grandison is the central character, a slave owned by Colonel Owens; he accompanies Dick Owens on a journey to the North.
- Dick Owens is the son of the Colonel; he takes Grandison on his travels with the intention of aiding him in escape in the North, to gain the love of Charity Lomax.
- Colonel Owens is a rich planter in Kentucky and the father of Dick Owens. He owns Grandison and Tom, among numerous other slaves.
- Charity Lomax is Dick Owens' lover, who encourages him to free a slave in order to gain her love.
- Tom is Grandison's enslaved brother on the same plantation
- Betty is an enslaved maid held by Col. Owens, who marries Grandison after his return from the North.

== Analyses and interpretations ==
=== Theme of passing on the narrative level ===
On the narrative level (between the characters of the short story), the theme of passing destabilizes binary oppositions of "appearance" and "reality", "good" and "bad slave", as well "master" and "mastered".

==== Grandison's performance of being a loyal slave ====
As the title announces, the theme of passing is a major issue in the short story, "The Passing of Grandison". The kind of passing addressed, however, is not racial passing (since the slave Grandison does not pass for white) or any other form of passing in the traditional sense. Rather, Grandison passes for a contented and devoted slave, who is therefore selected to accompany his master's son, Dick Owens, on a trip north. Grandison seems to have "adopted the racist discourse of the slave system", which Colonel Owens, in the story, describes as a "blissful relationship of kindly protection on the one hand, of wise subordination and loyal dependence on the other". Grandison's "performance," or masking, convinces the colonel, that "Grandison typified the best qualities possessed by his bondsmen: humility, loyalty, and servility".

In "The Mask as Theme and Structure: Charles W. Chesnutt's 'The Sheriff's Children' and 'The Passing of Grandison'", P. Jay Delmar lists four events in the story that highlight Grandison's successful masking: his dialogue with Colonel Owens, who interviews Grandison to see whether he was "abolitionist-proof" and suitable to accompany Dick on his journey. Grandison replied affirmatively to the colonel's question as to whether he believed himself to lead a better life than "free negroes", and confirmed the colonel's positive view of slavery.

Second, Grandison resisted Northern abolitionists' attempts to convince him to leave Owens. Grandison's repeated "pass[ing] on freedom" confirms and reinforces Dick's conviction that Grandison was a loyal slave. When Dick returned after a short trip to find that Grandison had not touched the money he had left him, Owens thought this meant that Grandison "... sensibly recognized his true place in the economy of civilization, and kept it with such touching fidelity". Grandison performed his role of being the loyal slave and appeared to have internalized his status as a slave.

Third, in response to Dick's decision on a trip across the Niagara River to Canada, Grandison appears to be afraid to lose sight of his master and worries that he "won' hab no marster, an' won't nebber be able to git back home no mo'". Grandison remains by his master's side or waits for him on Dick's instruction. Dick decides to have Grandison kidnapped in order to appear to have helped him achieve freedom, and returns alone to his plantation in Kentucky. Grandison again proves his loyalty by returning to his master's plantation.

Grandison's manner of speech is another way he encourages the trust of his masters. His use of dialect "marks his social and economic status" and "is mistaken for ignorance" by the white men.

==== Grandison's masking as Sambo ====
According to Joel Taxel, Grandison's performance in certain aspects conforms to historian Stanley Elkins' definition of the characteristics of the stereotypical plantation slave, the Sambo model, in Slavery: A Problem in American Institutional and Intellectual Life:

... docile but irresponsible, loyal but lazy, humble but chronically given to lying and stealing; his behavior full of infantile silliness and his talk inflated with childish exaggeration. His relationship with his master was one of utter dependence and childlike attachment: it was indeed this childlike quality that was the very key to his being.

The Sambo character was not a result of "internally controlled accommodation", but was a vital and reasonable adjustment to the hardships suffered, as well as an adjustment to the "dependency of a closed system". Taxel suggested that the Sambo character was an "externally imposed adjustment" by enslaved persons. In Taxel's opinion, the short story's focus on Grandison's performance of loyalty and childlike behavior reflected two elements characteristic of the Sambo type.

Grandison performs according to the Sambo-mask and thus the "false mask of Blackness", a mask responding to his master's expectations, with the goal of surviving and eventually escaping slavery. By his performance, Grandison first gains the trust of the Colonel and his son, and, secondly, confirms his master's opinion of his slave's having adopted the qualities most valued: "humility, loyalty, and servility".

==== Grandison's escape ====
Grandison conforms to expectations up until escaping with his family. According to Martha J. Cutter, this can be seen as the "passing away", or dying, of his performing "the persona of the passive, stupid, Sambo-like slave". Grandison does not escape on the Owens' son's journey and returns to the plantation to be reunited with his family. Wearing the mask of the Sambo character and thereby passing for "a contended, ignorant, childlike, happy slave who appears to believe the distorted visions of the world put forward by his white master" allows him to gain his master's trust and, through repeatedly proving his loyalty, he achieves his own and his family's freedom. Grandison's successful passing is the result both of his own efforts and of the shared belief by the Colonel and Dick Owens that "slavery is a sophisticated form of chivalry"; these elements help Grandison deceive them.

Kim Kirkpatrick suggests another reason for Grandison to adopt the Sambo-like character: Colonel Owens promises that he can marry Betty, the enslaved maid, after he returns if he has pleased the son. The promise of marriage to the woman he loves is used to reward Grandison, while the Colonel subtly uses Betty as a kind of hostage.

===== Grandison as a trickster =====
Grandison's deception of the colonel and Dick Owens by masking and performing the stereotypical Sambo can be compared to the trickster figure in African-American literature, African stories, and stories of the African diaspora.

The end of the short story shows that Grandison has been masking in order to gain freedom not only for himself but also for his family. He is "a trickster-like, multi-faceted individual emerges from behind the mask of the Sambo doll". Viktor Osinubi further explains that

the parallels between the adventures of a trickster figure and Grandison's tortuous scheme for freedom highlight the connection between Grandison's constructed presence in front of his powerful adversaries (his slave masters) and the African metaphysics of presence, in which veiling one's presence is an essential strategy for continued existence or the pursuit of freedom.

Grandison uses the colonel's belief that he has a secure knowledge of the behavior and culture of slaves by reconfirming it through "[t]otal subordination, veiled presence, and masked speech". He creates opportunities for subterfuge, and proves his loyalty by returning to the plantation. These reinforce the colonel's positive view of slavery and sense of Grandison's gratitude. Through "the reversal of polarities, particularly of the master-servant relationship, of truth and falseness, of knowledge and ignorance, and of autonomy and control," Grandison achieves freedom.

When the colonel realizes he has been tricked and that Grandison's behavior had been a performance, his view of slavery is shaken and his concepts of racial identity destabilized. To escape slavery, Grandison needed to act both as "a cunning resister of slavery" and as a Sambo at the same time.

===== Autonomy and freedom =====
As a slave, Grandison has constraints on his self-determination and freedom of action. But he enacts agency when he rejects Owens' attempt to help him acquire freedom, and later achieves freedom through his own actions and choices. In "The Passing of Grandison," the hierarchy between autonomy and control in the sense of lack of freedom is destabilized. Grandison chooses the means and time of his escape. As Grandison achieves freedom through his own actions, "his lack of autonomy does not disempower him". As a result, the attributes of the master and the slave classes are reversed:

In the new relationship that Chesnutt sets up, the bourgeois class of slave masters loses the attributes of knowledge and sophistication to the slave class, while the slave class liberates itself from the attributes of ignorance and naivety, effectively demonstrating that ignorance and naivety belong equally to the slave masters.

==== Colonel Owens's "reading" of Grandison ====
Colonel Owens is convinced he is able to "read" his slaves' minds and behavior, meaning to understand them and their views of slavery and their master. But, the ending reveals that the Colonel is "completely in the dark about what Grandison and the other slaves are really thinking, feeling, and doing". Grandison's performance deceives the colonel and enables the slave to escape with his family. As a result, the colonel's view on slavery is shaken, if not completely destroyed. His inability to understand and define his slaves in binary categories is revealed. Colonel Owens is deceived "by Grandison's mask of 'samboism'". After Grandison's "pass[ing] on to freedom" with his family, the colonel and his son are "silenced," as they are not allowed "any further speech in the story". In the last part of the text, Colonel Owens "reacts to his former slave rather than leading him" [emphasis in original].

=== Theme of passing on the textual level ===
On the textual level (between the text and the reader), passing also appears. The text passes for something that it is not, and thereby destabilizes the reader's "reading" of race, as well as changes the reader's approach to texts addressing racial issues. Along with the theme of passing on the narrative level, Chesnutt's short story "enact[s] a profound destabilization of constructs of race, identity, and finally of textuality itself". The text's passing for something it is not can be divided into four parts, according to the four parts of the short story.

The first part of the text passes for a "romance." The story's first sentence, "when it is said that it was done to please a woman, there ought perhaps to be enough said to explain anything; for what a man will not do to please a woman has yet to be discovered" suggests the text is about the relationship of a man and a woman, likely Dick Owens and Charity Lomax, since the story continues with a conversation between the two. It distracts the reader's focus on Grandison as the central character and the narrative of his escape. In addition, the text's narrative perspective diverts the reader from associating the text's story as one that criticizes slavery. Therefore, the voice of narration and viewpoint conceal the short story's focus.

The second and third sections pass as a "plantation tradition narrative". Martha J. Cutter argues, in reference to other critics, that "The Passing of Grandison" imitates and ridicules the tradition of the post-Civil War southern plantation school of writing that portrayed slavery as a "'benevolent' patriarchal institution". She explains that the short story refers to this school of writing by its portrayal of Grandison as a happy and contented slave. Grandison speaks in a dialect associated with slaves and serves his master loyally on his journey into the north of the United States and to Canada, not responding to Owens' efforts to encourage the slave to escape.

The fourth part passes for an inverted slave narrative. Grandison, having been kidnapped, returns to his master's plantation and is "keeping his back steadily to the North Star". In slave narratives, the fugitives follow the North Star in pursuit of freedom and are welcomed by abolitionists when they reach the northern states. Reversing the narrative, Grandison refuses abolitionists' offers of help, travels southward, and rejoins his slave master. The colonel rewards Grandison's loyalty by giving him a position with the house servants, and letting him tell his story of return to slavery. In this way, "freedom and happiness are associated with the South, not the North".

However, the last section of the final part reveals Grandison's true goal: the escape from slavery together with his new wife and family. The end reveals "Chesnutt's story for what it is: a story about an intelligent enslaved individual who desires and attains liberty not just for himself, but for the family he loves".

Some interpreters of the story see Grandison as coordinating with rather than rejecting aid from Northern abolitionists. Grandison only tells Colonel Owens that he refused the offer of help from abolitionists, but Chesnutt never provides dialogue between Grandison and the abolitionist Boston clergyman and Canadians he is seen talking with. Grandison's feigned loyalty would therefore be a means to keep the Colonel's guard down while he organizes with the Underground Railroad and Northern abolitionists his entire family's escape, for "not only does the trickster Grandison escape, but through meticulous coordination while up north he arranges for the escape of his entire extended family". Chesnutt indicates this coordination with abolitionists: "The magnitude of the escaping party begot unusual vigilance on the part of those who sympathized with the fugitives, and, strangely enough, the underground railroad seemed to have had its tracks cleared and signals set for this particular train."

=== Destabilization of categorical thinking ===
Chesnutt's story addresses racism and the limitation of defining individuals according to fixed categories. Through an "openness and instability of the system of signs," the short story suggests a destabilization of such categories that are used to define characterization according to race and racialization of an individual. "The Passing of Grandison" highlights that "binary categories and stereotypical ideologies ... limit our ability to see the complexity of any given racial or textual situation". Martha J. Cutter suggests that one possible goal of Chesnutt in this story is to raise the reader's awareness "not just of the complexity of race itself, but of the ideologies that create racist ways of thinking". Chesnutt's story criticizes the institution of slavery.

=== References to other people ===
In this story, Chesnutt alludes to other texts and people connected to African-American history. He uses forms of African oral traditions of storytelling, such as "spoken language", "hyperbole", and "signifying".

Grandison calls the colonel the "best marster any [n***er] ever had in dis worl'"; Cutter notes that this is similar to abolitionist Frederick Douglass's comment in his memoir, Narrative of the Life of Frederick Douglass, an American Slave (1845), in which he describes William Freeland as "the best master [he] ever had, till [he] became [his] own master". As the biography Frederick Douglass (1899) was published in the same year as The Wife of his Youth, Chesnutt very likely chose Grandison's words deliberately to allude to the full text of Douglass's phrase.

Cutter draws a connection between the choice of name for the enslaved hero of this story, as Charles Grandison Finney was a well-known Christian evangelist and abolitionist of the Antebellum period. Finney, an influential minister of the Jacksonian Era, is associated with a call for autonomy, equality and self-determination.
