= The Conjure Woman (film) =

1926 film by Oscar Micheaux

- Directed by: Oscar Micheaux
- Written by: Oscar Micheaux (screenplay); Charles W. Chesnutt (story)
- Produced by: Oscar Micheaux
- Production company: Micheaux Film
- Release date: 1926

The Conjure Woman is a 1926 silent film directed, written, produced and distributed by Oscar Micheaux. A race film featuring an African-American cast and catering to an African-American audience, it stars Evelyn Preer and Lawrence Chenault, with support from character actors Peter Verwayen, Alma Sewell and Sidney Easton. It is based on American writer Charles W. Chesnutt's 1899 short story collection of the same name. No print of the film has been located and it is presumed to be a lost film.
