= The House Behind the Cedars (book) =

1900 novel by Charles W. Chesnutt

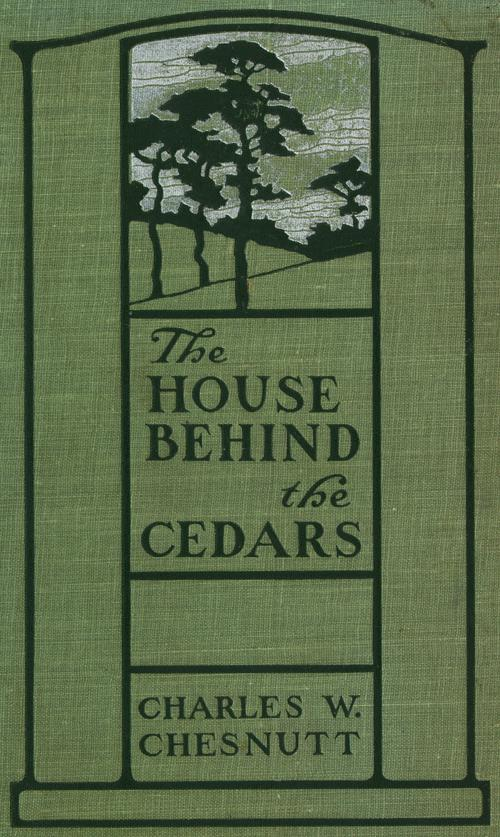
- First edition cover, 1900
- Author: Charles W. Chesnutt
- Publisher: Houghton, Mifflin and Company
- Publication date: 1900
- Preceded by: The Conjure Woman

The House Behind the Cedars is the first published novel by American author Charles W. Chesnutt. It was published in 1900 by Houghton, Mifflin and Company. The story occurs in North Carolina and South Carolina a few years following the American Civil War. Rena Walden, a young woman of mixed white and Black ancestry, leaves home to join her brother, who has migrated to a new city, where he lives as a white man. Following her brother's lead, Rena begins to live as a white woman. The secret of her identity leads to conflict when she falls in love with a white aristocrat who learns the truth of her heredity. The ensuing drama emphasizes themes of interracial relations and depicted the intricacies of racial identity in the American South.

According to Hollis Robbins, the two major influences on The House Behind the Cedars are Chesnutt's life and Walter Scott's novel Ivanhoe. Well read in nineteenth century British literature and being of predominantly European ancestry, Chesnutt was light skinned enough to pass as a white man, although he openly identified with his African-American roots. Additionally, his portrayal of interracial romantic relations in The House Behind the Cedars was controversial. Although the novel was critically well received, its controversy contributed to poor financial performance.

== Plot summary ==
The novel opens "a few years after the Civil War." John Warwick walks around the town of Patesville, North Carolina in which he used to live and visits his childhood home.

John joyfully reunites with his mother Molly, and his sister Rena and tells them what his life has been like since leaving home: he has become a successful lawyer; he was married, but his wife died, leaving him with their baby son Albert. He asks Rena to come live with him and help take care of Albert. The narrator slowly reveals to the reader that John and Rena are mixed-race: their mother is Black and their father, now dead and never married to their mother) was white.

Rena says goodbye to her mother and Frank Fowler, one of their workmen who is a close family friend and deeply in love with Rena. The siblings make their way back to South Carolina. Upon their arrival, they attend a tournament where men dressed as knights participate in a jousting competition. There Rena meets George Tryon, who wins the tournament, invites Rena to the ball, and falls in love with her. Rena agrees to marry George, but is anxious that he will discover her African American heritage.

John and George are called away on legal business, and while they're gone, Rena is haunted by three dreams that her mother is sick and dying. She then receives a letter from her mother revealing that she is indeed very ill, so she immediately boards a train back home. While she is gone, George returns and then is sent off on another errand—to Rena's hometown. After a couple of near-misses, George discovers Rena at home and learns that she has been pretending to be 100% white. Rena faints and George is devastated by the fact that Rena has deceived him about her identity. Unable to allow their relationship to continue, he writes a letter to John, stating that he will not marry Rena, but will keep their family secret.

John tries to convince Rena to move away with him to start a new life, but she does not want to leave their mother again. Molly's friend visits and asks if Rena would be interested in accompanying her widower cousin Jeff Wain to teach at his school for colored children. Rena travels with Jeff and takes her teacher's examination, where the administrator suggests that Jeff is not to be trusted. A visitor enters the schoolhouse one day and tells Rena that she would like to help support the school. She also informs Rena that Jeff is not a widower; he had actually beaten his previous wife so badly that she left him. After hearing this, Rena is afraid to be alone with him.

Walking home from school one day, Rena sees George approaching her from one direction while Jeff is advancing towards her from the other direction. In a panic, she runs into the woods, where she falls unconscious and subsequently becomes very ill. Family friend Frank Fowler finds her and takes her home, where she wastes away. She dies just as George arrives to repledge his love for her.

== Characters ==
- Rowena (Rena) Walden – (named after Walter Scott's Rowena), a young woman who is "strikingly handsome, with a stately beauty seldom encountered… she walked with an elastic step that revealed a light heart and the vigor of perfect health". She is the younger sister of John Warwick and daughter of Molly Walden. Although she is of mixed blood and thus considered to be a colored woman (or mulatto), her skin is light enough that she may pass as a white woman. Rena becomes engaged to George Tryon, but after he discovers her family history, their relationship ends and she moves with Jeff Wain to become a schoolteacher for colored children.
- George Tryon – young man of 23, who is described as "a tall, fair young man, with gray eyes, and a frank, open face". He is a close friend of John Warwick, and falls in love with Rena when he first meets her at the Clarence tournament. His mother wants him to marry Blanche Leary, but he has his heart set on marrying Rena. When he finds out that she is not white, he leaves her, but continues to love her despite her race.
- John Warwick – Rena's 28-year-old brother who moved away from home when he was younger in order to become a successful lawyer in South Carolina. John is a protective brother who wants Rena to have a new life and be afforded all the opportunities she deserves. Like Rena, his skin allows him to pass as a white man, but he must stay away from Patesville to conceal his identity. He was married, but his wife died, leaving him with their young son Albert.
- Molly Walden – John and Rena's mother who is also of mixed race and comes from a family of prosperous, free African Americans. After John leaves home, she is alone with Rena in the house behind the cedars. Her illiteracy plays a hand in causing the story's main conflict, since she is unable to read Judge Straight's letter warning her to keep Rena at home.
- Frank Fowler – a Black workman for the Walden family who grew up with Rena and is in love with her. He is strongly devoted to the Waldens and would do anything for Rena. When Molly Walden is left alone, he helps take care of her and reads/writes letters for her.
- Jeff Wain – a mulatto man who owns the schoolhouse Rena teaches in; the man Molly wants Rena to marry. Although on first impression he is polite and gracious, he becomes a character of suspicion. "Upon a close or hostile inspection there would have been some features of his ostensibly good-natured face—the shifty eye, the full and slightly drooping lower lip—which might have given a student of physiognomy food for reflection", and Rena becomes afraid to be left alone with him. He claims to be a widower, but Mrs. Tryon explains that his wife is not dead, but left him because he had physically abused her.
- Judge Archibald Straight – John Warwick's mentor, who promised John's father that he would help provide for his children. He advised John to move away so that he could pass as white and become a lawyer, and tried to prevent Rena and George from meeting in Patesville.

== Major themes ==
=== Racial relations in post-Civil War South ===
This novel centrally addresses the relationships between whites and African Americans in the post-Civil War South. Those who were freed after the war no longer belong to white families; however, the text demonstrates that some still consider themselves to be in a subordinate position to their white masters. For example, Plato, one of Rena's students who used to belong to Tryon, continues to call George "master" despite the fact that he is now free. His friend reminds him, "'Wat you callin' dat w'ite man marster fur?' whispered a tall yellow boy to the acrobat addressed as Plato. 'You don' b'long ter him no mo'; you're free, an' ain' got no sense ernuff ter know it.'" Similarly, Frank feels obliged to continue to serve the Waldens (Rena in particular) as he always did: "A smile, which Peter would have regarded as condescending to a free man, who since the war, was as good as anybody else; a kind word, which Peter would have considered offensively patronizing... were ample rewards for the thousand and one small services Frank had rendered the two women who lived in the house behind the cedars".

The events that transpire in The House Behind the Cedars emphasize the extent to which race relations are strained in the South despite any progress that has been made since the war. Tryon refuses to even think about colored people, and becomes enraged when the voice of a colored girl interrupts his daydream. Upon discovering that Rena is not of pure white blood he decides that she "was worse than dead to him; for if he had seen her lying in her shroud before him, he could at least have cherished her memory; now, even this consolation was denied him". He claims that he could overlook any other flaw, including illegitimate birth, but race could not be ignored. Even Molly Walden, who is of mixed race, and thus would have no personal issues with African Americans, acknowledges the ridiculousness of choosing to live as a Black person if given the opportunity to be white. When Frank offers to drive across the world for Rena, Molly laughs and thinks, ""Her daughter was going to live in a fine house, and marry a rich man, and ride in her carriage. Of course a negro would drive the carriage, but that was different from riding with one in a cart".

However, there are also white characters in the story who display a more positive attitude toward non-white citizens. Judge Straight has acted as a mentor and friend to John Walden, fully aware of his racial identity. Rather than being repulsed by the idea of a successful mulatto lawyer, he encourages John to move away and pretend to be white. Furthermore, Mrs. Tryon visits Rena's colored schoolhouse (the first white woman to do so), offering to assist with the school and taking interest in the students and the nobility of Rena's educating them.

=== Racial identity ===
Drawing on Ivanhoe's dramatization of racial politics (Jewish, Norman, Saxon) Chesnutt examines passing as white and how outsiders' perspectives of a person who does so are affected. It is evident through the story that the ability to pass as a white person is correlated with success. John is able to take advantage of his fair skin and move to South Carolina and become a prominent white lawyer. Similarly, Rena is able to follow in his footsteps and climb the ranks of white society. Both are well-educated and exceedingly intelligent. Their mulatto mother, on the other hand, is of darker skin and completely illiterate. Though she encourages her children's education, she has not received much of her own.

Chesnutt's story uses characters' passing as white to illustrate traditional expectations of each race. This is particularly highlighted by Mrs. Tryon's appearance in Rena's school where she is surprised by Rena's refined manner which was "not merely of fine nature, but of contact with cultured people; a certain reserve of speech and manner quite inconsistent with Mrs. Tryon's experience of colored women".

== Critical reception ==
Much effort was made for Chesnutt to build this story into a publishable novel. The House Behind the Cedars was originally a short story called "Rena", and only after several revisions and converting the manuscript into a novel was it accepted by Houghton Mifflin in 1900. This novel was controversial in its way of addressing racial tensions, miscegenation, and non-whites passing for white people. Furthermore, Chesnutt was one of the only writers who encouraged the idea that people of mixed race had "a morally and socially defensible argument, if not a natural right, to be accepted as white." Overall, though, he received somewhat mixed reviews. Some critics felt that The House Behind the Cedars was not as well written as his previous short stories, while others considered it to be successful in addressing a prevalent social phenomenon.

A reviewer from The Chicago Daily Tribune argued that although the story was well composed, the novel lacked "freshness and originality". The Detroit Free Press described it as "a story of sustained strength and interest, wrought out to an artistic finale", and "easily the most notable novel of the month". Additionally, the Boston Evening Transcript noted that Chesnutt addressed the race problem in the South with "marked ability" and "may be taken as symbolical of what the author regards as the eventual solution of the race question". Chesnutt received praise from The Nation review, but the critic asserted that "[Chesnutt] probably has but faint hope of upsetting social beliefs".

== Sales ==
The House Behind the Cedars was not a financial success. Although it was popular enough for Houghton Mifflin to publish Chesnutt's future novels, not many copies were sold. Ultimately, none of his novels generated enough revenue for Chesnutt to maintain his lifestyle and to devote his entire career to writing. The mild popularity of his novels did not last long, since only one of Chesnutt's works remained in print at the time that he died.

== Adaptation ==
Chesnutt's novel was loosely adapted into a film under the same name directed by African-American filmmaker Oscar Micheaux in 1927. The silent film starred Shingzie Howard as Rena Walden, Lawrence Chenault as the white aristocrat, and C.D. Griffith as Frank Fowler. In this adaptation, Rena, who still passes for white, is proposed to by a white millionaire who does not know her background. However, she ultimately returns to her lover Frank Fowler, who is gaining higher status in society. Micheaux later remade the film five years later under the title Veiled Aristocrats with significant plot changes to the novel.

== Bibliography ==
- "Book Review of the House Behind the Cedars." Nation 72.1861 (1901): 182. Print.
- "Charles W. Chesnutt." Black Literature Criticism. Ed. Draper, James. Vol. 1. Detroit: Gale Research Inc., 1992. 374-75. Print.
- "An Issue in the Race Problem." Detroit Free Press 11 Nov. 1900: 11. Print.
- "The Literary Canonization of Charles Chesnutt." The Journal of Blacks in Higher Education.37 (2002): 48-49. Print.
- "Race Problem in a Novel." Chicago Daily Tribune (1872–1922) 10 Nov. 1900: 10-10. Print.
- "Review of The House Behind the Cedars." Boston Evening Transcript 31 Oct. 1900. Print.
- Andrews, William L. "Charles W. Chesnutt." Africam American Writers. Ed. Smith, Valerie. 2 ed. Vol. 1. New York Scribner's Sons, 2001. 115-16. Print.
- Chesnutt, Charles W. The House Behind the Cedars. Boston: Houghton Mifflin and Co., 1900. Print.
- Gartner, Carol B. "Charles Chesnutt: Novelist of a Cause." Critical Essays on Charles W. Chesnutt. Ed. Joseph R. McElrath, Jr. . New York G.K. Hall & Co., 1999. Print.
- The House Behind the Cedars. 1924.
- Robbins, Hollis. “The Marrow of Allusion: Charles W. Chesnutt’s House Behind the Cedars and Walter Scott’s Ivanhoe.” Approaches to Teaching the Works of Charles W. Chesnutt, Eds. Bill Hardwig and Susanna Ashton. MLA Books, December 2017.
- Sedlack, Robert P. "The Evolution of Charles Chesnutt's the House Behind the Cedars." CLA Journal 29.2 (1975): 126. Print.
- Wollstein, Hans J. "House Behind the Cedars (1924)." The New York Times. May 12, 2012 <http://movies.nytimes.com/movie/95717/House-Behind-the-Cedars/overview?scp=34&sq=run%20silent&st=cse>.
