= Tess Chakkalakal =

American biographer and writer

Tess Chakkalakal is a professor of Africana Studies and English at Bowdoin College who is known for her work as an American biographer and writer.

== Education and career ==
Chakkalakal has a B.A. from the University of Toronto, and she earned an M.A. and a Ph.D. from York University. As of 2025, she is a professor of Africana Studies and English at Bowdoin College.She previously taught at Williams College, Bowling Green State University, and Texas A & M International University

She is co-host and creator of Dead Writers: A Podcast About Great American Authors and Where They Lived.

== Selected publications ==
- Chakkalakal, Tess (2005). ""Uncle Tom" and the Making of a Modern African American Literature". The Review of Black Political Economy. 33 (2): 73–87. doi:10.1007/s12114-005-1017-7. ISSN 0034-6446.
- Novel Bondage: Slavery, Marriage, and Freedom in Nineteenth-Century America (Illinois, 2011)
- Jim Crow, Literature, and the Legacy of Sutton E. Griggs (Georgia, 2013).
- Imperium in Imperio by Sutton E. Griggs: A Critical Edition (West Virginia Press, 2022).
- A Matter of Complexion: The Life and Fictions of Charles W. Chesnutt (St. Martin’s Press, 2025)
