= The Marrow of Tradition =

1901 novel by Charles W. Chesnutt

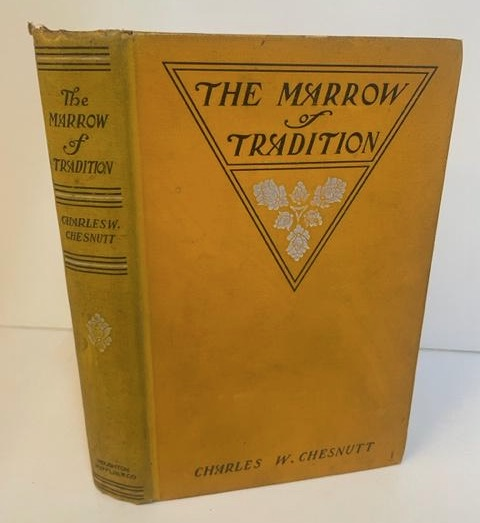
- First edition cover, 1901
- Author: Charles W. Chesnutt
- Language: English
- Genre: Historical novel
- Publisher: Houghton, Mifflin and Company
- Publication date: October 1901
- Publication place: United States
- Media type: Print (hardback & paperback)
- OCLC: 939418
- Preceded by: The House Behind the Cedars

The Marrow of Tradition (1901) is a novel by the African-American author Charles W. Chesnutt, portraying a fictional account of the Wilmington massacre of 1898 in Wilmington, North Carolina.

== Plot introduction ==
This story is a fictional account of the rise of the white supremacist movement, specifically as it contributed to the "race riots" that took place in Wilmington, North Carolina, in 1898. Critics argue over what may be a more appropriate term for the event: some favor "massacre", while a North Carolina state commission ruled that it was a coup d'etat, the only overthrow of a legitimately elected government in United States history. White people attacked and killed Black people in the city and overthrew the county government, establishing white supremacists in power.

Chesnutt anticipated the book would "become lodged in the popular mind as the legitimate successor of Uncle Tom's Cabin... as depicting an era in our national history". The Marrow of Tradition was poorly received in the South and received mixed reviews in the North. It ultimately sold only 3,726 copies in its first year.

== Plot summary ==
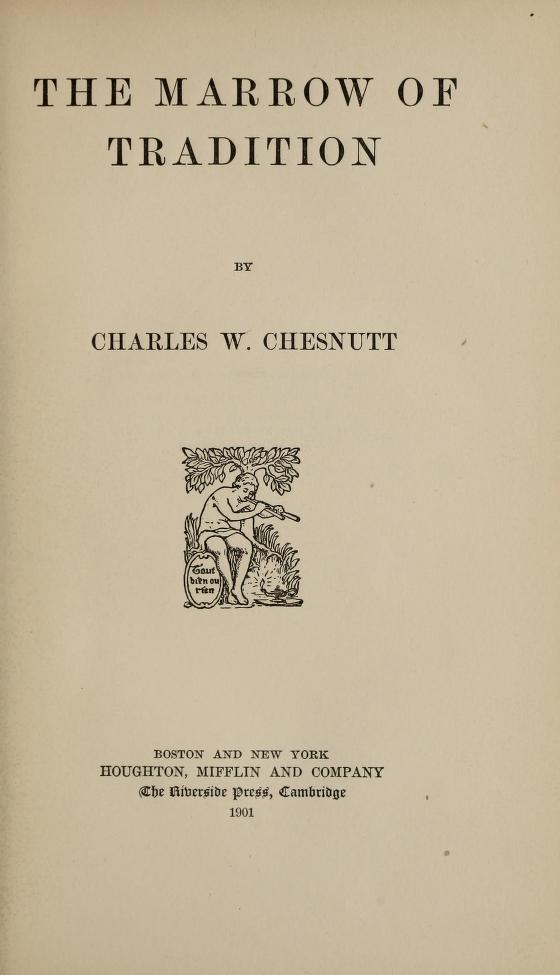
First edition title page, 1901

Set in the fictional town of Wellington, The Marrow of Tradition features several interweaving plots that encompass the poles of the racially segregated society of the American South at the turn of the century. One plot follows Major Carteret, the white owner of the major Wellington newspaper, as he colludes with several other powerful white men to take political control of the town. They are outraged about a provocative editorial published in a black paper that questioned white justifications for lynchings. As the town's unrest intensifies, Carteret faces domestic pressures; his only child Dodie and wife Olivia are both unwell. Carteret's niece Clara, recently introduced to society, is courted by the young Tom Delamere, a handsome and conniving aristocrat who spends most evenings nurturing his penchant for drink and cards. His habits are contrasted with those of Lee Ellis, a rival for Clara, and William Miller, a young black physician who with his wife has returned to his hometown of Wellington to practice medicine. He gained his medical education in Paris and Vienna. Though jarred by segregation and Jim Crow racism, Miller sets up his practice and starts his life. Miller's wife, Janet, is the biracial half-sister of Mrs. Olivia Carteret; Janet spends her entire life hoping to be acknowledged by her white sister, who is too proud to accept her father's miscegenation after her mother died. Josh Green as a boy witnessed the murder of his father at the hands of a white man—a character named Captain McBane—and is intent on exacting revenge.

All these subplots are forced to a crisis through two events: the murder of a white woman, Polly Ochiltree, for which a black servant, Sandy Campbell, is accused, and county elections. Campbell would have been lynched and burned without a trial if it weren't for Miller alerting his boss, the grandfather of the actual murderer, Tom Delamere. Old Mr. Delamere and Lee Ellis discover the truth and save Sandy's life, but Tom is never apprehended for his crime. A few months later, on the eve of the elections Major Carteret, Captain McBane, and one General Belmont conspired to incite a "revolution," overthrowing the Republican party from power and keeping blacks from participating in the elections. They published inflammatory statements in the Morning Chronicle and the revolution quickly became a riot which engulfed the town.

The novel culminates with justice for some—the faithful servant Campbell is saved by his patron, Delamere falls from grace, Josh Green avenges his father's death albeit at the cost of his own life, and Janet Miller gains recognition from her sister, who, along with Major Carteret, was humbled to respect the black Miller family in order to save an ailing Dodie.

== Major themes ==
The novel was written in direct refutation of many sensationalized accounts of the "race riot" in Wilmington. These accounts included inaccurate news reports and a series of white supremacist novels, yet these were the only sources available to readers in the North, whose knowledge was limited to what was readily available in print.

Chesnutt reflected on the novel in 1905, answering a letter from a high school student: "The book was received by the public with respect, but not with any great enthusiasm. By the public I mean the great reading public whose opinion is reflected by the newspapers and magazines which reflect public opinion. It had a fair sale, but was criticized as being bitter. I did not intend it to be so. Nor do I think it was."

== Allusions/references to history and legacy ==
The novel portrays the many classes and races in the postbellum southern United States, and depicts the Wilmington massacre of 1898. Gordon Fraser has suggested that elements of the novel, particularly scenes of black resistance, are modeled on the Robert Charles riots in New Orleans in 1900.

The Marrow of Tradition comments indirectly on contemporary texts like Frances Harper's novel Iola Leroy and Booker T. Washington's famous Atlanta Address of 1895. Its criticism of the non-confrontational approach to race relations is expressed by the character of Dr. William Miller.

A radio dramatization by Cheryl Martin, directed by Pam Fraser Solomon, was broadcast on BBC Radio 4 as a Classic Serial in February 2003.
