= The Conjure Woman =

Short story collection by Charles W. Chesnutt

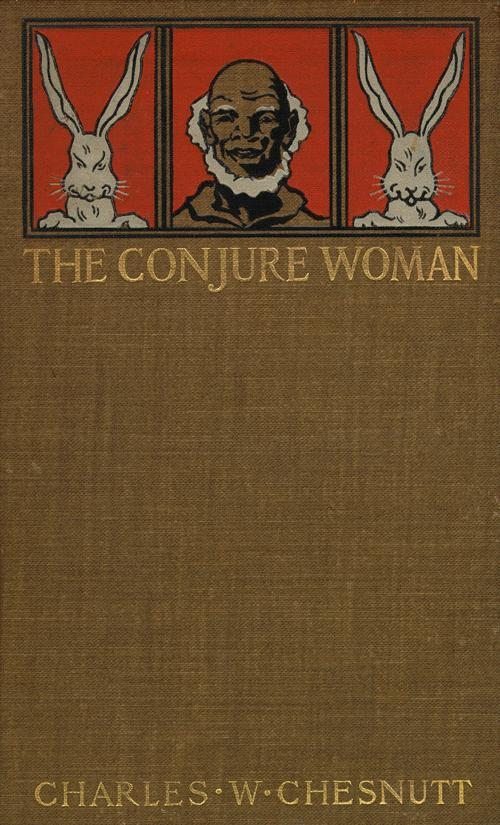
- Author: Charles W. Chesnutt
- Genre: Short story collection
- Publisher: Houghton Mifflin Company
- Publication date: 1899
- Pages: 246

The Conjure Woman is a collection of short stories by African-American fiction writer, essayist, and activist Charles W. Chesnutt. First published in 1899, The Conjure Woman is considered a seminal work of African-American literature composed of seven short stories, set in Patesville, North Carolina. A film adaptation, The Conjure Woman (film) was made by Oscar Micheaux.

== Background ==
Chesnutt wrote the collection's first story, "The Goophered Grapevine", in 1887 and published it in The Atlantic Monthly. Later that year, Chesnutt traveled to Boston and met with Walter Hines Page, an editor at the Houghton Mifflin Company. Page asked Chesnutt to forward some of his writing, which was the beginning of a multiple-year correspondence between the two.

Chesnutt wrote three more of the stories between 1887 and 1889 he called "Conjure Tales", two of which would eventually appear in The Conjure Woman. The stories were "Po' Sandy" published in The Atlantic Monthly in 1888, and "The Conjurer's Revenge" published in Overland Monthly in June 1889. In March of 1898, Page wrote Chesnutt to inform him that Houghton Mifflin would consider publishing a short-story collection with "the same original quality" as "The Goophered Grapevine" and "Po' Sandy". Over the next two months, Chesnutt wrote six additional stories, four of which were selected by Page and other editors at Houghton Mifflin to appear in The Conjure Woman, including "Mars Jeems's Nightmare", "Sis' Becky's Pickaninny", "The Gray Wolf's Ha'nt", and "Hot-Foot Hannibal".

Houghton Mifflin did not note Chesnutt's race when announcing and advertising the publication of The Conjure Woman. Chesnutt said that he preferred to be neither heralded or shunned on the basis of his color, but that his "colored friends ... saw to it that the fact was not overlooked". One friend wrote a "chiding" letter to the editor of the Atlanta Constitution, that published a favorable review of the book, accompanied by a portrait of Chesnutt to prove his race.

In an 1890 letter to his mentor, the Southern novelist George Washington Cable, Chesnutt explained his intent to subvert the popular image of the Negro in literary magazines, saying that "all of the many Negroes . . . whose virtues have been given to the world in the magazine press recently, have been blacks, full-blooded, and their chief virtues have been their dog-like fidelity to their old master, for whom they have been willing to sacrifice almost life itself. Such characters exist. . . . But I can't write about those people, or rather I won't write about them."

== Content ==
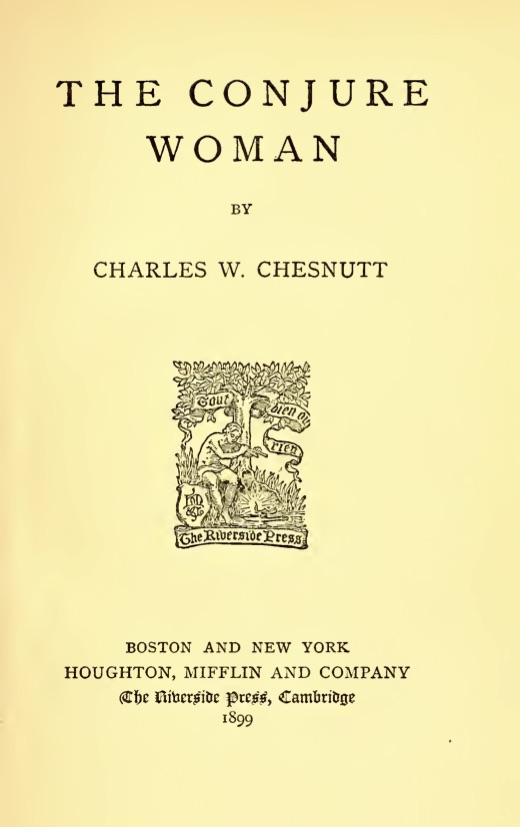
First edition title page for The Conjure Woman (1899)

The stories in The Conjure Woman all share the same frame narrative and dueling voices. The narrator is a white Northerner named John who has come to the South because his white wife, named Annie, is in poor health and requires a warmer climate. Also, John wants to own and operate a vineyard. John passes along the "conjure tales" told to him by "Uncle" Julius McAdoo, an ex-slave who serves as both a trickster figure and an unreliable narrator. John, who prefaces each tale with a supercilious monologue, is captivated by the pre-Civil War history of the region but sceptical of McAdoo's clever and sometimes crafty accounts, while Annie is more sensitive to lived experience and sometimes glimpses the covert moral in McAdoo's stories.

Each story involves other former slaves from the McAdoo plantation or other nearby plantations. Most of the stories are derived from African American folktales and hoodoo conjuring traditions; others are revisions of tales from Ovid's Metamorphoses. Each story features a conjurer, most notably Aun' Peggy in "Po' Sandy," "Mars Jeems's Nightmare," "Sis' Becky's Pickaninny," and "Hot Foot Hannibal." In "The Conjurer's Revenge" and "The Gray Wolf's Ha'nt," Uncle Julius discusses the activities of free black conjure men.

The Conjure Woman differs from other post-Civil War literature in the plantation tradition in condemning the plantation regime and eschewing popular racial stereotypes like the magnanimous white slaveholder and the infantile black in need of a caring master. Critics noted that Chesnutt deploys a clichéd or codified structure, with a friendly former slave recounting a story to white Northerners, and creates a familiar impression of antebellum nostalgia. In African American Folklore as Racial Project in Charles W. Chesnutt's The Conjure Woman, Donald M. Shaffer contends that Chesnutt's use of storytelling is a form of black agency as it gives Chesnutt the opportunity to employ a traditional form of storytelling in order to flip the narrative of plantation fictional stories. The tales told by Julius are more tragic than wistful and underscore a deceptive naivety and mysticism with a subtle, sly challenge to white authority. Julius contradicts the dominant racial discourse of the late-nineteenth and twentieth centuries, depicting black resistance and survival as well as demonstrating the psychological effects of oppression and slavery. Despite their enslavement, Uncle Julius and other slaves leveraged power in exchange for information, favors, or conjuring, and demonstrate their intelligence through plots of self-gain and sometimes revenge.

In The Art of the Conjure Woman, critic and scholar Richard E. Baldwin argued that Chesnutt is "the ultimate conjure man, hoping that by 'wukking de roots' of black culture he might be able to work a powerful goopher on white America and lead it to accept the equality of the black."

== Short stories ==
=== The Goophered Grapevine ===
This is the first short story from The Conjure Woman, published in The Atlantic in August 1887, told to the narrator by Julius McAdoo, a former enslaved man who lives on the plantation that the narrator, John, and his wife, Annie, visit one day. Set in Patesville, North Carolina, John and Annie moved there for an improvement in his wife's health and to seek other business opportunities. Knowing that the couple wanted to purchase the property, McAdoo advises them not to do so, informing them that when Dugal McAdoo, the previous master, purchased the property, it was very rich in wine production because of its vineyards. To protect his grapes from being stolen, Master McAdoo consulted with a conjure woman, Aunt Peggy, who placed a curse on the vineyard and warned the slaves that whoever stole them, would die within a year. Henry, a new slave, did not know of the curse, and when he ate the grapes, he was cursed to age when the leaves of the vines withered and once the vines died, so did Henry. Master McAdoo then sold Henry to other plantation owners in the Spring when he was young and bought him back in the Winter at less price. He did that many times and made a fortune. Suffering the loss of his slaves and his vineyard, Master McAdoo left the vineyard abandoned after the war to the current state in which the couple found it. McAdoo warns the couple against purchasing the property due to it still being cursed, but the narrator buys the vineyard regardless.

=== Po' Sandy ===
This second short story was published in The Atlantic in 1888 and it follows the same frame narrative as the previous one with Julius McAdoo advising John against following through with his plans of demolishing a schoolhouse to build a kitchen. In this short story, Sandy is an enslaved man owned by Mars Marrabo McSwayne, who sends Sandy to travel to help friends and families. During one of Sandy's trips, McSwayne sells Sandy's wife and replaces her with another woman, Tenie. Over time, Sandy and Tenie develop a relationship, and Tenie reveals to Sandy that she was a conjure woman for some time in her life. The couple decide that they will turn Sandy into a tree so that he no longer has to travel and turn him back into a person from time to time. However, as McAdoo relates, one day McSwayne decides to have the tree cut down to build floorboards in his kitchen, ending the life of Sandy. Afterwards, other enslaved people claimed that they heard groans and moans coming from the floor, resulting in the belief that the building was haunted. This led to the kitchen being demolished, the lumber was used to build the schoolhouse that John wishes to dismantle to build a kitchen in its place. After hearing the story from McAdoo, Annie dissuades John from dismantling the schoolhouse to build the kitchen.

=== Mars Jeems's Nightmare ===
In this third short story of The Conjure Woman, it opens up with John informing McAdoo that he can no longer let his grandson work in the plantation because he is not a good worker. With this, McAdoo shares the story of Mars Jeems, a slaveowner, who would have nightmares of being turned into a slave. Because Mars Jeems mistreats his enslaved people, his fiancé refuses to marry him, which results in him further taking his anger out on the enslaved people. One of these enslaved men, Solomon, asks Aunt Peggy, a conjure woman, for help, at which point she hexes Mars Jeems's soup. Disappearing and reappearing as a Black man, he is beaten and made compliant. A month later, Solomon feeds the man a hexed sweet potato, upon which then the man disappears and once again returns as Mars Jeems. With this new experience, Mars Jeems begins to treat his enslaved people better and his fiancé agrees to marry him once again. As the moral of the story goes, McAdoo warns John and Annie that those who do wrong by others suffer from nightmares and those who do good receive good prospects. Having taken this moral well, Annie encourages John to let McAdoo's grandson continue to work at the plantation.

=== The Conjurer's Revenge ===
In this short story, McAdoo once again tries to dissuade John from doing something that benefits him only, which is to purchase a mule. McAdoo shares the story of an enslaved man named Primus, who was turned into a mule after he was thought to have stolen a pig. The conjurer is overcome with guilt for making the mistake of placing the conjure, so he promises to reverse the spell, but as the mule is sold to his original owner, it gets drunk and attacks Primus's girlfriend. However, the conjure man dies as he is attempting to reverse the spell, and Primus is instead left with a club foot, which he had prior to the conjure. As the story goes, McAdoo advises John against buying the mule and instead encourages him to purchase a horse, which turns out to be sick and unreliable, thus dying. At this point, John is left to question McAdoo's trustworthiness and his intentions with John.

=== Sis' Becky's Pickaninny ===
This short story of The Conjure Woman now follows John as he reproaches McAdoo for all of his superstitious beliefs and how they lack foundation, commenting that these traditions are the reason why Southern Black people are destined for a life of continued acquiescence and little prosperity. This opinion stemmed from McAdoo's assertion that carrying a rabbit foot leads to good luck. John is concerned for Annie's health, since the main reason they moved to the countryside was to improve her health due to her current bouts of depression and anxiety. With this knowledge, McAdoo then relates the story of a young boy who was separated from his mother and orphaned due to a series of events, which could have all been avoided if the mother had simply carried a rabbit's foot. As the story goes, according to McAdoo, Sis' Becky's husband dies, upon which her master trades her in for a horse. Thus leaving her child, named Mose, orphaned and who grows sick, Aunt Peggy goes on to turn him into a mockingbird from time to time so that he can visit his mother. As part of her plan, Aunt Peggy lames the horse for which Sis Becky was traded, ultimately influencing Becky's master to trade her back, and reuniting her with her son once more. McAdoo claims that none of these events would have happened if Sis Becky would have had a rabbit foot with her, a moral that Annie once again understands. Over time, John notices that Annie grows to feel better, which he attributes to her simply surpassing her melancholy. One day, Annie asks John to grab her handkerchief from her blue dress, and as he goes to grab the handkerchief, John discovers a rabbit foot that McAdoo had placed in her room, which can be related to Annie's quick recovery.

=== The Grey Wolf's Ha'nt ===
In another one of McAdoo's tales, this time, he aims to convince John to not cultivate land where McAdoo has found bees since he uses it as his side business. As such, he relates the story of a conjure man named Uncle Jube, who seeks revenge on an enslaved man named Dan for murdering his son for trying to steal his wife. With this knowledge, Dan goes to see the conjure woman for help in protecting him, but Uncle Jube has already caught up to him. Uncle Jube manages to fool Dan into believing that he does not know that Dan is responsible for the murder of his son and instead agrees to help him find the witch that has caused this misfortune. Prior to meeting with Dan, Uncle Jube kidnaps Dan's wife and turns her into a black cat and later turns Dan into a wolf. Informing him that the black cat is indeed the witch, Dan tears out the black cat's throat and realizes that it was his wife all along. Upon this realization, Dan goes to find Uncle Jube and tears his throat out. As he bleeds to death, Uncle Jube reveals his intentions by letting Dan know that now they are even and to drink the potion that will turn him back into his human form. However, he did not realize that drinking the potion would keep him as a wolf forever, solidifying Uncle Jube's revenge. Ending the tale with Dan haunting his wife's grave forever, McAdoo argues that John must stay away from that piece of land.

=== Hot-Foot Hannibal ===
In this final short story of The Conjure Woman, Annie' sister, Mabel, faces relationship issues with her boyfriend. Seeing the opportunity, McAdoo tells the story of a young woman by the name of Chloe whose master arranges a marriage with a man named Hannibal. However, because Chloe is in love with another man named Jeff, this poses problems for Hannibal, who grows increasingly frustrated. Searching for a solution, Chloe and Jeff go to Aunt Peggy, who gives them a conjure doll that is meant to intervene with Hannibal's performance to the extent that his master sends him to work the fields again. Taking Hannibal's place, Jeff and Chloe become more wrapped up in their relationship and ultimately forget to return the doll so that Aunt Peggy can take back the curse. Due to this sequence of events, Hannibal continues to worsen in his worth ethic, which results in his master deciding to sell him, which angers Hannibal even more. As a means for revenge, Hannibal lies to Chloe by saying that Jeff is cheating on her. Reacting to this news, Chloe confesses to her master about the conjure doll, which results in Jeff being sold in the place of Hannibal. After Hannibal confesses his trickery to Chloe, the master tries to get Jeff back but it is too late as Jeff has drowned. Filled with his anguish and misery, Chloe lives the rest of her life in mourning until her death. Hearing this story and understanding the moral, Mabel decides to make up with her boyfriend.

== Reception ==
The Conjure Woman received mostly positive reviews and Houghton Mifflin released two more books by Chesnutt the following year.

The book was adapted by Oscar Micheaux as a silent film released as The Conjure Woman in 1926.
