= Charles W. Chesnutt =

African-American writer, activist, and lawyer (1858–1932)

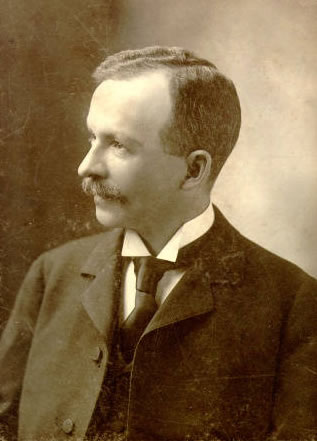
- Chesnutt at age 40
- Born: June 20, 1858; Cleveland, Ohio, U.S.
- Died: November 15, 1932 (aged 74); Cleveland, Ohio, U.S.
- Resting place: Lake View Cemetery
- Occupations: Writer, political activist, lawyer
- Spouse: Susan Perry
- Children: 4

Signature
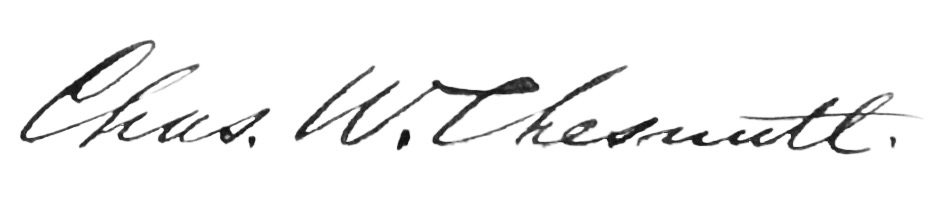

Charles Waddell Chesnutt (June 20, 1858 – November 15, 1932) was an African-American author, essayist, political activist, and lawyer, best known for his novels and short stories exploring complex issues of racial and social identity in the post-Civil War South. Two of his books were adapted as silent films in 1926 and 1927 by the African-American director and producer Oscar Micheaux. Following the Civil Rights Movement during the 20th century, interest in the works of Chesnutt was revived. Several of his books were published in new editions, and he received formal recognition. A commemorative stamp was printed in 2008.

During the early 20th century in Cleveland, Ohio, Chesnutt established what became a highly successful court reporting business, which provided his main income. He became active in the National Association for the Advancement of Colored People, writing articles supporting education as well as legal challenges to discriminatory laws.

== Early life ==
Chesnutt was born in Cleveland, Ohio to Andrew Jackson Chesnutt and Ann Maria (née Sampson) Chesnutt, both "free persons of color" from Fayetteville, North Carolina. His paternal grandfather was known to be a white slaveholder. He considered himself to be an African-American, acknowledging that he was additionally "seven-eighths" White. Given his appearance and background, Chesnutt could "pass" as a white man, and could have been legally permitted to claim said status, but never chose to do so. By the 1920s, the one drop rule was formally codified into law in many Southern states, (Note: The one-drop rule was part of Virginia's Racial Integrity Act in 1924.) officially classifying him as a "Negro" on account of his known ancestry.

After the end of the Civil War and resulting emancipation, in 1867, the Chesnutt family returned to Fayetteville; Charles was nine years old. His parents ran a grocery store, in which Chesnutt worked part-time, but it failed because of his father's poor business practices and the struggling economy of the postwar South. In his early adolescence, Chesnutt was left to take care of his mother and siblings at home, due to his mother's failing health and eventual death. During this time, he published his first story in a small newspaper.

In addition to his responsibilities at home, Chesnutt attended school in Fayetteville called the Howard School, and by the age of 14, he had become a pupil-teacher there due to financial needs. This school was one of many founded for black students by the Freedmen's Bureau during the Reconstruction era. As a teacher, Chesnutt was extended many new job offers, but difficulties of the time period, such as funding and methodological disagreements, caused many of them to be withdrawn.

Throughout the remainder of his youth, Chesnutt continued to study and teach. According to Fayetteville historian Bruce Daws, Chesnutt was also a teacher in Charlotte, North Carolina, from 1873 to 1876, and also taught in schools near Spartanburg, South Carolina. In 1877, he was promoted to assistant principal of the normal school in Fayetteville, one of a number of historically black colleges established for the training of black teachers. By 1880, he became the school's principal and Chief Executive Officer upon the death of the former principal, Robert Harris. After becoming principal, Chesnutt inspired many remarkable qualities in his students. He later resigned from his position in 1883, when he moved to New York City to pursue a writing career.

== Marriage and family ==
In 1878, a year after he was employed at the normal school, Chesnutt married fellow teacher Susan Perry, a young African American from a respected family. Five years later, they moved to New York City, hoping to escape the prejudice and poverty of the Southern United States. By 1898, they had three daughters, named Helen, Ethel, and Dorothy, and one son named Edwin. Their second daughter, Helen Maria Chesnutt, became a noted classicist and published a biography of her father, in which she attempted to avoid extraneous emotion, seeking to provide a detailed telling of her father's life as accurately as she could.

== Legal and writing career ==
Chesnutt wanted to pursue a literary career, which he desired for the sake of providing for his family, as well as improving race relations with social commentary and literary activism. After spending six months in New York City, Chesnutt came to the conclusion that he could not raise a family there, and so the Chesnutts moved to Cleveland. In 1887, in Cleveland, Chesnutt studied the law and passed the bar exam. Chesnutt had learned stenography as a young man in North Carolina, and used this skill to establish what became a lucrative court reporting (legal stenography) business, which made him "financially prosperous".

Chesnutt's library at his Cleveland home

Chesnutt also began writing stories, which were published by top-ranked national magazines. These included The Atlantic Monthly, which in August 1887 published The Goophered Grapevine, his first short story. It was the first work by an African American to be published by The Atlantic. In 1890, he tried to interest Walter Hines Page of Houghton Mifflin in his novel A Business Career, completed that year. Page said he needed to establish his reputation more before publishing a novel but encouraged him. Dealing with white characters and their society, this novel was found among Chesnutt's manuscripts and eventually published in 2005.

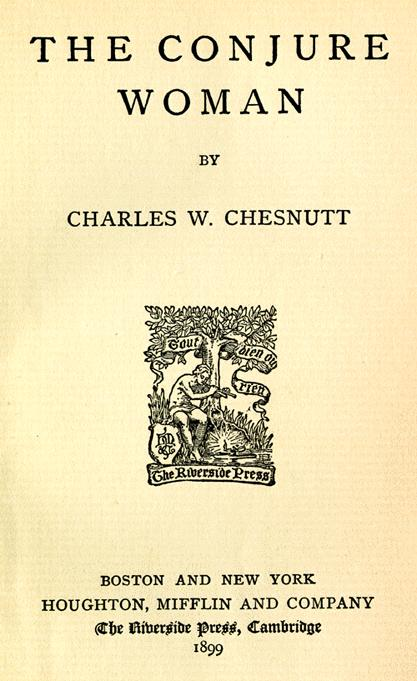
Title page for The Conjure Woman (1899)

His first book was a collection of short stories entitled The Conjure Woman, published in 1899. These stories featured black characters who spoke in African American Vernacular English, as was popular in much contemporary southern literature portraying the antebellum years in the South, as well as the postwar period.

That year he published another short story collection, The Wife of His Youth and Other Stories of the Color-Line (1899), which included the title story, as well as "The Passing of Grandison", and others. These overturned contemporary ideas about the behavior of enslaved people and their seeking of freedom, as well as raising new issues about African-American culture. Atlantic editors strongly encouraged Chesnutt in his writing, and he had a 20-year relationship with the magazine.

Chesnutt's stories on racial identity were complex and concerned characters dealing with the difficulties of racialization, "passing", illegitimacy, racial identities, and social place throughout his career. As in "The Wife of His Youth", Chesnutt explored issues of color and class preference within the black community, including among longtime free people of color in northern towns.

The issues were especially pressing during the social volatility of Reconstruction and late 19th-century southern society. Whites in the South were trying to reestablish supremacy in social, economic and political spheres. With their regaining of political dominance through paramilitary violence and suppression of black voting in the late 19th century, white Democrats in the South passed laws imposing legal racial segregation and a variety of Jim Crow rules that imposed second-class status on black people. From 1890 to 1910, southern states also passed new constitutions and laws that disfranchised most black people and many poor white people from voting. At the same time, there was often distance and competition between the masses of illiterate freedmen making their way from slavery, and families established as free before the war, especially if the latter were educated and property-owning.

Chesnutt continued writing short stories. He also completed a biography of the abolitionist Frederick Douglass, who had escaped from slavery before the war and become renowned as a speaker and abolitionist in the North. Encouraged by Atlantic editors, however, Chestnutt eventually moved to the larger novel form. He wanted to express his stronger sense of activism. The magazine's press published his first novel, The House Behind the Cedars (1900).

His Marrow of Tradition (1901) was based on the Wilmington massacre of 1898, when whites took over the city: attacking and killing many black people, and ousting the elected biracial government. This was the only coup d'état in United States history. Eric Sundquist, in his book To Wake the Nations: Race in the Making of American Culture (1993), described the novel as "probably the most astute political-historical novel of its day", both in recounting the massacre and reflecting the complicated social times in which Chesnutt wrote it. Chesnutt wrote several other novels, though some of them were published posthumously. He also traveled around and gave regular lectures in different states, primarily going on tour in the north.

Because his novels posed a more direct challenge to current sociopolitical conditions, they were not as popular among readers as his stories, which had portrayed antebellum society. But, among the era's literary writers, Chesnutt was well-respected. For example, in 1905, he was invited to Mark Twain's 70th-birthday party in New York City. Although Chesnutt's stories met with critical acclaim, poor sales of his novels doomed his hopes of a self-supporting literary career. His last novel, The Colonel's Dream, was published in 1905 and detailed the actions of an ex-Confederate colonel returning to his hometown in North Carolina with hopes of reviving the town.

He produced a play called Mrs. Darcy's Daughter in 1906, however, it did not make much money and was deemed a failure. After that, Chesnutt returned his focus to his legal career, though he did continue to write fiction. However, he never found the same level of publishing success that he had earlier in his career.

== Writing ==
In style and subject matter, the writings of Charles Chesnutt straddle the divide between the local color school of American writing and literary realism.

One of Chesnutt's important works was The Conjure Woman (1899), a collection of stories set in postbellum North Carolina. The lead character Uncle Julius, a formerly enslaved man, entertains a white couple from the North, who have moved to the farm, with fantastical tales of antebellum plantation life. Julius's tales feature such supernatural elements as haunting, transfiguration, and conjuring, which were typical of Southern African-American folk tales. But Uncle Julius is also telling the stories in ways crafted to achieve his own goals and care for his circle. Julius' tales are similar to Joel Chandler Harris' collection of folktales, the Uncle Remus tales, but differ in that they indirectly provide commentary on slavery and racial inequality, and the psychological and social effects therein. Controversially, some argue that these stories reinforce African American stereotypes, but for the most part, critics typically agree that the stories are elevated by their allegorical depiction of racial injustice. Seven of the Uncle Julius tales were collected in The Conjure Woman. Chesnutt wrote a total of fourteen Uncle Julius tales, the remainder of which were later collected in The Conjure Woman and Other Conjure Tales, edited by Richard H. Brodhead and published posthumously in 1993.

In 1899, Chesnutt published his The Wife of His Youth and Other Stories of the Color-Line, a collection of short stories in the realist vein. He explored many themes that also were used by 20th-century black writers:

especially the prevalence of color prejudice" among blacks, "the dangers of 'passing', the bitterness of mulatto offspring..., the pitfalls of urban life and intermarriage in the North, and the maladministration of justice in the small towns of the South.

Both collections were highly praised by the influential novelist, critic, and editor William Dean Howells in a review published in 1900 in the Atlantic Monthly titled "Mr. Charles W. Chesnutt's Stories". While acknowledging Chesnutt as a black writer, he says the stories are not to be first considered for their "racial interest" but it is as "works of art, that they make their appeal, and we must allow the force of this quite independently of the other interest." He described Chesnutt as notable for the passionless handling of a phase of our common life which is tense with potential tragedy; for the attitude almost ironical, in which the artist observes the play of contesting emotions in the drama under his eyes; and for his apparently reluctant, apparently helpless consent to let the spectator know his real feeling in the matter.

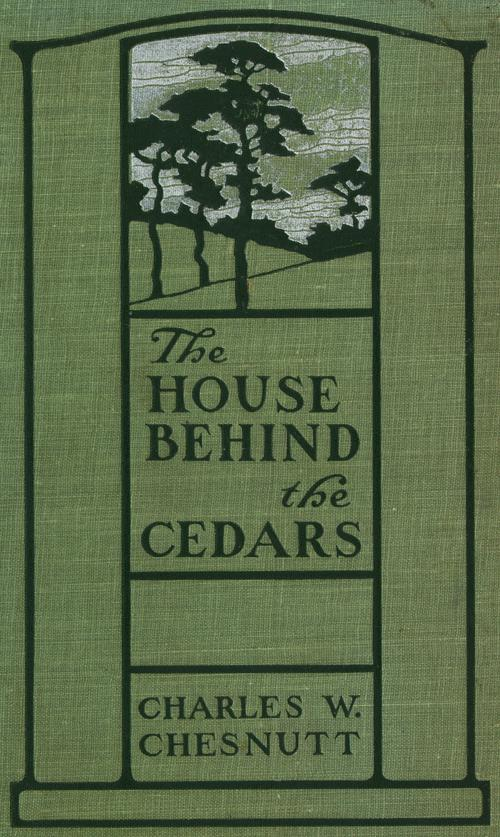
First edition cover of The House Behind the Cedars (1900)

The House Behind the Cedars (1900) was Chesnutt's first novel, his attempt to improve on what he believed were inadequate depictions of the complexity of race and the South's social relations. He wanted to express a more realistic portrait of his region and community drawn from personal experience. He was also concerned with the silence around issues of miscegenation and passing, and hoped to provoke political discussion by his novel. The issues are expressed chiefly through the trials of Rena Walden, a young, fair, mixed-race woman who joins her brother in another town, where he is already passing for white and established as a lawyer. She and a white upper-class friend of his fall in love and become engaged. When her fiancée learns of her black ancestry, he breaks their engagement, but tries to get her to agree to be his mistress. She leaves to teach in a black school, but is assaulted there by a lower-class mulatto. She tries to return to her mother but dies on the way, although helped by a longtime black friend.

The Marrow of Tradition (1901), set fictionally against events like the Wilmington massacre, marked a turning point for Chesnutt. He combined leading characters who were prominent whites in town, together with a black doctor who had returned from the North, exploring the difficulties for the latter in a small, prejudiced Southern town. Among the characters were half-sisters, one white and one black, daughters of the same white father, who encounter each other during these events. With this and other early 20th-century works, Chesnutt began to address political issues more directly and confronted sensitive topics such as "passing", lynching, and miscegenation, which made many readers uncomfortable.

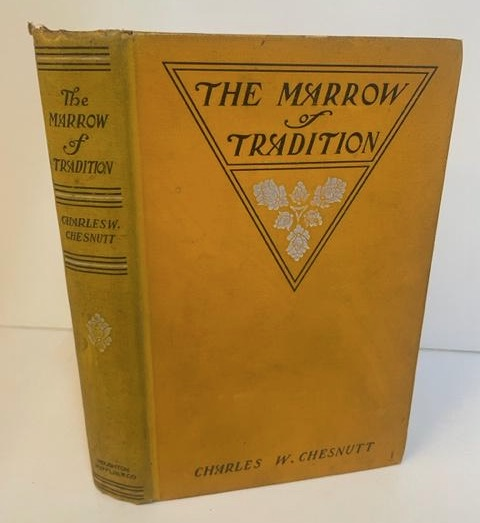
First edition cover of The Marrow of Tradition (1901)

Many reviewers condemned the novel's overt politics. Some of Chesnutt's supporters, such as William Dean Howells, regretted its "bitter, bitter" tone. He found it powerful but with more "justice than mercy" in it. Middle-class white readers, who had been the core audience for Chesnutt's earlier works, found the novel's content shocking and some found it offensive. It sold poorly.

His last novel, The Colonel's Dream (1905), was described as "a tragic story of an idealist's attempt to revive a depressed North Carolina town through a socioeconomic program much akin to the New South creed of Henry W. Grady and Booker T. Washington." It featured a white aristocrat who returns to his town during the Reconstruction, when it was controlled by a lower-class white and was stagnating economically. Colonel Champion builds a new cotton mill, to try to establish business. He runs into conflicts because of racial discrimination and leaves the town in defeat. The book received little critical notice and sold hardly any copies. Chesnutt gave up thinking he could support his family by his writing. He built up his court reporting business, lectured in the North, and became an activist with the NAACP. The Harlem Renaissance eclipsed much of Chesnutt's remaining literary reputation. New writers regarded him as old-fashioned, even believing him to be guilty of pandering to racial stereotypes. They relegated Chesnutt to minor status. Still, the resurgent popularity of African American literature inspired Chesnutt, and he continued writing and attempting to publish novels as late as 1930 when he submitted The Quarry to Houghton Mifflin Company. However, he failed to find the same publishing success. Chesnutt's final published work was the short story "Concerning Father," published in The Crisis in 1930.

Overall, Chesnutt's writing style is formal and subtle. A typical sentence from his fiction is a passage from The House Behind the Cedars: "When the first great shock of his discovery wore off, the fact of Rena's origin lost to Tryon some of its initial repugnance—indeed, the repugnance was not to the woman at all, as their past relations were evidence, but merely to the thought of her as a wife." – Chapter XX, "Digging up roots".

Starting in the 1960s, when the Civil Rights Movement brought renewed attention to African-American life and artists, a long process of critical discussion and re-evaluation has revived Chesnutt's reputation. In particular, critics have focused on the writer's complex narrative technique, subtlety, and use of irony. Several commentators have praised Chesnutt's exploration of racial identity, the manner in which he used African-American speech and folklore, and his criticism of the skewed logic put forth by Jim Crow laws. Chesnutt's longer works laid the foundation for the modern African-American novel.

== Selected written works ==
- The Conjure Woman (1899): Collection of seven short stories which explore themes of personal identity, both racial and social, in the aftermath of the Civil War.
- The Wife of His Youth and Other Stories of the Color-Line (1899): Collection of nine short stories which take place in North Carolina and Ohio, focusing on Jim Crow laws and the racial prejudice between white people and black people that characterized the time period.
  - "The Wife of His Youth": Chesnutt's most anthologized work; short story focusing on a young man from the Midwest, which serves as an analysis of race relations within the black community.
  - "The Passing of Grandison": Short story which takes place during the abolitionist movement, focusing on and addressing the issue of "passing."
- Frederick Douglass (1899): Biography of famous abolitionist, Frederick Douglass.
- The House Behind the Cedars (1900): Novel which takes place in the Carolinas in the aftermath of the Civil War, and focuses on racial relations and identity in the post-war South.
- The Marrow of Tradition (1901): Novel which depicts a fictitious rendition of the Wilmington massacre of 1898, which refutes sensationalized versions of the event.
- The Colonel's Dream (1905): Novel which takes place in the post-Civil War South, portraying the racial violence and oppression characteristic of the time period.

=== Published posthumously ===
- A Business Career - (Written in the 1890s; published 2005, University Press of Mississippi) Novel about an aspiring businesswoman from the late 19th century, which comments on the emergence of new women in American society.
- Mandy Oxendine - (Written in the 1890s; published in 1997) Novel which challenges the idea that a person's identity defines their role in society.
- Paul Marchand, F.M.C. - (Written in 1921; published 1998, University Press of Mississippi) Novel that focuses on mixed marriage and the stigma against it.
- Evelyn's Husband - (2005, University Press of Mississippi) Novel that depicts a high-society love triangle in the early 19th century, focuses on themes of love.
- The Quarry - (Written 1928; published 1999, Princeton University Press) Novel focusing on Harlem's culture during the 20's.

=== Collection ===
- Stories, Novels and Essays: The Conjure Woman, The Wife of His Youth & Other Stories of the Color Line, The House Behind the Cedars, The Marrow of Tradition, Uncollected Stories, Selected Essays (Werner Sollors, ed., Library of America, 2002) ISBN 978-1-931082-06-8.

== Adapted in film ==
In 1926, The Conjure Woman was adapted by Oscar Micheaux into a film of the same name.

In 1927, The House Behind the Cedars was adapted by Oscar Micheaux into a film of the same name.

In 2008, Dante James, a student at Duke University, made a film adaptation of The Doll, one of Chesnutt's short stories. This story was first published in The Crisis in 1912. It was for a course entitled "Adapting Literature, Producing Film". The film premiered at the San Diego Black Film Festival on January 31, 2008, where Clayton LeBouef won an award for "Best Actor". It also won "Best Short Film" at The Sweet Auburn International Film Festival, and the "Short Film" award at the Hollywood Black Film Festival.

== Race relations ==
Chesnutt's views on race relations put him between Du Bois' talented tenth and Booker Washington's separate but equal positions. In 1905, he delivered a speech to the Boston Historical and Literary Association, and later published his speech as an essay titled "Race Prejudice; Its Causes and Its Cure." In the speech, he spoke about dismantling race antagonism "stone by stone" as the black middle class continued to grow and prosper. As he recounted the history of black achievements and spoke on poverty, Chesnutt cited many specific numbers and statistics in his speech, and called for full African American rights.

Chesnutt envisioned a nation of "one people molded by the same culture." He concluded his remarks with the following statement, made 58 years before Dr. Martin Luther King Jr. delivered his "I Have a Dream" speech:

Looking down the vista of time I see an epoch in our nation's history, not in my time or yours, but in the not distant future, when there shall be in the United States but one people, molded by the same culture, swayed by the same patriotic ideals, holding their citizenship in such high esteem that for another to share it is of itself to entitle him to fraternal regard; when men will be esteemed and honored for their character and talents. When hand in hand and heart with heart all the people of this nation will join to preserve to all and to each of them for all future time that ideal of human liberty which the fathers of the republic set out in the Declaration of Independence, which declared that 'all men are created equal', the ideal for which [William Lloyd] Garrison and [Wendell] Phillips and [Sen. Charles] Sumner lived and worked; the ideal for which [Abraham] Lincoln died, the ideal embodied in the words of the Book [Bible] which the slave mother learned by stealth to read, with slow-moving finger and faltering speech, and which I fear that some of us have forgotten to read at all-the Book which declares that "God is no respecter of persons, and that of one blood hath he made all the nations of the earth."

— "Race Prejudice; Its Causes and Its Cure" (1905)

== Social and political activism ==
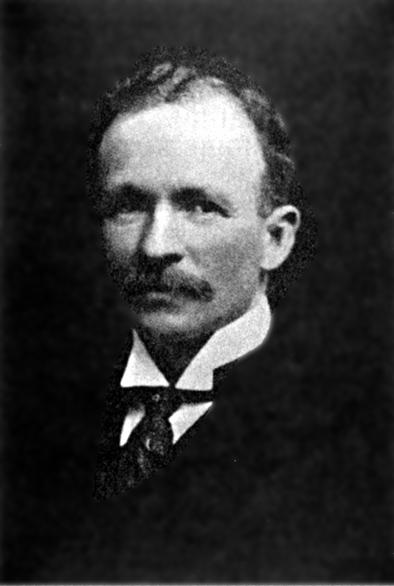
Charles Chesnutt in 1903

Starting in 1901, Chesnutt turned more energies to his court reporting business and, increasingly, to social and political activism. Beginning in 1910, he served on the General Committee of the newly founded National Association for the Advancement of Colored People (NAACP). Working with W.E.B. Du Bois and Booker T. Washington, he became one of the early 20th century's most prominent activists and commentators.

Chesnutt contributed some short stories and essays to the NAACP's official magazine, The Crisis, founded in 1910. He did not receive compensation for these pieces. He wrote a strong essay protesting the southern states' successful actions to disfranchise black people at the turn of the 20th century. To his dismay, their new constitutions and laws survived several appeals to the United States Supreme Court, which held that the conditions imposed (by new electoral registration requirements, poll taxes, literacy tests and similar conditions) applied to all residents and were therefore constitutional. Although a couple of rulings went against the states, they devised new means to keep black people from voting.

In 1917, Chesnutt protested showings in Ohio of the controversial film The Birth of a Nation, which the NAACP officially protested at venues across the nation. In Ohio he gained prohibitions against the film. Set during Reconstruction, the film glorified the Ku Klux Klan, which had taken violent action against freedmen. The Klan was revived following this film, reaching a peak in membership nationally in 1925, as chapters were founded in the urban Midwest and West as well as the South.

Chesnutt died on November 15, 1932, at the age of 74. He was interred in Cleveland's Lake View Cemetery.

== Legacy and honors ==
- In 1913, Chesnutt was awarded an honorary LLD from Wilberforce University.
- 1928, Chesnutt was awarded the NAACP's Spingarn Medal for his life's work.
- In 1987, construction of the Charles Waddell Chesnutt Library was completed at the Fayetteville State University in North Carolina. (Chesnutt had been the second principal of the Howard School, later known as Fayetteville State University.)
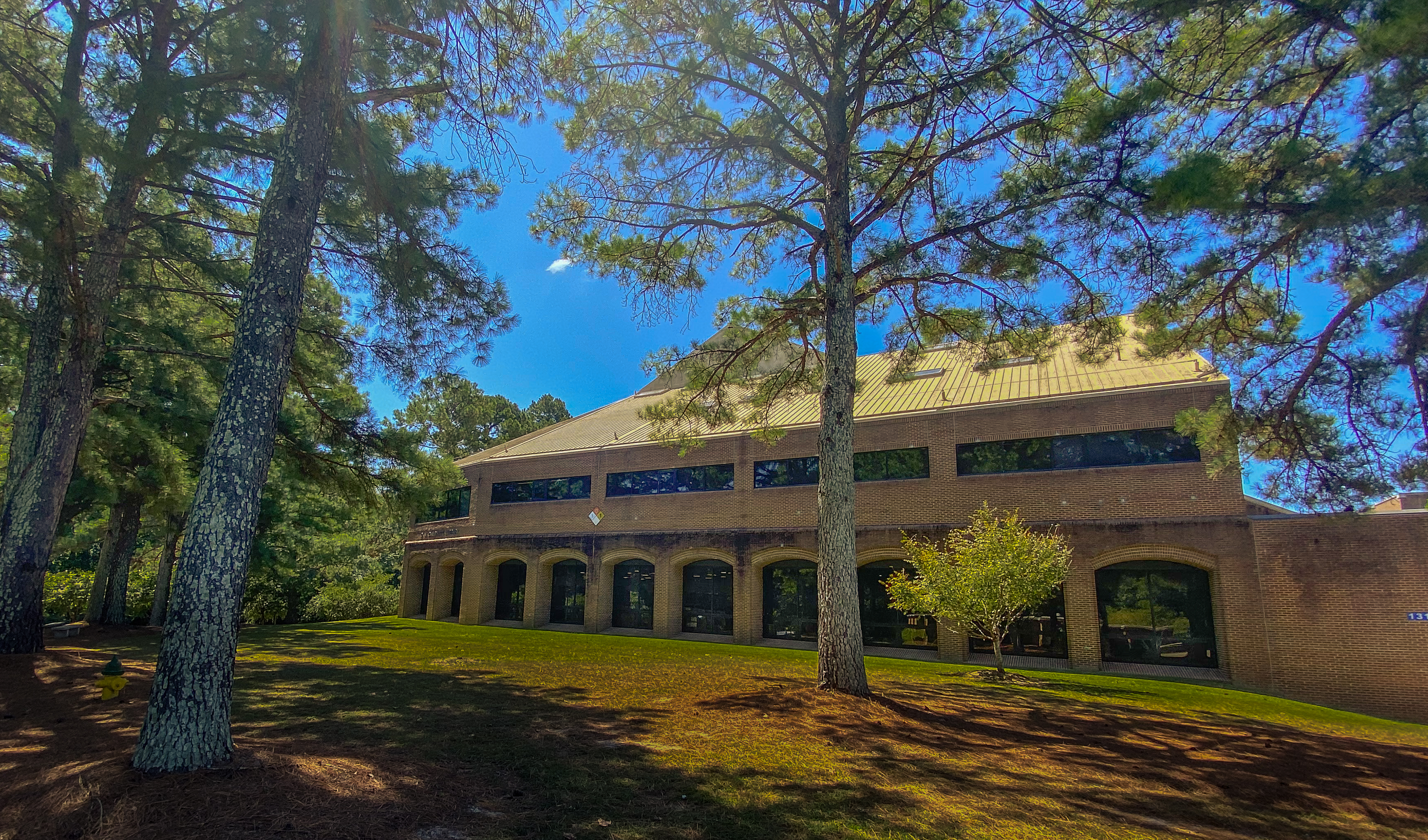
  Charles W. Chesnutt Library on the campus of Fayetteville State University, NC
- In 2002, the Library of America added a major collection of Chesnutt's fiction and non-fiction to its important "American Authors" series, under the title Stories, Novels and Essays: The Conjure Woman, The Wife of His Youth & Other Stories of the Color Line, The House Behind the Cedars, The Marrow of Tradition, Uncollected Stories, Selected Essays (Werner Sollors, ed.). His two major novels and some collected short stories are available online at the University of North Carolina, Wikisource. and other websites (see below).
- On 31 January 2008, the United States Postal Service honored Chesnutt with the 31st stamp in the Black Heritage Series.
- Several of Chesnutt's works have been published posthumously, including essays. In 1989 William L. Andrews wrote of him:

Today Chesnutt is recognized as a major innovator in the tradition of Afro-American fiction, an important contributor to the deromanticizing trend in post-Civil War southern literature and a singular voice among turn-of-the-century realists who treated the color line in American life.

== See also ==
- African American literature
- The Conjure Woman (film version by Oscar Micheaux)
- The House Behind the Cedars (film version by Oscar Micheaux)
