= How Newtown Prepared =

1916 American musical comedy by the Tutt Brothers

How Newtown Prepared is an American musical comedy staged in 1916 by the Tutt Brothers which toured the United States. The musical engaged with current military events of 1916 involving the all-black 10th Cavalry Regiment's involvement in the Pancho Villa Expedition of the Mexican Revolution in February 1916 and the Allied Powers and Central Powers in Turkey in 1916 during World War I.

== Plot ==
Setting: Newtown, United States; a ship on the Atlantic Ocean; and Turkey, 1916 during the events of the Mexican Revolution and World War I

The musical begins in the fictional all-black town of Newtown somewhere in the United States where older African American veterans are at odds over the topic of military preparedness and the use of volunteer militias with the younger citizens of the town. After the town receives word about the all-black 10th Cavalry Regiment's involvement in the Pancho Villa Expedition of 1916 during the Mexican Revolution, the older and younger citizens of Newtown join to form a militia to aid the 10th Cavalry Regiment in its cause.

Mexican spies invade the town of Newtown but fail in their attempt to dissuade the Newtown militia from joining the 10th Cavalry Regiment. The Mexican spies succeed in tricking the Newton militia to board a vessel controlled by the Mexicans and end up never reaching Mexico. After many misadventures, the Newtown militia ends up in Turkish territory during World War I and are forced to fight for the wrong side against the Allied Powers. The play ends happily when the regiment is rescued by an American ship.

== History ==
Characters depicted included George Washington Bullion, who was part of previous Tutt brother farces including George Washington Bullion (1910) and George Washington Bullion Abroad (1915). The show had an African American cast.

It was scheduled to play at the Academy of Music in Richmond, Virginia. It was also booked at the Opera House in Americus, Georgia. The show starred the Tutt brothers as well as Blanche Thompson along with a large supporting cast. T. L. Corwell was announced as the show's manager. It was billed for the Brandeis Theater in Omaha, Nebraska which advertised it above an upcoming screen of The Birth of a Nation.

The Paragon Ragtime Orchestra recorded a Clarence G. Wilson song from the show titled Zoo-Step. It is on the album Black Manhattan, Volume 3.
