= The Broken Violin =

The Broken Violin may refer to:

- The Broken Violin (1908 film), a silent French film by Georges Méliès
- The Broken Violin (1923 film) an American silent film directed by John Francis Dillon
- The Broken Violin (1928 film), an American film by Oscar Micheaux

== See also ==
- Tsubrokhene fidl ('Broken fiddle' or 'Broken violin'), a 1918 composition by Joseph Rumshinsky
