= George Washington Bullion =

1910 musical comedy by the Tutt Brothers

George Washington Bullion was a popular and long running three act musical comedy by the Tutt Brothers, Salem Tutt Whitney and J. Homer Tutt that debuted in 1910. Trevor L. Corwell, a white English impresario helped book the show. The storyline featured a black tobacco plantation owner aspiring to join high society. The Tutt brothers’ shows George Washington Bullion Abroad and How Newtown Prepared followed up on the characters in 1915 and 1916. Both shows had the characters of Washington and fellow veterans leaving to fight in foreign wars.

The Tutt brothers held the lead roles and were supported by various singers and dancers. The Indianapolis Freeman lauded the show and its performers.

The brothers followed it up with their Broadway production Oh Joy!. They also staged with James Vaughn George Washington Bullion Abroad. It was credited as the first musical to include a blues song.

A songsheet for the show's song "Manyanna" sung by Blanche Thompson was published.
