= Thirty Years Later =

1928 American black and white silent drama film

- Directed by: Oscar Micheaux
- Produced by: Oscar Micheaux
- Starring: William Edmonson; Mabel Kelly; A.B. DeComathiere; Ardelle Dabney; Gertrude Snelson
- Production company: Micheaux Films
- Release date: 28 February 1928; (USA)
- Country: USA
- Language: None

Thirty Years Later, is a 1928 American black and white silent drama film directed and produced by Oscar Micheaux for Micheaux Films. Thirty Years Later film was based on Henry Francis Downing' The Racial Tangle. The film stars William Edmonson and Mabel Kelly in the lead roles, whereas A.B. DeComathiere, Ardelle Dabney and Gertrude Snelson made supportive roles.

The film is presumed lost.

== Cast ==
- William Edmonson as George Eldridge Van Paul
- Mabel Kelly as Hester Morgan
- A.B. DeComathiere as Habisham Strutt
- Ardelle Dabney as Clara Booker
- Gertrude Snelson as Mrs. Van Paul
- Barrington Carter
- Madame Robinson
- Arthur Ray
- Ruth Williams
