= A Daughter of the Congo =

1930 film

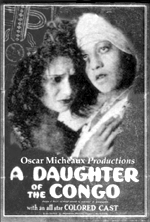
- Film poster
- Directed by: Oscar Micheaux
- Written by: Oscar Micheaux
- Produced by: Oscar Micheaux
- Starring: Katherine Noisette; Lorenzo Tucker
- Distributed by: Micheaux Film Corporation
- Release date: 1930
- Running time: Nine reels
- Country: United States
- Language: silent

A Daughter of the Congo is a 1930 American race film directed, written and produced by Oscar Micheaux. The film is loosely based on the novel The American Cavalryman (1917), by African-American novelist and playwright Henry Francis Downing. It is considered a lost film.

== Plot ==
Lupelta is a mixed-race Congolese girl who was stolen at birth and raised by a hostile tribe. She is designated to marry a tribal chief, but on her way to the wedding she is abducted by Arab slave traders. Before she is sold into slavery, she is rescued by an African-American military battalion under the command of Captain Paul Dale. Dale brings Lupelta to a mission school, where she is successfully acquainted with Western-style civilization. However, she never completely loses touch with the tribal customs and influences that shaped her formative years.

== Cast ==
- Kathleen Noisette as Lupelta
- Lorenzo Tucker as Captain Paul Dale
- Salem Tutt Whitney as Kojo
- Willor Lee Guilford
- Roland C. Irving as Lt. Brown
- Joe Byrd as Whereaboe
- Wilhelmina Williams as Ressha
- Clarence Redd as Lodango
- Alice B. Russell as Miss Pattie
- Charles R. Moore as John Calvert
- Gertrude Snelson as Calvert's Sister
- Percy Verwayen as Pidgy Muffy
- Madame Robinson as Lobue
- Daisy Harding as Singer
- 'Speedy' Wilson as Mwamba

== Production ==
A Daughter of the Congo was the last silent film created by Oscar Micheaux, one of the most prominent African-American filmmakers of the race film genre. Since silent films were considered to have little commercial value in 1930, Micheaux released the film as a “talking, singing, dancing picture” – although it only contained a single short sound sequence that included a performance of the song “That Gets It” by Roland Irving and Earl B. Westfield.

Noisette had previously starred in Micheaux’s 1929 When Men Betray and worked for him again in his first sound film, The Exile (1931). Tucker, who also appeared in Micheaux’s films, was promoted as a “black Valentino” because of his good looks and dashing on-screen persona.

== Criticism ==
A Daughter of the Congo received severe criticism from Theophilus Lewis, a columnist with the Amsterdam News, an African-American weekly newspaper in New York City. Lewis took Micheaux to task for his presentation of African society and for perceived racism in the cast through his selection of actors by skin color. Lewis wrote: "The scene is laid in a not so mythical republic in Africa. Half of the characters wear European clothes and are supposed to be civilized, while the other half wear their birthday suits and some feathers and are supposed to be savages. All the noble characters are high yellows; all the ignoble ones are black. It is based on a false assumption that has no connection with the realities of life."

== See also ==
- List of lost films
