= As the World Rolls On =

1921 drama film

As the World Rolls On, also known by its working title The Heart of Jack Johnson, is a 1921 drama film starring Jack Johnson. It was an Andlauer Productions film. It was advertised as featuring an "All-Star Colored Cast". The film features footage of National Negro League baseball games. It is a 7-reel film.

The storyline of the film features Johnson teaching physical fitness to a weak man and an attempt to frame someone for a crime. Newspaper publisher Nelson Crews has a cameo in the film. Filming was done in Kansas City, Missouri where the Andlauer production company was based, as well as St. Joseph, Missouri and Topeka.

== Production ==
The film was made by William Anthony Andlauer. He was a theater owner, photographer, and cinematographer.

== Historical significance ==
Up until 2013—when a film clip from 1919 was found in storage at a Georgia plantation—As the World Rolls On was the earliest known film to show African-American baseball players, containing "footage of an all-black Kansas team."

== Cast ==
- Jack Johnson as himself
- Blanche Thompson as Molly Moran
- Reed Thomas as Joe Walker
- Walter Simpson as Tom Atkins
- Versia Rice
- Sam Crawford as himself
- Bruce Petway as himself
- Rube Foster as himself
- Cristóbal Torriente as himself

== See also ==
- For His Mother's Sake (another film starring Johnson)
