= Alice Russell =

Alice Russell may refer to:

- Alice Russell (singer) (born 1975), British soul singer
- Alice B. Russell (1889–1985), American actress
