= Ephraim Williams (disambiguation) =

Ephraim Williams (1715–1755) was an American soldier; benefactor of Williams College in Massachusetts.

Ephraim Williams may also refer to:

- Ephraim Williams Sr. (1691–1754), colonial Massachusetts surveyor and land owner, instrumental in dispossession of the Mohicans
- Ephraim S. Williams (1802–1890), mayor of Flint, Michigan
- Ephraim Williams (footballer) (1877–1954), Druids F.C. and Wales international footballer
- Ephraim Williams (circus owner) (1860–1921), African American variety show proprietor
- Ephraim Williams (mariner), 19th-century American sealer from Stonington, Connecticut, see Express Island
- Ephraim Williams, a ship sunk off North Carolina in 1884; see wreck of the Ephraim Williams
