= Donald Heywood =

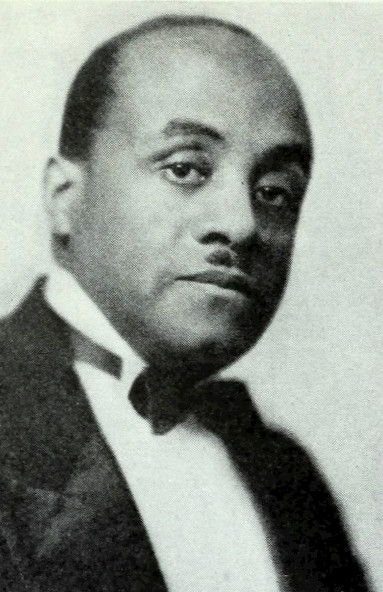
- Born: October 24, 1896; Tunapuna, Trinidad and Tobago
- Died: January 13, 1967 (aged 70); Manhattan, New York (state)

Donald Heywood (24 October 1896 – 13 January 1967) was a Trinidadian-born American songwriter, composer, writer and director. He composed for "I'm Coming Virginia" in 1926, which became a hit for Ethel Waters. He became a prominent figure in black musical theater, and produced scores for films such as Moon Over Harlem (1939) and Murder on Lenox Avenue (1941).

== Biography ==
=== Early years ===
Heywood born in Tunapuna, Trinidad and Tobago, in 1896. (Note: Another source says he was born in 1901. Other sources say he was born in Venezuela of West Indian descent.) He showed an aptitude for playing the piano and with other stringed instruments at an early age. Heywood's father, a physician, was intent that his son follow in his footsteps, and sent young Heywood to college at Queens Royal College in Trinidad, and then to Fisk University in Nashville. (Note: Some sources say Heywood studied music at Fisk.) Heywood studied at Fisk for two years before moving on to Northwestern University in Evanston, Illinois for medical studies.

During his time at Northwestern, Heywood's interest in music began to take precedence over his medical education. He moved to New York and began studying music at Mordkin Moser Conservatory. In 1923, he got his first professional music-related job. Heywood composed music for The North Ain't South, which was performed at Harlem's Lafayette Theatre.

=== Records, radio and Broadway ===
Heywood worked RCA Victor by the early 1920s. (Note: Donald Heywood's West Indian Band provided the backing for Sam Manning's rendition of "Touch Me All About, But Don't Touch Me Dey".) On 29 August 1923 his "I Want My Sweet Daddy Now" was recorded by Rosa Henderson. (Note: There were seven takes of this recording. The first was on August 29, 1923 and the last on September 19, 1923. According to Victor's records, all masters of these recordings have been destroyed.) Around 1925, he composed the instrumental "Charleston Ball". Some notable versions of the song were The Georgia Melodians who recorded it on January 15, 1926. Harry Reser's 1920s hot-comic group, "Six Jumping Jacks" recorded the song on January 27, 1926, with their personnel consisting of Earl Oliver (trumpet), Sammy Lewis (trombone), Larry Abbott (alto saxophone & clarinet), Jimmy Johnston (bass saxophone), Bill Wirges (piano & accordion), Harry Reser (banjo), and Tom Stacks (drum set & cockcrow—screeching sound effect). On February 2, 1926 it was recorded by the Charles Dornberger Orchestra. Heywood composed "I'm Coming Virginia", teaming with Will Marion Cook who added the lyrics. It is often wrongly attributed to vocalist Ethel Waters, who first recorded it on September 18, 1926 on the Columbia Records label with Cook’s Singing Orchestra, though she is credited with popularizing it. Trumpeter Bix Beiderbecke, pianist Fats Waller and the Paul Whiteman Orchestra featuring Bing Crosby all recorded it in 1927. The song has become a jazz standard, popular with Dixieland musicians and was recorded by many other artists including Benny Goodman in 1938.

In 1927, Heywood continued his collaboration with Waters, recording tunes such as "Keep an Eye on Your Man", "I Want My Sweet Daddy Now" and "Clorinda" with her. Heywood and Waters made their Broadway debuts on July 11, 1927 with the Heywood-written revue, Africana. Heywood also performed in the musical he had written when a replacement was needed for cast member Louis Douglas. The role called for someone who spoke fluent French; Heywood had studied the language when at Fisk and Northwestern. The song "Clorinda" was part of the original score with "I Want My Sweet Daddy Now" added after the revue's first performance. (Note: Heywood's name has been misspelled at the Internet Broadway Database as "Heyward") The production ran for 72 performances at the Nederlander Theatre and put Waters on the road to stardom.

The same year, Heywood's "Mango Lane" and "Susanne" was recorded by Dan Michaels and Hilda Perleno, singing as a duet, with Heywood accompanying them on piano. On 4 January 1928, the Paul Whiteman Orchestra recorded Heywood's "Smile". Heywood also made regular radio appearances with Hilda Perleno on WCGU during 1928. By 1929, he had a local radio program of his own. In 1931, Cab Calloway recorded his song "Black Rhythm," a canny parody of stereotypes about black music.

=== Theater and film ===
In the early 1930s, Heywood capitalized on the surge in popularity of plays with all-black casts, often with religious themes. He became known for his work in black musical theater. Heywood's "The Black King", based on Marcus Garvey's life was a success on Broadway under Léonide Massine, prompting him to approach Bud Pollard to direct a screen version in 1932. Heywood was later a film score composer for films such as Moon Over Harlem (1939) and Murder on Lenox Avenue (1941). For Murder on Lenox Avenue he wrote the songs "Trying to Forget", "I'll Get Even With You, and "What You Know About That". He also appeared in films; Oscar Micheaux's 1931 film, The Exile, featured Heywood's musical score and his appearance as "Don Heywood and his Band". He appeared in Micheaux's film Veiled Aristocrats and arranged the music for Ten Minutes to Live with a role as the master of ceremonies in the film.

Heywood died in New York City in 1967 of unknown circumstances.

== Theater ==
- North Ain't South
- Africana (1927)

== Filmography ==
=== Composer ===
- Ten Minutes to Live (1932)
- Veiled Aristocrats (1932)
- The Black King (film) (1932), based on the story of Marcus Garvey's life
- Moon Over Harlem (1939)
- Murder on Lenox Avenue (1941)

=== As performer ===
- The Exile (1931)
- Veiled Aristocrats (1932)
- Ten Minutes to Live (1932)
