= Mary Watkins (disambiguation) =

Mary Watkins (born 1939) is an American composer and pianist.

Mary Watkins may also refer to:

- Mary Jane Watkins (dentist) (1902–1977), American actress, dentist, and Women's Army Corps soldier
- Mary Philadelphia Watkins, birth name of Mary Philadelphia Merrifield (1804–1889), British writer on art and fashion
- Mary Watkins, Baroness Watkins of Tavistock (born 1955), British professor of nursing
- Mary Watkins Cushing (1889–1974), American music and dance writer
