= Princess White =

- Also known as: Princess White Durrah
- Born: January 14, 1881; Philadelphia, Pennsylvania, United States
- Died: March 21, 1976 (aged 95) Mamaroneck, New York, U.S.
- Genres: Blues, vaudeville
- Instrument: Vocals
- Years active: 1880s-1940s, 1975-1976

Princess White (January 14, 1881 – March 21, 1976) was an American blues singer, dancer, comedian and vaudeville performer.

Born Princess White in Philadelphia, of part-American Indian descent, she started her career as a child dancer, touring with Salica Bryan and her Pickaninnies nationally and as far as Europe and Australia. Until the late 1930s, she worked as a touring performer on the Theatre Owners Booking Association (TOBA) circuit, and with such shows as Silas Green from New Orleans. She worked with such performers as Black Patti, Ida Cox, Butterbeans and Susie, and the Whitman Sisters, and became a headlining act in her own right. Among her songs were "Hesitating Blues", "Peepin’ in the Wrong Keyhole" and "Every Woman's Blues."

During World War II, she performed and toured with the USO, but retired from performing shortly after the war. In later years she lived in Newark, New Jersey, where she ran bars and nightclubs before becoming a senior member of her church. After being rediscovered by bandleader Clyde Bernhardt when in her nineties, she came out of retirement and made occasional performances with Bernhardt's Harlem Blues and Jazz Band. She was a featured singer on Bernhardt's 1975 album, Sittin' On Top of the World, performing the title song.

She died after collapsing backstage at a 1976 performance with Bernhardt in Mamaroneck, New York.

She was married "eight or nine" times, by her own recollection. Her last husband was Fred Durrah.
