= Easy Street (1930 film) =

1930 American film

Easy Street is a lost 1930 American film by Oscar Micheaux, an African American filmmaker. It features an African American cast. It is known as the last silent achievement in his filmography The cast included Richard B. Harrison and other actors from the Broadway production Green Pastures. Micheaux's wife Alice B. Russell was part of the cast.

A poster for the film is extant.

== Plot ==
The plot reportedly revolved around a group of con artists trying to seize the savings of an old man.

== Cast ==
- Richard B. Harrison
- Alice B. Russell
- William A. Clayton
- Willor Lee Guilford
- Lorenzo Tucker
