= Henry Francis Downing =

American writer (1846–1928)

Henry Francis Downing (c. 1846 – 19 February 1928) was an African-American sailor, politician, dramatist and novelist. His cousin was Hilary R. W. Johnson, the first African-born president of Liberia (1884–92).

== Biography ==
Henry Francis Downing was born in New York City and named for his father Henry. His paternal grandfather was noted caterer and oyster seller Thomas Downing. Among Downing's uncles was noted caterer and abolitionist George T. Downing, who ran successful businesses in New York, Newport, Rhode Island, and Washington, DC.

In 1864 Downing joined the U.S. Navy at the Brooklyn Navy Yard. According to BlackPast.org, "Navy records listed him as having deserted in 1865, though it was later revealed he left the ship to attend his stepfather’s funeral, and his mother had obtained his discharge so that he could assist her". After the US Civil War, Downing started on a journey around the world, and reached the American colony of Liberia, where he lived for three years. On his return to the US in 1872, he again enlisted in the navy, serving until 1875.

In 1887, Grover Cleveland appointed Downing as consul to Luanda, Angola, but he resigned in 1888. In late 1890, he led the African Americans of New York City to tender to the Comte de Paris. In early 1891, Judge William H. Amoux, Chairman of the Committee of 200 Pan-Republican Congress, appointed Downing, along with other prominent men, to the Committee of Plan and Scope.

The next month, Downing became one of the first African Americans to dine with Reform Democrats. In June 1892, Downing, a lifelong Democrat, joined other African Americans at the Democratic headquarters. They believed they had to look for alternative alliances than the Republican Party. Meanwhile, he sued Sils and Son, the proprietors of a Brooklyn restaurant, for $10,000 over the spread of cholera. By then, Downing had become the editor of the Brooklyn Messenger. On 4 November 1892, the newspaper editor joined C. Holliday of Topeka and George P. H. McVay of Harlem, editor of the Uptown Press, at the College Street Chapel for a discussion.

In 1895, Downing traveled with his wife to London. They chose to stay and lived there for 22 years. He was a participant in the First Pan-African Conference there in 1900.

While in London, Downing concentrated on creative writing, publishing several plays and a novel, The American Cavalryman: A Liberian Romance (1917). Downing was inspired by the life of American actor Ira Frederick Aldridge, who developed a career in performing Shakespeare in London and Europe. Downing was "probably the first person of African descent to have a play of his or her own written and published in Britain."

Returning to the US in 1917, Downing lived in New York City during his final years. He died on 19 February 1928, at the Harlem Hospital.

== Legacy ==
Black filmmaker Oscar Micheaux based two films on Downing's literary work. Micheaux's Thirty Years Later (1928) is based on a story/novella by Downing, and the film A Daughter of the Congo (1930) is based on Downing's The American Cavalryman.

== Plays ==
- The Shuttlecock; or Israel in Russia: An Original Drama in Four Acts (1913)
- Human Nature, or The Traduced Wife: An Original English Domestic Drama, in Four Acts (1913)
- The Arabian Lovers: Or the Sacred Jar; an Eastern Tale in Four Acts (1913)
- Placing Paul's Play; A Miniature Comedy (1913)
- Lord Eldred's Other Daughter: An Original Comedy in Four Acts (1913)
- Incentives: A Drama in Four Acts (1914)
- A New Coon in Town: A Farcical Comedy Made in England (1914)
- Voodoo: A Drama in Four Acts (1914)
