= The Betrayal (1948 film) =

- Film poster
- Directed by: Oscar Micheaux
- Written by: Oscar Micheaux
- Produced by: Oscar Micheaux
- Starring: Leroy Collins; Verlie Cowan; Myra Stanton
- Cinematography: Marvin W. Spoor
- Distributed by: Astor Pictures
- Release date: June 24, 1948
- Running time: 183 minutes
- Country: United States
- Language: English language

The Betrayal is a 1948 American race film written, produced, and directed by Oscar Micheaux. He adapted it from his 1943 novel The Wind From Nowhere.

== Plot ==
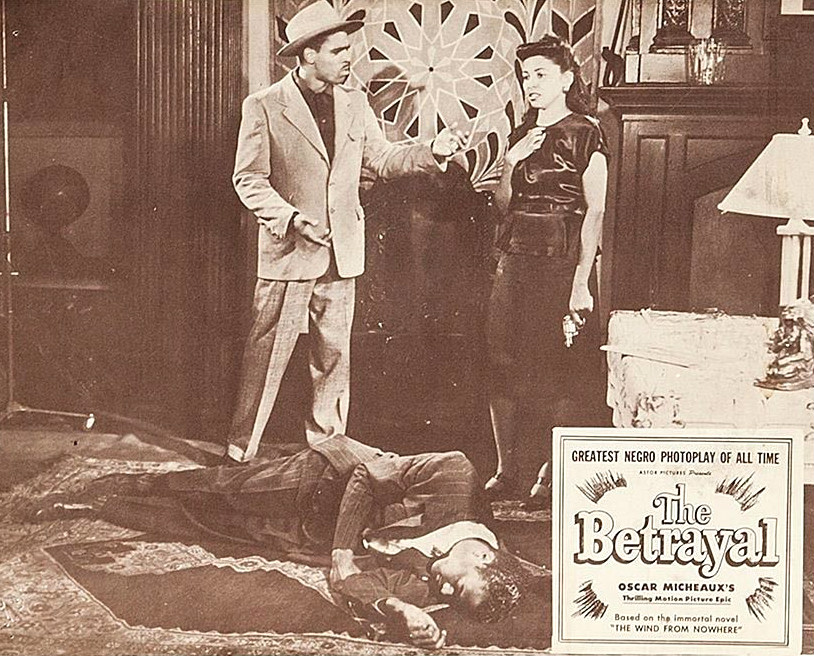
Linda shoots Martin

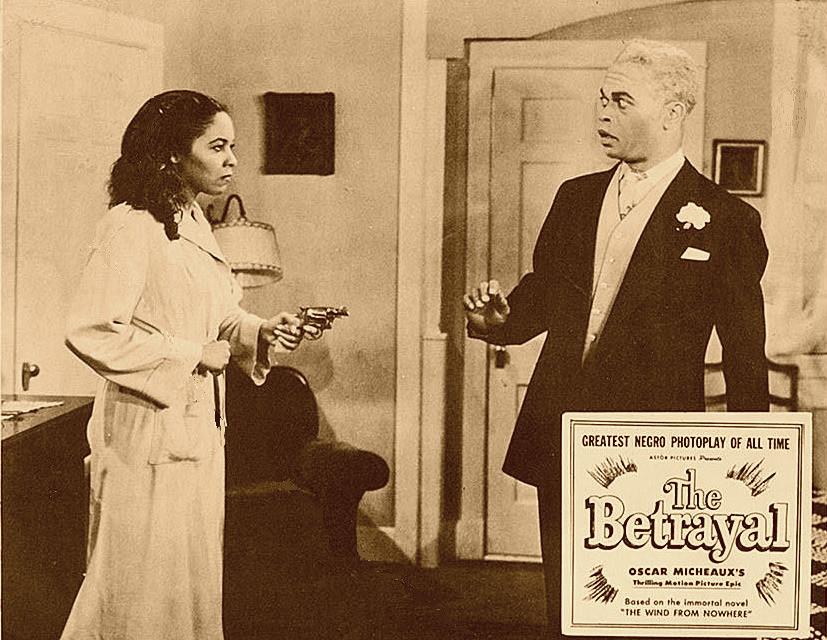
Linda shoots her father, Dr. Lee, for ruining her marriage to Martin

Martin Eden is a successful African-American farmer in South Dakota. He is in love with Deborah Stewart, but he believes that she is white and that she would not be interested in him. He is unaware that Deborah also loves him. Martin goes to Chicago to seek out a wife. After an unsuccessful date with a cabaret singer, he reconnects with an ex-girlfriend who introduces him to Linda. They fall in love and marry, and then return to Martin’s farm. The couple become parents, but their happiness is short-lived when Linda’s pathologically jealous father convinces her that Martin is homicidal. She flees the farm with their child and returns to Chicago. Martin tracks her down in the city, but Martin is shot by Linda during a fight. In South Dakota, Deborah discovers she is African-American. She travels to Chicago and meets Linda, who agrees to divorce Martin so he can marry Deborah. Linda also gives her child to Deborah to raise. Martin and Deborah return to South Dakota and Linda kills her father in revenge for his role in destroying her marriage.

== Cast ==
- William Byrd as Jack Stewart
- Leroy Collins as Martin Eden
- Verlie Cowan as Linda
- Frances De Young as Mrs. Bowles
- Vernon B. Duncan as Duval
- Edward Fraction as Nelson Boudreaux
- Harris Gaines as Dr. Lee
- Jessie Johnson as Preble
- Barbara Lee as Jessie
- Yvonne Machen as Terry
- Arthur McCoo as Joe Bowles
- Vernetties Moore as Eunice
- Alice B. Russell as Aunt Mary
- Myra Stanton as Deborah
- Lou Vernon as Ned Washington

== Production ==
The Betrayal was adapted by Micheaux from his novel The Wind From Nowhere (1943), although the plot regarding racial identities in rural South Dakota was borrowed from The Homesteader (1919), Micheaux’s first film. The Betrayal marked Micheaux’s return to filmmaking after an eight-year absence following the release of The Notorious Elinor Lee (1940).

Micheaux shot The Betrayal at a studio in Fort Lee, New Jersey, with location filming in Chicago.

Micheaux named his male lead Martin Eden in honor of the eponymous hero of the Jack London novel. Leroy Collins, a non-professional actor, was cast in the role when he came to the Chicago set seeking work as a stagehand and was spotted by one of Micheaux’s assistants. This was Collins’ first and only film appearance. Collins (1923-2013) later worked as a Chicago Public Schools administrator.

Myra Stanton, who played the role of Deborah Stewart, had modeled since the age of five. She had appeared in Ebony magazine in her teenage years and had only acted in school plays when Micheaux's wife, Alice B. Russell, called Stanton's mother with an invitation to audition for the film. Collins and Stanton fell in love during the filming and married soon after the film was done. The couple divorced four years later. Stanton is now a retired teacher.

The Betrayal was self-financed by Micheaux. The director’s cut ran 195 minutes, however twelve minutes were cut for its commercial release.

== Release ==
The Betrayal was the first race film to have its premiere in a Broadway venue in New York City, with reserved-seat screenings at the Mansfield Theatre. Reviews of the film were overwhelmingly negative, with The New York Times complaining of "sporadically poor photography and consistently amateurish performances" within a story that "contemplates at considerable length the relations between Negroes and whites as members of the community as well as partners in marriage." Box Office also panned the film, noting "sincerity of purpose is perhaps the only redeeming feature of this all-Negro feature." The African-American media was also hostile, with the Chicago Defender criticizing the film as "a preposterous, tasteless bore".

Presumably, this was the final film released by Oscar Micheaux.

== Preservation status ==
The Betrayal was the last film directed by Micheaux, who died in 1951. No print of The Betrayal is known to exist, and it is considered a lost film, although the script can be found in the New York State Archives (Motion Picture Scripts Collection) in Albany, New York.

== See also ==
- List of lost films
