= Willor Lee Guilford =

African American film actress

- Born: January 13, 1912

Willor Lee Guilford (January 13, 1912 - ?) was an African American actress. She had substantial parts in several films including at least three Oscar Micheaux films.

== Career ==
She portrayed the victim of a stalker in Ten Minutes to Live. In the film, she receives a note from the villain telling her she will be killed in 10 minutes.

== Later life ==
Guilford opened a millinery shop in Brooklyn, New York ("Willor's Hat Shop") after retiring from her film career. She eventually retired to Jacksonville, Florida.

== Filmography ==
- Easy Street (1930)
- A Daughter of the Congo (1930)
- Ten Minutes to Live (1932) as Letha Watkins
- Veiled Aristocrats (1932)
