= Carl Mahon =

US actor in the 20th century

Carl Mahon (February 2, 1906 – September 12, 1992) was an actor in the United States. He had several film roles including a starring role in the 1932 film The Girl from Chicago.

== Early life, family and education ==
Mahon, an African American, was born in Trinidad in 1906.

== Career ==
He portrayed an Ethiopian in Oscar Micheaux's film The Exile. Mahon played the lead role in Micheaux's film The Girl from Chicago. The director's voice is heard telling Mahon, "Well, you've got to give it to her." which Mahon repeats.

== Personal life and demise ==
Mahon died in Merrillville, Indiana in 1992 at age 86.

== Filmography ==
- The Exile (1931), as Jango
- The Girl from Chicago (1932)
- Veiled Aristocrats (1932), as Frank Fowler
- Ten Minutes to Live (1932), as Anthony

== Theater ==
- Porgy
