= Ephraim Williams (circus owner) =

American circus owner and performer

Prof Eph Williams
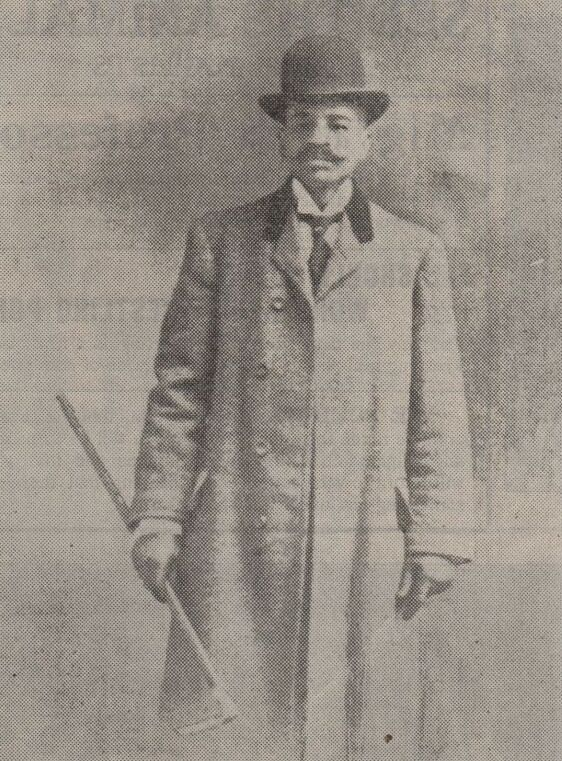
- Williams in 1912
- Born: Ephraim Williams; July 19, 1860; Nashville, Tennessee
- Died: 13 December 1921 (aged 60–61); Jacksonville, Florida
- Burial place: Riverside Cemetery (Oshkosh, Wisconsin)
- Occupations: Circus proprietor; equestrian performer
- Years active: 1885−1921
- Spouse: Rhoda Amelia Black (m. 1892; died 1918)

Ephraim Williams (July 19, 1860 – December 13, 1921) was an American circus owner. Also known as Prof. Eph Williams, he was the first Black circus owner in the United States in the 1880s, and he was likely the only Black circus owner in the country until his death. He owned several circuses including the Ferguson and Williams Monster Show, Professor Williams' Consolidated American and German Railroad Shows, and an all-Black tent show named Silas Green from New Orleans, which became one of the longest-running tent shows in history. He called himself "The Black P.T. Barnum". In 1897, the Freeman newspaper described him as "the only Negro circus owner in America."

== Biography ==
Born in Nashville, Tennessee, Williams spent his formative years in Medford, Wisconsin. In Wisconsin Williams worked at the Briggs Hotel and the "saloon business" and took up "horse training as a hobby." Williams became an accomplished horse trainer, horse performer, and magician under his stage name of Professor Eph. He invested in his first circus in Appleton, Wisconsin, the Ferguson and Williams Monster Show in 1885. While stranded in Iowa, he partnered with Frank Skerbeck and his family, German trapeze artists and sword swallowers to tour small towns under the name Professor Williams' Consolidated American and German Railroad Shows. Based in Wisconsin, this show was made up of fifteen railroad cars, fifty horses, and 150 people, and would tour every season until 1893.

He had an absence from touring until 1896 when he returned to Medford to run the bar at the Hotel Winchester. In 1897, the Freeman newspaper reported that he was "the only Negro circus owner in America" and owned 200 Arabian horses and employed 75 men. In 1901, he moved to Milwaukee where he opened William's Great Northern Shows.

By the summer of 1908, while in Phoebus, Virginia, he partnered with William Baynard on Baynard's and Eph Williams' Famous Troubadours and he "started a tour across the Mason and Dixie Line for the first time in my life." By 1909 he was the sole owner of Eph Williams' Famous Troubadours. In 1913 The Crisis reported the violence faced by Black performers in the USA. In Cleveland, Mississippi some white boys struck one of the horses in the show causing it to bled and fall. A four-year-old child performer was also attacked. The majority white audience also refused to pay for their tickets and the dressing room of the female performers in the company had to be guarded to keep out white men.

After losing his "dog-and-pony circus" in bad weather, he invested in the Silas Green from New Orleans, originally owned by Salem Tutt Whitney. Under Williams' ownership it became the longest-running Black-owned show, until it passed into white ownership after Williams died.

== Personal life ==
In 1892 he married Rhoda Amelia Black (c.1862 - 1918), they had four children. She would often travel with the shows; the Freeman described her as "one of the ablest business women of her race". One of their daughters, Josephine, billed as "Little Baby Josephine", was also a child performer.

== See also ==
- Pablo Fanque
