= The Midnight Ace =

1928 film by John H. Wade

The Midnight Ace is a 1928 American crime film. Abe DeComathiere, Mabel Kelly and Oscar Roy Dugas starred. The film was directed by John H. Wade for Swan Micheaux's Dunbar Film Company. Swan Micheaux was Oscar Micheaux's brother. Swan had worked for Oscar before a falling out over his management of finances. Swan left and formed the Dunbar film company but it only made this film.

The movie's plot depicts a young woman falling for a man who she does not know is a criminal. A detective tracks him down and falls for the woman. The film was adapted from a story by Jack Harrison, and was planned to be the first of several of his stories to be adapted by the film company.

== Cast ==
- Abe DeComathiere
- Mabel Kelly
- Oscar Ray Dugas
- Walter Cornick
- Susie Sutton
