= For His Mother's Sake =

1922 silent film

- Starring: Jack Johnson
- Production company: Blackburn-Velde Pictures
- Distributed by: Fidelity Pictures Company
- Release date: January 1922
- Country: United States
- Language: Silent

For His Mother's Sake is a 1922 American silent film, starring heavyweight boxing champion Jack Johnson. It was a Blackburn-Velde Pictures production distributed by Fidelity Pictures Company. The film opened in January 1922 at the New Douglas Theater at Lexington Avenue and 142nd Street in Harlem. It is believed there was only one five reel print of the movie, due to the studio owners seizing the negative when the film's producers failed to pay their bills.

== Plot ==
Johnson's character in the film flees to Mexico after taking the blame for a crime committed by his brother. It has been described as a "prodigal son" story. Johnson has been described as demonstrating, in this film, in As the World Rolls On, and through his prizefighting, "to a generation of African-American male youth that athletics was one of the few ways out of the ghetto or off the sharecropper's farm."

Mattie Wilkes portrayed Johnson's mother in the sentimental melodrama about a man taking the blame for his brother's crime.

== Banned ==
The Ohio State Bureau of Motion Pictures banned the film because of Johnson's criminal record.

== Cast ==
- Jack Johnson
- Adrian Joyce
- Matty Wilkins / Mattie Wilkins
- Jack Hopkins
- Jack Newton
- Dick Lee
- Hank West
- Everett Godfrey
- Edward McMowan
- Ruth Walker
- Mattie Wilkes
