= The Wages of Sin (1929 film) =

1929 film

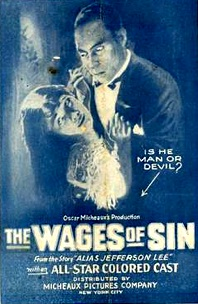
- Directed by: Oscar Micheaux
- Written by: Oscar Micheaux
- Produced by: Oscar Micheaux
- Release date: 1929
- Country: United States
- Language: English

The Wages of Sin is a lost 1929 American drama film directed, written, and produced by Oscar Micheaux. It was a race movie, featuring an all-black cast, headed by William A. Clayton, Jr. and Bessie Givens. The film was made in Pre-Code Hollywood. The film is presumed lost, as there is no known surviving footage of it.

== Cast ==
In alphabetical order

- William A. Clayton, Jr.
- Bessie Givens
- Ione McCarthy
- Kathleen Noisette
- Alice B. Russell
- Ethel Smith
- Lorenzo Tucker
