= The Girl from Chicago =

1932 film

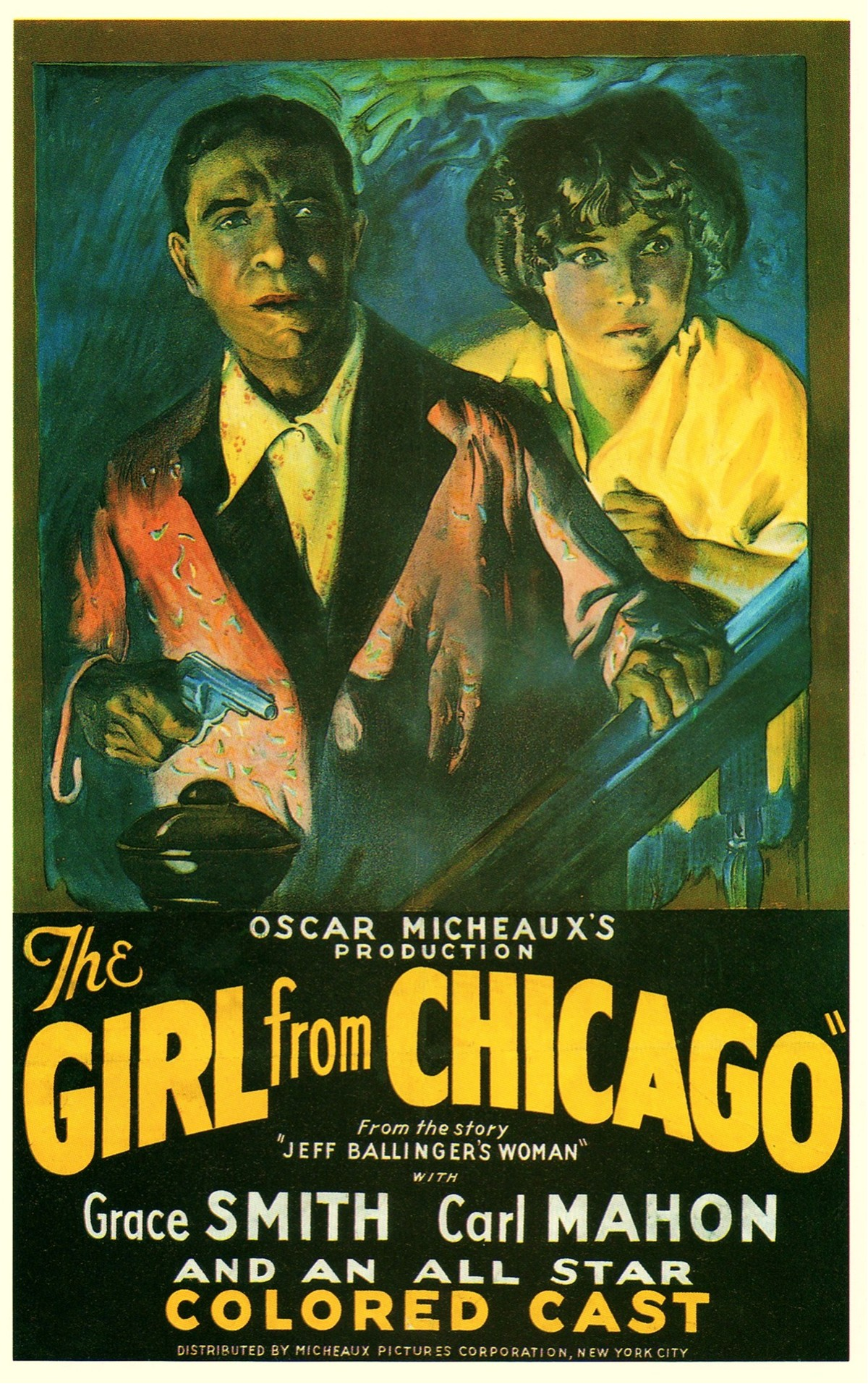
- Film poster
- Directed by: Oscar Micheaux
- Written by: Oscar Micheaux
- Produced by: Oscar Micheaux
- Starring: Grace Smith; Carl Mahon; Eunice Brooks; Starr Calloway; Edwin Cary
- Cinematography: Sam Orleans
- Edited by: Richard Halpenny
- Distributed by: Micheaux Pictures Corporation
- Release date: 1932
- Running time: 70 minutes
- Country: United States
- Language: English

The Girl from Chicago is a 1932 American Pre-Code drama film produced and directed by Oscar Micheaux, with an all-African-American cast including lead actors Grace Smith and Carl Mahon. This film is a remake of the now-lost 1926 Oscar Michaeux silent film The Spider’s Web.

Produced on a shoestring budget, this independent production featured a largely non-professional cast. As it is common in Micheaux's films, the story line is punctuated with several musical numbers, offering a glimpse of African-American musical and dancing talent of the time.

== Plot ==
A federal agent falls in love while on assignment in Mississippi. He helps his lover escape a local thug, and follows them to Harlem in New York City, where they become involved in the assassination of a Cuban racketeer.

== Cast ==
- Carl Mahon - Alonzo White
- Grace Smith - Liza Hatfield
- Juano Hernández - Gomez
- Eunice Brooks - Mary Austin
- Starr Calloway - Norma Shepard (as Star Calloway)
- Alice B. Russell - Miss Warren
- Minto Cato - Mary's sister
- John Everett - Jeff Ballinger
- Frank H. Wilson - Wade Washington
- Edwin Cary - A numbers collector
- Cherokee Thornton - A "Snitch"

== Preservation status ==
- The film is preserved with a copy held in the Library of Congress collection.

== Home media ==
On May 26, 2009, a Region 0 DVD of the movie was released by Alpha Video.
