= Susie Sutton =

American actress

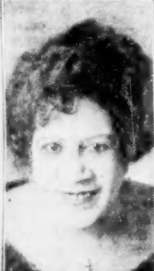
- Press Photo of Susie Sutton (1923)
- Occupations: Actress, performer
- Years active: 1913–1938
- Known for: Theater monologues, member of the Lafayette Players, role in The Green Pastures

Susie Sutton (died February 1956) was an American actress who appeared in theater and films. She was a member of the Lafayette Players from 1917 until 1922 before joining productions by I. M. Weingarden from 1922 to 1924. In later theater productions she continued with Weingarden's company troupe until founding her own vaudeville troupe in 1926 called the Susie Sutton Company, though she also took part in productions with the Alhambra Players in the late 1920s. Her role in The Green Pastures in 1930 as Noah's wife is one of her most well known stage roles.

== Career ==
As a child, Sutton participated in church and sunday school singing and performing. She had a role in a production of "Little Buttercup". Her early theatrical work took place at the Crown Garden Theater in Indianapolis, with her presenting comedic drama monologues such as "The Maid" and "Italian Woman" from 1913 through 1915. This led to her joining the Lafayette Players in 1917 and starred in multiple theater acts with them until 1922. During that time period, she quickly became considered the head of the African American comedy troupe among the Players.

After leaving the troupe in 1922, she joined in with theater productions by showrunner I.M. Weingarden in New York. The immense success of Weingarden's Follow Me show from 1922-1924 resulted in the troupe being frequently referred to as the "Follow Me company" during later presentations and had Sutton attributed as the lead of the show. She was noted for both her comedic and dramatic routines as well as her singing. She did character sketches, skits, and covered popular songs. She also danced.

A followup show named Keep It Up was performed at the Lafayette Theater, with Sutton presenting a singing performance titled "The Bridge of Sighs". The show did not have as much success as Weingarden's previous works. The Follow Me company later started a new show titled the Bon Ton Revue, which they began performing in 1925.

Sutton officially organized the Susie Sutton Company under her name in 1926 as a new vaudeville troupe and performed in theaters throughout the TOBA Circuit and in Nashville, Tennessee. She also continued performing with the Lafayette Players on and off at the Alhambra Theater, until the Players moved to Los Angeles in August 1928. Choosing to stay at the Alhambra Theater, Sutton continued performing as a part of the Alhambra Players. Her role as Noah's wife in the 1930 production of The Green Pastures earned significant praise from critics on Broadway. An attempt to recreate the theater company system akin to the Lafayette Players occurred in 1943, with Sutton being one of several Lafayette members who joined the initial creation.

Sutton became ill in late 1955 and died the following year in February 1956.

== Theater ==
- Keep It Up (1922)
- Follow Me (1922-1924)
- Meek Mose (1928) as Miss Minnie
- The Green Pastures (1930) as Noah's Wife
- Stevedore (April 18, 1934 - July 1934) as Bertha Williams
- Noah (1935) as Noah's Wife
- Haiti (1938)

== Films ==
- The Brute (1920)
- The Midnight Ace (1928)
