= Alice B. Russell =

American actress (1889–1985)

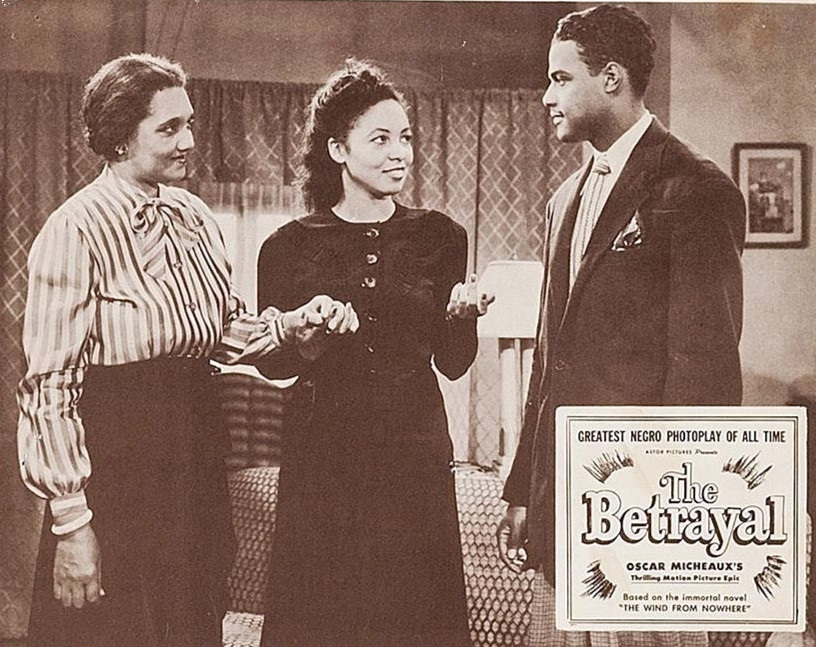
- Russell (at left) in The Betrayal (1948)
- Born: Alice Burton Russell; June 30, 1889; Maxton, North Carolina, U.S.
- Died: January 1, 1985 (aged 95); New Rochelle, New York, U.S.
- Other name: A. Burton Russell
- Years active: 1927–1948
- Spouse: Oscar Micheaux (m. 1926)

Alice Burton Russell (June 30, 1889 – January 1, 1985) was an African-American actress, producer, and the wife of director Oscar Micheaux. She appeared in several films directed by her husband.

== Biography ==
She was born on June 30, 1889 in Maxton, North Carolina. Her parents were M. J. Russell and Robert Russell, who was a prominent newspaper editor, publisher, and politician. She had a sister, Julia Theresa Russell (1898–2000), who appeared in Oscar Micheaux's 1925 film Body and Soul.

Russell and Micheaux married on March 20, 1926, in Montclair, New Jersey.

She began her acting career in silent film, starring in her husband's The Broken Violin (1928). She continued to act after talkies predominated. She was mentioned often as A. Burton Russell in credits. In the 1930s, she produced three films by her husband and worked as miscellaneous crew in two films. She was also credited as a presenter for The Betrayal (1948). This would be the last film for her husband before his death and her final role as a feature film actress.

Living nearly 100 years, she died on the New Year's Day of 1985 in New Rochelle, New York. She was buried in an unmarked grave in Greenwood Cemetery in Rye, New York. Her gravesite is now marked with a stone honoring her achievements in the entertainment industry.

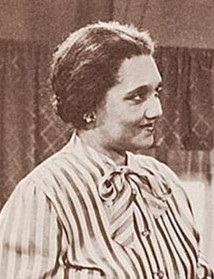
Alice B. Russell

== Filmography ==
As actress:

- The Broken Violin (1928)
- Wages of Sin (1929)
- When Men Betray (1929)
- Easy Street (1930)
- A Daughter of the Congo (1930)
- Veiled Aristocrats (1932)
- Ten Minutes to Live (1932)
- The Girl from Chicago (1932)
- Harlem After Midnight (1934)
- Murder in Harlem (1935)
- God's Step Children (1938)
- Birthright (1939)
- The Betrayal (1948)

As producer:

- Darktown Revue (1931)
- Murder in Harlem (1935)
- Birthright (1939)

As miscellaneous crew:

- Ten Minutes to Live (1932)
- Swing! (1938)

== See also ==
- Oscar Micheaux
