= Mattie Wilkes =

African American theater and film actress

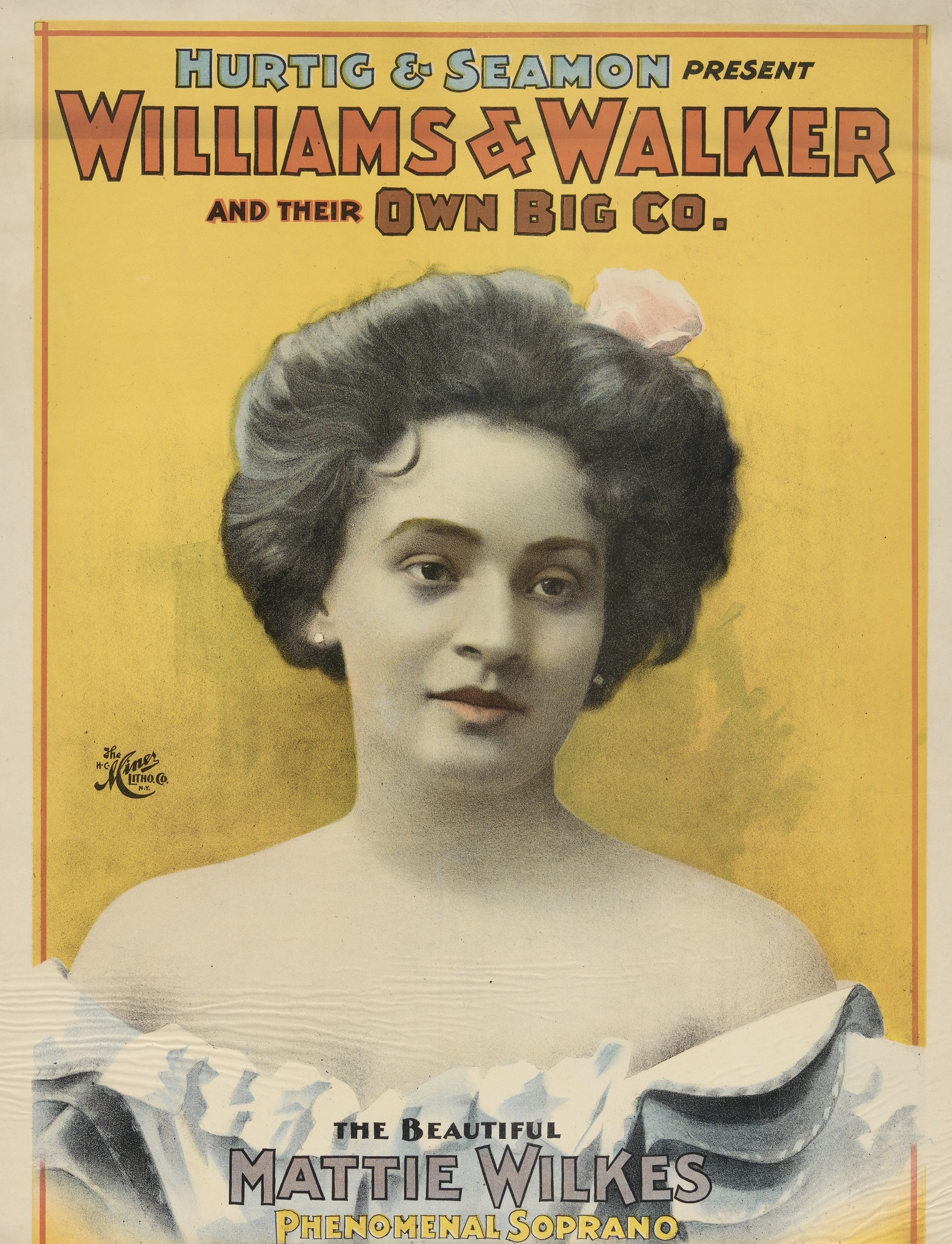
- Poster of Mattie Wilkes circa 1899
- Born: February 14, 1875; Montclair, New Jersey
- Died: July 6, 1927 (aged 52); Pittsburgh, Pennsylvania
- Occupation(s): Vaudeville and film actress
- Years active: 1896-1927

Mattie Vera Wilkes (February 14, 1875 – July 6, 1927) was an African American theater and film actress who appeared in vaudeville shows and films from the 1890s through the 1920s. Beginning as the prima donna for the Williams & Walker Company (Bert Williams and George Walker) in the 1890s, she starred in multiple vaudeville performances as a soprano singer. She would go on to perform in multiple shows alongside Ernest Hogan, whom she would later marry. They would have a falling out, however, within a year and would remain estranged until his death in 1909. During and after, Wilkes would feature in multiple theater shows, including tours across Europe and Russia, even up until her death in 1927.

== Career ==
Born on February 14, 1875, in Montclair, New Jersey to Sarah H. Wilkes, Wilkes started performing in vaudeville as a singer, becoming a member of the vaudeville company Williams & Walker. She performed as a soprano singer in the 1899 production of The Policy Players. Described as the "prima donna of the company" by The Brooklyn Daily Eagle, she was said to have "a rich, cultivated voice, of wide range". During the early 1900s, Wilkes worked with Ernest Hogan's group for songs and plays, acting in the performances he wrote. Despite her falling out with Hogan in 1903, she continued to work with him, though frequently separately, through 1905 before going on a vaudeville tour of Europe in the summer of that year. She also began a tour of vaudeville theatres across Russia in 1911.

The 1925 reproduction of Runnin' Wild was cancelled midseason due to the new road production owners Clifford Gray and Matt Smith failing to pay out the costs for the play. Wilkes herself was noted to have been cut the $700 acting fee she was promised for starring in the production despite her attempts to have the local sheriff seize the money till and all the play's scenery and effects. Commenting on the 1926 production of Lulu Belle, Variety pointed out that in addition to actress Evelyn Preer, Wilkes' role was the only other "valuable" part of the play.

== Theater ==
- Forty Minutes of Grand and Comic Opera (1896)
- Thirty Minutes Around The Operas (1898)
- The Policy Players (1899)
- The Smart Set (1902)
- The Missionary Man (1904)
- The Black Evolution (1905)
- Doings In Coontown (1909)
- A Cowboy Preacher (1916)
- Trilby (1917) as Mrs. Bagot
- Fifty Miles From Boston (1917)
- The Burglar and the Lady (1919) as Annie
- Madame X (1919)
- De Luxe Annie (1919)
- The Silent Witness (1919)
- Shuffle Along (1921–1922) as Mrs. Sam Peck (Mattie Wilks)
- Lulu Belle (1923) as Mrs. Jackson
- Runnin' Wild (1923)

== Filmography ==
- The Symbol of the Unconquered (1920), extant
- The Gunsaulus Mystery (1921)
- For His Mother's Sake (1922) as the mother

== Personal life ==
Wilkes married Ernest Hogan on May 11, 1902, taking on the name of Mattie Crowdus and latter Mattie Hogan after her husband's name change. While still remaining married, they had separated on December 15 of that same year and were seen in multiple public fights in the months following regarding possible divorce and alimony payments. On March 6, 1903, Hogan was arrested after Wilkes accused him of throwing her down two flights of stairs, noting that he had been exhibiting violent tendencies in the year since she married him. Despite Hogan seemingly becoming involved with another woman in the years following, he did not appear to file for divorce with Wilkes, as she is legally listed as his widow upon his death in 1909. She died on July 6, 1927, at her home in Pittsburgh, Pennsylvania.
