= The Black King (film) =

1932 film

- Directed by: Bud Pollard
- Written by: Morris M. Levinson & Donald Heywood
- Starring: A.B. DeComathiere; Knolly Mitchell; Dan Michaels; Mike Jackson; Mary Jane Watkins; Lorenzo Tucker; Trixie Smith
- Edited by: Dal Clawson
- Distributed by: Southland Pictures
- Release date: July 1932
- Running time: 72 minutes
- Country: United States
- Language: English

The Black King is a 1932 comedy-drama race film directed by Bud Pollard. The film chronicles the rise and fall of a fictionalized charismatic leader of a back-to-Africa movement, modeled on the life of Marcus Garvey.

== Themes ==
The Black King chronicles the rise and fall of a fictionalized charismatic leader of a back-to-Africa movement, satirizing the life of Marcus Garvey. The film explores numerous critiques of Garvey's movement, including the lack of knowledge about Africa, the presumptuousness in making plans for future development and government in Africa without consultation of people already there, and conflicts between lighter skinned and darker skinned African Americans. While Garvey was a primarily a political leader with religious opinions, his counterpart in the film was primarily a preacher and religious leader. The film was intended to resonate with the audience's pre-existing disillusionment with Garvey.

== History ==
The Black King was written as a stage play by Donald Heywood and plans were publicly announced to produce it on Broadway directed by Russian choreographer Léonide Massine. This never took place. Instead, Heywood's story was adapted by Morris M. Levinson and it was produced as a film by Southland Pictures under white director Bud Pollard in 1932. The film was re-released in the 1940s under the title, Harlem Big Shot.

== Cast ==
- A.B. DeComathiere as Charcoal Johnson
- Vivianne Baber as Mary Lou Lawton
- Knolly Mitchell as Sug
- Dan Micahels as Brother Longtree
- Mike Jackson as Brother Lawton
- James Dunmore as Nappy
- Harry Gray as Deacon Jones
- Mary Jane Watkins as Mrs. Bottoms
- Freeman Fairley as Mob Leader
- Ishmay Andrews as Mrs. Ashfoot
- Trixie Smith as Delta
- Lorenzo Tucker as Carmichael

== Reception ==
Daniel J. Leab, a 1975 commentator, rates it well as entertainment, saying it has "a more carefully plotted storyline than most other black genre films of its time". Kevin Thomas of the Los Angeles Times wrote in 1988 that despite the film's small budget, the film has "considerable scope and energy ... largely due to a dynamic, brutally comic burlesque of ... [lead actor] A. B. Comathiere".
