= Murder on Lenox Avenue =

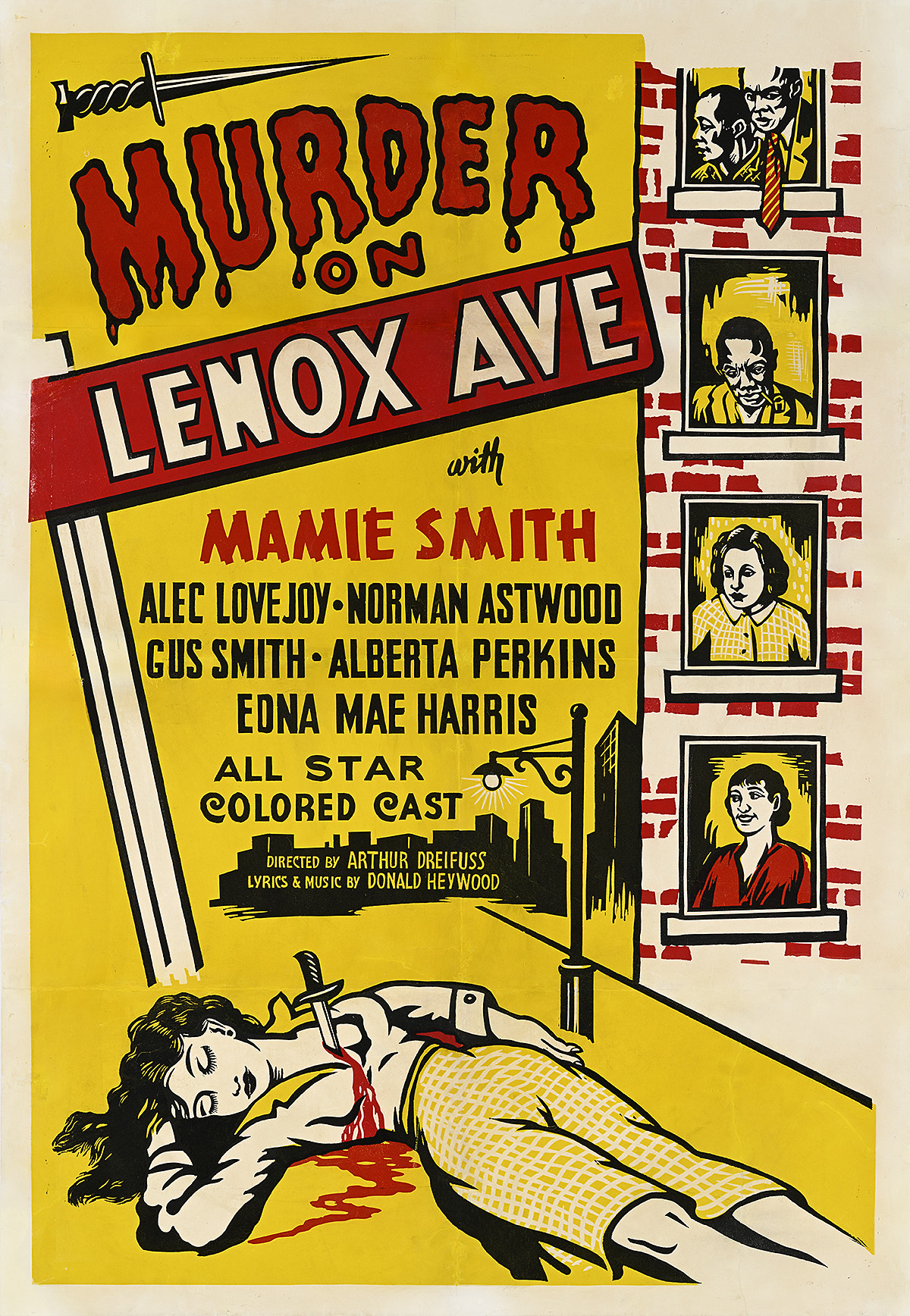
- Directed by: Arthur Dreifuss
- Written by: Frank Wilson (story); Vincent Valentini (writer) and Bryna Ivens (writer)
- Produced by: Arthur Dreifuss
- Starring: See below
- Cinematography: George Webber
- Edited by: Robert O. Crandall
- Music by: Donald Heywood
- Release date: 1941
- Running time: 65 minutes
- Country: United States
- Language: English

Murder on Lenox Avenue is a 1941 American race film directed by Arthur Dreifuss.

== Plot summary ==
In 1941 Harlem, New York City, someone gets framed for a murder while Pa Wilkins tries to replace the apartment building's former manager.

== Cast ==
- Mamie Smith as Hattie
- Alec Lovejoy as Flivver Johnson
- Norman Astwood as Mr. Marshall
- Augustus Smith as Pa Wilkins
- Alberta Perkins as Mercedes
- Edna Mae Harris as Singer
- Sidney Easton as Speed Simmons
- Dene Larry as Ola Wilkins
- Ernie Ransom as Jim Bracton
- Earl Sydnor as Gregory
- Herman Green as Lomax
- George Williams as Montoute
- Cristola Williams as Rosalia
- Emily Santos as Emily
- Flo Lee as Flo
- Wahneta San as Wahneta

== Soundtrack ==
- Alberta Perkins - "Hot Pies" (Written by Donald Heywood)
- Wahneta San - "I'm Trying to Forget You" (Written by Donald Heywood)
- Mamie Smith with Sidney Easton - "I'll Get Even With You" (Written by Donald Heywood)
- Wahneta San with Alec Lovejoy - "What You Know About That?" (Written by Donald Heywood)
