= The Brute (1920 film) =

Lost film by Oscar Micheaux

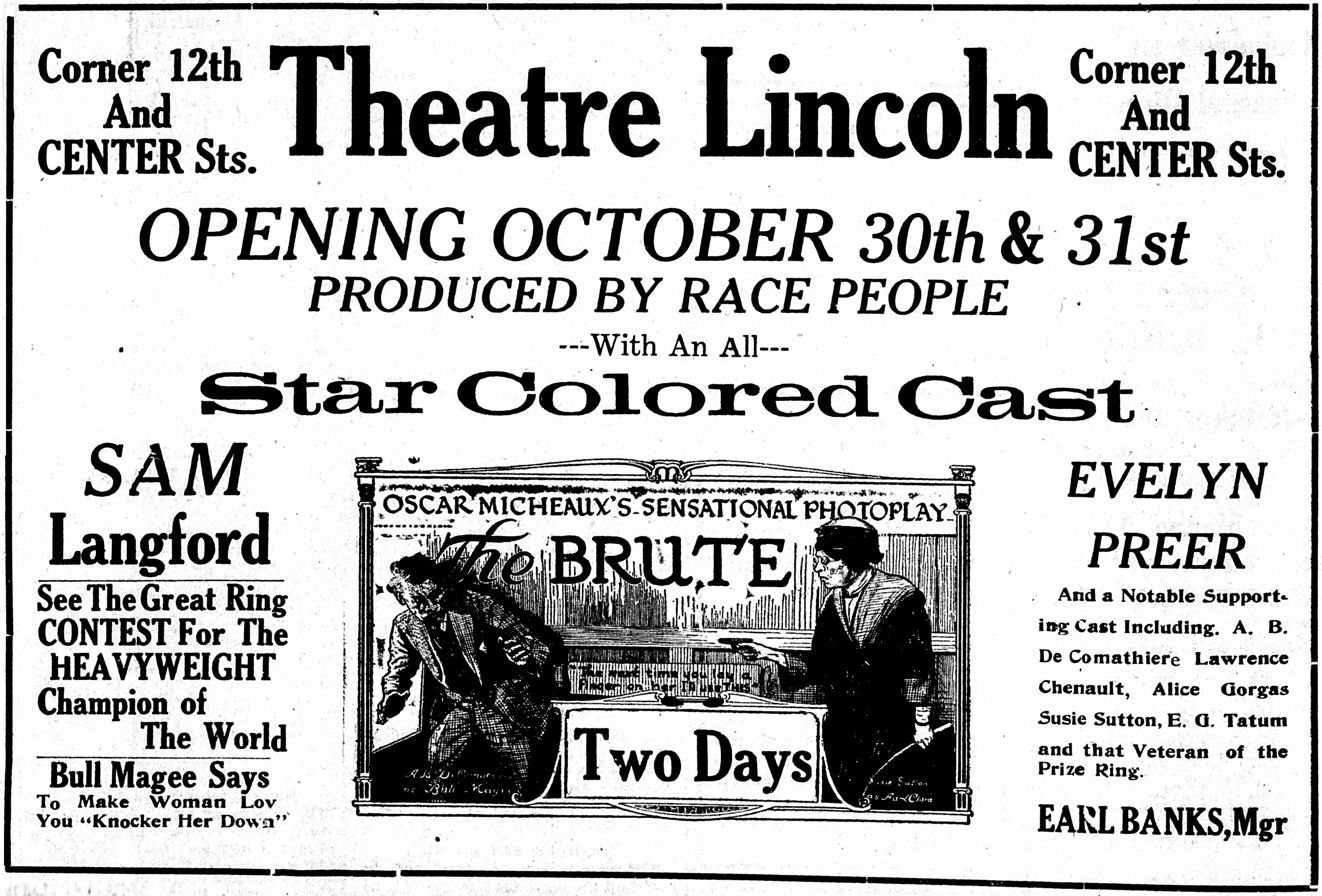
- Newspaper advertisement for the film
- Directed by: Oscar Micheaux
- Written by: Oscar Micheaux
- Produced by: Oscar Micheaux
- Cinematography: "Whitie" (Note: In the records of the George P. Johnson Negro Film Collection, the cameraman was identified only as "Whitie.")
- Production company: Micheaux Film Corp.
- Distributed by: Micheaux Film Corp.
- Release date: 1920
- Running time: 7 reels
- Country: United States
- Language: Silent

The Brute is a 1920 silent race film directed, written, produced and distributed by Oscar Micheaux. No print of the film is known to exist and the production is believed to be a lost film. The original version of the film included a scene where the boxer defeats a white rival, but Micheaux was forced to remove the scene by censors.

== Plot ==
Herbert Lanyon is thought to be dead after a shipwreck, and his fiancée Mildred Carrison is forced by her money-minded Aunt Clara into marriage with "Bull" Magee, a gambler and underworld boss who mistreats Mildred. After Herbert returns, Magee undergoes financial difficulties that he blames on Mildred and Herbert, and seeks revenge. Herbert and a repentant Aunt Clara, however, free Mildred from Magee, and the lovers are able to marry. A subplot involves boxer "Tug" Wilson, who is ordered by his manager Magee to lay down in the seventeenth round of a prizefight at the film's climax. No other information concerning the plot has been discovered.

—American Film Institute

== Cast ==
- Evelyn Preer – Mildred Carrison
- A. B. DeComathiere – Bull Magee
- Sam Langford – Tug Wilson
- Susie Sutton – Aunt Clara
- Lawrence Chenault – Herbert Lanyon
- Laura Bowman – Mrs. Carrison
- Mattie Edwards – Guest in "The Hole"
- Alice Gorgas – Margaret Pendleton
- Virgil Williams – Referee
- Marty Cutler – Sidney Kirkwood
- Floy Clements – Irene Lanyon
- Louis Schooler – Klondike
- Harry Plater
- E. G. Tatum
- Al Gaines

== See also ==
- List of lost films
