= Tutt Brothers =

American vaudeville producers, writers and performers

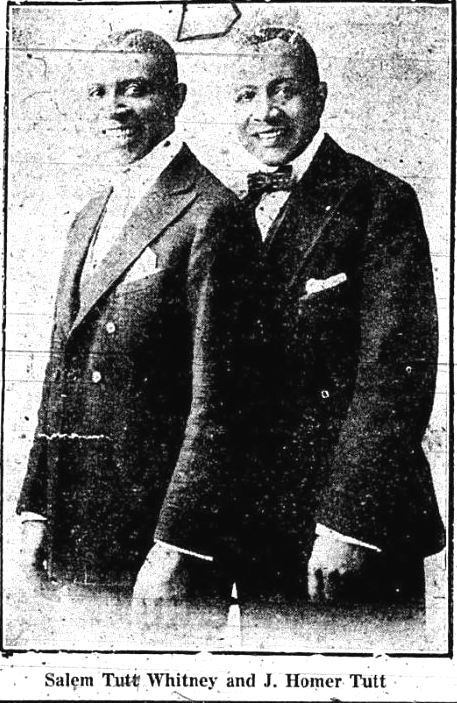
From an advertisement in a 1922 newspaper

Salem Tutt Whitney (né Salem Tutt; November 15, 1875 – February 12, 1934) and J. Homer Tutt (né Jacob Homer Tutt; January 31, 1882 – February 10, 1951), known collectively as the Tutt Brothers, were American vaudeville producers, writers, and performers of the late 19th and early 20th century. They were also known as Whitney & Tutt, Tutt & Whitney and the Whitney Brothers. They were prominent in black vaudeville and created more than forty revues for black audiences.

== Biography ==
Salem Tutt Whitney was born in Logansport, Indiana (birth-year varies: 1869, 1875, 1876, or 1878), as was his brother J. Homer Tutt. They referred to themselves as brothers, and may have been half-brothers. Whitney originally intended to become a minister but later decided to become a performer, and left college. He attended the National School of Journalism and gained amateur experience in acting, comedy and writing.

From 1888 through 1905, the brothers performed in their traveling tent show called Silas Green from New Orleans. The show, which ran until the 1940s, was bought by circus owner Ephraim "Eph" Williams although the brothers never received payment.

They formed the Smart Set Company in the 1910s, possibly taken over from Sherman H. Dudley. (Note: In latter years, it was called The Smarter Set Company, possibly to avoid conflict with the publisher of the magazine The Smart Set.) From 1910 to 1925 Whitney and Tutt produced more than 40 revues for black performers and audiences, writing and performing in the shows themselves. Some of their performers found fame in their own right, including blues singer Mamie Smith, who danced in the brothers' Smart Set as a teenager.

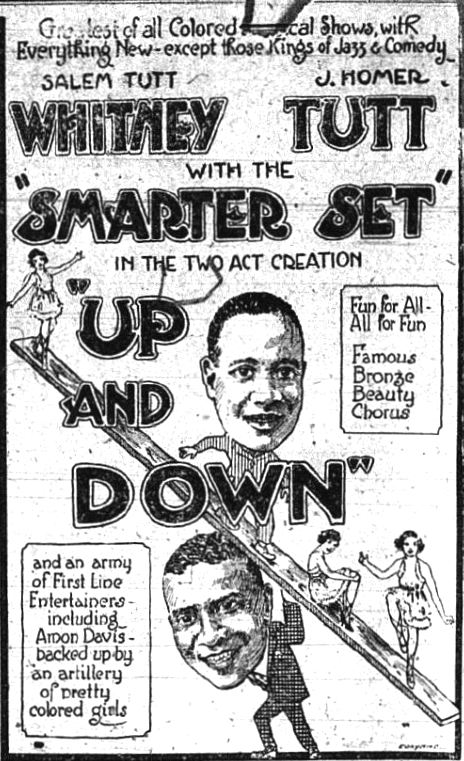

One of the Brothers' main productions was a musical farce called George Washington Bullion. Starring Whitney as a tobacco plantation owner, it was popular with audiences and ran for two decades. Their musical Oh Joy! played on Broadway for four weeks. It had originally starred Ethel Waters when performed in Boston. But when the only theatre space the Brothers could find in New York City was on a tennis court under a tent, Waters pulled out and was replaced by Ethel Williams. Both of the brothers performed in Marc Connelly's play The Green Pastures (1930).

They also acted in films, spanning both silent films and talkies, including Birthright (1924), directed by Oscar Micheaux and adapted from a novel of the same name by T. S. Stribling; Marcus Garland (1925), The Broken Violin (1927), and A Daughter of the Congo (1930).

Salem Tutt Whitney died in Chicago on February 12, 1934, and J. Homer Tutt died in Los Angeles on February 10, 1951.

== Works ==
- Silas Green from New Orleans (c. 1903 – c. 1953)
- Prince Bungaloo (1908)
- Blackville Strollers (1908–1909)
- The Mayor of Newtown (1909)
- George Washington Bullion (1910)
1. "Love Me Anywhere"
2. "Manyanna" ("Land of To-morrow")
3. "Old Kentucky Blues"
4. "Dear Old Southern Moon"
- The Wrong Mr. President (1913)
- His Excellency, the President (1914)
- George Washington Bullion Abroad (1915)
- How Newtown Prepared (1916)
- My People (1917)
- Darkest Americans (1918–1919)
- (The) Children of the Sun (1919–1920)
- Betwixt and Between (1920s)
- Bamboula (1921)
- Small Town Doings (1921)
- Up and Down (1922)
- Jump Steady (1922)
- Oh Joy! (1922)
- North Ain't South (1923)
- Come Along Mandy (1923–1924)
- Who Struck John? (1923–1924)
- Hide and Seek (1924)
- Non-Sense (1925)
- When Malinda Sings (1925)
- Rainbow Chasers (1926)
- Deep Harlem (1929)
- The Witching Eyes (1929) directed by Ernest Stern

== Family ==
Salem Tutt Whitney was married three times, his first to Emma A. Baynard (maiden; 1872–1908) (her second marriage). They married May 6, 1903, in Philadelphia at Crucifixion Episcopal Church – Rev. Henry Laird Phillips (1848–1947), officiating. Rev. Phillips, in 1877, became the first African-American rector of the Crucifixion Church in 1877. Baynard was a sister of William Andrew Baynard, a pianist, who, with Salem and Emma, had, in 1900, performed with the Oriental Troubadours. Emma was a soporano and prima donna with the Troubadours. She previously, on March 17, 1897, in Williamstown, Pennsylvania, married Lewis E. Puggsley (1858–1935), an operatic tenor soloist, with whom she had a son, Baynard Lewis Puggsley (1898–1956). Lewis Puggsley was a brother of Charles Henry Puggsley (1868–1932), who, in 1900, was second tenor and soloist with the Oriental Troubadours.

== Copyrights ==
=== Copyrights ===
- George Washington Bullion Abroad. Music by James J. Vaughan (né James Joseph Jefferson Vaughan; 1874–1945). Lyrics by J. Homer Tutt and S. Tutt Whitney. Library of Congress. OCLC 497482855.

Catalogue of Copyright Entries, Part 3, Musical Compositions, New Series. Library of Congress, Copyright Office.

1. Vol. 10; Part 2, October 1915; No. 10 (1915). "Love Me Anywhere". © Jos. W. Stern & Co., New York; 15 October 1915. 2 c. 27 October 1915. E371361. p. 1176.
2. Vol. 10; Part 2, October 1915; No. 10 (1915). "Manyanna" ("Land of To-morrow"). © Jos. W. Stern & Co., New York; 13 October 1915. 2 c. 27 October 1915. E373166. p. 1056.
3. Vol. 10; Part 2, October 1915; No. 11 (1915). "Old Kentucky Blues". © Jos. W. Stern & Co., New York; 30 October 1915. 2 c. 30 October 1915. E373167. p. 1056.
4. Vol. 10; Part 2, October 1915; No. 12 (1915). "Dear Old Southern Moon". © Jos. W. Stern & Co., New York; 13 October 1915. 2 c. 27 October 1915. E371362. p. 1141.

––––––––––––––––––––

2 c. indicates two copies received, followed by the date.

== Bibliography ==
=== References ===
News media

- Baltimore Sun, The (October 10, 1920). "Some Green Room Gossip". Vol. 18, no. 1. pp. 4, 15 (section 4 at p. 15) – via Newspapers.com.
- California Eagle (March 1, 1951). "Final Rites for Homer Tutt, Retired Actor". Vol. 71, no. 48. p. 11 – via Newspapers.com.
- Cincinnati Enquirer (June 12, 1915). "News of the Courts". Vol. 72, no. 163. p. 7 (column 5, 7th paragraph – "A rather peculiar story ... ") – via Newspapers.com.
- Indianapolis Star (February 14, 1934). "Salem F. Whitney, Negro Actor, Dies" (obituary). Vol. 31, no. 254. p. 4 – via Newspapers.com.
- New York Age (February 17, 1934). "Salem Tutt Whitney, Veteran Actor, Dies in Chicago; Long Ill" (PDF) (obituary). Vol. 48, no. 24. p. 1 – via Fultonhistory.com.
- Philadelphia Inquirer (July 30, 1963). "Charles Taylor" (obituary). Vol. 269, no. 30. p. 24 (column 4) – via Newspapers.com.
- Pittsburgh Courier; Calvin, Floyd J. (né Floyd Joseph Calvin; 1902-1939) (January 1, 1927). "Salem Tutt Whitney Scores Poor Stage Facilities". Vol. 18, no. 1. p. 1 (section 2) – via Newspapers.com.

Books, journals, magazines, and papers

- Abbott, Lynn (born 1946); Seroff, Doug (2007). Ragged but Right: Black Traveling Shows, 'Coon Songs', and the Dark Pathway to Blues and Jazz. American Made Music Series (1st ed.). Jackson: University Press of Mississippi. p. 334. ISBN 9781604731484 – via Google Books. OCLC 793384482. LCCN 2006-15009. ISBN 978-1-6170-3645-3, 1-6170-3645-5, 978-1-6047-3148-4; and ISBN 1-6047-3148-6
- Cullen, Frank; Hackman, Florence; McNeilly, Donald (2007). "Tutt Brothers". Vaudeville Old & New: An Encyclopedia of Variety Performances in America. Vol. 1 of 2. Routledge. p. 1136. ISBN 9780415938532 – via Google Books (Cullen and McNeilly are founders of the American Vaudeville Museum). ISBN 0-415-93853-8. OCLC 162427627 (all editions).
- Hill, Errol; Hatch, James Vernon (1928–2020) (2003). A History of African American Theatre. Cambridge University Press. p. 209. ISBN 9780521624435 – via Google Books. OCLC 915960210 (all editions). ISBN 0521624436.
- Peterson, Bernard Lee, Jr. (1926–2000) (1990). Early Black American Playwrights and Dramatic Writers. Greenwood Press. p. 9. ISBN 0-313-26621-2 – via Google Books (Peterson retired in 1988 as Professor Emeritus of English and Drama, Elizabeth City State University) OCLC 243697847 (all editions). LCCN 90-2961. ISBN 0-313-26621-2.
- Peterson, Bernard Lee, Jr. (1993). "Pugsley Brothers". A Century of Musicals in Black and White – An Encyclopedia of Musical Stage Works by, About, or Involving African Americans. Greenwood Press. pp. 208–209. ISBN 9780313064548 – via Google Books OCLC 1050139804 (all editions). LCCN 92-41976. ISBN 978-0-3130-6454-8.
- Peterson, Bernard Lee, Jr. (1997). "Oriental Troubadours". The African American Theatre Directory, 1816–1960: A Comprehensive Guide to Early Black Theatre Organizations, Companies, Theatres, and Performing Groups. Greenwood Press. p. 159. ISBN 9780313295379 – via Google Books. OCLC 928434607 (all editions). LCCN 96-9534. ISBN 0-313-29537-9.
- Peterson, Bernard Lee, Jr. (2001). "Pugsley Brothers". Profiles of African American Stage Performers and Theatre People, 1816–1960. Greenwood Press. pp. 208–209. ISBN 9780313295348 – via Google Books. OCLC 1126462332. LCCN 99-88456. ISBN 0-3132-9534-4.
- Oliver, Paul (2002). "Smith (née Robinson), Mamie". In Kernfeld, Barry Dean (ed.). The New Grove Dictionary of Jazz. Vol. 3 of 3 (2nd ed.). Oxford University Press. doi:10.1093/gmo/9781561592630.article.J417000. ISBN 1-5615-9284-6. OCLC 5104788497.
- Stearns, Marshall Winslow, PhD (1908–1966); Stearns, Jean (1994) [1971; 1968]. Jazz Dance: The Story of American Vernacular Dance.
1. Collier-Macmillan (1968). OCLC 655466715 (all editions).
2. Macmillan (1971). OCLC 900269 (all editions).
3. Schirmer (1979). OCLC 720681903, 1069868504. ISBN 0-0287-2510-7, 978-0-0287-2510-9.
4. Da Capo Press (paperback) (1994). OCLC 610972997 (all editions). LCCN 93-40957. ISBN 0-3068-0553-7, 978-0-3068-0553-0.
5. Archive.org
6. link
  1. "J. Homer Tutt". pp. 152, 255.
  2. "Salem Tutt-Whitney". pp. 76, 152, 156, 255.
- Workman, Christopher; Howarth, Troy (2016). Tome of Terror: Horror Films of the Silent Era. Midnight Marquee Press. p. 348. ISBN 978-1936168-68-2.
