= Ten Minutes to Live =

1932 film

- Directed by: Oscar Micheaux
- Written by: Oscar Micheaux (adaptation); Oscar Micheaux (story "Harlem After Midnight")
- Produced by: Oscar Micheaux (producer)
- Starring: Lawrence Chenault; A. B. DeComathiere; Laura Bowman; Willor Lee Guilford
- Cinematography: Lester Lang
- Release date: 1932
- Running time: 58 minutes (American DVD)
- Country: United States
- Language: English

Ten Minutes to Live is a 1932 American pre-Code film directed by Oscar Micheaux. It starred Lawrence Chenault, A. B. DeComathiere, Laura Bowman, and Willor Lee Guilford. One of the characters is deaf and much of the dialogue was dubbed offscreen. The film is part of the collection of the Museum of Modern Art.

== Plot summary ==
A producer offers a nightclub singer a role in his latest film, but all he really wants to do is have sex with her. She knows, but accepts anyway. Meanwhile, a patron at the club gets a note saying that she will soon get another note, and that she will be killed ten minutes after that.

== Cast ==
- Lawrence Chenault as Gary Martin
- A. B. DeComathiere as Anthony
- Laura Bowman as Ida Morton
- Willor Lee Guilford as Letha Watkins
- Tressie Mitchell as Charlotte Evans
- Mabel Garrett as Ida Groves
- Carl Mahon as Martin
- Galle De Gaston as Galle
- George Williams as George
- Lorenzo Tucker as The Godfather
- William A. Clayton Jr. as Morvis
- Donald Heywood as Master of Ceremonies
- Arnold Wiley as Tap Dancer

== Soundtrack ==
- Sweet Georgia Brown
