= The Georgia Melodians =

Jazz band of the 1920s

Georgia Melodians were an early jazz band that was active in the 1920s and recorded for Edison. They were from Savannah, Georgia and the joint leaders were Ernie Intelhouse (cor) and Hill Hutchins (cl, ts, bsx). After being together for a few years, they worked their way up the east coast to New York, where they arrived in February 1924. After some changes in personnel, they were playing opposite the Paul Van Loan Orchestra at the Cinderella Ballrom on 48th and Broadway. Around this time they started to record and throughout 1924 they made 26 sides that were released on Edison Diamond Discs. The band broke up towards the end of 1924 and left their regular gig at the Strand Roof, but they stopped recording for Edison on April 9, 1926. Their last booking was a New Year's Eve Ball at the Hotel Alamac.
