= Mary Jane Watkins (dentist) =

American actress and dentist (1902–1977)

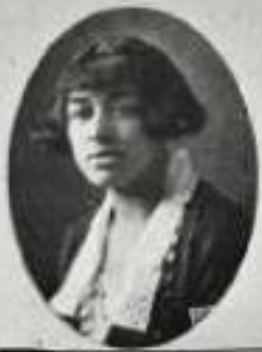
- Mary Jane Watkins, from the 1924 yearbook of Howard University
- Born: September 27, 1902; Columbia, Tennessee, U.S.
- Died: January 11, 1977 (aged 74); Detroit, Michigan, U.S.
- Occupations: Dentist; actress
- Military career
- Allegiance: United States
- Branch: United States Army
- Unit: Women's Army Corps

Mary Jane Watkins (September 27, 1902 – January 11, 1977) was an American actress and dentist, and one of the first Black women to serve in the Women's Army Corps.

== Early life and education ==
Watkins was born in Columbia, Tennessee, the daughter of John Watkins and Maggie Watkins. As a young woman at Morgan College, she and writer Zora Neale Hurston were school friends; Hurston recalled Watkins as "the most sex-appealing thing, with her lush figure and big eyes and soft skin". After Morgan, Watkins attended Howard University, where she graduated from the School of Dentistry in 1924, the only woman in her class. She also played basketball and tennis at Howard, and was founder and president of the Rho Psi Phi, the first Black medical sorority.

== Career ==
Watkins lived in Pittsburgh after dental school, and in 1926 was secretary of the Pittsburgh chapter of the Howard University alumni association. She coached a girls' basketball team; activist Dorothy Height was one of her players. She was also a local tennis champion.

Watkins moved to New York City in 1927; she lived in Harlem and was active in the YWCA, the Business and Professional Women's Club, and other organizations there. In 1930, she and Zora Neale Hurston were among the guests at a reception for West African businessman Winfried Tete-Ansa, held by the Plainfield Negro History Club in New Jersey.

She joined the Women's Army Corps in 1942, becoming one of the first Black women to serve in that corps. In 1960, she spent a year practicing dentistry in Enugu, Nigeria. She taught at the Guggenheim Clinic in New York in the 1960s, training international students in dentistry. From 1964 to 1966, she was vice-president of the North Harlem Dental Society, and in 1965 she was president of the Association of Women Dentists of New York City. She had a dental practice in New York until she retired in 1972.

== Films and stage ==
Watkins was also an actress as a young woman, appearing in the Oscar Micheaux silent film Deceit (1923), and the Bud Pollard sound film The Black King (1932). She also appeared in a musical comedies, including Ol' Man Satan (1932) at the Forrest Theatre and Ham's Daughter (1932) at the Lafayette Theatre.

== Personal life ==
Watkins was briefly rumored to be a love interest of aviator Hubert Julian. She died in Detroit in 1977, aged 74 years, at the home she shared with her sister, Christina Watkins Bishop.
