= The Broken Violin (1923 film) =

1923 silent film

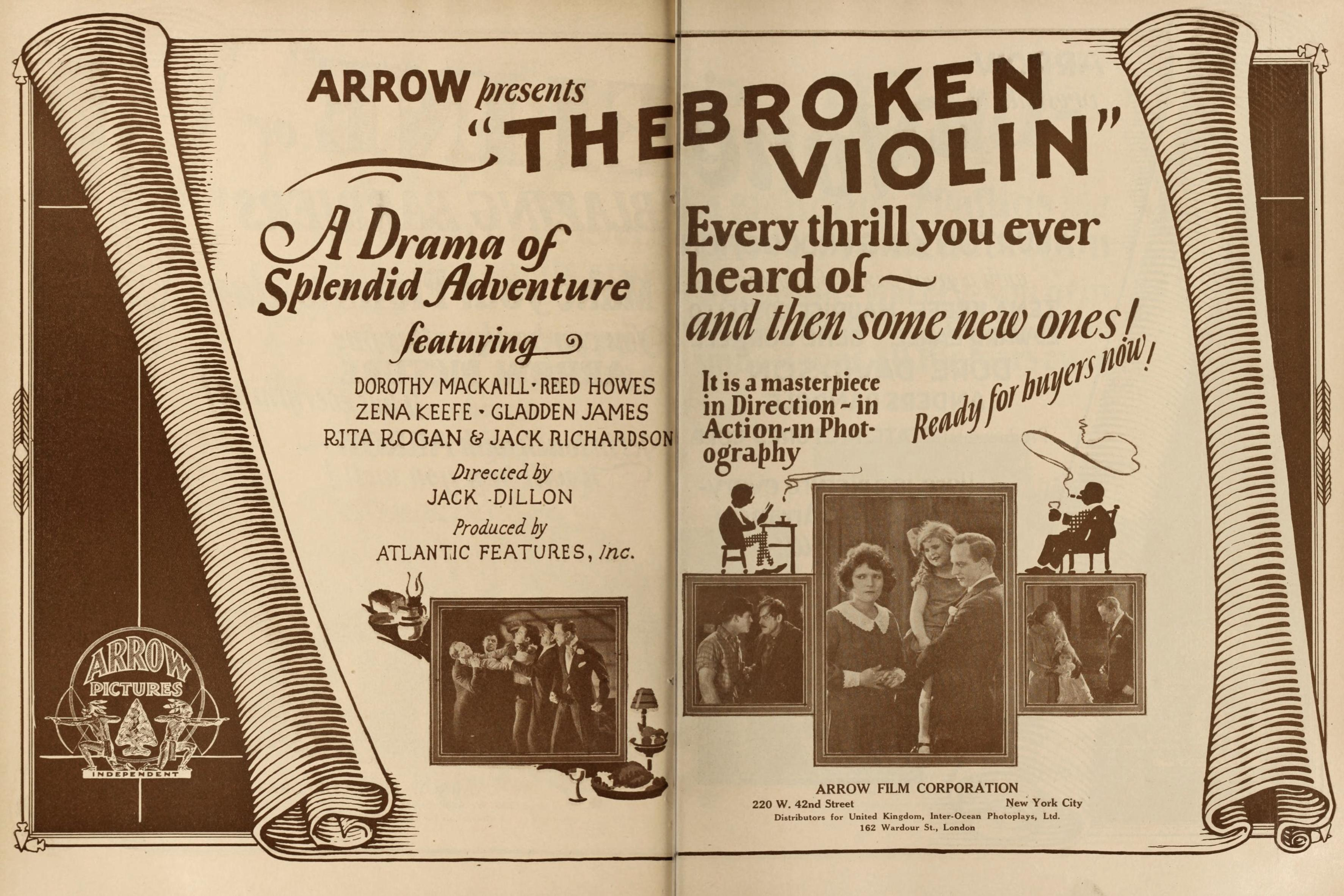
- Directed by: John Francis Dillon
- Written by: George Rogan; Lillian Case Russell
- Starring: Dorothy Mackaill; Reed Howes; Zena Keefe
- Cinematography: George Peters
- Production company: Atlantic Features
- Distributed by: Arrow Film Corporation
- Release date: May 10, 1923
- Running time: 60 minutes
- Country: United States
- Languages: Silent; English intertitles

The Broken Violin is an American film that was released in 1923. It was directed by John Francis Dillon. It was produced by Atlantic Features and distributed by Arrow Film Corporation It is a melodrama. A 1923 publication described the film as "heart interest laid on thick."

== Plot ==
Variety wrote, "The story is of an imposter endeavoring to secure the millions rightfully belonging to another. His ruse works for a time, but the rightful heir finally comes into his own and incidentally wins the girl which the other hand had also attempted to secure".

== Reception ==
A review in Variety reads, "These long drawn-out melodramas are pretty tough on summer-time audiences" and "Melodramatics are the stock in trade of this production, with the story bringing forth only old bits in this line to create interest. The tale has a flimsy love angle weakly told, with the theme in general falling short of holding attention".

== Cast ==
- Dorothy Mackaill as Constance Morley
- Reed Howes as John Ellsworth
- Zena Keefe as Governess
- Warren Cook as Thomas Kitterly
- Joseph Blake as Jeremy Ellsworth
- Henry Sedley as James Gault
- Sydney Deane as Dr. Mason
- Rita Rogan as Beatrice Ellsworth
- J.H. Lewis as Jules Davega
- Gladden James as Phil Carter / Floyd Watson
- Edward Roseman as Half-Wit

== See also ==
- The Broken Violin (1928 film)
