= Silas Green from New Orleans =

African-American variety tent show

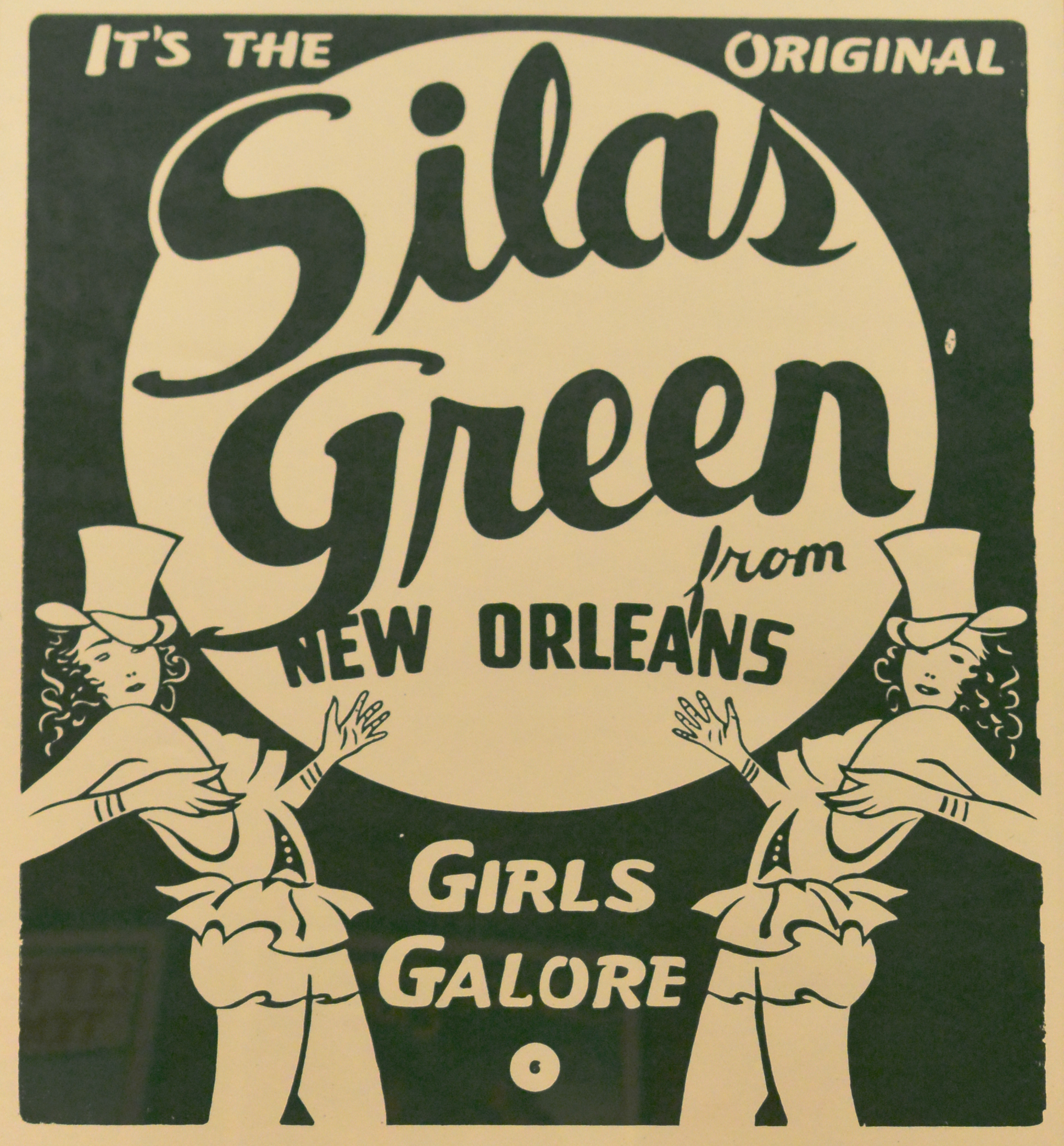
Partial poster for Silas Green from New Orleans, from a mid-1940s printing plate by Hatch Show Print.

Silas Green from New Orleans was an African-American owned and run variety tent show that, in various forms, toured the Southern States from about 1904 through 1957. Part-revue, part-musicomedy, part-minstrel show, the show told the adventures of short, "coal-black" Silas Green and tall, "tannish" Lilas Bean. There was never a Silas Green nor any notable connection to New Orleans. "Silas Green" was a fictional character created by the show's original writer, Salem Tutt Whitney.

== History ==
The show was originally conceived, scored, and written by vaudeville performer Salem Tutt Whitney. The song "Silas Green from New Orleans" debuted around 1908 in a revue by the Black Patti Troubadours, in New York. The Tutt Brothers, Whitney and J. Homer Tutt, were a comedic duo in the Troubadours show.

According to a 1941 article in the Pittsburgh Courier by Egar Theodore Rouzeau (1905–1958), the origins of the show, Silas Green from New Orleans, as produced by circus owner Prof. Eph. Williams (né Ephraim Williams; 1860–1921), was believed to have been established as an American institution by 1912, with large [racially] mixed audiences in cities throughout the South. Rouzeau qualified his statement, stating, "Records of that first peregrination of Silas Green have faded with the years, but we do know that the future of the show could not have seemed very bright to the Brothers Tutt, because they renounced all claims and turned it over, title and all, to the late Prof. Eph Williams, in lieu of services rendered as a performer."

Williams was, until his death, the only Black circus owner in America. Williams had set up his first circus in Wisconsin in 1885, and by the mid-1890s owned 100 Arabian horses and employed 26 people. His circus business collapsed around 1902, but soon afterwards he acquired the rights to Silas Green From New Orleans.

Williams set up a new company, "Prof. Eph Williams' Famous Troubadours", to tour as a tent show. His Troubadours played one-night stands throughout the South, and became one of the longest-lasting tent shows in America. Williams managed the show and continued to perform horse tricks, alongside musicians such as Bessie Smith. By 1912, he rebranded his Famous Troubadours as Silas Green from New Orleans.

When Eph Williams died in 1921, Vivian Williams Brent (1894–1942), his oldest surviving child (of three daughters) had been handling his business. Half ownership in the show went to Charles Collier (1881–1942). The show went on the following season under the direction of Richmond C. Puggsley with Lawrence Booker directing the band and Aida I. Booker as prima donna. By 1928, the troupe employed 54 people, including a 16-piece band and 16 female dancers. The main show tent had a capacity of some 1,400.

Eventually, Collier acquired sole ownership. The show continued to tour until the late 1950s, and in later years was sometimes billed simply as the Silas Green Show.

== Selected personnel ==
=== Owners and managers ===
- Hortense Collier (née Wong; 1908–2002), dancer and manager. Hortense married Charles Collier around 1932; she was Chinese-American. To avoid Jim Crow laws, members of the company lived and traveled mostly in railroad cars. Commenting on racism in 1942, Hortense stated:
  I'm beginning to believe that the prejudice of the South is far less dangerous than the so-called tolerance of the North. A Northerner will tell you that he has no prejudice whatsoever and then he will find all sorts of ways to keep you out of employment, using one excuse or another as a pretext. That makes him a hypocrite. With a prejudiced Southerner, you always know what to expect. But once his mind is emancipated, you won't find a greater liberal anywhere than [that of] a Southern White man.
- Wilmer Jones became co-owner after the death of Charles Collier, with Hortense Collier as the other co-owner.

=== Leading actors and actresses ===
- Ford Wiggins (1889–1944), a native of New Bern, North Carolina, played the lead role of Silas Green for 34 seasons – until March 10, 1944, when he died during a performance in Palm Beach, Florida. Wiggins was one of only four notable actors in that role. He jeopardized his position when, on August 28, 1924, around 5 am, he shot and killed fellow performer Henry "Slim" Gallman (aka Gorman or Gahlam or Gahlman or, on the death certificate, Goldman; 1892–1924) of Winston-Salem in the baggage compartment of a railway passenger car parked on a siding of the Southern Railway yard in Lexington over 5 cents in a card game where moonshine – during prohibition – played an important part. Gallman had been a singer in the chorus. Wiggins was arrested and charged with murder with a bond fixed at $1,000 (equivalent to $18,786 in 2025). Wiggins pleaded self-defense. Clarinetist band-member Bob Young (né Robert Young), a witness, provided testimony that corroborated with Wiggins' plea. Within a year, Wiggins was back with the show in the leading role. Young, later, directed the Silas Green band.
- Ada Lockhart (née Adeline Lockhart; 1874–1938) – stage name, Aida Booker – leading actress, started her theatrical career with Black Patti and closed it out in 1929 after fifteen years with Silas Green. On July 29, 1916, she married Lawrence Booker (né Lawrence Henry Booker; 1881–1964), the show's bandmaster, who had been touring with the show since 1912. He, with Ada, retired in 1929. They both spent some of their post-theatrical years being affiliated with Bethune–Cookman College.

=== Producer(s) ===
- Sherman H. Dudley Jr. (né Sherman Harry Dudley; 1904–1974), the son of Sherman H. Dudley, Sr. (1872–1940), was, in 1932, brought in to take Sam H. Gray's place, who died before the debut of his new production, Money Loafing. Gray, a well-known bass singer, had arrived in 1932 to replace Lonnie Fisher.

=== Dancers ===
- Margaret "Callie" Lee (née Margaret Calcinia Lee; 1924–1912), of Warrenton, Virginia – dancer. She was married to John Wilmer Bumbray (1922–2017).
- Nipsy Russell (1918–2005).
- Dorothy Marie Youmans of West Palm Beach, Florida – dancer from the late 1940s to early 1950s.

=== Musicians ===
- Lawrence Booker (né Lawrence Henry Booker; 1881–1964), band director.
- Ornette Coleman (1930–2015), tenor saxophonist, in 1949, joined the Silas Green band, marking the beginning of his professional career in performing jazz. During a tour in Mississippi, he was beaten up after playing an unconventional solo. An angry mob threw his tenor off a hillside. Coleman was kicked out of the band in Natchez, Mississippi, after only two months for trying to teach a bebop tune to another player. From Natchez, Coleman made his way to New Orleans where he switched to alto sax.
- Oliver Welock Mason (1900–1961), trumpeter and brother of (i) jazz clarinetist Norman Mason (1895–1971), (ii) jazz trumpeter Henry Morris Mason (born 1906; DOD not known), and (iii) Bahamian suffragist Mary Ingraham (1901–1982).
- Amos Gilliard (né Amos London Gilliard; 1884–1935), trombonist, who had been a member of Jim Europe's 369th Infantry "Hellfighters" Band.

=== Musicians for Eph Williams' Famous Troubadours aka Big City Minstrels ===
Eighteen piece concert band, including:

- R. H. Collins, director
- Fred Kewley (né Fred Cecil Kewley; 1889–1953), clarinet, with his wife, Elizabeth, featured singer and dancer, toured with Eph Williams from 1911 through 1914. Fred and Elizabeth divorced in 1924 and Elizabeth went on to perform on tour in a production of Kentucky Sue. Two months after his divorce, he married Exie Preston (maiden; 1897–1942). Together, they became foster parents of jazz saxophonist Ted Buckner (1913–1976). Fred was also one of Ted's saxophone teachers.
- Jessie Reeves, trombone
- R.J. Mitchell, cornet

=== Vocalists ===
- Ida Cox (1888–1967)
- Ma Rainey (1886–1939)
- Bessie Smith (1894–1937)
- J. Homer Tutt (1882–1951) and his brother, Salem Tutt Whitney (1869–1934) toured with Eph Williams from 1888 through 1905.
- Princess White (1881–1976)

=== Magician ===
- Alonzo Moore (1878–1930), a magician, was born and raised in Tipton, Missouri. He died on his fifty-second birthday, April 13, in Northwood Park, Cook County, Illinois.
1. Courtesy University of Iowa Libraries
  1. (image)
  2. (image)
  3. (image)
  4. (image)

== Critical review ==
In 1940, Time stated:

This year their troubles start when they go to a hospital with suitcases labeled M.D. (Mule Drivers), are mistaken for two medicos, end in jail. The show is garnished with such slapstick as putting a patient to sleep by letting him smell an old shoe, such gags as "Your head sets on one end of your spine and you set on the other." Silas gets broad at times, but never really dirty. What keeps it moving are its dances and specialty acts, its gold-toothed but good-looking chorus.

== Poster art ==
Historic posters advertising the shows, mostly printed by Hatch Show Print of Nashville, are popular among collectors. (Note: Two Hatch brothers, Charles Randett Hatch (1851–1921) and Herbert Hazelton Hatch (1854–1925), started the printing company C.R. & H.H. Hatch April 12, 1879. Around 1921, Charlie's son, Will T. Hatch (né William Thompson Hatch; 1886–1952), took charge and "Hatch Show Print" became one of its brands. ("Hatch Show Print Celebrates 140 Years of Letterpress Printing", April 4, 2019. Country Music Hall of Fame and Museum. Retrieved January 27, 2021).)

Three Hatch posters for Silas Green from New Orleans can be viewed in eleven photographs by Marion Post Wolcott held the Library of Congress Prints and Photographs Division. The images are part of the Farm Security Administration–Office of War Information Photograph Collection, available online through the American Memory Project. The posters are advertising a performance for October 4, 1939, in Belzoni, Mississippi. (retrieved January 27, 2021)

1. Title: "Itinerant salesman selling goods from his truck to Negroes in center of town on Saturday afternoon. Belzoni, Mississippi Delta, Mississippi."
  1. LCCN 2017-754815 (image)
  2. LCCN 2017-754816 (image)
  3. LCCN 2017-754817 (image)
  4. LCCN 2017-754818 (image)
  5. LCCN 2017-754819 (image)
2. Title: "Some of the Negroes watching [an] itinerant salesman selling goods from his truck in center of town on Saturday afternoon. Belzoni, Mississippi Delta, Mississippi".
  6. LCCN 2017-754823 (image)
  7. LCCN 2017-754831 (image)
  8. LCCN 2017-754832 (image)
  9. LCCN 2017-754833 (image)
  10. LCCN 2017-754898 (image)
  11. LCCN 2017-754899 (image)
3. LCCN slide show (35 images)

... from a collection courtesy of the University of Georgia:

12. (image)

== Bibliography ==
=== References ===
News media

- Advocate-Messenger, The (August 29, 1924). "Minstrel Here Yesterday Murdered in Lexington". Vol. 14, no. 99. Danville, Kentucky. p. 1 – via Newspapers.com.
- Gastonia Gazette (September 29, 1908). "Black Patti". Supplement. Vol. 29, no. 78. p. 5 – via Newspapers.com.
- Lexington Herald, The (August 29, 1924). "Is Held for Murder – Arrest Follows Row in Minstrel Show Car". Vol. 54, no. 241. Lexington, Kentucky. p. 12 – via Newspapers.com.
- Lexington Leader, The (August 28, 1924). "Negro Minstrel Killed Over Game – Shooting Occurs on Car in Southern Railway Yards; Man Held on Murder Charge" (final ed.). Lexington, Kentucky. p. 1 – via Newspapers.com.
- Lexington Leader, The (August 29, 1924). "Minstrel Held to Jury in Slaying – Ford Wiggins Claims Self Defense in Shooting of Fellow-Trooper; Given Examining Trial" (final ed.). Lexington, Kentucky. p. 3 – via Newspapers.com.
- Pittsburgh Courier; Rouzeau, Edgar Theodore (1905–1958) (April 19, 1941). "Greatest Negro Show on Earth!". Theatricals. Vol. 32, no. 16. p. 21 – via Newspapers.com.
- Pittsburgh Courier (March 14, 1942). "Show-Owner's Wife Airs Views on Tolerance – Says Southern Prejudice is Far Less Dangerous Than Said Northern Tolerance". Vol. 33, no. 11. p. 8 – via Newspapers.com.
- Pittsburgh Courier (September 29, 1945). "Silas Green Hits Dixie" (PDF). Vol. 36, no. 40. p. 17 – via Fultonhistory.com.
- Pittsburgh Courier; Anderson, Trezzvant W. (1906–1963) (Courier roving reporter) (August 8, 1959). "Silas Green from New Orleans Show May Be Resurrected". Vol. 51, no. 32. p. 24 – via Newspapers.com.

Books, journals, magazines, and papers

- Abbott, Lynn (born 1946); Seroff, Doug (2007). Ragged but Right: Black Traveling Shows, 'Coon Songs', and the Dark Pathway to Blues and Jazz. American Made Music Series (1st ed.). Jackson: University Press of Mississippi. p. 334. ISBN 9781604731484 – via Google Books. OCLC 793384482. LCCN 2006-15009. ISBN 978-1-6170-3645-3, 1-6170-3645-5, 978-1-6047-3148-4; and ISBN 1-6047-3148-6
- Billboard, The (December 31, 1921). "The Late Eph Williams" (PDF). J.A. Jackson's Page – in the interest of the Colored actor, actress and musician of America (re: James Albert Jackson; 1878–1960). The Billboard. Vol. 33, no. 53. p. 43.
- "Minstrel and Tent Show Talk – 'Bridget' Writes" (PDF). The Billboard. Vol. 36, no. 22. May 31, 1924. p. 47 – via americanradiohistory.com; David Frackelton Gleason (born 1946), Cleveland.
- Franklin, Benjamin V, PhD (born 1939) (2016). "Gilliard, Amos". An Encyclopedia of South Carolina Jazz and Blues Musicians. Columbia: University of South Carolina Press. ISBN 978-1-6111-7622-3. OCLC 965611335 – via Google Books.
- Hoh, LaVahn G.; Rough, William H. (1990). "Chapter 3: New World Roots – Ephraim Williams". Step Right up! The Adventure of Circus in America. Whitehall, Virginia: Betterway. pp. 68–69. Archived from the original on September 6, 2006 – via American Studies at the University of Virginia, transcript maintained by Alan Howard, Professor Emeritus, American Studies. OCLC 613269672 (all editions). ISBN 978-1-5587-0139-7, 1-5587-0139-7.
- Malone, Jacqui (1996). Steppin' on the Blues: The Visible Rhythms of African American Dance. University of Illinois Press. p. 63. ISBN 0-2520-2211-4. LCCN 95-4413. OCLC 757583016 – via Google Books.
- Oliver, Paul (2009). "Figure 3.6. Wall poster advertising the Silas Green traveling show, c. 1938". Barrelhouse Blues: Location Recording and the Early Traditions of the Blues. New York: Basic Civitas. pp. 39, 49–50. ISBN 978-0-4650-0881-0. LCCN 2009017399. OCLC 4809772610 – via Google Books (image blocked from preview citing copyright) (from the Library of Congress Collection).
- Peterson, Bernard L., Jr. (2001). "Williams (Prof.) Eph. (for Ephraim) (d. 1921)". Profiles of African American Stage Performers and Theatre People, 1816–1960. Westport, Connecticut: Greenwood Press. pp. 310–311. ISBN 9780313295348 – via Google Books. OCLC 1126462332 (all editions). LCCN 99--88056. ISBN 0-3132-9534-4.
- Sampson, Henry T. (2014). Blacks in Blackface: A Sourcebook on Early Black Musical Shows (2nd ed.). Scarecrow Press. p. 1219. ISBN 978-0-8108-8350-5. LCCN 2012012414 – via Google Books.
- Thompson, Dave (2010). Bayou Underground: Tracing the Mythical Roots of American Popular Music. Toronto: ECW Press. ISBN 978-1-5502-2962-2. OCLC 679694437 – via Google Books.
- Time (April 29, 1940). "The Theatre: Mr. Green & Mr. Bean". Time. Vol. 35, no. 18.
- UGA Today (October 3, 2011). "Traveling Exhibition Celebrates American Graphic Art Tradition" (online magazine). Campus news. UGA Today. Athens: University of Georgia.
- Walker Evans (2000). Curators: (i) Maria Morris Hambourg; (ii) Jeff L. Rosenheim; (iii) Douglas Eklund; (iv) Mia Fineman (2000). (link) (museum exhibition catalogue). Publisher: The Metropolitan Museum of Art in association with the Princeton University Press. p. 80. ISBN 9780870999383 – via Google Books (published in conjunction with the exhibition "Walker Evans" held at the Metropolitan Museum of Art, February 1 through May 14, 2000; the San Francisco Museum of Art, June 2 through September 12, 2000; The Museum of Fine Arts, Houston, December 17, 2000, through March 11, 2001) OCLC 185532906 (all editions). ISBNs ISBN 0-8709-9937-0, 978-0-8709-9937-6, 0-8709-9938-9. LCCN 99-55746. 978-0-8709-9938-3, 0-6910-5078-3, 978-0-6910-5078-2.

Government, institutional, and genealogical archives

- "Goldman, Henry | Death Certificate – Kentucky Death Records, 1911–1965]". File no. 2021, Registered no. 778 → Fayette County → Lexington → Hampton Court (near the Louisville and Nashville Railroad line) → DOD: August 28, 1924 → Informant: John Timothy Anglin (1890–1930) (coroner) → Cause of death: gunshot wound (homicide) → Place of burial or removal: Winston-Salem → Undertaker: Breckenridge Crittenden (1883–1947) → Transit permit no. 681. Frankfort: Kentucky Cabinet for Health and Family Services, Office of Vital Statistics. August 28, 1924 – via FamilySearch. FHL (GS) microfilm no. 1,912,791; digital folder no. 4,222,820; online image no. 425 (of 3,321); indexing project (batch) no. 48 (of 56); record no. 417.
- "Moore, Alonzo | Death Certificate – Illinois Deaths and Stillbirths, 1916–1947]". Place of death: Northwood Park, Cook County, Illinois → DOD: April 13, 1930 → Birthplace: Tipton, Missouri → Occupation → magician. Springfield: Public Board of Health. Archives. April 13, 1930 – via FamilySearch. FHL (GS) microfilm no. 1,643,661; digital folder no. 4,008,257; online image no. 2304; reference ID 12484.
- "Moore, Alonzo | Draft Registration – United States World War I Draft Registration Cards, 1917–1918]". Moore's residence → Main Street, Tipton, Moniteau, Missouri → DOB: April 13, 1878 → Birthplace: Tipton, Missouri → Occupation → magician, Harvey's Minstrels → place of registration: Local Board for the County of Dallas, Iowa. Springfield. September 12, 1918 – via FamilySearch. FHL (GS) microfilm no. 1,642,995; digital folder no. 5,248,868; online image no. 1989 (of 4158) → citing NARA microfilm publication M1509; Washington, D.C.
- 1940 United States Census (May 20, 1940). "Mason, Oliver W.". Age: abt. 40 → place of birth: Bahamas → residence: Georgia → Chatham County → Savannah, Tract 7 → 25–8 Militia Districts 13–17 → Enumeration district 25-8 → sheet 24-B → household ID 11 → online image-page no. 48 (of 56) → line 69. Records of the U.S. Census Bureau, record group 29. Washington, D.C.: National Archives and Records Administration – via FamilySearch. NARA publication no. T627; digital folder no. 5460974; microfilm image no. 310.
- Poster (1936). "Silas Green Show – Wednesday, October 30, 1935" (gelatin silver print – B&W – of a Silas Green wheatpaste bill poster on brick). LACMA – Los Angeles County Museum of Art. (same poster, different photo courtesy of the Alabama Department of Archives and History; OCLC 885698045).
