= The Broken Violin (1928 film) =

American 1928 silent film

- Directed by: Oscar Micheaux
- Release date: 1928
- Country: United States
- Language: English

The Broken Violin is an American silent film directed by Oscar Micheaux, released in 1928.

The film is based on Micheaux's unpublished novel, House of Mystery. It is about a beautiful African-American prodigy who plays violin. She overcomes her impoverished background and alcoholic father (who breaks her violin), in order to find success in music and love.

== Cast ==
J. Homer Tutt, one of the Tutt Brothers, and Oscar Micheaux's wife Alice B. Russell starred in the film. Tutt, an accomplished vaudeville performer and producer with his brother, also had a lead role in Micheaux's films Birthright; these were his only known feature film roles. Tutt also appeared in short 1929 musical film Jailhouse Blues.

Birthright was Russell's first film, and she starred in a dozen more.

- J. Homer Tutt
- Ardell Dabney
- Alice B. Russell
- Ike Paul
- Daisy Foster
- Gertrude Snelson
- Boots Hope
- Ehtel Smith
- W. Hill
- William A. Clayton, Jr.

== See also ==
- The Broken Violin (1923 film)
