= The Exile (1931 film) =

1931 film

- Poster
- Directed by: Oscar Micheaux
- Screenplay by: Oscar Micheaux
- Based on: The Conquest; 1931 novel by Oscar Micheaux
- Produced by: Oscar Micheaux; Frank Schiffman
- Starring: Eunice Brooks; Stanley Morrell; Celeste Cole
- Cinematography: Lester Lang; Walter Strenge
- Music by: Donald Heywood
- Color process: Black-and-white
- Production company: Micheaux Film
- Distributed by: Micheaux Film
- Release date: May 16, 1931
- Running time: 93 minutes
- Country: United States
- Language: English

The Exile is a 1931 American pre-Code film directed by Oscar Micheaux with choreography by Leonard Harper. A drama-romance of the race film genre, The Exile was Micheaux's first feature-length sound film, and the first African-American sound film. Adapted from Micheaux's first novel The Conquest (1913), it the film shares some autobiographical elements; for example, Micheaux spent several years as a cattle rancher in an otherwise all-white area of South Dakota as does the film's central character Jean Baptiste (played by Stanley Morrell).

== Plot ==
The film.

In Chicago, Edith Duval has become powerful in the African-American community, mostly because she came into possession of a South Chicago mansion where she was once a servant; the white family that owned the mansion abandoned it when blacks started moving into the neighborhood. She is in love with Jean Baptiste, but she rejects his idealism and he is at odds with her cynicism. Edith wants to convert the mansion into a speakeasy and nightclub.

Baptiste buys land in South Dakota and becomes a successful rancher. Five years into his time there, he falls in love with young Agnes Stewart. He considers the situation hopeless because Agnes is white and although she accepts him, he feels as though they won't work together as a couple. After he leaves the area, Agnes's father reveals to her that her late mother, who is deceased, was of Ethiopian ancestry and thus, Agnes is part black.

Fleeing back to Chicago to escape the relationship, which he believes is doomed, the former teetotaler Baptiste returns to Edith's club, her liquor and her charms. They plan to marry, but her former lover, an Ethiopian named Jango, appears, sneaks into Edith's room and complains of how she has ruined him. After he threatens suicide, she hands him a gun as a gesture of contempt. Instead of killing himself, he kills her. Baptiste is initially suspected of the murder but is cleared when a witness comes forward and confirms overhearing Jango and Edith arguing.

Back in South Dakota, Agnes reads in the newspaper on Baptiste being accused of murder and goes out of her way to Chicago to help him. She arrives at City Hall just as he is cleared by the district attorney. After being reunited, they return to South Dakota.

== Cast ==
- Eunice Brooks as Edith Duval
- Stanley Morrell as Jean Baptiste
- Celeste Cole as Singer
- Nora Newsome as Agnes Stewart
- Carl Mahon as Jango
- Kathleen Noisette as Madge
- Charles R. Moore as Jack Stewart
- George Randol as Bill Prescott
- A.B. DeComathiere as An Outlaw
- Lou Vernon as District Attorney
- Louise Cook as Dancer
- Roland Holder as Tap Dancer
- Donald Heywood as Bandleader

== Production ==
The film was shot at Metropolitan Studios in Fort Lee, New Jersey, where many early film studios were based at the beginning of the 20th century. Filming was scheduled to accommodate the many cast members who had commitments on Broadway. Principal photography wrapped in late February 1931 and post-production was completed in March. A preview screening was successful and the film premiered at the Lafayette Theater in May to sold-out crowds and positive reviews.

== Reception ==
In 2008, film historian Richard Koszarski wrote: "Although some critics later described The Exile 'a disaster,' its technical quality is certainly no worse than Mother’s Boy (1929) and Howdy Broadway (1929), or other low-budget eastern productions of the period. Indeed, Micheaux’s sober analysis of racial distinction with and without the black community marks The Exile as far more ambitious and interesting than most other independent films of the day. The Exile was a highly personal statement that Micheaux dramatized as stock melodrama, a very difficult project to pull off in the 1930s. If the film was the critical and commercial failure some historians suggest, then its fate may be seen as prefiguring the negative response to D. W. Griffith’s The Struggle (1931), shot in the Bronx a few months later."
