= A. B. DeComathiere =

A. B. DeComathiere (19 November 1877 - 18 May 1940) was an actor in the United States. He had a leading role in The Brute (1920). He also starred in the race film The Black King (1932), a satire of Marcus Garvey and his followers.

He was born in New York. He was Connie in the Vaudeville team Sloe and Connie.

== Filmography ==
- The Brute (1920) as "Bull" Magee
- The Hypocrite (1922)
- Deceit (1923 film) (1923) as Reverend Bently
- The Midnight Ace (1928)
- The Exile (1931)
- The Black King (1932)
- Ten Minutes to Live (1932) as Anthony

== Theater ==
- An African Prince (1920)
- Dumb Luck (1922)
- Goat Alley (1927)
- Porgy (play) as Simon Frazier, a lawyer
- The Second Coming (1931)
- Ol' Man Satan (1932) as Satan
- Ragtime (1933)
