= Blanche Thompson =

Piano teacher, sportswoman, social reformer

Blanche Edith Thompson (née Lough; 18 March 1874 – 19 January 1963) was a notable New Zealand piano teacher, sportswoman and social reformer. She was born in Brown's Bridge, North Canterbury, New Zealand in 1874. She participated in cycling, then swimming, and later croquet. In 1905, she may have been the first New Zealand woman to have won a driving competition.
