= Dixiana (film) =

1930 film directed by Luther Reed

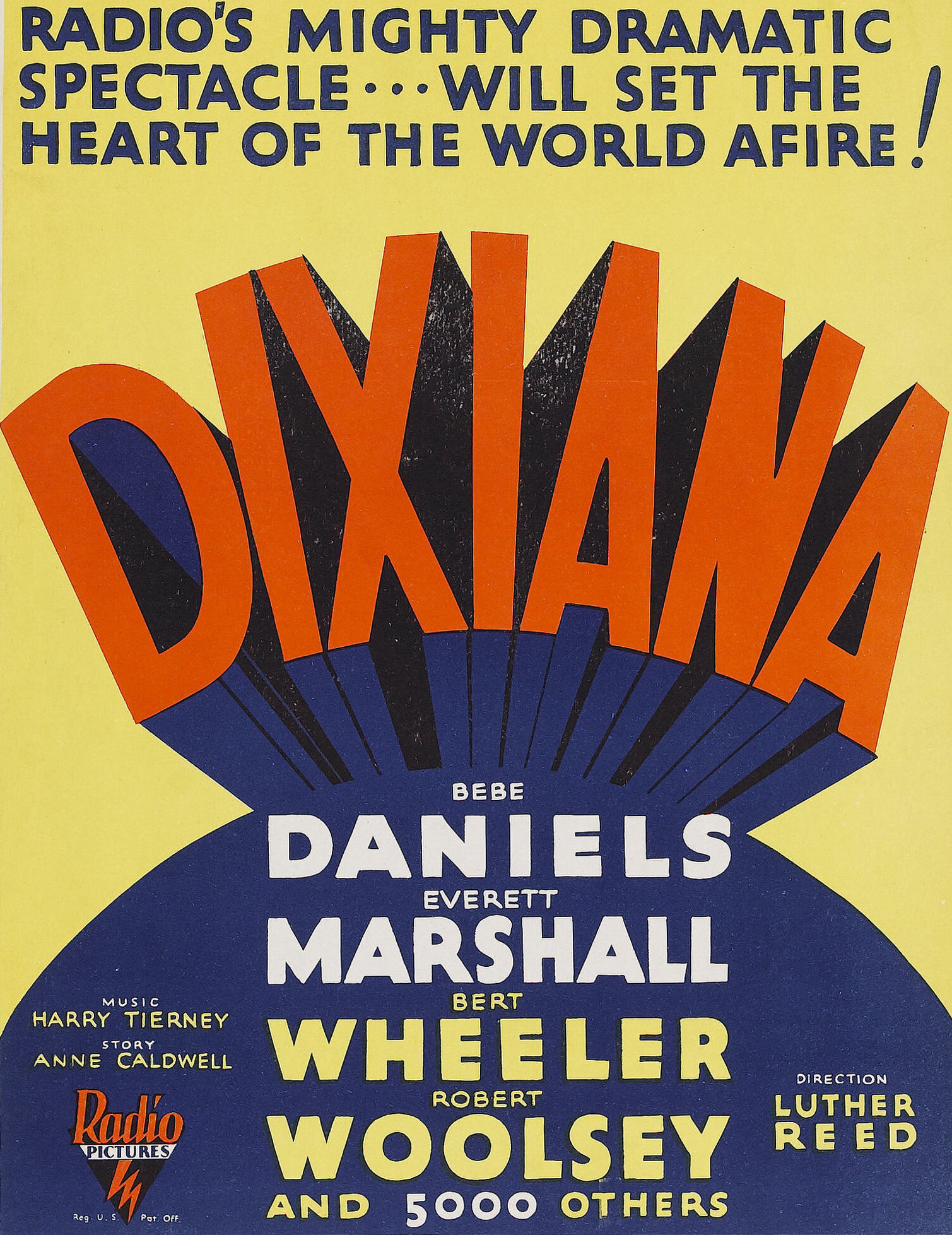
- Theatrical release poster
- Directed by: Luther Reed; Fred Fleck (assistant)
- Written by: Anne Caldwell (story); Luther Reed (script)
- Starring: Bebe Daniels; Everett Marshall; Wheeler & Woolsey; Joseph Cawthorn; Jobyna Howland; Ralf Harolde; Bill "Bojangles" Robinson; Dorothy Lee
- Cinematography: J. Roy Hunt
- Music by: Harry Tierney (composer); Victor Baravalle (direction); Max Steiner (orchestration)
- Production company: RKO Radio Pictures
- Distributed by: RKO Radio Pictures
- Release date: August 1, 1930
- Running time: 100 minutes
- Country: United States
- Language: English
- Budget: $747,000
- Box office: $780,000

Dixiana (1930)

Dixiana is a 1930 American pre-Code musical film directed by Luther Reed and produced and distributed by RKO Radio Pictures. The final twenty minutes of the picture were photographed in Technicolor. The film stars Bebe Daniels, Everett Marshall, Bert Wheeler, Robert Woolsey, Joseph Cawthorn, Jobyna Howland, Ralf Harolde, Bill "Bojangles" Robinson (in his film debut) and Dorothy Lee. The script was adapted by Luther Reed from a story by Anne Caldwell.

This is the film in which composer Max Steiner received his first screen credit for orchestration. Additionally, it was Wheeler & Woolsey's third film; however, as they were not yet an official "team," they were still billed separately.

== Plot ==
Dixiana Caldwell and her friends, Peewee and Ginger, are circus performers in the antebellum Southern United States. When Dixiana falls in love with a young Southern aristocrat, Carl Van Horn, she leaves the circus where she is employed and, with Peewee and Ginger, accompanies Carl to his family's plantation in order to meet Van Horn's family. At first thrilled with the news of their impending nuptials, Carl's father and stepmother, Cornelius and Birdie Van Horn, throw a lavish party for the couple. However, Peewee and Ginger inadvertently disclose Dixiana's background as a circus performer, creating a scandal for the elder Van Horns.

Asked by the stepmother to leave in disgrace, Dixiana and her friends return to New Orleans, seeking to gain re-employment from her former employer at the Cayetano Circus Theatre, but they are regretfully refused by him because of the way she had departed. Desperate, she takes employment at a local gambling hall, run by Royal Montague, who also has personal designs on Dixiana. As part of his plan, he intends to financially ruin Carl and his family and use Dixiana to accomplish that purpose.

Things come to a head when Dixiana is crowned queen of the Mardi Gras. When Montague absconds with her, Carl challenges him to a duel, but, when a disguised Dixiana shows up in his stead, she tricks Montague into revealing his nefarious plans. Carl and Dixiana are reunited.

== Cast ==
- Bebe Daniels as Dixiana Caldwell
- Everett Marshall as Carl Van Horn
- Bert Wheeler as Peewee
- Robert Woolsey as Ginger Dandy
- Joseph Cawthorn as Cornelius Van Horn
- Jobyna Howland as Birdie Van Horn
- Dorothy Lee as Poppy
- Ralf Harolde as Royal Montague
- Edward Chandler as Blondell
- George Herman as Contortionist
- Raymond Maurel as Cayetano
- Bruce Covington as Company porter
- Bill Robinson as 'Bojangles' – Tap Dancer
- Eugene Jackson as Cupid

(Cast list as per AFI database)

- Additional uncredited parts were performed by husband and wife Sydney Kirkpatrick and Laura Bowman.

== Production ==
RKO spent $100,000 to obtain period accurate furniture for the plantation set.

== Copyright status ==
At the end of 1958, the film entered the public domain in the United States because RKO did not renew its copyright registration in the 28th year after publication.

== Preservation status ==
The Technicolor sequences were considered lost for years but were re-discovered in 1988 and subsequently included in the restored DVD.

== Reception ==
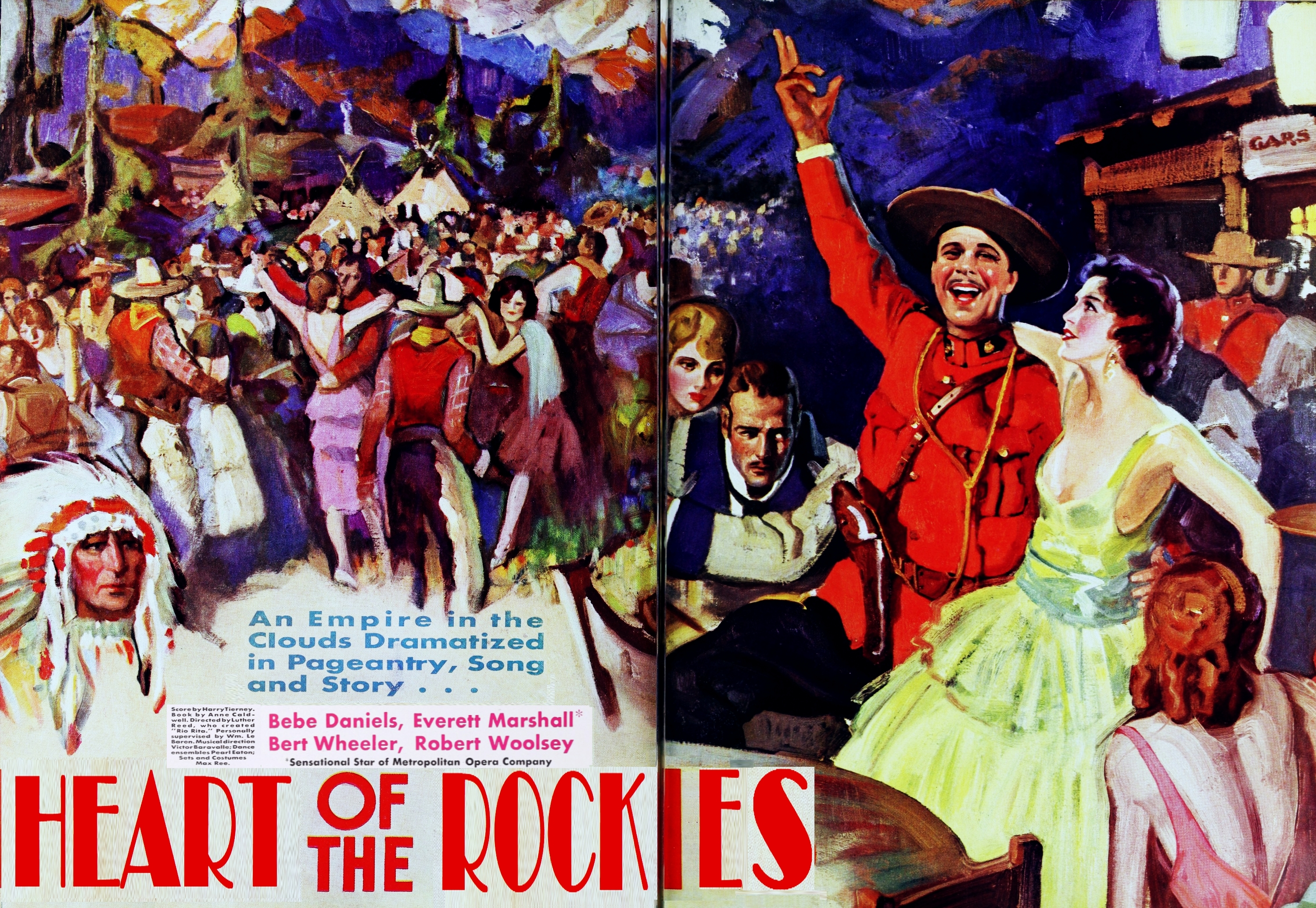
Radio Pictures announcement for musical of Heart Of The Rockies (1930) which was never realized.

During early previews, in May 1930, Dixiana received very good reviews from audiences. Based on this information, Radio Pictures immediately planned another musical to follow on the assumption that Dixiana would prove to be as great a hit as Rio Rita. This third musical would star Bebe Daniels, Everett Marshall and feature the comedy team of Wheeler & Woolsey. The film was to be called Heart of the Rockies and was to be filmed either partly or entirely in Technicolor. Filming was scheduled to begin in September 1930 in Banff, Canada. By the time Dixiana was released, however, the public had grown sour on musicals and based on the lackluster response to Dixiana these lavish plans were quietly dropped.

Reviewer Mordaunt Hall of The New York Times wrote of the singing, "...one wishes there was more of it and less of the somewhat futile attempt at a story" and noted that Bill Robinson "...gives an excellent exhibition of tap dancing, which won a genuine round of applause" and concluded, "The early glimpses of the circus theatre ... lead one to expect more than one is apt to get out of this production."

The film reunited the director and most of the cast of RKO's most successful film of the year before, Rio Rita, but lackluster performances and direction, as well as a glut of movie musicals led to the film being one of RKO's biggest disappointments of 1930. The film lost an estimated $300,000.

== See also ==
- List of early color feature films

== Works cited ==
- Campbell, Edward (1981). The Celluloid South: Hollywood and the Southern Myth. University of Tennessee Press. ISBN 0870493272.
