= Sidney Kirkpatrick =

Sidney Kirkpatrick may refer to:

- Sidney Kirkpatrick (1881–1930), another name spelling used for the African American actor and singer Sydney Kirkpatrick
- Sidney D. Kirkpatrick (1955–2025), American documentary filmmaker and author
