= The Iron Claw (1941 serial) =

1941 film by James W. Horne

- Theatrical release poster
- Directed by: James W. Horne; Carl Hiecke (asst.)
- Written by: Basil Dickey; George H. Plympton; Jesse Duffy; Charles R. Condon; Jack Stanley; Arthur John Arbuthnott Stringer
- Produced by: Larry Darmour
- Starring: Charles Quigley; Joyce Bryant; Walter Sande; Forrest Taylor
- Cinematography: James S. Brown Jr.
- Edited by: Dwight Caldwell; Earl Turner
- Music by: Lee Zahler
- Distributed by: Columbia Pictures
- Release date: August 15, 1941
- Running time: 15 episodes 289 minutes
- Country: United States
- Language: English

The Iron Claw (1941) was the 15th serial released by Columbia Pictures .

== Plot ==
A fortune in gold, taken from the wreck of a Spanish galleon, is hidden in the home of Anton Benson, a reclusive miser. The entire Benson family and household want the gold for themselves, including a mystery villain known as the Iron Claw. Newspaper journalist Bob Lane, with his photographer Jack Strong and Benton's niece Patricia, attempt to get to the bottom of the mystery.

== Cast ==
Actor	Role
Charles Quigley	Bob Lane
Joyce Bryant	Patricia Benson
Walter Sande	Jack Strong
Forrest Taylor	Anton Benson
Norman Willis	Roy Benson, Landong's partner in crime
Alex Callam	Dr. James Benson/The Iron Claw
James Metcalfe	Culver Benson
Allen Doone	Simon Leach
Edythe Elliott	Milly Leach
John Beck	Gyves, the butler
Charles King	Silk Langdon, Chief henchman
James C. Morton	Detective Casey
Hal Price	O'Malley

== Chapter titles ==
1. The Shaft of Doom
2. The Murderous Mirror
3. The Drop of Destiny
4. The Fatal Fuse
5. The Fiery Fall
6. The Ship Log Talks
7. The Mystic Map
8. The Perilous Pit
9. The Cul-de-sac
10. The Curse of the Cave
11. The Doctor's Bargain
12. Vapors of Evil
13. The Secret Door
14. The Evil Eye
15. The Claw's Collapse

_{Source:}
