= Everett Marshall (singer) =

American singer and actor (1901–1965)

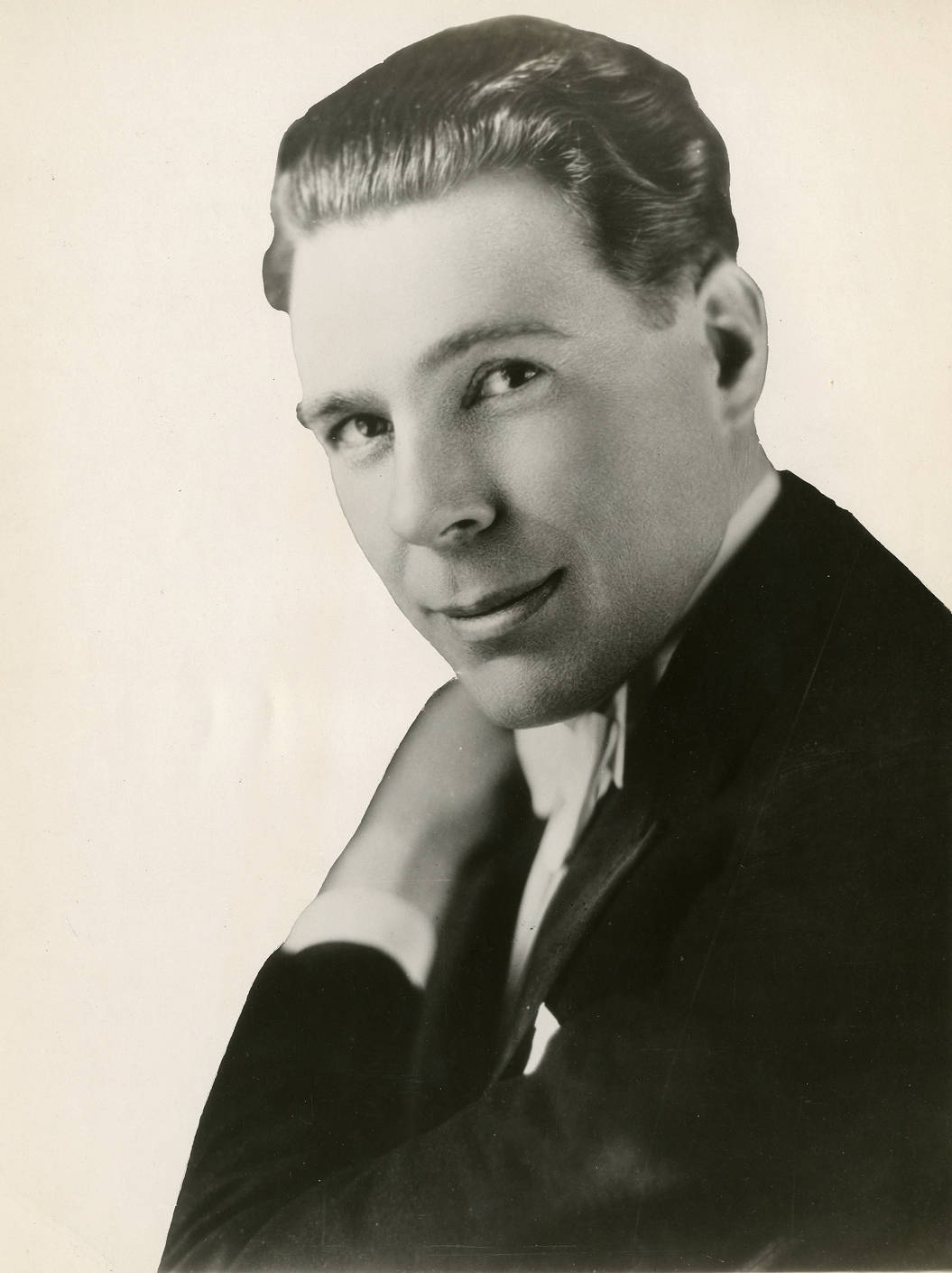
- Born: December 31, 1901; Lawrence, Massachusetts, U.S.
- Died: April 3, 1965 (aged 63); Carmel, California, U.S.
- Occupations: Singer; actor
- Years active: 1926–1943

Everett Marshall (December 31, 1901 – April 3, 1965) was an American singer and actor who performed at the Metropolitan Opera, in Broadway revues, and in early musical films.

== Career ==
Born in Lawrence, Massachusetts, Marshall sang as a baritone with the Metropolitan Opera from 1927 to 1931. He moved into lighter musical productions, appearing in George White's Scandals (1931), Melody (1933), Ziegfeld Follies (1934), and Calling All Stars (1934). Three of the songs that he debuted in these shows became standards that were later recorded by many artists: "The Thrill Is Gone" (with Rudy Vallée, September 14, 1931), "Wagon Wheels" (January 4, 1934), and "What Is There to Say?" (with Jane Froman, January 4, 1934).

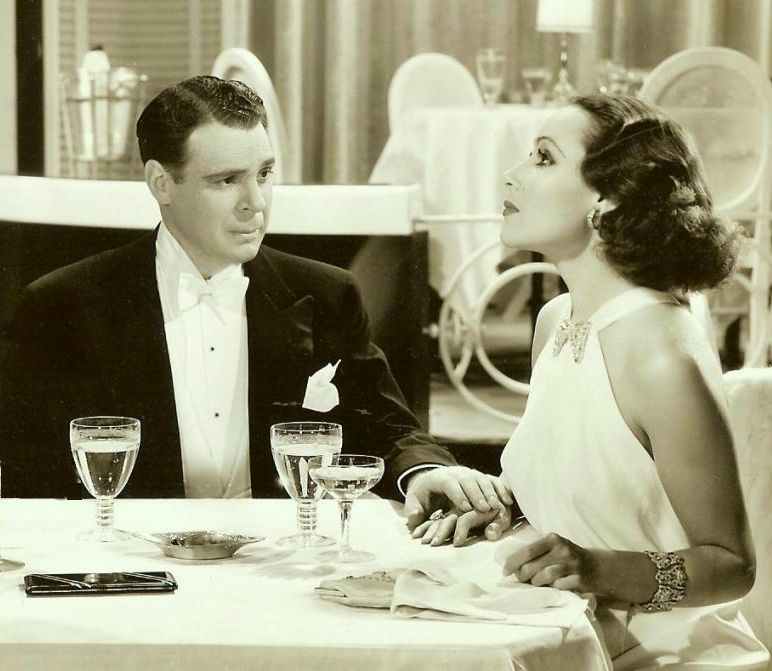
Marshall with Dolores del Río in I Live for Love, 1935

He acted and sang in several films, including 1930's Dixiana as leading man Carl Van Horn, and 1935's I Live for Love as Roger Kerry. Throughout the 1940s he performed with touring companies of vintage operettas such as Blossom Time and The Student Prince, sometimes paired with Ann Pennington.

Marshall died in Carmel, California in 1965, age 63.

== Filmography ==
Year	Title	Role	Notes
1930	Dixiana	Carl Van Horn	
1935	I Live for Love	Roger Kerry	
