= Laura Bowman =

American actress (1881–1957)

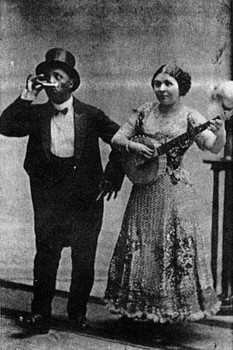
- Laura Bowman and her second husband, Pete Hampton
- Born: Laura Bradford; October 3, 1881; Quincy, Illinois, United States
- Died: 29 March 1957 (aged 75); Los Angeles, California, U.S.
- Occupations: Actress; musician; dancer
- Spouses: Henry Ward Bowman (divorced); Pete Hampton (m. 1904; died 1916); Sydney Kirkpatrick (m. 1917; died 1930); Leroi Anderson (m. 1935–1957)

Laura Bowman (born Laura Bradford, October 3, 1881 – March 29, 1957) was an American actress, musician, and dancer. Born in Quincy, Illinois, and raised in Cincinnati, Ohio, she began her career as a singer and dancer in the Williams and Walker Co. in 1902. With that organization she performed in the chorus of the landmark Broadway musical In Dahomey (1903), and later performed the role of Cecilia Lightfoot in the UK production of that musical in 1904 opposite her second husband Pete Hampton as Cicero Lightfoot. With Hampton she performed and recorded as a singer and banjoist. They worked together in their act Darktown Entertainer which toured predominantly in Europe from 1903 through 1914. They also toured in the United States and Russia.

After Pete Hampton's death in 1916, Bowman became a celebrated dramatic actress with the Lafayette Players during the age of the Harlem Renaissance. In her first production with that group, Eugene Walter's The Wolf (1916), she met the actor Sydney Kirkpatrick who became her third husband and frequent performing partner. They worked together on Broadway and in regional theatre as dramatic actors, and as musicians in vaudeville and in nightclub performances. After Kirkpatrick's death in 1932, Bowman struggled with alcoholism until stabilizing following her final marriage to the opera singer Leroi Anderson in 1935. In her later career she made several films, many with director Oscar Micheaux, while simultaneously working in radio and on the stage. She was also active as a drama teacher. Her career ceased in 1950 after she suffered a stroke which left her partially paralyzed.

== Early life and career ==
Laura Bradford was born on October 3, 1881, in Quincy, Illinois, United States. Her mother was of Dutch birth and her father was multiracial. She grew up in Cincinnati, Ohio, where her talents as a musician and actress were first explored and developed through her experiences at the family's church. At the age of 16 she married her first husband, Henry Ward Bowman, a marriage which ended soon after.

Bowman began her career as a singer and dancer. In 1902 she was hired by the Williams and Walker Co. with whom she performed in the chorus of the Broadway musical In Dahomey (1903), considered a landmark production in the American musical theatre canon. Performed at the New York Theatre, this show's cast included the actor Pete Hampton who portrayed Cicero Lightfoot. Bowman and Hampton formed a romantic attachment during the running of this show and subsequently married. Pete was a talented instrumentalist and baritone vocalist who taught Laura to play the banjo and helped her develop her soprano singing voice. Their marriage was a happy one and lasted until Pete's death in 1916.

Laura and Pete were both in the London production of In Dahomey in 1903, with Laura ultimately moving into the main cast as Cecilia Lightfoot in 1904. After this show closed they developed a musical act, Darktown Entertainer, which included them performing everything from grand opera, to popular music, to lullabies. They performed the Darktown Entertainer act internationally in the 1900s, touring Europe, Russia, and North America. They were predominantly in Europe from 1903–1914, and returned to the United States shortly before the outbreak of World War I. While in England they made phonograph records as early as 1904.

== Mid-career and marriage to Sydney Kirkpatrick ==
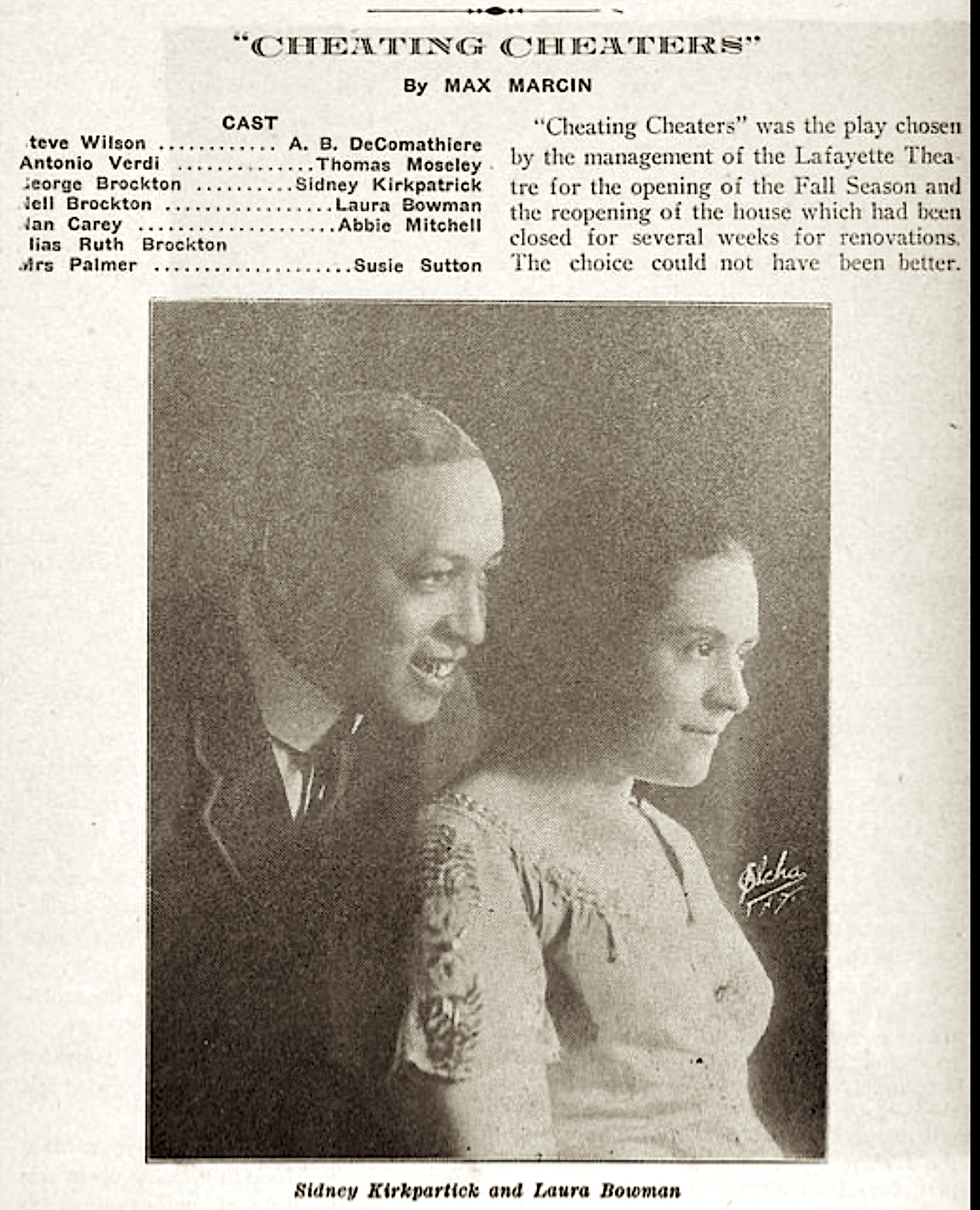
Sydney Kirkpatrick and Laura Bowman in the Lafayette Players production of Cheating Cheaters (1918).

Shortly after her second husband Pete's death, Bowman became a member of the Lafayette Players (LP) in March 1916. Her first play with this organization was Eugene Walter's The Wolf, and on her first day of rehearsal for this production she met the actor Sydney Kirkpatrick (real name Sydney Kirk) with whom she developed a rapid romance, which quickly led to a third marriage for Bowman. They married in 1917 and that same year purchased a home in Indianapolis where Kirkpatrick grew up and had family. Bowman maintained an on and off relationship with the LP which lasted many years, and with this group became a respected dramatic actress. Both she and her husband Sydney were considered some of the best-known performers with the LP during its history. Some of the plays she was celebrated in with this company included The Conspiracy, Cheating Cheaters (as Nell Brockton), and The Price.

Like her relationship with Pete, Bowman developed a performing partnership with Kirkpatrick which included a vaudeville act in which they toured under the billing the Hawaiian Duet. They also performed together in nightclubs, including the famed Café de Champion, Chicago, a nightclub catering to black audiences. In 1922 she and her husband starred in the shows That Get's It and Shades of Harlem at the Grand Theatre in Chicago. In 1923 they became members of the Ethiopian Art Players (EAP). With the EAP Bowman starred as Aunt Nancy in The Chip Woman's Fortune and Herodias in Oscar Wilde's Salome which were staged in a double bill at the Frazee Theatre in May 1923. Kirkpatrick appeared opposite her in these shows in the roles of Silas and Herod. They also performed together in the 1923 Broadway revival of Shakespeare's The Comedy of Errors (as Emilia and Aegeon), and in the 1928 Broadway production of Frank Wilson's Meek Mose (as Josephine and Enos Green). In 1925 they toured with the Andrew Bishop Players in the show Paid In Full.

Alone, Bowman appeared on Broadway as Mallie in the 1931–1932 production of Lula Vollmer's Sentinels at the Biltmore Theatre, and as Miriam in the 1932 production of Richard Maibaum's The Tree at the Park Lane Theatre. She also starred in one silent film, Oscar Micheaux's The Brute (1920), based on the life of boxer Jack Johnson. In 1928 she founded the National Arts School where she taught drama to aspiring actors. One of her pupils was future Hollywood director and film executive Wendell James Franklin. In 1929 she co-founded the Negro Art Theatre with minister Adam Clayton Powell Jr. at the Abyssinian Baptist Church in Harlem. The organization's first production, Wade in the Water, was about racial injustice in the Southern United States.

== Later life and career ==
In her later career Bowman maintained a busy schedule that encompassed simultaneous work as a drama educator, and actress in theatre, film, and radio. In 1930 her husband Sydney Kirkpatrick died of a heart attack, and subsequently in grief she began to struggle with alcoholism. Her life improved after marrying her fourth husband, Leroi Anderson, in 1935. Anderson was an opera singer who was 23 years younger than her. This marriage lasted until her death.

In the midst of her struggles in the early to mid 1930s, Bowman made a number of sound films, once again with Micheaux as director. These included Veiled Aristocrats (1932), Ten Minutes to Live (1932), and Murder in Harlem (1935). She also appeared in the quasi-horror film Drums O' Voodoo (1934) directed by Arthur Hoerl (1934), and later portrayed Dr. Helen Jackson in the Son of Ingagi (1940), the first sound horror film to feature an all-black cast. She appeared as Aunt Carrie in Micheaux's 1938 film God's Step Children, one of several films by that director whose plot involved the issue of black women passing as white. Her final films made with Micheaux were Birthright (1939) and The Notorious Elinor Lee (1940), the latter of which was another boxing film which was inspired by Joe Louis. She later had a minor role in the film Miss Susie Slagle's (1946).

In the 1930s Bowman performed on the radio programs The New Penny Show, Stella Dallas, and Pretty Kitty Kelly, and remained active as a radio performer into 1950 on programs like Amos 'n' Andy. She continued to perform as a stage actress throughout her career. Her later Broadway credits included J. Augustus Smith's Louisiana (1933, as Aunt Hagar) at the 48th Street Theatre; Owen Davis's Jezebel (1933, as Mammy Winnie) at the Ethel Barrymore Theatre; Henry Rosendahl's Yesterday's Orchids (1934, as Caroline) at the Fulton Theatre; Sophie Treadwell's Plumes in the Dust (1936, as Miranda) at the 46th Street Theatre; Mary Eunice McCarthy's Please, Mrs. Garibaldi (1939, as Endora) at the Belmont Theatre; Robert Ardrey's Jeb (1946, as Amanda Turner) at the Martin Beck Theatre; and Philip Yordan's Anna Lucasta (1947, as Theresa) at the National Theatre. She also performed in the latter play in Los Angeles in 1947, and on national tour.

In her later life Bowman lived in the Sugar Hill neighborhood in West Adams Heights, Los Angeles, with her husband Leroi. She continued to work until suffering a stroke in the summer of 1950, an event which left her partially paralyzed. She died in Los Angeles on March 29, 1957, at the age of 75. After her death, Anderson wrote a biography, Achievement: The Life of Laura Bowman, which was published by Pageant Press in 1961.

== Filmography ==
Year	Title	Role	Director	Co-star(s)	References
1920	The Brute	Mrs. Carrison	Oscar Micheaux	Evelyn Preer	
1932	Veiled Aristocrats	Molly Walden	Oscar Micheaux	Lorenzo Tucker; Lawrence Chenault	
1932	Ten Minutes to Live	Ida Morton	Oscar Micheaux	Willor Lee Guilford; Tressie Mitchell; Charlotte Evans	
1934	Drums O' Voodoo	Auntie Hagar	Arthur Hoerl	Augustus Smith	
1935	Murder in Harlem	Mrs. Epps	Oscar Micheaux	Clarence Brooks	
1938	God's Step Children	Aunt Carrie	Oscar Micheaux	Carmen Newsome	
1939	Birthright		Oscar Micheaux		
1940	The Notorious Elinor Lee	Benny's mother	Oscar Micheaux	Gladys Williams; Robert Earl Jones; Edna Mae Harris	
1940	Son of Ingagi	Dr. Helen Jackson	Richard Kahn	Zack Williams	
1946	Miss Susie Slagle's	Woman (uncredited)	John Berry	Veronica Lake; Sonny Tufts; Lillian Gish	
