= Drums O' Voodoo =

- Directed by: Arthur Hoerl
- Screenplay by: J. Augustus Smith
- Starring: Laura Bowman
- Distributed by: Sack Amusement Enterprises
- Release date: 1934

Drums O' Voodoo (also known as Louisiana and She Devil) is a 1934 film about voodoo. The film was written by J. Augustus Smith, based on his 1933 play Louisiana, and was directed by Arthur Hoerl.

== Cast ==
This is the cast of characters as listed in the title sequence of the film.

- Laura Bowman as Aunt Hagar
- Edna Barr as Myrtle Simpson
- Lionel Monagas as Ebenezer
- J. Augustus Smith as Amos Berry
- Morris McKenney as Thomas Catt
- A. B. Comathiere as Deacon Dunson
- Alberta Perkins as Sister Knight
- Fred Bonny as Brother Zero
- Paul Johnson as Brother August
- Trixie Smith Smith as Sister Marguerite
- Carrie Huff as Sister Zuran
