= The Wilderness Woman =

1926 film

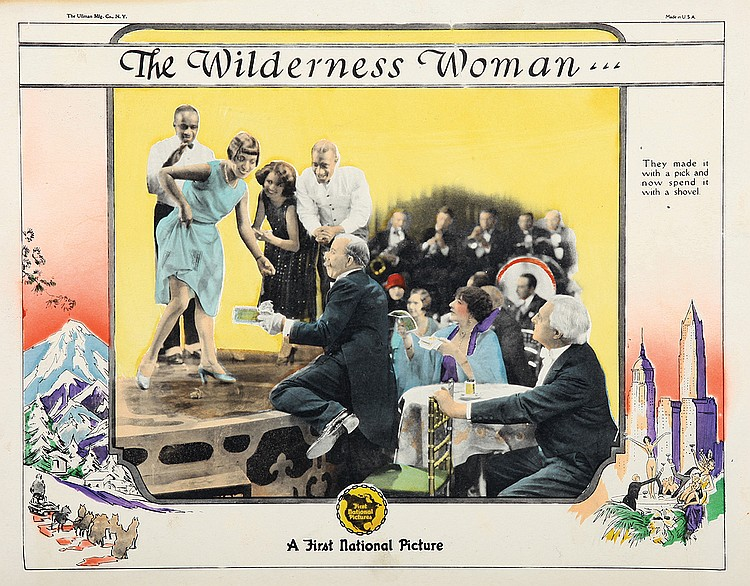
- Lobby card
- Directed by: Howard Higgin
- Written by: Arthur Stringer; Don Bartlett (titles)
- Based on: a story by Arthur Stringer
- Produced by: Robert Kane
- Starring: Aileen Pringle; Lowell Sherman
- Cinematography: Ernest Haller
- Edited by: Paul F. Maschke
- Distributed by: First National Pictures
- Release date: May 16, 1926
- Running time: 80 minutes
- Country: United States
- Language: Silent (English intertitles)

The Wilderness Woman is a 1926 American silent romantic comedy film directed by Howard Higgin. It starred Aileen Pringle and Lowell Sherman. First National Pictures produced and distributed.

== Plot ==
As described in a film magazine, Alaskan miner 'Kodiak' MacLean, having amassed a fortune but still a rube, arrives at the Hotel Biltmore in New York City with his daughter Juneau and her pet bear. Two confidence men work to take advantage of his ignorance and separate Kodiak from his wealth through a series of schemes, including trying to sell him the last subway station still available. Junie's bear causes a scene when it gets loose in the hotel, and she becomes friendly with one of the confidence men until it turns to hatred after he attacks her. Later, her affections turn to a man more worthy, Alan Burkett.

== Cast ==
- Aileen Pringle as Juneau MacLean
- Lowell Sherman as Alan Burkett
- Chester Conklin as 'Kodiak' MacLean
- Henry Vibart as The Colonel
- Robert Cainas as The Colonel's Henchman
- Harriet Sterling as Squaw
- Burr McIntosh as The Judge

== Production ==
The Wilderness Woman's exteriors were shot on location at Saranac Lake, New York.

== Preservation ==
With no prints of The Wilderness Woman located in any film archives, it is a lost film.
