= Arthur Stringer (writer) =

Canadian writer

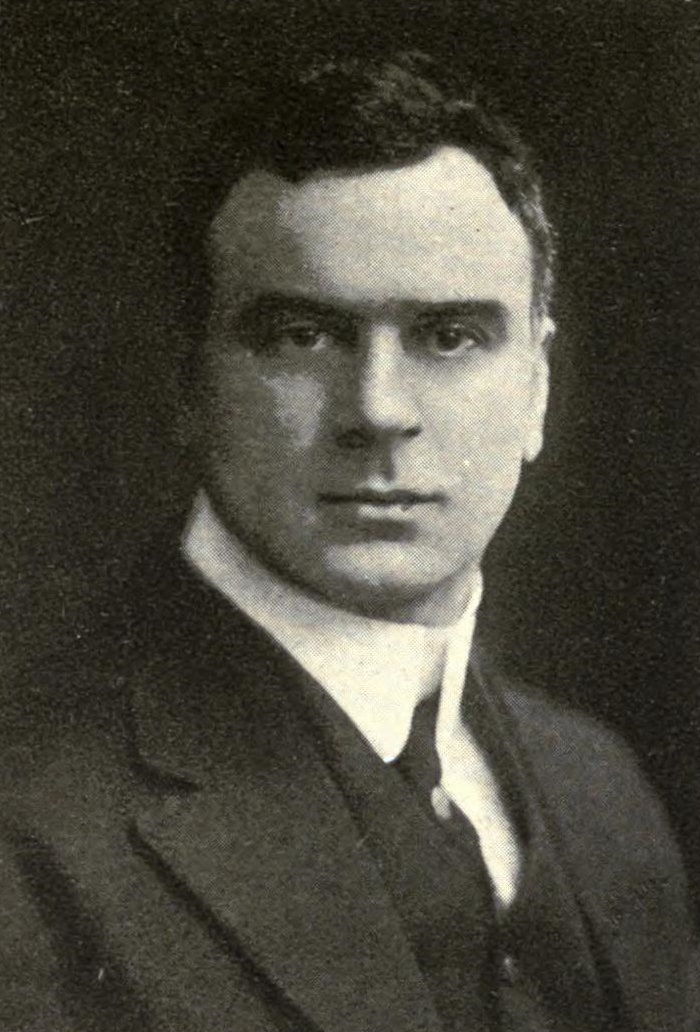
- Born: Arthur John Stringer; February 26, 1874; Chatham, Ontario, Canada
- Died: September 13, 1950 (aged 76); Mountain Lakes, New Jersey, U.S.
- Education: University of Toronto
- Occupations: Screenwriter, novelist
- Spouse(s): Jobyna Howland; Margaret Arbuthnott
- Children: 3
- Writing career
- Notable works: Prairie Wife, Prairie Mother, Prairie Child, Open Water

Arthur John Stringer (February 26, 1874 – September 13, 1950) was a Canadian novelist, screenwriter, and poet who later moved to the United States.

He published 45 works of fiction and 15 other books, in addition to writing filmscripts and articles.

== Early life ==
Stringer was born in Chatham, Ontario. In 1884 the family moved to London, Ontario, where Charles attended London Collegiate Institute. At the Institute he founded and edited a school magazine called Chips. He then attended University College, University of Toronto from 1892 to 1894 and later studied at Oxford University.

== Career ==
Stringer's first book of poetry, Watchers of Twilight and Other Poems, was published in 1894.

In 1895 he worked for the Montreal Herald. At this time he was also publishing in Saturday Night and the Canadian Magazine. In 1898 he got a job with the American Press Association, moved to New York City, and began publishing in The Atlantic and Harper's. His first poem in Harper's, "Remorse", appeared in February 1899. His first novel, The Silver Poppy, came out in 1903. In the same year he bought a farm on the shore of Lake Erie and married actress Jobyna Howland, known as the original Gibson Girl. They divorced in 1914, and Stringer married his cousin, Margaret Arbuthnott.

In 1921, the Stringers moved to Mountain Lakes, New Jersey, where Arthur Stringer continued to write.

Stringer wrote crime fiction and wilderness adventures, mainly using conventional formulae. He wrote as well in many other genres, from social realism (his "Prairie" trilogy, 1915–1921) to psychological fiction (The Wine of Life (1921). He wrote early science fiction novels, The Story Without a Name (1924) with Russell Holman, and The Woman Who Couldn't Die (1929).

Much of his writing was for films. Film scripts on which he worked include The Perils Of Pauline (1914), The Hand Of Peril (1916), The House Of Intrigue (1919), Unseeing Eyes (1923), Empty Hands (1924), The Canadian (1926), The Purchase Price (1932), The Lady Fights Back (1937), Buck Benny Rides Again (1940) and The Iron Claw (1941).

Stringer remained a resident of New Jersey until his death in 1950, aged 76.

== Writing ==
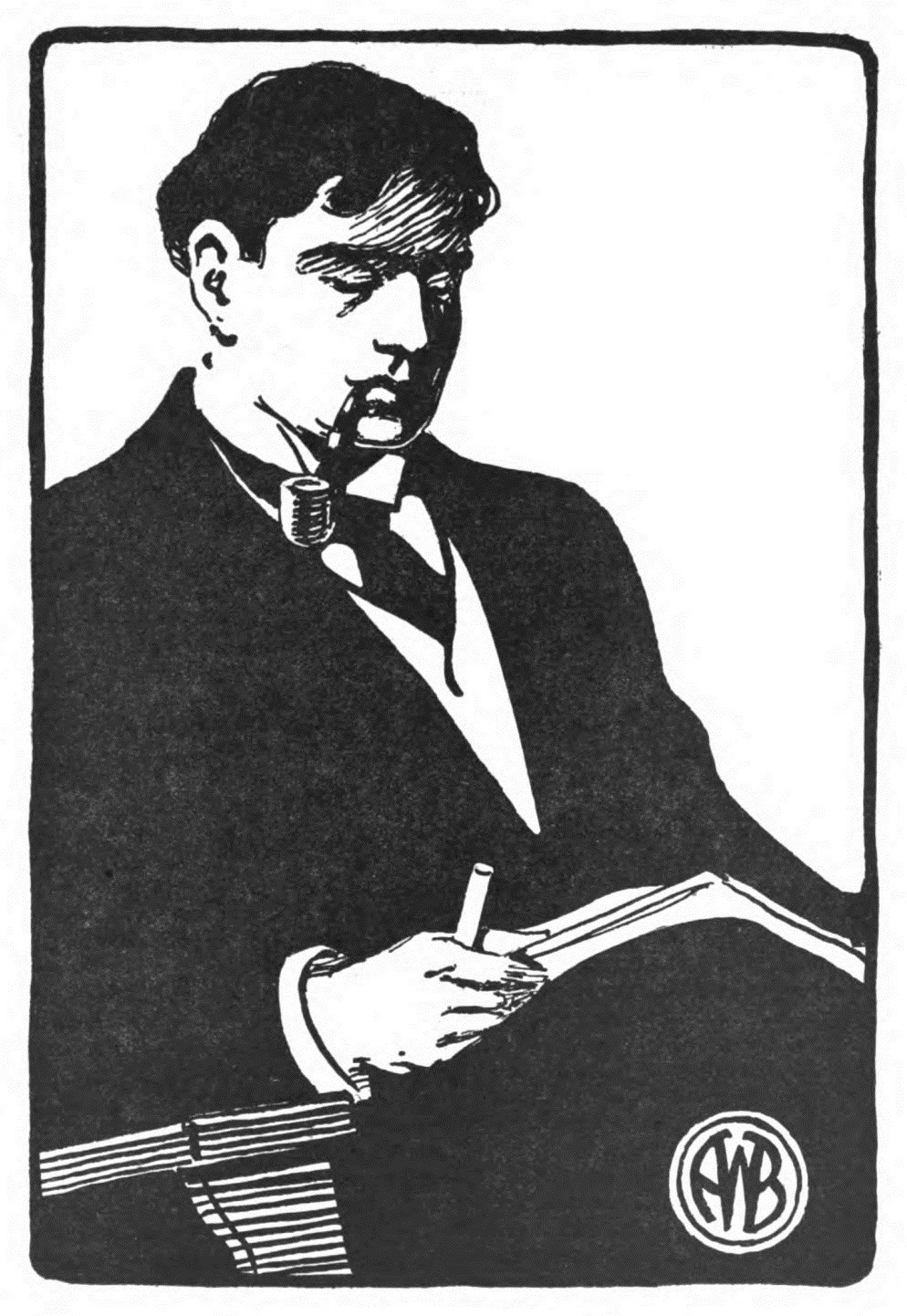
Arthur Stringer

=== Fiction ===
Stringer's crime and adventure stories were later criticized as stereotypical and containing inaccurate representation of Canadian settings. However, his prairie trilogy – Prairie Wife (1915), Prairie Mother (1920), and Prairie Child (1921) – has been called "an enduring contribution to Canadian literature." The trilogy uses a diary form to tell the tale of its narrator, a New England socialite who marries a Scots-Canadian farmer.

=== Poetry ===
The Oxford Companion to Canadian Literature described Stringer's poetry as "undistinguished verse." However, author John Garvin said of his poetry "there is maintained a standard of beauty, depth of feeling, and technical power, which in Canada have had all too little recognition." Garvin also similarly praised Stringer's blank verse drama Sappho in Leucadia.

Stringer's chief claim to poetic fame today rests on his 1914 book, Open Water, the first book by a Canadian poet to use free verse; in its preface he proclaimed that the modernist movement of which he was part was a "natural evolution". Louis Dudek and Michael Gnarowski, who reprinted the Open Water preface in their anthology The Making of Modern Poetry In Canada, remarked on it:

This book must be seen as a turning point in Canadian writing if only for the importance of the ideas advanced by Stringer in his preface. In a carefully presented, extremely well-informed account of traditional verse-making, Stringer pleaded the cause of free verse and created what must now be recognized as an early document of the struggle to free Canadian poetry from the trammels of end-rhyme, and to liberalize its methods and its substance.

== Legacy ==
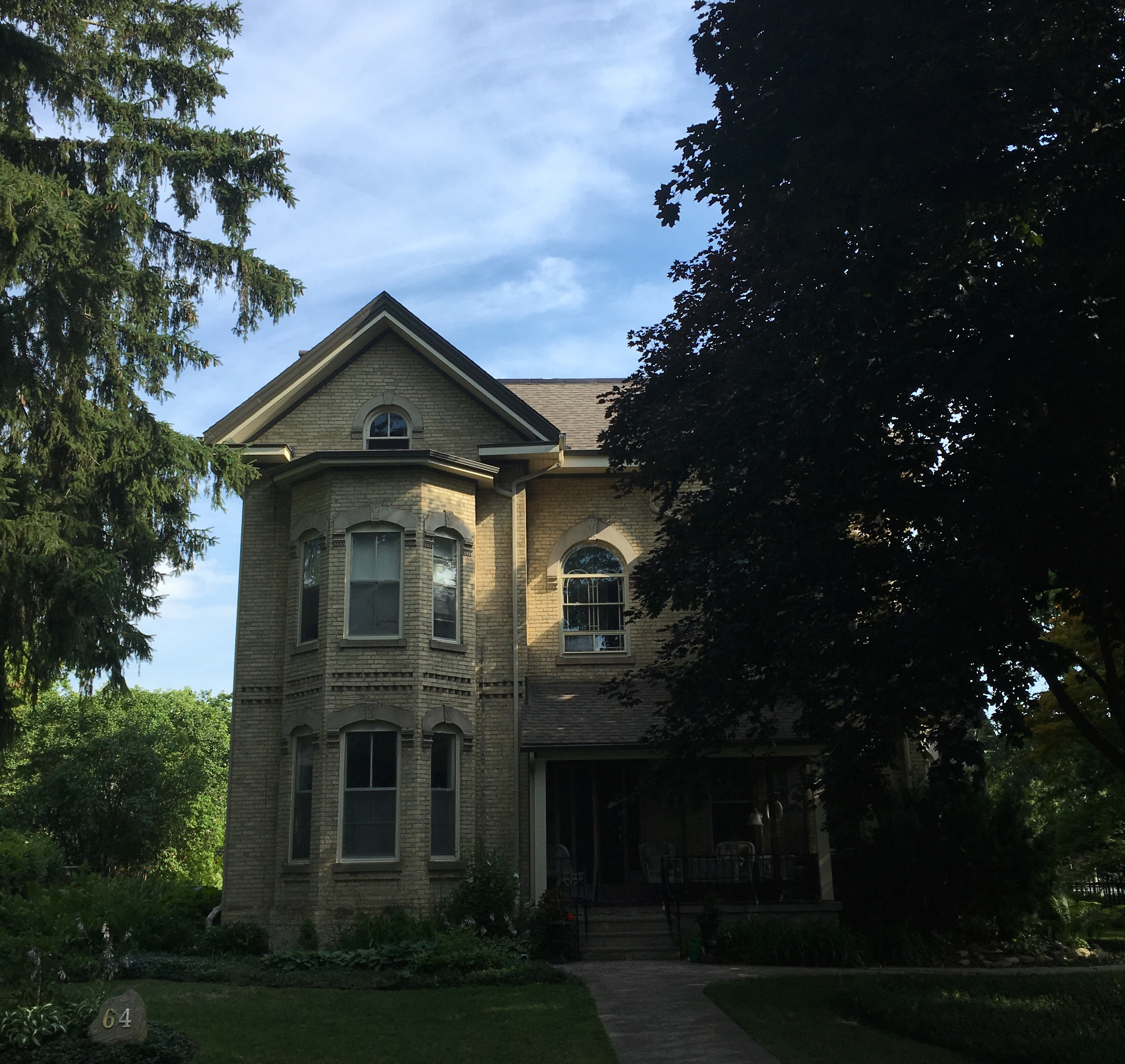
Arthur Stringer House in London, Ontario

Stringer was awarded an honorary D.Litt. by the University of Western Ontario in 1946.

Stringer is commemorated by Arthur Stringer Public School in London, Ontario, which opened in 1969.

The house in which Stringer lived as a boy in London, Ontario has been preserved as a historic site, Arthur Stringer House.

In 2024 Stringer was posthumously inducted into the 'Literary Arts' wing of the Chatham-Kent Cultural Hall of Fame in recognition of his contributions as a novelist, screenwriter and poet.

== Publications ==
=== Fiction ===
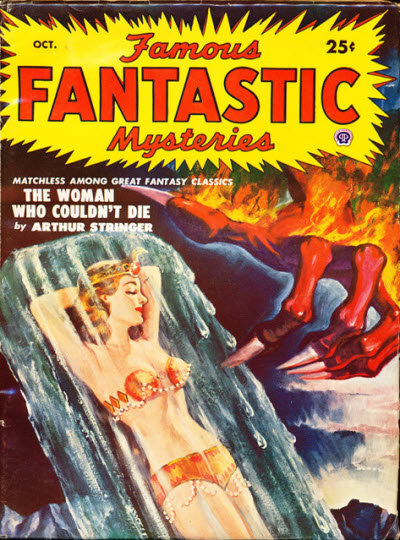
The Woman Who Couldn't Die was reprinted in the October 1950 issue of Famous Fantastic Mysteries

- The Silver Poppy. New York: D. Appleton & Co., 1903.
- Lonely O'Malley: A Story of Boy Life. New York: Houghton Mifflin, 1905.
- The Wire Tappers. Boston: Little, Brown and Co., 1906.
- Phantom Wires. Boston: Little, Brown and Co., 1907.
- The Under Groove. New York: McClure Company, 1908.
- The Gun-Runner. New York: B.W. Dodge & Co., 1909.
- The Shadow. New York: The Century Co., 1913.
- Never-Fail Blake Indianapolis: Bobbs-Merrill, c.1913.
- The Prairie Wife Indianapolis: Bobbs-Merrill, c.1915.
- The Hand of Peril. New York: Macmillan, April 1915.
- The Door of Dread: A Secret Service Romance. Indianapolis: Bobbs-Merrill, c.1916.
- The House of Intrigue. Indianapolis: Bobbs-Merrill, c.1918.
- The Man Who Couldn't Sleep. Indianapolis: Bobbs-Merrill, c.1919.
- The Prairie Mother. Indianapolis: Bobbs-Merrill, c.1920. London: Hodder & Stoughton, 1920.
- Twin Tales: "Are All Men Alike" and "The Lost Titian". Indianapolis: Bobbs-Merrill, c.1921.
- The Wine of Life. New York: Alfred A. Knopf, 1921.
- The Prairie Child. Indianapolis: Bobbs-Merrill, c.1922. London: Hodder & Stoughton, 1923.
- The Diamond Thieves. Indianapolis: Bobbs-Merrill, c.1923. London: Hodder & Stoughton, 1925.
- The City of Peril. New York: Alfred A. Knopf, 1923.
- Empty Hands. Indianapolis: Bobbs-Merrill, c.1924.
- and Russell Holman. Manhandled. (Illustrated with scenes from the photoplay). New York: Grosset & Dunlap, 1924.
- and Russell Holman. The Story Without a Name. (Illustrated with scenes from the photoplay). New York: Grosset & Dunlap, 1924.
- Power. Indianapolis: Bobbs-Merrill, c.1925.
- In Bad With Sinbad. Indianapolis: Bobbs-Merrill, 1926.
- Night Hawk. A Novel. Indianapolis: Bobbs-Merrill, 1926.
- White Hands. Indianapolis: Bobbs-Merrill, 1927.
- The Wolf Woman. Indianapolis: Bobbs-Merrill, 1927.
- Cristina and I Indianapolis: Bobbs-Merrill, 1929.
- The Woman Who Couldn't Die. Indianapolis: Bobbs-Merrill, 1929.
- A Lady Quite Lost. Indianapolis: Bobbs-Merrill, 1931.
- The Mud Lark. Indianapolis: Bobbs-Merrill, 1932.
- Dark Soil. Indianapolis: Bobbs-Merrill, 1933.
- Marriage by Capture. Indianapolis: Bobbs-Merrill, 1933.
- Man Lost. Indianapolis: Bobbs-Merrill, 1934.
- The Wife Traders: A Tale of the North. Toronto: McClelland & Stewart, 1936.
- Heather of the High Hand: A Novel of the North. Indianapolis: Bobbs-Merrill, 1937.
- The Lamp In the Valley. Indianapolis: Bobbs-Merrill, 1938.
- The Dark Wing. Indianapolis: Bobbs-Merrill, 1939.
- The Ghost Plane: A Novel of the North. Indianapolis: Bobbs-Merrill, 1940.
- A King Who Loved Old Clothes. Indianapolis: Bobbs-Merrill, 1941.
- Intruders in Eden. Indianapolis: Bobbs-Merrill, 1942.
- Shadowed Victory. Indianapolis: Bobbs-Merrill, 1943. London: Hodder & Stoughton, 1944.
- Star in a Mist. Indianapolis: Bobbs-Merrill, 1943.
- The Devastator. Indianapolis: Bobbs-Merrill, 1944.

=== Non-fiction ===
- A Study of King Lear. New York, 1897.
- Red Wine of Youth: A Life of Rupert Brooke, 1921.

=== Poetry ===
- Watchers of Twilight, and Other Poems. London, ON: T.H. Warren, 1894.
- Pauline and Other Poems. London, ON: T.H. Warren, 1895.
- The Loom of Destiny. Boston: Small, Maynard, 1899.
- The Woman in the Rain, and Other Poems. Boston: Little, Brown & Co., 1907. 1949.
- Irish Poems. New York: Mitchell Kennerley, 1911.
  - Out of Erin (Songs in Exile). Indianapolis: Bobbs-Merrill, 1930.
- Open Water. London: John Lane Co., 1914.
- A Woman at Dusk and Other Poems. Indianapolis: Bobbs-Merrill, 1928.
- The Old Woman Remembers and Other Irish Poems. Indianapolis: Bobbs-Merrill, 1938.
- New York Nocturnes. Toronto: Ryerson P, 1948.

=== Plays ===
- Hephaestus: Persephone At Enna And Sappho In Leucadia. 1903
- The Cleverest Woman In the World and Other One-Act Dramas. Indianapolis: Bobbs-Merrill, 1939.

== Filmography ==
The following 22 movies were based on fiction by Arthur Stringer:

- 1912 The Man Who Made Good (short) (story)
- 1914 The Case of Cherry Purcelle (short) (story)
- 1916 The Secret Agent (short) (story)
- 1916 The Breaker (story)
- 1916 The Hand of Peril (novel The Hand of Peril: A Novel of Adventure)
- 1918 From Two to Six (story "The Button Thief")
- 1919 The House of Intrigue (novel)
- 1920 Are All Men Alike? (story "The Waffle Iron")
- 1923 Unseeing Eyes (story "Snowblind")
- 1924 Manhandled (story)
- 1924 The Story Without a Name (novel)
- 1924 Empty Hands (story)
- 1925 The Prairie Wife (story)
- 1925 Womanhandled (story)
- 1926 The Canadian (story and scenario)
- 1926 The Wilderness Woman (scenario / story)
- 1926 Out of the Storm (story "The Travis Coup")
- 1928 Half a Bride (story "White Hands")
- 1932 The Purchase Price (story "The Mud Lark")
- 1937 The Lady Fights Back (novel "Heather of the High Hand")
- 1940 Buck Benny Rides Again (story)
- 1941 The Iron Claw (story)
