= Sydney Kirkpatrick =

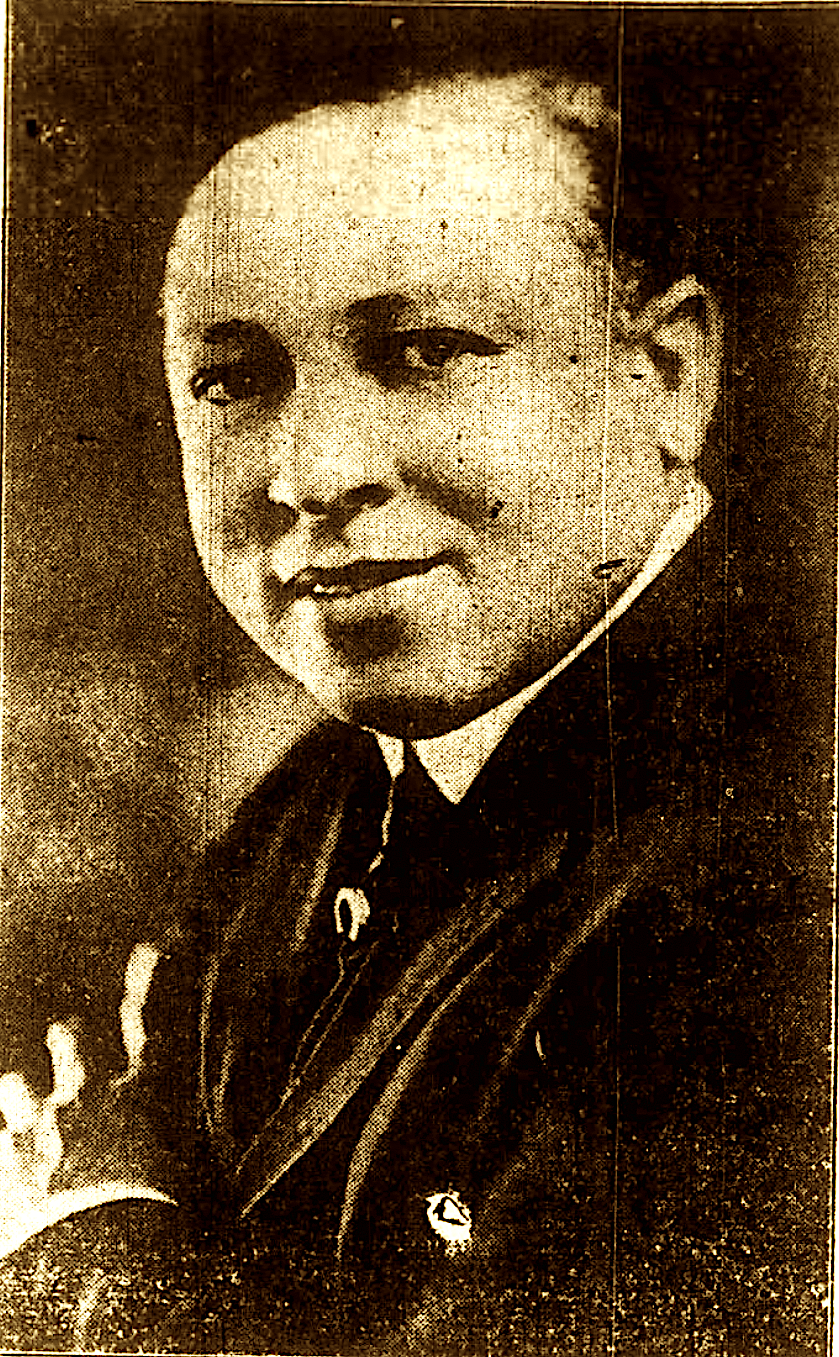
Sydney Kirkpatrick

Sydney Kirkpatrick, also spelled Sidney Kirkpatrick, (born Sydney Kirk, August 5, 1881 — died, October 16, 1930) was an African-American singer and actor. Born in Glasgow, Kentucky and raised both there and in Indianapolis, he began his career touring as a baritone in all-black cast minstrel shows from the early 1900s into the 1910s. In 1915 he transitioned into vaudeville as part of a double act with Tim Ousley. In 1916 he moved into work as an actor with Harlem's Lafayette Players (LP) with whom he performed on a periodic basis through 1929. He became a respected dramatic actor with this group; often performing in plays with his wife, the actress and musician Laura Bowman. He and Bowman also appeared in several Broadway productions together and performed with each other in nightclubs and in vaudeville. One of their last projects together was appearing in uncredited roles in the musical film Dixiana (1930). Kirkpatrick's only other screen credit was a role in the silent film The Scapegoat (1917) which was made by the Frederick Douglass Film Company.

== Early life and career ==
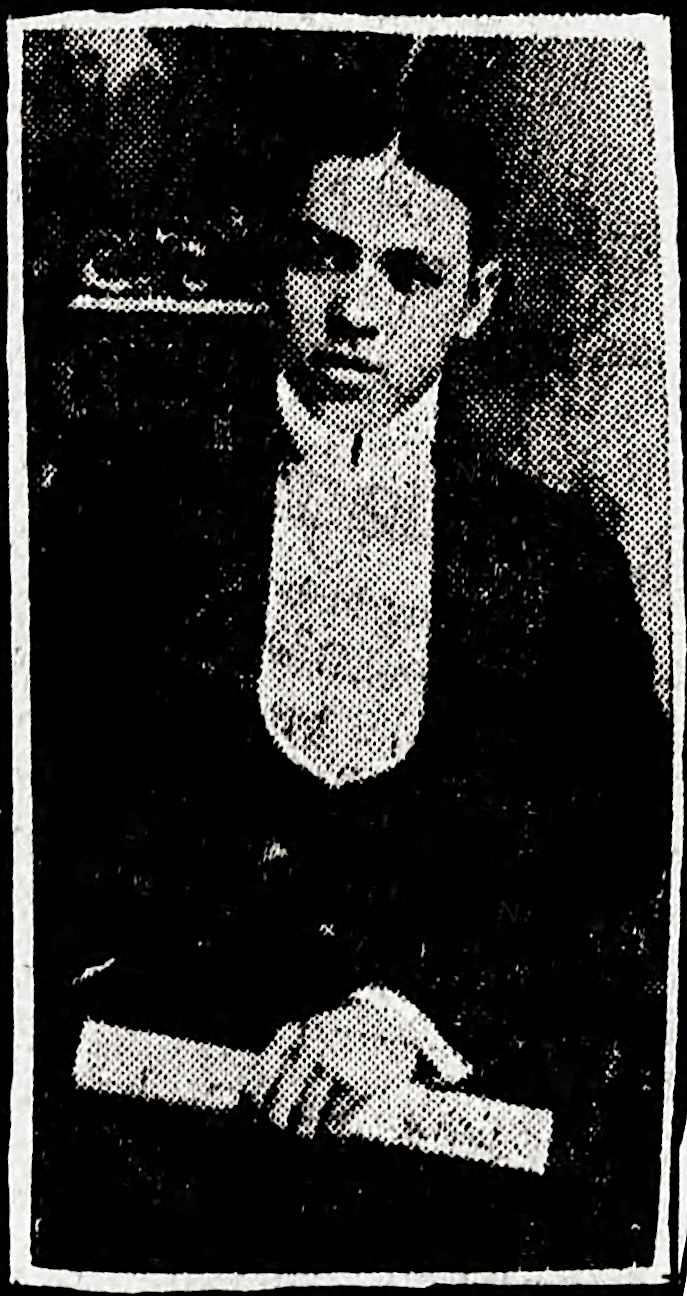
Sydney Kirkpatrick in 1908

The son of Mrs. Martha Susan Miland (sometimes spelled Milam), Sydney Kirk was born in Glasgow, Kentucky, on August 5, 1881. His step-father was James W. Miland whom his mother married in Marion, Indiana, in 1895. Her marital status was listed as a widow at the time of this marriage. Sydney's biological father, his mother's first husband, was Robert Kirk who worked in a tobacco warehouse in Glasgow Junction, Kentucky, at the time of the 1880 United States Federal Census.

Sydney was educated in public schools in Indianapolis, Indiana. He began his career in the early 1900s performing under his birth name. His earliest known performances were in 1902–1903 in a minstrel show organized by Billy Kersands. He was still performing with this show in 1904 by which time he was billed as Sydney Kirkpatrick. He also worked with Richard & Pringle's Minstrels (RPM) in 1903; an all-black cast minstrel troupe. In 1905 he starred in Harry Lawrence Freeman's opera The Martyr at the Columbus Theatre in Chicago, and in 1907 he was a resident singer at the Pekin Theater in Chicago.

By September 1907 Kirkpatrick was working again with the RPM as the company's master of ceremonies at the Colonial Theatre in San Francisco. He was still engaged with the RPM as a "middleman" in 1909. He was a principle singer for this organization with one reviewer proclaiming him "by far the best baritone singer of his race". His repertoire with the company consisted entirely of songs written by African Americans. By 1910 he was credited as a co-director of the RPM shows with Billy King. He toured with the RPM from places as far ranging as Houston (1909), New York City (1910), San Francisco (1911), Grand Junction, Colorado (1911), and San Diego (1912). In 1914 he was a featured soloist at a music festival in Indianapolis organized by a local church. He was still touring with the RPM as late as 1915. Later performances sometimes described him as a tenor.

== Later career ==
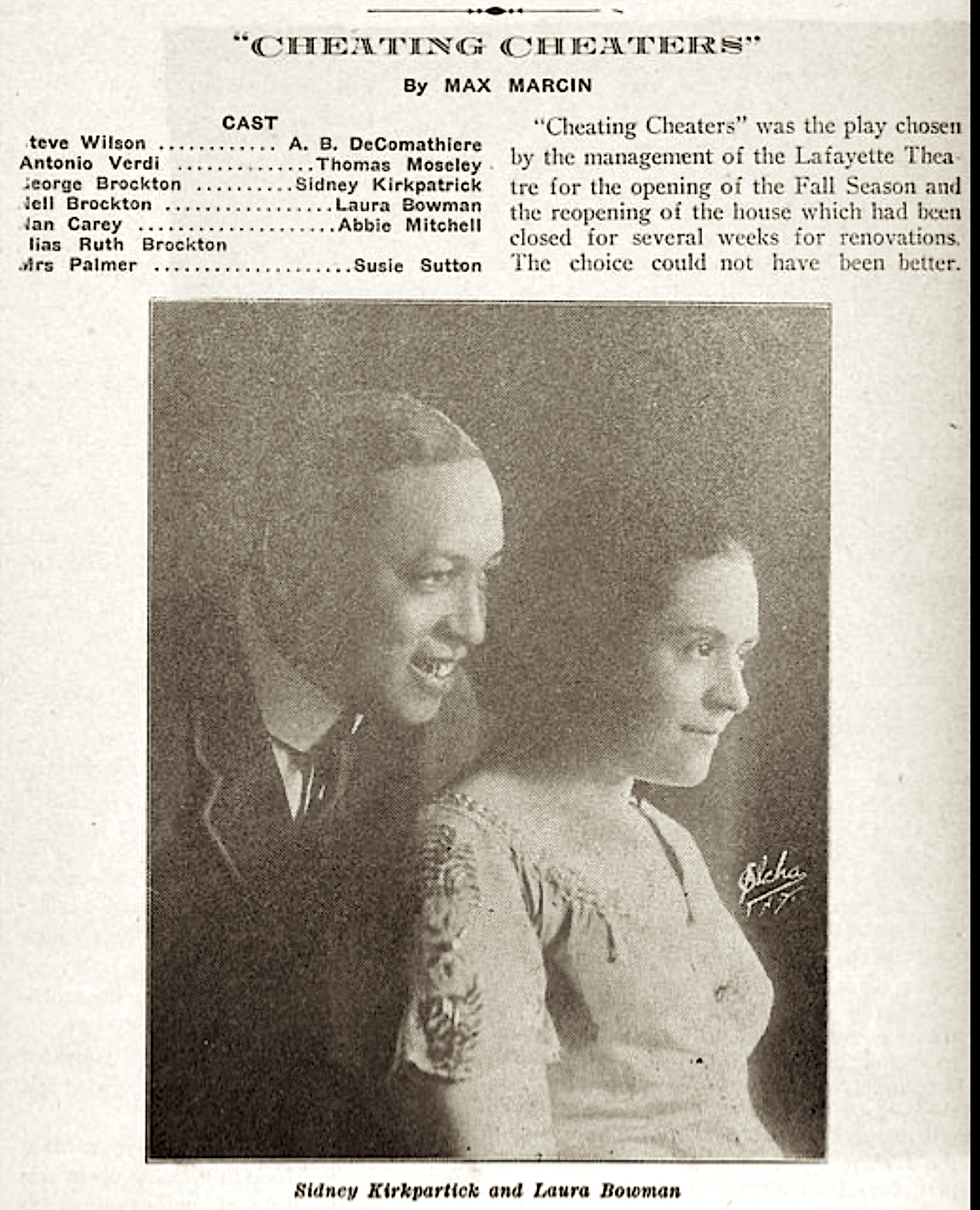
Sydney Kirkpatrick and Laura Bowman in the Lafayette Players production of Cheating Cheaters (1918)

In the autumn of 1915 Kirkpatrick formed a vaudeville double act with Tim Ousley which they debuted in Chicago. The following year he became a member of the Harlem's Lafayette Players (LP) where he met the actress Laura Bowman in rehearsals for Eugene Walter's play The Wolf in late March 1916. Bowman's husband Pete Hampton had recently died and she and Sydney quickly formed a romantic attachment during the production of this play. The couple married in 1917 and at that time purchased a home in Indianapolis; a property later referred to The Indianapolis News as the couple's summer home. Both he and Bowman became celebrated dramatic actors with the LP during the 1910s and 1920s; becoming two of the better known actors in this all-black repertory theatre company. Some of the plays he starred in with the LP included George Broadhurst's The Man of the Hour (1916), Baldwin Cooke's His Last Dollar (1918) Alexandre Bisson's Madame X (1920), Over the Hill to the Poorhouse (1921), Experience (1922, title role), The Girl of the Underworld (1922), Edward E. Rose's The Rosary (1924), Robert J. Sherman's Spooks (1927), and Elinor Glyn's Three Weeks (1928).

In 1917 Kirkpatrick performed in the silent film The Scapegoat made by the Frederick Douglass Film Company. His mother died in Indianapolis in 1919, and he and his wife Laura returned from performing with the LP in New York to attend the funeral. The couple returned to Indianapolis for vacations when not performing, and sometimes performed together at church events in that city in the 1920s. The couple developed a performing partnership which included a vaudeville act in which they toured under the billing the Hawaiian Duet. They also performed together in nightclubs, including the famed Café de Champion, Chicago, a nightclub catering to black audiences. By 1920 they were employed as actors with the Chicago Producing Company; a repertory theatre company at the Grand Theatre in Chicago with whom they performed in the musical Captain Rufus (1920) by J. Ed. Green and Alfred Anderson. With this same organization they starred in the shows That Get's It and Shades of Harlem at the Grand Theatre in Chicago in 1922. They also appeared in plays together at the Avenue Theatre in Chicago in 1921.

In 1921 Kirkpatrick and Bowman toured with LP to theaters in Pennsylvania, Maryland and Virginia. In 1923 they became members of the Ethiopian Art Players (EAP) in New York City. With the EAP Kirkpatrick starred as Silas in The Chip Woman's Fortune and Herod Antipas in Oscar Wilde's Salome which were staged in a double bill at the Frazee Theatre on Broadway in May 1923. Bowman appeared opposite him in these shows in the roles of Aunt Nancy and Herodias. They also performed together in the 1923 Broadway revival of Shakespeare's The Comedy of Errors (as Aegeon and Emilia), and in the 1928 Broadway production of Frank Wilson's Meek Mose (as Enos Green and Josephine). In 1925 they toured with the Andrew Bishop Players in the show Paid In Full. In 1929 they performed at the Lincoln Theater in Los Angeles on tour with the LP. The couple moved to Los Angeles after obtaining contract for film work, and obtaining employment at the Lincoln Theater with its resident stock company. The couple performed uncredited parts in the 1930 musical film Dixiana.

Sydney Kirkpatrick died suddenly in New York City on October 16, 1930. He suffered a heart attack while riding in a taxi, and died soon after.
