= I Live for Love =

1935 film by Busby Berkeley

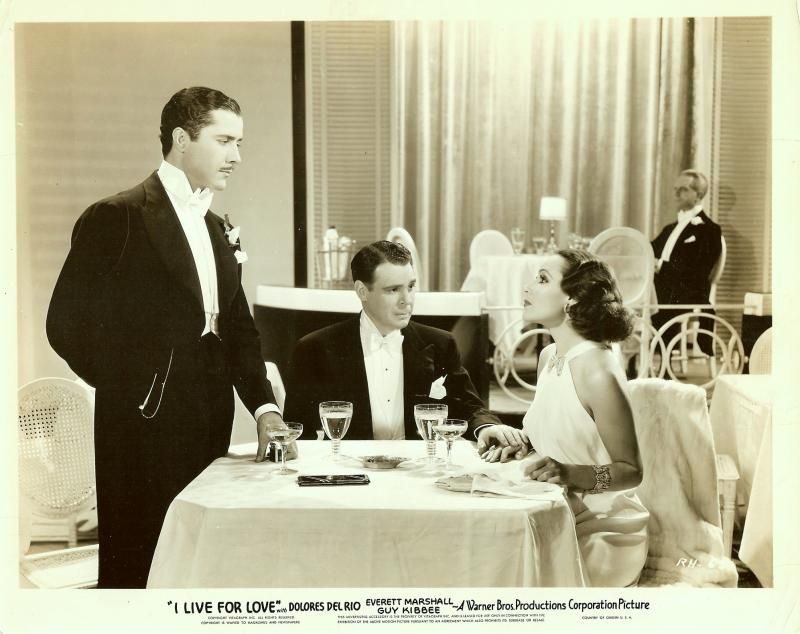
- Dolores del Rio with Don Alvarado and Everett Marshall (sitting)
- Directed by: Busby Berkeley
- Written by: Jerry Wald; Julius J. Epstein; Robert Hardy Andrews
- Produced by: Bryan Foy
- Starring: Dolores del Río; Everett Marshall; Guy Kibbee
- Cinematography: George Barnes
- Edited by: Terry O. Morse
- Music by: Heinz Roemheld
- Production company: Warner Bros. Pictures
- Distributed by: Warner Bros. Pictures
- Release date: September 28, 1935
- Running time: 64 minutes
- Country: United States
- Language: English

I Live for Love is a 1935 American musical comedy film directed by Busby Berkeley and starring Dolores del Río, Everett Marshall and Guy Kibbee.

The film's sets were designed by the art director Esdras Hartley.

== Plot ==
Donna is a diva of the stage and her wish is for her lover, Rico, to be her leading man. To prevent this from happening, the producers pick a man named Roger Kerry from the streets and give him a job.

== Main cast ==
- Dolores del Río as Donna
- Everett Marshall as Roger Kerry
- Guy Kibbee as Henderson
- Allen Jenkins as Mac
- Berton Churchill as Fabian
- Hobart Cavanaugh as Townsend
- Eddie Conrad as Street Musician
- Al Shaw as Street Musician
- Sam Lee as Street Musician
- Don Alvarado as Rico Cesaro
- Mary Treen as Clementine - Donna's Maid
- Robert Greig as Fat Man Dancing at Nightclub

== Critical reception ==
Variety wrote, "The story isn't much ... obvious and pointed, tale creates no particular excitement but it has been brought to the screen with competence. Direction of Busby Berkeley does as much with the plot and situations as could be expected." They commented that del Río gave a good performance and was "favored by the camera" but that Marshall's "screen personality is dwarfed by his strong voice."

== Bibliography ==
- Mary Beltrán. Latina Stars in U.S. Eyes. University of Illinois Press, 2009.
