= Jobyna Howland =

American actress (1880–1936)

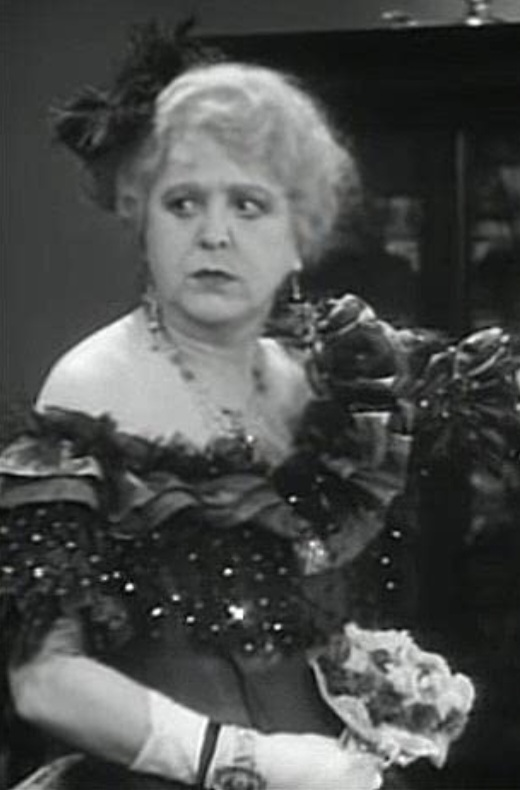
- Howland in Dixiana (1930)
- Born: Jobyna Howland; March 31, 1880; Indianapolis, Indiana, U.S.
- Died: June 7, 1936 (aged 56); Los Angeles, California, U.S.
- Resting place: Forest Lawn Memorial Park, Glendale, California
- Occupation: Actress
- Years active: 1899–1935
- Spouse: Arthur Stringer (m. 1903; div. 1914)
- Relatives: Olin Howland (brother)

Jobyna Howland (March 31, 1880 – June 7, 1936) was an American stage and screen actress.

== Early years ==
Howland was born on March 31, 1880, in Indianapolis, Indiana. Her parents were Joby Howland, a Civil War veteran who at age 11 was one of the youngest enlistees in the conflict, and his wife Mary C. Bunting. She was given the feminine version of her father's name. Her brother was character actor Olin Howland. Tall, regal and beautiful, red-haired Howland once modeled as a Gibson Girl for the famous illustrator Charles Dana Gibson.

== Career ==
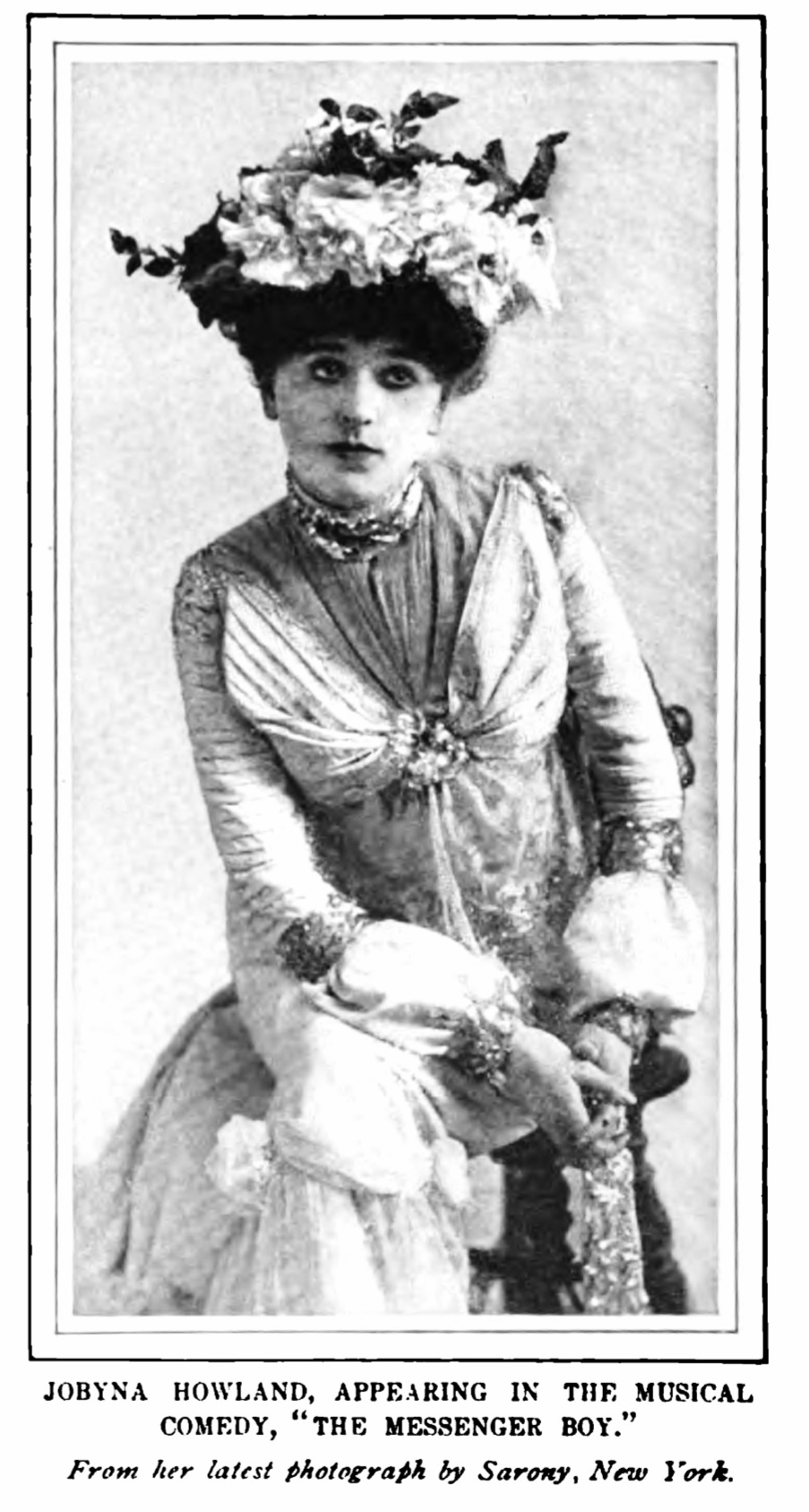
Howland c. 1900

Having performed as an amateur actress, Howland left her Denver, Colorado, home to seek professional work on stage. In December 1897, Howland appeared in A Milk White Flag at the Tacoma Theater in Tacoma, Washington. She also performed in San Francisco. There, she joined a company headed by Clay Clement and went on tour with him.

Howland attracted the attention of a photographer named Thors. His photographs of her were published in the Illustrated American and attracted the attention of Gibson. She worked professionally as a model, beginning her posing a week after she arrived in New York, and she had become a model for Gibson before a month elapsed.

She made her first appearance on the New York Stage in 1899 managed by Daniel Frohman. During her theatrical career, she apprenticed everything from drawing room farces to musical comedies always seeming to play the other woman, a best friend's pal or a distant cousin.

She decided to try her luck in film and moved to a Lloyd Wright (Frank Lloyd Wright Jr.) bungalow in Beverly Hills which was maintained by Hernando, a Navajo servant who liked to sample Howland's makeup. She appeared in a few silent pictures, but this medium did not seem to suit her booming, direct and distinct voice. In sound films, she typically played the kind of roles she had mastered on the stage, the domineering but dependable support. Her appearances in the comedies of Bert Wheeler & Robert Woolsey are some of her best known.

Howland's Broadway debut came as Queen Flavia in Rupert of Hentzau (1899), and her final Broadway role was Amy Bellaire in O Evening Star (1936).

== Personal life and death ==
Howland married Arthur Stringer in 1903, but the marriage didn't last and was dissolved in 1914. She bore no children.

On June 7, 1936, Howland was found dead at age 56 on the kitchen floor of her home. Police attributed her death to heart disease. She is interred in Forest Lawn Memorial Park in Glendale, California.

== Filmography ==
- Her Only Way (1918)
- The Way of a Woman (1919)
- Second Youth (1924)
- Honey (1930)
- The Cuckoos (1930)
- Dixiana (1930)
- The Virtuous Sin (1930)
- A Lady's Morals (1930)
- Hook, Line and Sinker (1930)
- Stepping Sisters (1932)
- Big City Blues (1932) as Serena Cartlich
- Once in a Lifetime (1932)
- Rockabye (1932)
- Silver Dollar (1932) (uncredited)
- Topaze (1933)
- The Cohens and Kellys in Trouble (1933)
- The Story of Temple Drake (1933)
- Meet the Baron (1933) (uncredited)
- Ye Olde Saw Mill (1935) (short)
