= J. Augustus Smith =

American actor, playwright, and screenwriter

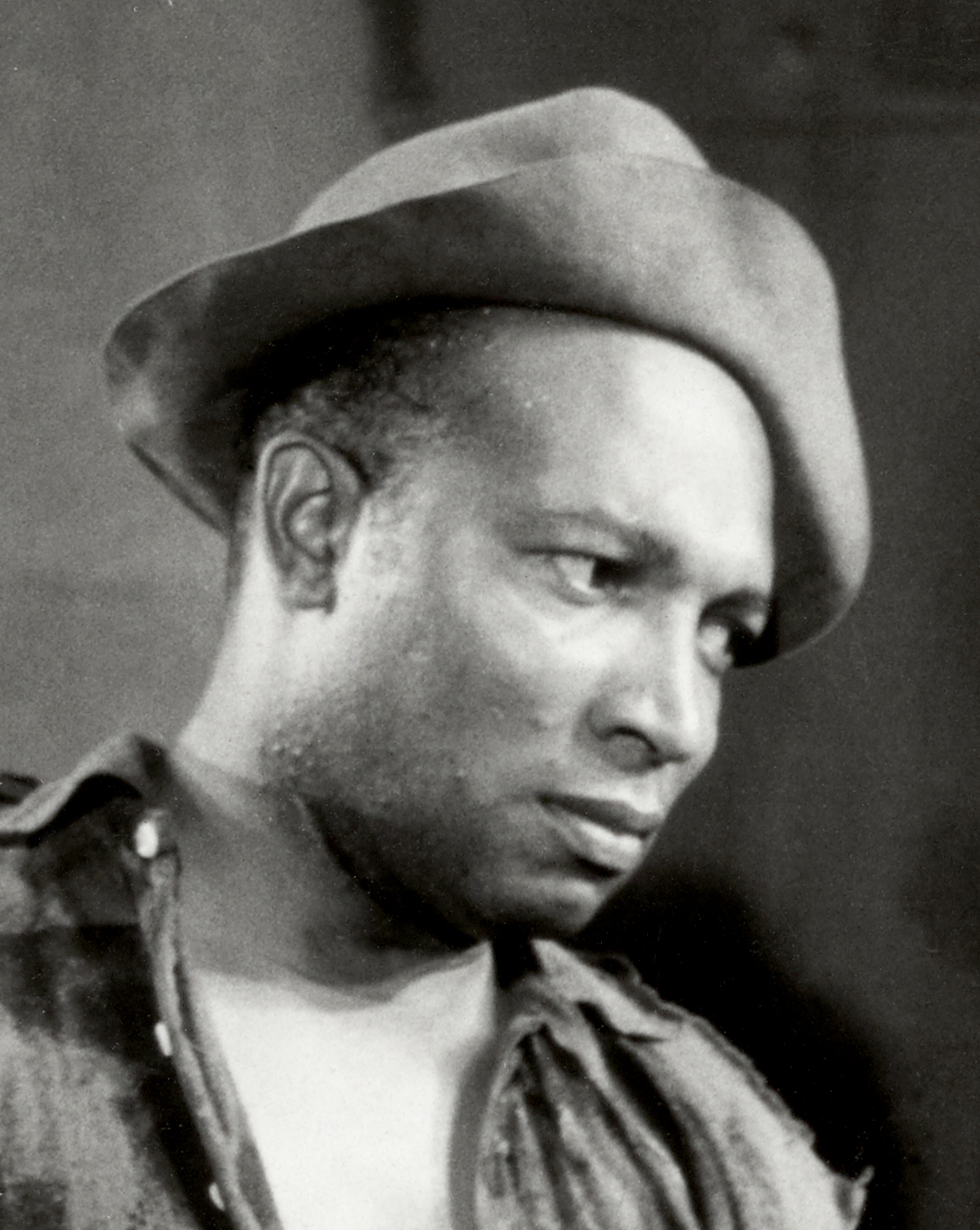
Gus Smith as Forty-Four in the Federal Theatre Project production of his play Turpentine (1936)

J. Augustus Smith, also known as Gus Smith (born January 14, 1891; died December 1964), was an American actor, playwright, and screenwriter. In 1936 he was one of three theatre artists who succeeded John Houseman in leading the Negro Theatre Unit of the Federal Theatre Project in New York City.

== Biography ==
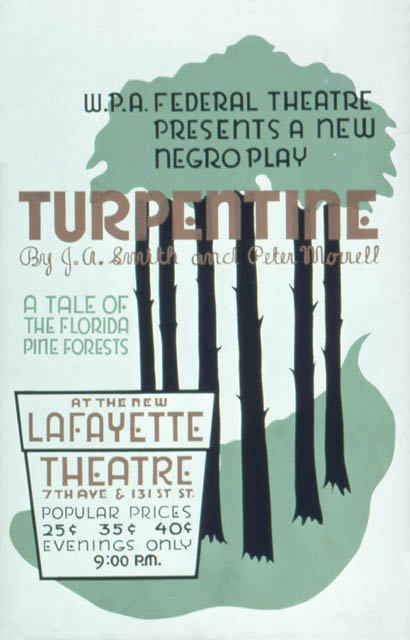
Poster for the Federal Theatre Project production of Turpentine at the Lafayette Theatre (1936)

Smith was born in Gainesville, Florida, in 1891. He made his stage debut during childhood, playing in minstrel shows. In 1911, Smith formed his own minstrel company, with which he toured the United States. He went on to have a career in acting and writing for theatre and film.

Smith wrote and appeared in Drums O' Voodoo (1934). The film was based on his play Louisiana, which premiered in 1933 on Broadway, starring Smith. The stage production featured an all-Black cast, members of the New Negro Repertory Theater Group, founded by Smith. The cast members reprised their roles for the film.

Smith co-wrote, co-directed, and co-starred in Turpentine, a play about conditions in turpentine camps in the American South, for the Federal Theatre Project. In 1936 he was one of a triumvirate of African-American theatre artists who succeeded John Houseman in leading the Negro Theatre Unit of the Federal Theatre Project.

Smith also wrote Just Ten Days, a folk-comedy that played at parks in the Bronx.

Smith and Oliver Foster had the lead roles in the theatrical production Walk Together Chillun.

== Theatre ==
- Louisiana (1933)
- Turpentine (1936)
- Walk Together Chillun (1936)
- Just Ten Days (1937)
- The Case of Philip Lawrence (1937), director
- On Whitman Avenue (1946)

== Filmography ==
=== Actor ===
- Chloe Love Is Calling You (1934)
- Drums O' Voodoo (1934)
- Murder on Lenox Avenue (1941) as Pa Wilkins
- Stolen Paradise (1941)
- Sunday Sinners (1941)
- Hi-De-Ho (1947 film) as Preacher
- Junction 88 as Chinka Lin
- Boarding House Blues (1948) as Norman Norman
- Killer Diller as Stage Hand

=== Writer ===
- Drums O' Voodoo (1934)
