= Pete Hampton =

American singer (1871–1916)

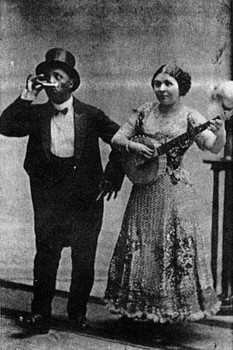
- Pete Hampton with his de facto wife Laura Bowman.

Background information
- Born: Pete George Hampton; August 7, 1871; Bowling Green, Kentucky, United States
- Died: March 16, 1916 (aged 44) New York City
- Genres: ragtime, coon songs, gospel, minstrel
- Occupations: vocalist, harmonica player, banjo player, composer, dancer
- Instruments: harmonica, five-string banjo
- Formerly of: In Dahomey

Pete George Hampton (August 7, 1871 – March 16, 1916) was an American vocalist, harmonicist, banjo player, and vaudevillian from Bowling Green, Kentucky. He was part of various Vaudeville groups of which the most important was his own Darktown Entertainers. In 1903 he starred in the landmark Broadway musical In Dahomey, a work which he had toured in previously the year prior. He made more than 150 recordings during his career in the United Kingdom and Germany between 1903 and 1911. In 1904, he made the first harmonica recording by an African American, regarded as a pioneering example in the development of the blues harmonica style.

== Biography ==
Hampton was born in 1871 in Bowling Green, Kentucky. During his teenage years he was part of a banjo quartet that appeared in medicine shows in Ohio.

In the 1890s, Hampton toured with minstrel troupes and became associated with Bert Williams and George Walker, and by 1902 became part of the Broadway musical In Dahomey.

In 1903, the group went on touring the United Kingdom, where Hampton fell in love with Laura Bowman, a fellow troupe member, with whom he engaged in a common-law marriage. In the same year Hampton was accepted in the Grand Lodge of Scotland. After the original company broke up, Hampton and Bowman, instead of joining the new one, decided to form the Darktown Entertainers quartet with singers Will Garland and Fred Douglas. He toured with the company in many European countries including Germany, Hungary, Austria, France, Switzerland, and Russia, playing a variety of musical styles. The increasing political unrest in Russia forced the group to leave the state and return to England, where they finally were disbanded. After returning for a short period in the United States, Hampton with Bowman got back in London where they joined the second company of In Dahomey, this time with Hampton as one of the principal actors.

Hampton purchased a house in England in 1910 and settled in, but with the outbreak of the First World War the British government forced all immigrants to leave the country and Hampton returned to America. Never fully recovering from the illness he gained while on the boat returning to the United States, he died three years after arriving in America, in 1916.

== Musical style and career ==
Hampton's musical performances are of various musical genres. Although he was not a blues musician in the general sense, he is regarded as an important blues harmonica pioneer. In his performances he played the five-string banjo and the harmonica. Besides being an instrumentalist he was also a composer and singer.

Hampton mostly relied on the so-called "coon songs" written by other composers to be performed in a stereotypical representation of African Americans. But he also performed and recorded his own compositions such as "Dat Mouth Organ Coon" from 1904, which is regarded as the first harmonica composition recorded by an African American artist. Two versions of the composition were recorded for different companies in 1904.

In Hampton's distinctive harmonica playing can be traced early rudimentary examples of the harmonica technique known as bending, used widely in the later style of blues music. Many of his recordings are in the minstrel tradition of the African Americans in which he was raised, such as "When You Die You Are a Long Time Dead" a "jumpy and swinging tune" among others of Hampton's compositions inspired by gospel and camp songs. Among his most successful work as a composer is "Lindy, Lindy, Sweet As Sugar Cane" which he sold to the husband-and-wife duet Charles Johnson and Dora Dean. In his career he made over 150 phonograph cylinders and 78rpm records, mostly recorded in the United Kingdom and Germany.
