= The Greatest Mother of 'em All =

1969 film

- Directed by: Robert Aldrich
- Screenplay by: A.I. Bezzerides and Leon Griffiths
- Produced by: Robert Aldrich
- Starring: Peter Finch; Ann Sothern; Alexandra Hay
- Cinematography: Joseph Biroc
- Edited by: Frank Urioste
- Production companies: The Associates; Aldrich Company
- Release date: 1969
- Running time: 30 minutes
- Country: United States
- Language: English
- Budget: $140,000

The Greatest Mother of 'em All is a 1969 short film produced and directed by Robert Aldrich. It was made with the intention of both showcasing actress Alexandra Hay and to raise the financing for a feature film version of the story.

== Plot ==
Stage mother Dolly Murdock (Ann Sothern) uses the attractiveness of her teenage daughter Tricia (Alexandra Hay) for her own economic gains, leading Tricia to experience a nightmarish loss of innocence.

== Cast ==
- Peter Finch as Sean Howard
- Ann Sothern as Dolly Murdock
- Alexandra Hay as Tricia Murdock
- Katherine Woodville as Eva Frazer
- Barry Russo as Gene Frazer
- Peter Hooten as Jack
- Michael Fox as night club comedian
- Angela Carter as night club waitress

== Production ==
The film was loosely inspired by the relationship between Errol Flynn and Beverly Aadland.

In October 1967, Robert Aldrich signed a four-picture contract with ABC Pictures to make The Killing of Sister George, The Greatest Mother of 'Em All, Too Late the Hero and What Ever Happened to Aunt Alice?

In January 1969, it was reported Leon Griffiths was writing the script. Griffiths rewrite of a 1965 screenplay by A. I. Bezzerides was completed on May 19, 1969.

ABC were reluctant to finance the feature after the box office failure of Aldrich's last film about Hollywood, The Legend of Lylah Clare. Aldrich decided to make a "long trailer" for the film, a 30-minute short to encourage them to provide the money. In particular, he wanted to demonstrate the ability of the girl he wanted to play the lead, Alexandra Hay. "She carries the picture," he said.

It was only the second time Aldrich tested for one of his films, the first being Ursula Andress and Richard Jaeckel on 4 for Texas (1963).

Filming started on July 28, 1969, and ended on August 8. There were two days of rehearsals and eight days of filming - five days of interiors at the Aldrich Studios and three days of exteriors at Zuma Beach, the Los Angeles Zoo, Sunset Strip and Griffith Park. The original budget was announced as $75,000, but the final cost was $140,000.

Aldrich said he deliberately used "very stylistic sets" to "reassure" the cast that "not one inch of this test footage would wind up in the movie."

The film did not succeed in attracting finance for a feature. Aldrich said in 1972 they made the movie "just at the time that everybody was getting very sanctimonious about sex pictures... I think it's pretty good. But nobody wanted this thing about a broken-down Hollywood director who found a 16 year old girl and shacked up with her and had a heart attack, etc. We spent $90,000 getting it mounted to show people what it was all about, which I thought was an ingenious piece of showmanship, but nobody else agreed with me. I also think that it was very stupid timing. If I had been bright enough, I would have known that the cycle had passed. Whereas a year before that picture would have sold like hotcakes. So no more war pictures and no more "Hollywood" pictures for a while. I'm a sucker for them. I can't find any; and I'm trying not to look."

== Legacy ==
While the completed 30-minute short film has never been released, it has been preserved by the UCLA Film & Television Archive.
