= James Bacon (author) =

American author and actor

- Born: May 12, 1914; Buffalo, New York, U.S.
- Died: September 18, 2010 (aged 96); Northridge, Los Angeles, California, U.S.
- Occupations: Writer; journalist; columnist; actor
- Years active: 1954–1986
- Children: Roger Bacon, Kathleen Brooks, Margaret Smith, Thomas Bacon, and James Bacon

James Bacon (May 12, 1914 – September 18, 2010) was an American author and journalist who also worked as an actor in film and television. He wrote historical accounts of his years observing Hollywood and a biography of Jackie Gleason.

== Life and career ==
Bacon was born in Buffalo, New York. He attended the University of Notre Dame from 1933–1936, dropping out during his senior year in order to help his parents, who had recently lost their home in a flood. He earned his degree in journalism in 1943 from Syracuse University and then served in the Navy. After leaving the Associated Press in 1966, he wrote briefly for The Hollywood Reporter and then for 17 years for The Los Angeles Herald-Examiner. He had published a weekly column in Beverly Hills [213] magazine since 1996.

Although a columnist by trade, Bacon appeared in numerous films, generally in walk-on cameos, often as reporters or newsmen. He appeared in all five films in the 'Planet of the Apes' series, becoming the only actor to do so. He portrayed an ape in each of the films with the exception of Escape from the Planet of the Apes, in which he played a human, General Faulkner. This was the only film of the 'Ape' series in which he was credited.

Bacon penned three books in the 1970s and 1980s. His first book, Hollywood is a Four Letter Town, was published in 1977. Its sequel, Made in Hollywood, was published in 1978.

Bacon wrote a biography of Jackie Gleason, which was published in 1985, entitled How Sweet It Is: The Jackie Gleason Story. In 1999, Bacon was the subject of an E! True Hollywood Story episode. Bacon received star on the Hollywood Walk of Fame on April 6, 2007.

== Death ==
Bacon died in his sleep from congestive heart failure on September 18, 2010, aged 96.

== Selected filmography ==
- Black Tuesday (1954) .... Reporter at Electrocution (uncredited)
- The Boss (1956) .... Himself (uncredited)
- Teacher's Pet (1958) .... Himself (uncredited)
- Al Capone (1959) .... Reporter (uncredited)
- The Big Circus (1959) .... Himself - Reporter (uncredited)
- The Rebel (1960, TV Series) .... Dude
- Pay or Die (1960) .... Subway Guard (uncredited)
- College Confidential (1960) .... Himself - Reporter
- The Roaring 20's (1960, TV Series) .... Jim
- Pepe (1960) .... Bartender (uncredited)
- Cry for Happy (1961) .... Press Correspondent (uncredited)
- Underworld U.S.A. (1961) .... Newspaperman (uncredited)
- The Big Bankroll (1961) .... Investment Man (uncredited)
- The Oscar (1966) .... Reporter (uncredited)
- Way... Way Out (1966) .... Reporter (uncredited)
- Planet of the Apes (1968) .... Ape (uncredited)
- The Big Valley (1969, TV Series) .... Hotel Clerk
- 80 Steps to Jonah (1969) .... Hobo
- Skullduggery (1970) .... Commentator
- Beneath the Planet of the Apes (1970) .... Ape (uncredited)
- Men From Shiloh, the rebranded name of The Virginian (1970, TV Series) ... 2nd Reporter
- Escape from the Planet of the Apes (1971) .... General Faulkner
- The Seven Minutes (1971) .... Reporter (as Jim Bacon)
- Adam-12 (1971, TV Series) .... Newsman
- Conquest of the Planet of the Apes (1972) .... Ape (uncredited)
- Night Gallery (1972, TV Series) .... Reporter
- Battle for the Planet of the Apes (1973) .... Gorilla Soldier (uncredited)
- Sssssss (1973) .... Spectator (uncredited)
- The Outfit (1973) .... Bookie
- Planet Earth (1974, TV Movie) .... Partha
- How to Seduce a Woman (1974) .... Himself
- Half a House (1975) .... Jordan's client
- Tunnel Vision (1976) .... Gene Scallion
- The Last Hard Men (1976) .... Deputy Jetfore
- High Velocity (1976) .... Monroe
- The Legend of Frank Woods (1977) .... Cowboy
- Viva Knievel! (1977) .... Reporter (uncredited)
- Rollercoaster (1977) .... Reporter (uncredited)
- The Amazing Howard Hughes (1977) .... Himself (as Jim Bacon)
- Capricorn One (1977) .... Reporter Number 4
- Mean Dog Blues (1978) .... Court Clerk
- Sextette (1978) .... Reporter
- Good Guys Wear Black (1978) .... Senator
- The One Man Jury (1978) .... Reporter
- South by Southwest (1978, TV Series) .... Reporter
- Cat in the Cage (1978) .... Police Captain
- Meteor (1979) .... News Reporter
- The Man with Bogart's Face (1980) .... Reporter
- Underground Aces (1981) .... Businessman #2
- Charlie Chan and the Curse of the Dragon Queen (1981) .... Reporter at Clinic
- The Longshot (1986) .... Track Usher
- Vasectomy: A Delicate Matter (1986) .... Vet (final film role)
