= What Ever Happened to Aunt Alice? =

1969 film by Lee H. Katzin

- Theatrical release poster
- Directed by: Lee H. Katzin (Note: While Katzin received sole directorial credit, approximately half of the film was completed by its initial director, Bernard Girard, before he left the project and was replaced.)
- Screenplay by: Theodore Apstein
- Based on: The Forbidden Garden by Ursula Curtiss
- Produced by: Robert Aldrich
- Starring: Geraldine Page; Ruth Gordon; Rosemary Forsyth; Robert Fuller; Mildred Dunnock
- Cinematography: Joseph Biroc
- Edited by: Frank J. Urioste
- Music by: Gerald Fried
- Production companies: Palomar Pictures Corporation; The Associates & Aldrich Company
- Distributed by: Cinerama Releasing Corporation
- Release dates: July 23, 1969 (New York City); August 20, 1969 (United States)
- Running time: 101 minutes
- Country: United States
- Language: English
- Budget: $1.7 million
- Box office: $3.2 million

What Ever Happened to Aunt Alice? is a 1969 American horror thriller film directed by Lee H. Katzin and starring Geraldine Page, Ruth Gordon, Rosemary Forsyth, Robert Fuller and Mildred Dunnock. The screenplay by Theodore Apstein, based on the novel The Forbidden Garden by Ursula Curtiss, focuses on an aging Arizona widow who hires elderly female housekeepers and cons them out of their money before murdering them. The film's title is a reference to the 1962 horror film What Ever Happened to Baby Jane?, which was also produced by Robert Aldrich. Both films are considered part of the psycho-biddy subgenre, in which a formerly glamorous and now older woman has become psychotic.

What Ever Happened to Aunt Alice? was filmed mainly in Tucson in the fall of 1968. The original director, Bernard Girard, was fired from the project after completing approximately half of the film. Katzin was hired as his replacement, and received sole directorial credit. The music score was by Gerald Fried and the cinematography by Joseph F. Biroc. The film was funded by American Broadcasting Company (ABC), Palomar Pictures Corporation, and The Associates & Aldrich Company.

Cinerama Releasing Corporation released What Ever Happened to Aunt Alice? theatrically in the United States on July 23, 1969. The film grossed $3.2 million domestically, but netted a loss for the studio of $860,000. It received praise for its lead performances from Page and Gordon, as well as for its cinematography and its contemporary Gothic horror elements, though some critics felt the film's plot was predictable.

== Plot ==
Claire Marrable, the vainglorious aging widow of a prominent businessman, is distraught upon discovering that her husband's estate has been stripped of all assets, leaving her in medical debt and with nowhere to live. His only personal effects include a briefcase, a butterfly collection, two antique daggers, and a stamp collection.

Claire relocates to Tucson, Arizona to be close to her nephew, George, and his wife Julia. Late one evening, Claire lures her live-in housekeeper, Rose Hull, outside to plant a pine tree, and clobbers her to death with a rock before burying her in a shallow grave. She hires the timid Edna Tinsley as a replacement housekeeper shortly after. Edna invests money in stocks Claire claims to have gained significant capital on; when she inquires about them, Claire murders her in the same fashion, burying her in the yard beneath a new pine tree. She burns all of Edna's belongings except for her Bible, though she disposes of the front page which bears Edna's name.

At one of George and Julia's dinner parties, Claire is introduced to Harriet Vaughn, a young widow from New England whose husband was a stock broker. Harriet and her young nephew, Jim, rent a cottage from George, much to Claire's displeasure as the cottage neighbors her property. Claire hires retired nurse Alice Dimmock as her new housekeeper. Alice discovers Edna's Bible in Claire's library and is visibly perturbed, and later retrieves pieces of Edna's mail, including letters inquiring about Edna's whereabouts. Claire claims she fired Edna due to her alcoholism, but Alice appears skeptical of her story. Meanwhile, Harriet begins a romance with Mike Darrah, a car restorationist from Phoenix who is Alice's nephew.

One afternoon, a stray Labrador Retriever named Chloe continues to bark viciously outside Claire's house. Claire worries that the dog will unearth the bodies. She reveals to Alice that Chloe is a tramp that Rose used to feed and care for. Mike stops by one day to visit Alice. It is revealed that Alice is posing as a housekeeper to investigate her friend Edna's disappearance. Mike uncovers that Edna's bank account has been almost entirely drained. Claire plans an impromptu trip to attend a music festival in New Mexico the next morning. Alice asks if she can drive into town, claiming she needs to buy toiletries for the trip. In Alice's absence, a suspicious Claire discovers this to be a ruse and finds a letter to Alice from Mike regarding Edna's bank account.

That night, Claire confronts Alice, who admits that she is searching for Edna. Alice accuses Claire of being a serial killer. The women begin fighting, and Claire chases Alice through the house. Claire beats Alice over the head with a phone receiver, rendering her unconscious. The next morning, Harriet stops by to tell Claire that George has been attempting to call, but has been unable to reach her. Inside, Claire tells her that Alice was injured by a falling tree branch during a windstorm the night before and pretends, within Harriet's earshot, to talk to an incapacitated Alice in her bedroom.

That afternoon, Claire dresses herself in Alice's clothes and wig, and drives the incapacitated Alice to a lake and sinks the car. Shortly after, George and Julia arrive at the same time as a telephone repairman. George asks where Alice is, and Claire claims that she went to the drugstore. Mike and Harriet arrive moments later, inquiring about Alice's whereabouts. George receives a phone call notifying him that Alice was found dead in her waterlogged car. That night, Claire invites Harriet and Jim over for dinner and serves them drugged egg nog. Jim is fascinated by Claire's husband's stamp collection, and Claire offers to give it to him. Once Harriet and Jim are unconscious, she drags their bodies into their cottage and lights the home on fire, trapping Chloe in the process.

In the morning, Claire finds the pine trees in her yard upturned and the graves exposed. She is confronted by the sheriff, George and Julia, as well as Harriet, Jim, and Mike; Mike saved them the night before and stopped the fire. Jim returns the stamp collection to Claire, which she learns is, in fact, worth over $100,000. Claire looks over her pine trees and laughs hysterically.

== Cast ==
- Geraldine Page as Mrs. Marrable
- Ruth Gordon as Mrs. Dimmock
- Rosemary Forsyth as Harriet Vaughn
- Robert Fuller as Mike Darrah
- Mildred Dunnock as Miss Tinsley
- Joan Huntington as Julia Lawson
- Peter Brandon as George Lawson
- Michael Barbera as Jim Vaughn
- Peter Bonerz as Mr. Bentley
- Richard Angarola as Sheriff Armijo
- Claire Kelly as Elva
- Valerie Allen as Dottie
- Martin Garralaga as Juan
- Jack Bannon as Olin
- Seth Riggs as Warren
- Lou Kane as Telephone Man
- Spike as Chloe
- Howard Wright as Mourner

== Production ==
=== Development ===
The Forbidden Garden by Ursula Curtiss was published in 1962. The New York Times called it "chilling". The Guardian said it was one of the author's best and should be "read in one sitting". Film rights were bought by Robert Aldrich who had produced two successful horror films, What Ever Happened to Baby Jane? (1962) and Hush...Hush, Sweet Charlotte (1964). Both films dealt with aged women who become scheming or demented, resorting to violence and murder.

In September 1967, Aldrich announced he would make the film under the title What Ever Happened to Aunt Alice? It would be made by his production company, The Associates & Aldrich. In October, Aldrich announced the film would be part of a four-picture deal his company signed with ABC Pictures, the others being The Killing of Sister George (1968), (then uncompleted) The Greatest Mother of 'em All (1970), and Too Late the Hero (also 1970). William Inge was signed to write the script. The film was the first and only motion picture to be produced by Aldrich, but not directed by him.

=== Casting ===
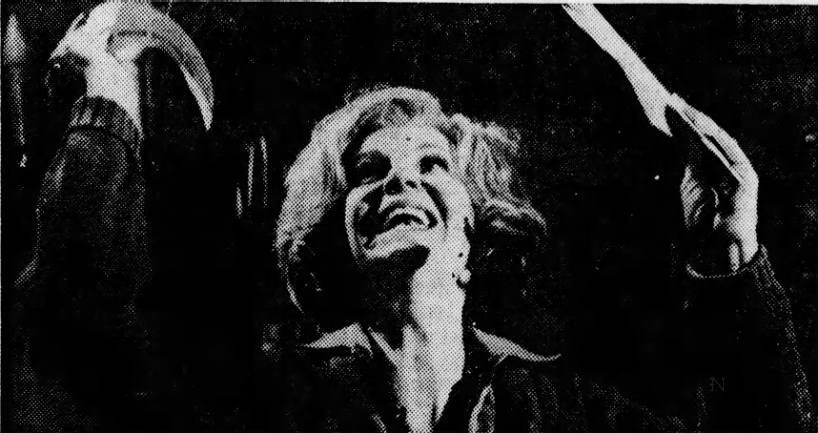
Geraldine Page performing on the set of the film

At one point, producer Aldrich had offered actress Helen Hayes a part in the film. By August 1968, Geraldine Page and Ruth Gordon had signed to play the leads and the script was written by Theodore Apstein. "It's a wonderful part and a wonderful script", said Gordon.

Geraldine Page's character, Claire Marrable, portrayed an aging woman, when in fact, Page was only 43–44 years old at the time during the film's production and release. Commenting to a journalist who visited the film's set, Page stated that she enjoyed the opportunity to play "a villainess," but worried it could lead to her being typecast. Robert Fuller, who had a supporting role, had been signed to a three-picture contract with the Associates & Aldrich.

=== Filming ===
Bernard Girard was hired by Aldrich as the original director of the film. Filming for What Ever Happened to Aunt Alice? began on October 23, 1968, on location in Tucson, Arizona, with additional photography taking place at Aldrich Studios in Los Angeles. The budget for the film was $1,690,000. Portions of the film were shot at the historic White Stallion Ranch near Tucson, while some interiors were filmed in a Los Angeles home which was also featured in the 1915 silent film Ghosts. Renié Girard designed the costumes for the film, which included some pieces from her personal wardrobe.

In November, it was announced that Bernard Girard "has withdrawn due to differences in interpretation" and would be replaced by Lee H. Katzin. According to film critic and historian Glenn Erickson, approximately half of the film was completed by Girard before Katzin took over. Principal photography was completed on January 5, 1969.

== Music ==
Gerald Fried composed the film's score, which at one point was intended to include several French-language songs sung by Lilyan Chauvin. The score features use of organ along with discordant cello and violin instrumentation. The score has been released for the first time by Dragon's Domain in 2025 on a CD and as Download with 13 Tracks and 11 Bonus Tracks and a running time of 77:51 minutes.

== Release ==
What Ever Happened to Aunt Alice? was given brief screenings at the Warfield Theatre in San Francisco in June 1969 before it premiered theatrically in New York City on July 23, 1969 in 48 theatres. It was subsequently given a wide release on August 20, 1969. The film opened the 1969 Cork Film Festival in Ireland, and received its European premiere in London on September 21, 1969.

=== Home media ===
Magnetic Video and ABC Video Enterprises released What Ever Happened to Aunt Alice? on VHS in 1981.

Anchor Bay Entertainment released the film on VHS and DVD on July 11, 2000. It was released again on DVD in 2004 by MGM Home Entertainment, though both releases have been discontinued. The 2004 edition was additionally released as part of the now-discontinued MGM Movie Collection: 4 Horror Movies (alongside Edge of Sanity, The Spiral Staircase and Equus) on February 1, 2011.

On January 17, 2018, Kino Lorber announced they would be releasing the film on Blu-ray and DVD featuring a new 4K restoration. It was confirmed on October 31, 2018, that the film would receive its Blu-ray and DVD release on January 8, 2019. As of 2025, the Kino Lorber Blu-ray and DVD are out of print.

== Reception ==
=== Box office ===
The film grossed $540,000 in its first week screening in New York City, placing number one at the box office in the United States. The film earned rentals of $2,025,000 in North America and $1.2 million in other countries. After all costs were deducted, it recorded a net loss of $860,000.

=== Critical response ===
Critical response to What Ever Happened to Aunt Alice? was largely favorable, with numerous critics praising Page and Gordon's performances, and describing the film as a modern gothic horror film.

The Los Angeles Times called the film a "thoroughly enjoyably romp of jolly horror". Vincent Canby of The New York Times deemed the film "an amusingly baroque horror story told by a master misogynist", and praised Page as an "affecting" actress. Variety similarly praised the acting, noting: "Page as a high and mighty wealthy eccentric delivers a bravura performance. Gordon, working crisply, offers a remarkable portrait of a brave woman. The two ladies play off each other relentlessly and audience reaps the rewards."

Ted Mahar of The Oregonian praised the film's cinematography and suspense, but felt that, despite Page and Gordon "[giving] it their all... the writing is too thin and Miss Page goes through such overworked histrionics that their efforts must simply go down as a nice try in a lost cause." Clifford Terry of the Chicago Tribune also described Page's performance as histrionic, but "consistently and delightfully" so, and similarly described the screenplay as lacking substance. John Bustin of The Austin American echoed this sentiment, describing the film as "a little shallow," but praised its "mood-provoking cinematography and an eerie musical score." The Evansville Press critic Joseph Zendell felt the film suffered from a predictable plot, though he also praised the lead performances from Page and Gordon.

Donald Guarisco of AllMovie wrote: "This Robert Aldrich production is a second-tier version of the thrills he pioneered in his self-directed film What Ever Happened to Baby Jane? The problem is simple: What Ever Happened to Aunt Alice? has the stars right, but the material is underdeveloped. The script has an engaging premise that would be a perfect vehicle for all sorts of creepy thrills, but the story never capitalizes on the possibilities of its memorable lead character duo."

== Proposed follow-up ==
In October 1969, Aldrich announced that he would make a fourth What Ever Happened to... film, 'What Ever Happened to Dear Elva? based on the novel Goodbye, Aunt Elva by Elizabeth Fenwick. However, the film was never made.

== See also ==
- 1969 in film
- List of American films of 1969
- List of films shot in Arizona
- List of horror films of 1969
- List of thriller films of the 1960s
- Psycho-biddy

== Sources ==
- Davidson, James A. (2016). Hal Ashby and the Making of Harold and Maude. Jefferson, North Carolina: McFarland. ISBN 978-1-476-66321-0.
- Shelley, Peter (2009). "What Ever Happened to Aunt Alice? (1969)". Grande Dame Guignol Cinema: A History of Hag Horror from Baby Jane to Mother. Jefferson, North Carolina: McFarland. pp. 123–129. ISBN 978-0-786-45485-3 – via Google Books.
- Silver, Alain (2004) [1995]. What Ever Happened to Robert Aldrich?: His Life and His Films. New York City, New York: Limelight Editions. ISBN 978-1-617-80165-5.
- Smith, Richard Harland (2019). What Ever Happened to Aunt Alice? (Blu-ray audio commentary). Kino Lorber.
