= Too Late the Hero (film) =

1970 film by Robert Aldrich

- Theatrical release poster
- Directed by: Robert Aldrich
- Screenplay by: Robert Aldrich; Lukas Heller
- Story by: Robert Aldrich; Robert Sherman
- Produced by: Robert Aldrich
- Starring: Michael Caine; Cliff Robertson; Ian Bannen; Harry Andrews; Denholm Elliott; Ronald Fraser; Ken Takakura; Henry Fonda
- Cinematography: Joseph F. Biroc
- Edited by: Michael Luciano
- Music by: Gerald Fried
- Production companies: ABC Pictures; Associates & Aldrich Company; Palomar Pictures International
- Distributed by: Cinerama Releasing Corporation
- Release date: May 20, 1970
- Running time: 134 minutes
- Country: United States
- Language: English
- Budget: $6,250,000
- Box office: $1,590,000 (rentals)

Too Late the Hero is a 1970 American war film directed by Robert Aldrich and starring Michael Caine, Cliff Robertson, Ian Bannen and Harry Andrews.

== Plot ==
In the 1942 Pacific theatre of World War II, Lieutenant Junior Grade Sam Lawson, USN, is a Japanese-language interpreter who — so far — has avoided combat. His commanding officer, Captain John G. Nolan, unexpectedly cancels his leave and informs Lawson that he is to be assigned to a British infantry commando unit in the New Hebrides Islands for a combat mission.

The British base is in the middle of a large open field, several hundred yards from the edge of the jungle; on the other side of the jungle is a Japanese observation and communications post. Shortly after Lawson's arrival at the base, a patrol of British soldiers sprint out of the jungle and across the open field, pursued by the Japanese. The base commander, Col. Thompson, instructs his men to keep well back, out of enemy range; they watch as the patrol are cut down by Japanese rifle fire.

Lawson's commando group is instructed to destroy the Japanese radio transmitter to prevent them from sounding the alarm about an American naval convoy which is scheduled to appear on the horizon in three days. The post's radio operator transmits an "all's well" signal every night at midnight; it will be Lawson's job to transmit a fake signal (in Japanese) to buy the Allies another 24 hours.

The commando group is led by Captain Hornsby, an upper class officer with a history of foolhardiness. Other members of the squad are draftees from Singapore who lack enthusiasm for fighting: Pte. Tosh Hearne, a cynical Cockney who is also the squad's medic; Pte. Jock Thornton, a lean Scot whom Lawson at first considers slightly cracked for skipping on patrol and singing the "Teddy Bears' Picnic", Pte. Campbell, a wily Glaswegian; grey-haired Sergeant Johnstone; Signalman Scott the radio operator; Cpl. McLean and Privates Griffiths, Rogers, Currie and Riddle.

By the time the squad reaches the Japanese post, Riddle, Connolly, and Currie are dead from a botched ambush — which, Hearne mutters to Lawson, was entirely due to Hornsby's incompetence. Positioned on both sides of the trail when firing on a Japanese patrol, the British apparently killed their fellow soldiers in friendly fire. When Johnstone is wounded in another encounter, Hornsby leaves him behind where he is shortly killed by Japanese.

After Scott drops and breaks the radio Lawson was to use, Hornsby decides to use the Japanese radio. Lawson refuses to take part in such a scheme, giving the excuse that Hornsby would be disobeying Thompson's orders. Hornsby walks across the Japanese camp, entering the radio hut without being spotted by the tower guard. He knocks out the radio operator and motions to Lawson and Scott. Scott goes to the hut, but despite Hearne's urgings, Lawson again refuses. The Japanese radio operator comes to and shoots Scott; in the ensuing fracas Hornsby is killed.

Lawson is now the ranking officer, with only Hearne, Campbell, Jock, Griffiths, and McLean left alive — and Jock has been wounded in the debacle. Japanese Major Yamaguchi is determined to stop them from reporting the existence of the secret Japanese airfield and planes they have discovered. Through loudspeakers in the trees, Yamaguchi exhorts the men to give themselves up. Lawson and Hearne agree that Yamaguchi is not to be trusted, but Campbell is in favour of surrender. While Lawson and Hearne are asleep, Campbell starts sneaking off, but Jock spots him and asks where he is going. Campbell strangles Jock, wakes Griffiths and McLean, and the three of them run off.

Yamaguchi uses the lives of Griffiths and McLean as bargaining chips, Campbell having been killed in gruesome fashion after the Japanese discover he's taken personal items from a fellow officer the British patrol had killed. As Lawson and Hearne reach the edge of the open field adjacent to the British base, Yamaguchi announces that they have three minutes to surrender; Japanese soldiers have the field covered with rifles and machine guns. Hearne suggests they double back and kill Yamaguchi, leaving the Japanese without leadership.

After killing the Japanese major, Lawson and Hearne sprint out across the field in zig zag motion. Despite cover fire from the base, first one, then the other is hit. One of them rises and staggers to safety.

It is Hearne, who collapses in the field with yards to go. When Colonel Thompson asks who the other man was, Hearne replies, "A hero. He killed fifteen Japs single-handed — thirty, if you like."

== Cast ==
- Michael Caine as Private Tosh Hearne
- Cliff Robertson as Lieutenant Sam Lawson
- Ian Bannen as Private Jock Thornton
- Harry Andrews as Colonel Thompson
- Ronald Fraser as Private Campbell
- Denholm Elliott as Captain Hornsby
- Lance Percival as Corporal McLean
- Percy Herbert as Sergeant Johnstone
- Patrick Jordan as Sergeant Major
- Sam Kydd as Colour-Sergeant
- William Beckley as Private Currie
- Martin Horsey as Private Griffiths
- Harvey Jason as Signalman Scott
- Don Knight as Private Connolly
- Roger Newman as Private Riddle
- Michael Parsons as Private Rafferty (as Michael J. Parson)
- Sean MacDuff as Private Rogers
- Frank Webb as Ensign
- Henry Fonda as Captain John G. Nolan
- Ken Takakura as Major Yamaguchi

== Production ==
=== Development ===
Aldrich later said he first wrote the story in 1959 with Robert Sherman. That year, when he was making films in Europe, he said he was going to scout locations in Burma and wanted Laurence Olivier and Trevor Howard to play the leads.

In 1963, Aldrich was going to make a $14 million slate of eight feature films and one TV series for his production company, The Associates and Aldrich Company, using the success of Whatever Happened to Baby Jane?, Sodom and Gomorrah and 4 For Texas to raise finance. The film projects were Cross of Iron by Lukas Heller, Hush...Hush, Sweet Charlotte, The Tsar's Bride by Robert Sherman, Brouhaha by George Tabori, The Legend of Lylah Clare, Paper Eagle, There Really Was a Gold Mine (a sequel to Vera Cruz) and Genghis Khan's Bicycle, with the TV series being The Man by Heller. Screenplays had also been completed on Now We Know by John O'Hara and Halstead Welles, Vengeance is Mine, Potluck for Pomeroy and Too Late the Hero by Robert Sherman.

Aldrich later said he did the original draft then had it rewritten by Lukas Heller, who "made it a much better script". However, the film was not made until after Aldrich had a big success with The Dirty Dozen.

Robert Aldrich recalled that the production company ABC Films wanted another version of his The Dirty Dozen, and that Too Late the Hero, a property that could use some of the same elements, had been languishing in studio drawers for over a decade. The idea of the film came from an unpublished novel called Don't Die Mad by Robert Sherman, who had worked on several films with Aldrich.

Aldrich later reflected, "When you've had a big, big success, people who should know better lose their perspective about your infallibility. Right away it's 'Let's make another one!' Let's go back and buy the first novel of some guy who, ten novels later, wrote a hit. That's ludicrous. You may have better projects, but you can't sell the better projects, you really can't." Aldrich said the only other "Dirty Dozen" he had in his drawer was Too Late the Hero. MGM wanted to make it but "they wanted a budget of nine million seven to make it, which was too high". He ended up selling The Legend of Lylah Clare to MGM and setting up Too Late the Hero at ABC, where it was made for $6 million.

In October 1967, Aldrich announced he would make the film as part of a four-picture deal he had with Palomar ABC; the others being The Killing of Sister George, Whatever Happened to Aunt Alice? and The Greatest Mother of 'em All. In November, Michael Caine signed to star.

In October 1968, Cliff Robertson signed to co-star. Aldrich said he wanted "anyone but Cliff Robertson" for the lead role, but he was overruled by the studio. Aldrich and Robertson had previously made Autumn Leaves together.

Denholm Elliott joined the cast shortly after Robertson.

=== Historical accuracy ===
The Japanese never were in the New Hebrides in World War II; the American forces arrived in May 1942.

The attitudes depicted in the World War II film, made during the Vietnam War era, reflected the 1960s, with one character talking about "long haired conscientious objectors". The poster advertising the film showed a fallen soldier dressed in a 1960s American uniform and holding an M16 rifle.

=== Shooting ===
Filming started in February 1969.

The bulk of the film was made on Boracay Island in the Philippines, by the same crew and using many of the same sets as Jack Starrett's The Losers. The opening and closing segments were filmed outside the Subic Bay Naval Base using sailors and American civilians as extras.

During filming, Robertson found out he won the Best Actor Oscar for Charly. He had not insisted contractually that he could return for the Oscar ceremony, so Frank Sinatra accepted it for him. "There was no flap", he said later. "If the absence was anybody's fault it was my own." He complained a year later that it would have taken only two days out of the production schedule, and that he had offered to pay production costs but was refused as "a matter of ego".

It was requested that Aldrich film two separate endings for the American and British audiences, one with Robertson surviving.

Filming finished by April 1969. Relations between Aldrich and Robertson deteriorated so much that Aldrich reportedly left the film early, leaving Oscar Rudolph to finish it. However, in June 1969, Aldrich attended a presentation at Aldrich's studios in Los Angeles, where a plaque in Robertson's name was unveiled.

Aldrich later said if Robertson's character had been played "as I wanted it", his character "would have won, even though he is killed and Michael Caine lives".

Shortly after filming, Robertson optioned the rights to Death of a Legend, the story of Blanche Walker Jurika, executed for fighting the Japanese in World War II. He optioned them from Michael Parsons, who was in the cast. Parsons was arrested for possession of hashish in May 1969.

== Reception ==
=== Critical response ===
On review aggregator Rotten Tomatoes, the film holds an approval rating of 62%, based on 13 retrospectively collected reviews with an average rating of 6/10.

Roger Greenspun of The New York Times wrote, "Although committed to the notion that war is an inclusive system of betrayals, the film subverts that notion and settles instead for some fashionable ironies and remarkably conventional jungle war displays." Arthur D. Murphy of Variety called it "an okay World War II melodrama ... the net result is not very much at all, except for a pervading load of bland competence, under the overall supervision of auteur Aldrich." Gene Siskel gave the film one star out of four and wrote, "The essence of an action film is action, and that's precisely what's missing in Robert Aldrich's 'Too Late the Hero.' Oddly enough, Aldrich, who directed 'The Dirty Dozen,' substitutes boredom in the form of an annoyingly long prolog, repititious scenes, and combat in a closed space." Kevin Thomas of the Los Angeles Times called it "a war movie at its most routine. Indeed, it's depressing to consider how much effort and expense were expended with so little to show for it."

=== Box office ===
The film earned rentals of $615,000 in North America and $975,000 in other countries (it had admissions of 294,232 in France). The film was one of the most popular movies in 1971 at the British box office.

After all costs were deducted, the film had an overall loss of $6,765,000, making it one of the biggest money losers in the history of ABC Films.

Aldrich said in 1972 that because the film "was less than successful, so now all our properties are scrutinized at a whole other level. It can get terribly sad, but it's true that your opinion is only as good as your last picture."

Along with his other movies, The Flight of the Phoenix and The Grissom Gang, Aldrich "never understood" Too Late the Hero's lack of success. He thought they were "marvelous movies".

== Home media ==
Too Late the Hero was released to DVD by MGM Home Video on May 25, 2004 as a Region 1 widescreen DVD.

== Novelizations ==
Owing to a geographical separation of rights, Too Late the Hero is one of those films with the odd distinction of having been novelized twice for two different marketplaces. The more straight-ahead (and longer) adaptation was written by William Hughes (official byline of Hugh Williams, not to be confused with the actor) and published in the UK by Sphere Books. The US novelization, written entirely from Sam's POV almost like a stream-of-consciousness tour de force, was written by Con Sellers for Pyramid Books.
