= Fredric Abbott =

Australian actor (1928–1996)

- in The Saint:The Best Laid Schemes (1968)
- Born: Fredric William Abbott; 16 October 1928; Newtown, Sydney, NSW, Australia
- Died: 10 July 1996 (aged 67); Cherrybrook, NSW, Australia
- Spouse: Joanne Mavis Henthorn

Fredric William Abbott (16 October 1928 – 10 July 1996) was an Australian stage, film and television actor.

Of Irish descent, Abbott was born a fifth-generation Australian in Newtown, Sydney and was educated at Newtown Boys High School. His career began in the late 1950s at Doris Fitton's Independent Theatre in North Sydney.

His TV appearances include Z-Cars (1962), The Avengers (1963), The Saint (1963-8), Danger Man (1965-6), The Baron (1966), The Prisoner (1967) episode Do Not Forsake Me Oh My Darling, Man in a Suitcase (1968), Department S (1969), The Champions (1969), The Troubleshooters (1971), Special Branch (1974), and The Flying Doctors (1985). His film appearances include Fun and Games (1971), Tower of Evil (1972), Mistress Pamela (1974) and Revenge of the Pink Panther (1978).

He died in 1996 after an 18-month-long battle with cancer.

== Filmography ==
Year	Title	Role	Notes
1961	The Hellfire Club	Prison Guard	Uncredited
1962	On the Beat	Minor Role	Uncredited
1965	The Good Woman of Chester Square	Norman Swithin	2 episodes
1967	Camelot	Sir Geoffrey	Uncredited
1967	The Prisoner	Potter	Episode: "Do Not Forsake Me Oh My Darling"
1969	Department S	Johnson	Episode: "The Trojan Tanker"
1971	Fun and Games	Forbus	
1972	Tower of Evil	Saul	
1974	Mistress Pamela	John Andrews	
1978	Revenge of the Pink Panther	Douvier's Soldier #1	
1983, 1985, 1988	A Country Practice	Rex Munro, Noel Kitchener, Ron Marshall	6 episodes
1985	The Flying Doctors	Vern Daniels	3 episodes
1986	Prisoner	Andrew Hinton	14 episodes
1991	Home and Away	Roy Jackson	3 episodes
