= Fun and Games (film) =

1971 British film by Ray Austin

1000 Convicts and a Woman
- American Theatrical release poster
- Directed by: Ray Austin
- Written by: Oscar Brodney
- Produced by: Philip N. Krasne
- Starring: Alexandra Hay; Sandor Elès; Harry Baird
- Cinematography: Gerald Moss
- Edited by: Philip Barnikel
- Music by: Peter J. Elliott
- Distributed by: Scotia-Barber (United Kingdom), American International Pictures (United States)
- Release date: 1971
- Running time: 92 minutes
- Country: United Kingdom
- Language: English

Fun and Games (US title: 1000 Convicts and a Woman) is a 1971 British comedy-drama and sexploitation film directed by Ray Austin and starring Alexandra Hay, Sandor Elès, Harry Baird and Neil Hallett. The original screenplay was written by Academy Award nominee Oscar Brodney.

== Plot ==
Seventeen year-old Angela Thorne returns from an American boarding school to live with her father, who has turned his country estate into an experimental open prison, of which he is the Governor. She seeks sexual attention from various prison inmates, leading to blackmail and death.

== Cast ==
- Alexandra Hay as Angela Thorne
- Sandor Elès as Paul Floret
- Harry Baird as Carl
- Neil Hallett as Warden Thorne
- Robert Brown as Ralph
- Fredric Abbott as Forbus
- David Bauer as Gribney
- Peter J. Elliott as Matthews
- Tracy Reed as Linda
- Stella Tanner as Mrs. Jackson

== Critical reception ==
The Los Angeles Times film critic Kevin Thomas penned a positive review, writing, "...slickly made... it is a surprisingly amusing movie, thanks largely to Miss Hay who is clearly having lots of fun... Hers is a very showy role and Miss Hay, a nervy, brittle actress, gives it her all and then some."

The Monthly Film Bulletin wrote: "As tedious as it is unconvincing, Fun and Games (helpfully subtitled 'A Portrait of a Nymphomaniac') charts the one-dimensional adventures of a teenager whose petulance Alexandra Hay suggests with a piercing monotone giggle, forever wiggling her thighs in the direction of the hardened criminals who freely roam around the country club setting of an improbably open prison. The naughty boarding school atmosphere is occasionally interrupted by some aggressively nasty scenes: Angela rubbing off her frustrations on the handlebars of her bicycle, or unzipping her jeans to taunt the moronic Gribney. Despite the film's token attempts to win sympathy for her behaviour with pat Freudian explanations, the camerawork suggests only a cynical and prurient detachment. Most of the prisoners show stalwart good sense in ignoring her silly antics; it's a pity the film's makers did not do likewise."

== Legacy ==
In 2024, Kino Lorber released a restoration of 1,000 Convicts and a Woman on Blu-ray as part of their Kino Cult line. It marked the first ever home video release of the film. The Blu-ray includes an audio commentary by Alexandra Hay's biographer Dylan Dean Staley (featuring excerpts from an audio interview Staley conducted with the film's director Ray Austin) as well as Having Fun Playing Games, an 18-minute featurette by James McCabe, featuring interviews with assistant director Graham Fowler, assistant director Nicholas Granby, stunt actor Paul Weston, and stunt actor Dinny Powell.

Kino Lorber's Blu-ray was favorably reviewed on Blu-ray.com by Dr. Svet Atanasov, who praised the restoration and extras, and also enjoyed the film. Atanasov wrote, "1,000 Convicts and a Woman is a teaser with a distinctly British sense of humor, so if seen at the right time, it can be pretty effective. It looks very good on Blu-ray, too."
