= How to Seduce a Woman =

1974 film directed by Charles Martin

- Directed by: Charles Martin
- Written by: Charles Martin
- Produced by: Charles Martin
- Starring: Angus Duncan; Angel Tompkins; Alexandra Hay
- Cinematography: William Cronjager
- Edited by: William A. Sawyer
- Music by: Stu Phillips
- Production company: Forward Films
- Distributed by: Cinerama Releasing Corporation
- Release date: January 1974 (US)
- Running time: 110 minutes
- Country: United States
- Language: English

How to Seduce a Woman is a 1974 American comedy film, directed by Charles Martin. It stars Angus Duncan, Angel Tompkins, and Alexandra Hay, and was released in late January 1974.

== Plot synopsis ==
Employees of a well-off con man and lady's man Luther Lucas talk about the 5 women he'd most like to bed. To make this happen he'll spare no expense.

== Cast ==
- Angus Duncan as Luther Lucas
- Angel Tompkins as Pamela Balsam
- Alexandra Hay as Nell Brinkman
- Jo Anne Meredith as Melissa Van Der Meer
- Judith McConnell as Ramona
- Heidi Bruhl as Doctor Winifred Sisters
- Vito Scotti as Bill
- Marty Ingels as Jim
- Hope Holiday as Mary
- Lillian Randolph as Matilda
- Janice Carroll as Estelle
- Kay Peters as Jane
- James Bacon as himself
- Jack Bailey as Mr. Toklas
- Jackie Brett as Sally
- Fran Ryan as Mrs. Toklas
- Joe Alfasa as Guido
- Dita Cobb as Fanny
- Billy Frick as Adolf Hitler
- Dave Barry as Ticket Seller

== Notes ==
In the December 3, 1973 issue of Box Office it was reported that Playboy would feature the actresses who star in the film. That issue of Playboy featured a pictorial of Alexandra Hay titled, "Alexandra The Great".
