= How Come Nobody's on Our Side? =

- Directed by: Richard Michaels
- Screenplay by: Leigh Chapman
- Produced by: Maurice Smith
- Starring: Adam Roarke
- Cinematography: Jack Beckett
- Music by: Lamont Johnson
- Production company: Magic Bean Productions
- Distributed by: American Films
- Release date: November 8, 1974
- Running time: 84 minutes
- Country: United States
- Language: English

How Come Nobody's on Our Side? is a 1974 American film which was a spoof of biker movies.

== Plot ==
Two Hollywood stuntmen, Person and Brandy, hit the road on their motorbikes and have various adventures.

== Cast ==
- Adam Roarke as Person
- Larry Bishop as Brandy
- Alexandra Hay as Brigitte
- Rob Reiner as Miguelito
- Penny Marshall as Theresa
- John Garwood as Border Guard

== Production ==
The film was made in 1971. In an interview from that year, Adam Roarke said he co-produced it with his co-stars Larry Bishop and Rob Reiner (although neither are credited as producers). "It's about a couple of guys who can't do anything right, a spoof of motorcycle pictures," said Roarke, who had appeared in a number of biker films (as had co-star Bishop).

Roarke invested much of his own money into the film, which took several years to find a release. "I didn't just raise the money to make this film," he said in 1974, "I had to hock my own house."

The movie was released to cinemas in 1974, although a 1976 article said the film "has run into distribution problems."

== Reception ==
Shock Cinema Magazine said "While it's cool to see Roarke and Bishop in top-billed biker roles, the end result goes straight into the shithole after 15 minutes, and the moment they steal a tank, it careens over the insufferably-wacky borderline."
