= Adam Roarke =

American actor (1937–1996)

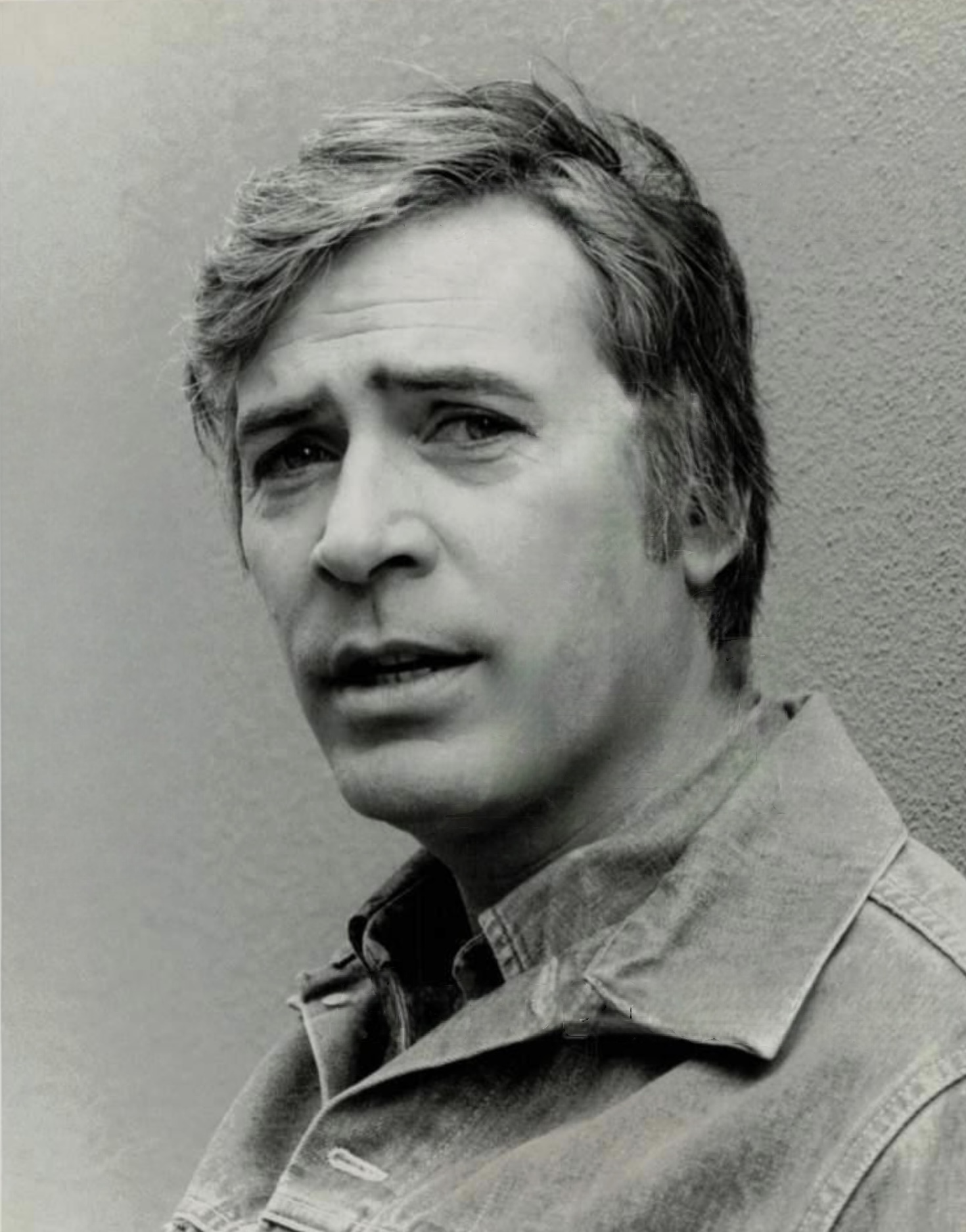
- Roarke in 1976
- Born: Richard Jordan Gerler; August 8, 1937; Brooklyn, New York, U.S.
- Died: April 27, 1996 (aged 58); Euless, Texas, U.S.
- Occupations: Actor; director
- Years active: 1962–1994
- Spouse: Carla DeLane Roarke (m. 1989)
- Children: 2

Adam Roarke (born Richard Jordan Gerler; August 8, 1937 – April 27, 1996) was an American actor and film director.

== Life and career ==
Roarke was born in Brooklyn, New York, where he was a street gang member during his youth. His father was a vaudeville comedian and his mother was a chorus line dancer and showgirl.

Roarke began his acting career under the name Jordan Gerler and then Jordan Grant; when he signed on with Universal Studios in 1957, though, he was told that he needed to change the name, because the studios already had one Mr. Grant (Cary) under contract.

Roarke appeared in a number of television series during the late 1950s and early 1960s, including the role of Communications Officer Garrison in the original Star Trek pilot. He appeared in a string of AIP biker pictures along with Peter Fonda, Jack Nicholson, and Bruce Dern in the late 1960s, beginning with Hells Angels on Wheels (1967), and culminating with The Losers (subsequently retitled Nam's Angels) in 1970. In 1974, Roarke appeared in the financially successful car-chase film Dirty Mary, Crazy Larry, with Fonda and Susan George, a role which showcased his range of acting skills.

His breakout role came in 1980, when he portrayed Raymond Bailey, a self-important leading man, whose stunt double was played by Steve Railsback in The Stunt Man.

== Personal life ==
In 1989, Roarke married Carla DeLane, and they had one child together. A child from Roarke's previous marriage, Jordan Gerler, was also an actor, appearing in Rolling Thunder in 1977.

Roarke died in Euless, Texas, of an apparent heart attack in 1996.

== Filmography ==
- 1962 13 West Street as Jack
- 1963 The Virginian (episode "A Portrait of Marie Valonne") as Jimmy Raker
- 1963 Kraft Suspense Theatre (episode "Are There Any More Out There Like You?") as Paul Durbin
- 1964 Arrest and Trial (episode "The Best There Is") as Sergeant Kelliher
- 1964 The Alfred Hitchcock Hour
  - (episode "A Matter of Murder") as Al (credited as Jordan Grant)
  - (episode "The Sign of Satan") as Ed Walsh
- 1964 Ensign Pulver as Mechanic (uncredited)
- 1965 Fluffy as Bob Brighton
- 1965 The Man from U.N.C.L.E. (episode "The Foxes and Hounds Affair") as Cantrell
- 1965 Twelve O'Clock High (episode "I Am the Enemy") as Captain Davis
- 1966 Star Trek: The Original Series (episodes "The Cage" and "The Menagerie") as C.P.O. Garrison (uncredited)
- 1966 Women of the Prehistoric Planet as Harris
- 1966 The Road West (episode "Ashes and Tallow and One True Love") as Hanson
- 1966 Cyborg 2087 as Deputy Dan
- 1966 El Dorado as Matt MacDonald
- 1967 Hells Angels on Wheels as "Buddy"
- 1968 Psych-Out as Ben
- 1968 The Savage Seven as Kisum
- 1968 The Mod Squad (episode "The Guru") as Rick Potter
- 1969 Hell's Belles as "Tampa"
- 1970 Nam's Angels as "Duke"
- 1970 A Bullet for Pretty Boy as Preacher
- 1972 Frogs as Clint Crockett
- 1972 Play It as It Lays as Carter Lang
- 1973 Medical Center (episode "Night Cry") as Michael
- 1973 This Is a Hijack as Mike Christie
- 1973 Slaughter's Big Rip-Off as Harry (uncredited)
- 1974 Dirty Mary, Crazy Larry as Deke Sommers
- 1975 How Come Nobody's on Our Side? as Parson
- 1976 The Four Deuces as Russ Timmons, The Reporter
- 1976 The Keegans (TV movie) as Larry Keegan
- 1977 Hughes and Harlow: Angels in Hell as Howard Hawks
- 1978 Return from Witch Mountain as Museum Security Guard (uncredited)
- 1979 The Hardy Boys Mysteries (episode "Life on the Line") as Willie Osborne
- 1980 The Stunt Man as Raymond Bailey
- 1981 CHiPs (episode "Home Fires Burning") as Ray Evans
- 1982 The Beach Girls as Carl Purdue
- 1982 And They Are Off as Dale Campbell
- 1986 Trespasses as Drifter
- 1988 Slipping Into Darkness as Sheriff
- 1994 Dangerous Touch as Robert Turner
- 1994 Sioux City as Douglas Goldman (final film role)

== Director ==
- Trespasses (1986)
