= The Legend of Lylah Clare =

1968 film by Robert Aldrich

- theatrical poster
- Directed by: Robert Aldrich
- Screenplay by: Hugo Butler; Jean Rouverol
- Based on: "The Legend of Lylah Clare" (1963 teleplay) by Edward DeBlasio; Robert Thom
- Produced by: Robert Aldrich
- Starring: Kim Novak; Peter Finch; Ernest Borgnine
- Cinematography: Joseph F. Biroc
- Edited by: Michael Luciano; Frank Urioste
- Music by: Frank De Vol
- Production company: Associates & Aldrich Company
- Distributed by: Metro-Goldwyn-Mayer
- Release date: November 16, 1968
- Running time: 130 minutes
- Country: United States
- Language: English
- Budget: $3,490,000
- Box office: 33,798 admissions (France)

The Legend of Lylah Clare is a 1968 American satirical drama film directed and produced by Robert Aldrich, and starring Kim Novak, Peter Finch, Ernest Borgnine, and Valentina Cortese. A satire on Hollywood, full of references to similar films, it recounts how an untalented beginner is hired to play the legendary Lylah Clare, a tempestuous actress who died mysteriously 20 years ago, and is herself consumed by the system. The film is based on a 1963 DuPont Show of the Week teleplay by Robert Thom.

The film was released by Metro-Goldwyn-Mayer on November 16, 1968. Although Aldrich's previous 1960s efforts were praised by critics, Lylah Clare opened to negative reviews.

== Plot ==
Agent Bart Langner finds Elsa Brinkmann, a would-be actress who looks and sounds just like Lylah Clare, a flamboyant star who fell to her death under suspicious circumstances 20 years ago. He persuades arrogant director Lewis Zarkan, who had been married to Lylah, to see her. The two men then convince brash studio head Barney Sheean, who is equally struck, to back a picture with her as Lylah.

Besides coping with the tyrannical Zarkan and easy access to alcohol and drugs, Elsa also has to contend with other hazards of Hollywood, such as malicious journalist Molly Luther and lesbian admirer, acting coach Rossella. As filming continues, her identification with her role gets more intense. She also begins to fall in love with Zarkan, who is happy to sleep with her but his priority is to get his film finished.

By the last day of shooting, her personality seems to have merged with that of the outrageous Lylah, whose fatal fall, we learn, was prompted by the jealous Zarkan. To antagonise him, she first lets him find her in bed with the gardener. Then, as he directs her in a circus scene, she falls to her death from the high-wire, apparently possessed by the same acrophobia that had killed Lylah. The resulting publicity makes his film a huge success, but Zarkan is deeply shaken by the repeat of his being the cause of death of both Lylah and Elsa. The plot ends in uncertainty as Rossella, having lost two women she loved due to Zarkan's obsessions, loads a pistol in preparation to kill Zarkan and possibly herself.

A final sequence, in this case a TV commercial for dog food that interrupts the film itself, suggests that the world of Hollywood is literally one of dog eats dog.

== Cast ==
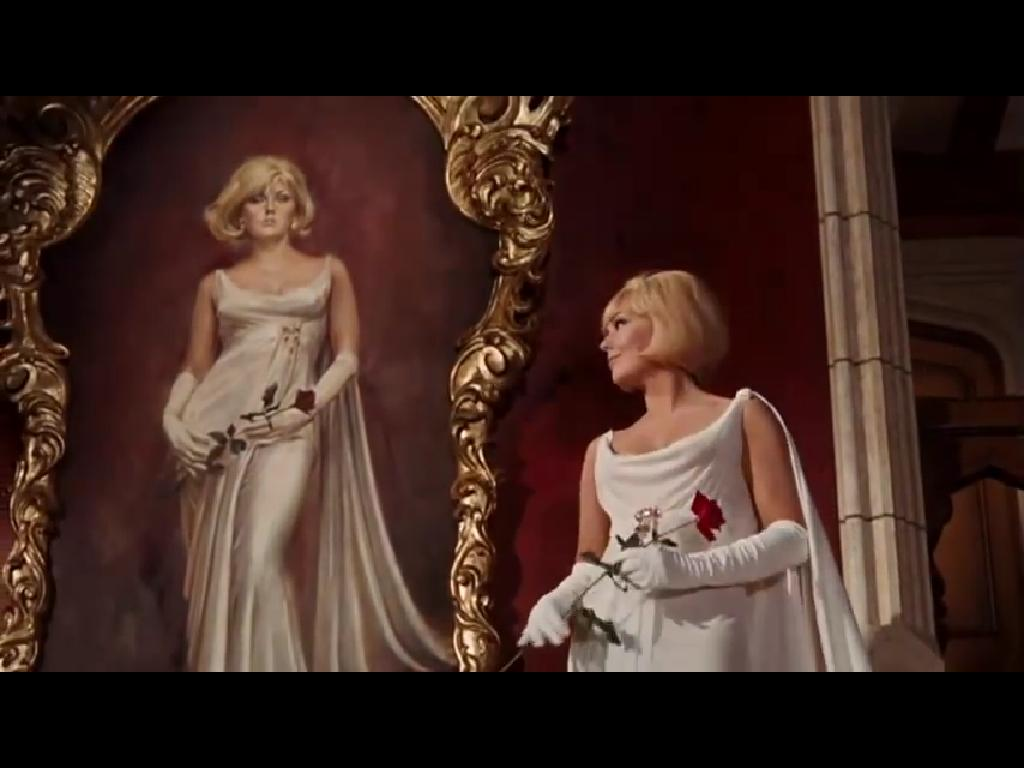
Kim Novak

- Kim Novak as Lylah Clare/Elsa Brinkmann/Elsa Campbell
  - Hildegard Knef as voice of Lylah Clare
- Peter Finch as Lewis Zarkan/Louie Flack
- Ernest Borgnine as Barney Sheean
- Milton Selzer as Bart Langner
- Rossella Falk as Rossella
- Gabriele Tinti as Paolo
- Valentina Cortese as Countess Bozo Bedoni
- Jean Carroll as Becky Langner
- Michael Murphy as Mark Peter Sheean
- Lee Meriwether as Young girl
- James Lanphier as Legman
- Robert Ellenstein as Mike
- Nick Dennis as Nick
- Dave Willock as Cameraman
- Coral Browne as Molly Luther

== Production ==
Film rights were purchased by Robert Aldrich who had made a number of films about Hollywood, notably The Big Knife and Whatever Happened to Baby Jane?.

In October 1963, Aldrich announced he would make the film as part of a $14 million production program of eight films from Associates and Aldrich, including Cross of Iron, Whatever Happened to Cousin Charlotte?, The Tsar's Bride, Brouhaha, The Legend of Lylah Clare, Paper Eagle, Genghis Khan's Bicycle, and There Really Was a Gold Mine a sequel to Vera Cruz. He had prepared scripts on Now We Know, Vengeance Is Mine, Potluck for Pomeroy and Too Late the Hero. Other projects were The Strong Are Lonely, Pursuit of Happiness and the TV series The Man.

In 1965, Aldrich announced that French star Jeanne Moreau would play the lead in Lylah Clare, However, filming was pushed back due to Aldrich being involved in other projects. He made it after The Flight of the Phoenix and The Dirty Dozen, both of which had predominantly male casts. The Dirty Dozen was financed by MGM who agreed to make Lylah. Aldrich said he was talking to the studio when they "were in a buying mood" and he pitched them Lylah, saying it was like The Big Knife.

Aldrich later said it had taken four years developing the script: "We tried to avoid making it Marienbad Revisited. It got terribly disjointed and the big problem was to make it legitimately disjointed and not arty-crafty disjointed."

In May 1967, Kim Novak was signed to play the lead. Hugo Butler and Jean Rouveral wrote the script. Novak hadn't made a film in three years, partly because she had been involved in a riding accident on the set of the film 13 (which became Eye of the Devil) and because she had lost interest in working. She had been briefly married and divorced, and been involved in two car crashes and lost her house in a mudslide. Aldrich was initially thrilled with the idea of Novak in the role stating that she was a rare mixture of "ice and fire". "There are only a handful of actresses who can immediately establish the image of a movie star," he said. "Kim is one".

Before filming Aldrich said "I admit Kim Novak is a gamble. The ideal director for Lylah Care is Losey. If I can get Novak to trust me I think she has the talent to pull it off. If she doesn't it's a dodgy bet." Novak said "I have been on both sides so I can identify with both characters." Aldrich said the Novak character was "an amalgamation of myths. The teleplay, which Tuesday Weld did, and did marvellously, was much more strikingly fashioned to fit the Monroe mould and we tried hard not to do that."

Aldrich said the theme of all his work was that it was about a "man who believes he can control his own destiny, even if he gets killed trying." He said the Finch character "gives in to his self destructive urges to go way beyond himself." Although the film was about a film director Aldrich said it was "autobiographical only in the sense that we may have exaggerated Peter Finch's impatience at suffering fools and that he has to be more patient than he's willing to be."

The male lead was Peter Finch who said he accepted it to work with Aldrich again, and because he wanted to work with Novak. Finch called the film a "Hollywood melodrama with bitter irony, an enormous sense of fun... It's right on the edge of being too much... Zarkan is one of those monsters who can charm people. He's passe, yet you have a sneaking admiration for him. There's something grand and theatrically right about him. Let's say we're a seedy lot in this picture - it's black Mahogany Gothic horror."

Francis Lederer was going to play a role but had to withdraw due to laryngitis and was replaced by Milton Seltzer.

Rehearsals started in June 1967 at MGM studios. Filming began in July 1967.

== Reception ==
=== Critical response ===
The film received generally poor reviews and performed poorly at the box office. The film critic for Newsweek magazine stated that The Legend of Lylah Clare "fights clichés with clichés." Pauline Kael wrote, "there are groans of dejection at The Legend of Lylah Clare, with, now and then, a desperate little titter." Roger Ebert wrote the film was "awful ... but fairly enjoyable", while Life's Richard Schickel felt that the film would catch on as a cult classic because it was "Not merely awful; it is grandly, toweringly, amazingly so...I laughed myself silly at Lylah Clare, and if you're in just the right mood, you may too."

The film is listed in Golden Raspberry Award founder John Wilson's book The Official Razzie Movie Guide as one of the 100 Most Enjoyably Bad Movies Ever Made.

=== Box-office ===
The film was a box-office failure with theatrical rentals of less than $1 million in the United States. Aldrich later said he understood the reasons, and did not think the film was well made but it developed a small cult reputation.

=== Aldrich's view ===
At various times, Aldrich blamed Novak's performance and bad editing for the film's failure. In 1972, Aldrich said "I think there are a number of faults with" the film. "I was about to bum rap Kim Novak, when we were talking about this the other day, and then I realized that would be pretty unfair. Because people forget that Novak can act. I really didn't do her justice. But there are some stars whose motion picture image is so firmly and deeply rooted in the public's mind that an audience comes to a movie with a pre-conception about that person. And that pre-conception makes "reality" or any kind of myth that's contrary to their pre-conceived reality impossible. To make this picture work, to make LYLAH work, you had to be carried along into that myth. And we didn't accomplish that. [...]You can blame it on a lot of things, but I'm the producer and I'm the director. I'm responsible for not communicating that to the audience. I just didn't do it."

In 1977, Aldrich called Novak "the most underrated actress around. The reasons Lylah Clare failed was to do with me; she was badly served by her director. But take a look at her work in Middle of the Night - she was brilliant. I could never understand why after Picnic she was put in so much garbage."

=== Novak's view ===
"I probably shouldn't have made that picture," said Novak later. In 1996, she called it "a weird movie. It didn't have to be that bad." She was upset when she found out Aldrich had Hildegard Knef dub Novak in some lines in a deep German accented voice. "He didn't tell me. I thought I'd die when I saw the movie. God, it was so humiliating."

== Home media ==
The Legend of Lylah Clare was released to DVD by Warner Home Video on October 4, 2011, via the Warner Archive DVD-on-demand system sold through Amazon.

== See also ==
- List of American films of 1968
