= Dirty Mary, Crazy Larry =

1974 film by John Hough

- Theatrical release poster
- Directed by: John Hough
- Screenplay by: Leigh Chapman; Antonio Santean
- Based on: The Chase; 1962 novel by Richard Unekis
- Produced by: Norman T. Herman
- Starring: Peter Fonda; Susan George; Adam Roarke; Vic Morrow; Eugene Daniels
- Cinematography: Michael D. Margulies
- Edited by: Christopher Holmes
- Music by: Jimmie Haskell (Main theme)
- Production company: Academy Pictures Corporation
- Distributed by: 20th Century Fox
- Release date: May 17, 1974
- Running time: 93 minutes
- Country: United States
- Language: English
- Budget: $1.14 million
- Box office: $28.4 million

Dirty Mary, Crazy Larry is a 1974 American road crime drama film based on the 1963 Richard Unekis novel titled The Chase (later retitled Pursuit). Directed by John Hough, the film stars Peter Fonda, Susan George, Adam Roarke, and Vic Morrow.

== Plot ==
Two NASCAR hopefuls, driver Larry Rayder and his mechanic Deke Sommers, successfully execute a supermarket heist to finance their jump into big-time auto racing. They extort $150,000 in cash from a supermarket manager by holding his wife and daughter hostage.

In making their escape, they are confronted by Larry's one-night stand, Mary Coombs. She coerces them to take her along for the ride in their modified 1966 Chevrolet Impala. They ditch the Impala for a Citron Yella 1969 Dodge Charger R/T 440 at a flea market. The unorthodox sheriff, Captain Everett Franklin, obsessively pursues the trio in a Bell JetRanger helicopter, often taunting them via their CB radio; only to find his officers dragnet unable to stop Larry, Mary, and Deke.

As part of the escape, Larry's vehicle enters an expansive walnut grove, where the large trees provide significant cover from aerial tracking, and the many intersecting roads ("with sixty distinct and separate exits") make road blocks ineffective. The trio evades several patrol cars, until one of them - a specially prepared high-performance Dodge Polara police interceptor - effectively keeps up with the Charger until a traffic collision. Immediately after, Captain Franklin himself locates the trio, and pursues them at ground level in the helicopter.

Having finally evaded the police, Larry and company meet their sudden doom when they collide with a freight train pulled by an Alco S-1 locomotive, which unexpectedly emerges from the walnut grove.

== Cast ==
- Peter Fonda as Larry Rayder
- Susan George as Mary Coombs
- Adam Roarke as Deke Sommers
- Kenneth Tobey as Sheriff Carl Donahue
- Eugene Daniels as Hank
- Lynn Borden as Evelyn Stanton
- Vic Morrow as Captain Franklin
- Janear Hines as Millie Stanton
- Roddy McDowall as George Stanton

== Original novel ==
Dirty Mary, Crazy Larry is based on the novel originally titled The Chase (later renamed Pursuit) by Richard Unekis, published in 1963. It was Unekis' debut novel. The New York Times called it "a brilliantly detailed and breathless tale of pursuit".

The story incorporated a phenomenon that was relatively new in 1963: major auto manufacturers were putting powerful V-8 engines into mid-sized cars (the dawn of the "muscle car" era) and young thieves behind the wheel of these cars were now able to outrun the economy 6-cylinder sedans driven by police in many jurisdictions. The protagonists of The Chase used such a vehicle, a Chevrolet, and made use of the checkerboard of roads in the farm country of Illinois to outrun the police, as well as the cover of an approaching thunderstorm. The end of the novel closely matches the film, only with a tanker truck involved in the novel.

== Production ==
=== Filming ===
The film was shot from September, 1973 to early-November, 1973 in and around Stockton, California, mostly in the walnut groves near the small town of Linden, California. The railroad track in the final scene of the film served the Diamond Food processing plant in Linden and was abandoned in the 1980s when the plant switched to trucks for their transportation. The track still exists, in an abandoned state, and is owned by Omnitrax Corp.

The supermarket scenes were filmed in both Sutter Hill and Sonora, California, the drawbridge jump was filmed in Tracy, California, the swap meet scene in Clements, California, and the climactic train crash was filmed on the Stockton Terminal and Eastern Railroad in Linden, near the intersection of Ketcham Lane and Archerdale Road. The Bell JetRanger helicopter used in the climactic chase was flown by veteran film pilot James W. Gavin (who played the character of the pilot as well) and was actually flown between rows of trees and under powerlines as seen in the film.

In the commentary of the 2005 DVD and later Blu-ray releases, Hough says two blue 1966 Chevrolet Impalas, as well as two 1969 (and one 1968) Citron Yella Dodge Chargers were used in the filming. As the film was a low-budget project, and no more than three Chargers could be purchased, a team of mechanics would work on the cars overnight to repair damage, while the film crew would cycle through the available cars throughout the shooting day. The difference between 1968 and '69 Chargers are that '68s have round clearance lights on the fenders and '69s have rectangular lights; and the '68 has a one piece grill while the '69 has a split grill. Car haulers would follow the filming team with the additional cars as they were available.

In the same interview, Hough revealed that the ending in which the Charger crashes into the train was not in the original script. The novel upon which the film was based ended with the robbers colliding with a tanker truck, but since the Linden filming location offered a maze of railroad crossings, the ending was changed to incorporate the collision with the locomotive.

Hough said the lead characters did not die in the script: "I did that myself without asking or telling anybody. Consequently, we would not be able to make a sequel because the leading characters were all killed. But a statement I really wanted to make, was: speed kills. If you're gonna drive a hundred miles an hour, you’ll get yourself killed, so you'd better not speed."

Fonda said the film was shot "pretty much in sequence. We had about 20 exciting stunts and about five minutes' worth of acting. We had to make our scenes count. Adam Roarke, Susan George, and myself were sort of like The Three Stooges I guess you could say...I had a fine time making the film. It was a lot of fun.”

Although Jimmie Haskell is credited with writing the music score, the soundtrack contains no incidental music apart from the theme song "Time (Is Such a Funny Thing)", sung by Marjorie McCoy over the opening and closing titles, and a small amount of music heard over the radio.

=== Post-production ===
When prepared for the premiere television broadcast in 1977, during the telecine process, the colorists mis-color corrected the entire film due to the color of the Dodge Charger, presuming the car was actually bright yellow, not yellow-green. The color shift was subtle enough that it barely affected skin tones and other colors (making the image appear lightly "warmer" overall), so the yellow appearance of the car still appeared to be "correct" to the eye. Therefore, the entire movie on television and early Betamax and VHS releases was very warm toned. The color was corrected in the 2005 DVD release (and later Blu-ray releases) and the Dodge Charger became the actual yellow-green green color.

== Release ==
=== Box office ===
Dirty Mary, Crazy Larry was released by Fox in the spring of 1974 and was a surprise hit. It grossed $650,709 in its opening week in Texas and Oklahoma. It earned rentals of $12.1 million in the United States and Canada, making it Fox's most successful film of the year until the December release of The Towering Inferno. By 1977, it had earned an estimated $14.7 million in theatrical rentals.

Fonda said the film "made a shit pile of money. More money than any film Dennis [Hopper] ever made." He added, "I couldn't believe that so many moviegoers had seen the film four or five times. I could understand them seeing Easy Rider four or five times or maybe even The Hired Hand, but why Dirty Mary, Crazy Larry? Heck, I was even embarrassed by the title."

Nonetheless, the film established Fonda as a draw on the exploitation circuit and most of his films over the next few years were action movies.

On February 18, 1977, the film came to broadcast television (with several scenes cut before the theatrical release reinserted to extend the film's length to the minimum required to fill a standard two-hour time slot). These added-for-TV scenes have never been released to home video.

=== Critical reception ===
The film received mixed reviews from critics. On the review aggregator website Rotten Tomatoes, 42% of 19 critics' reviews are positive, with an average rating of 5/10. Metacritic, which uses a weighted average, assigned the film a score of 52 out of 100, based on 8 critics, indicating "mixed or average" reviews.

Edgar Wright said the film influenced Baby Driver. He said he "always felt sorry for the actor Adam Roarke in it who plays Deke. He's in the movie for the entire thing. You assume in the movie that Adam Roarke is going to die at some point, but he's there right to the end, so it really should be called Dirty Mary, Crazy Larry and Deke. Why does this guy get left off the title? He's been there the whole time."

=== Home media ===
The film was released on VHS and Betamax in October 1979 on Magnetic Video.

On June 28, 2005, the film was released on DVD through Anchor Bay Entertainment as a "Supercharger Edition". It included a color-corrected and fully restored theatrical version of the film as well as many bonus features.

On April 12, 2011, the restored film was released again on DVD, this time through Shout! Factory, packaged as a double feature with another Peter Fonda film Race with the Devil. This release contained fewer bonus features than the Anchor Bay release. The same release debuted on Blu-ray for the first time on June 4, 2013.

== See also ==
- List of American films of 1974

== Notes ==
- Weaver, Tom (February 19, 2003). Double Feature Creature Attack: A Monster Merger of Two More Volumes of Classic Interviews. McFarland.
