= Alexandra Hay =

American actress (1947–1993)

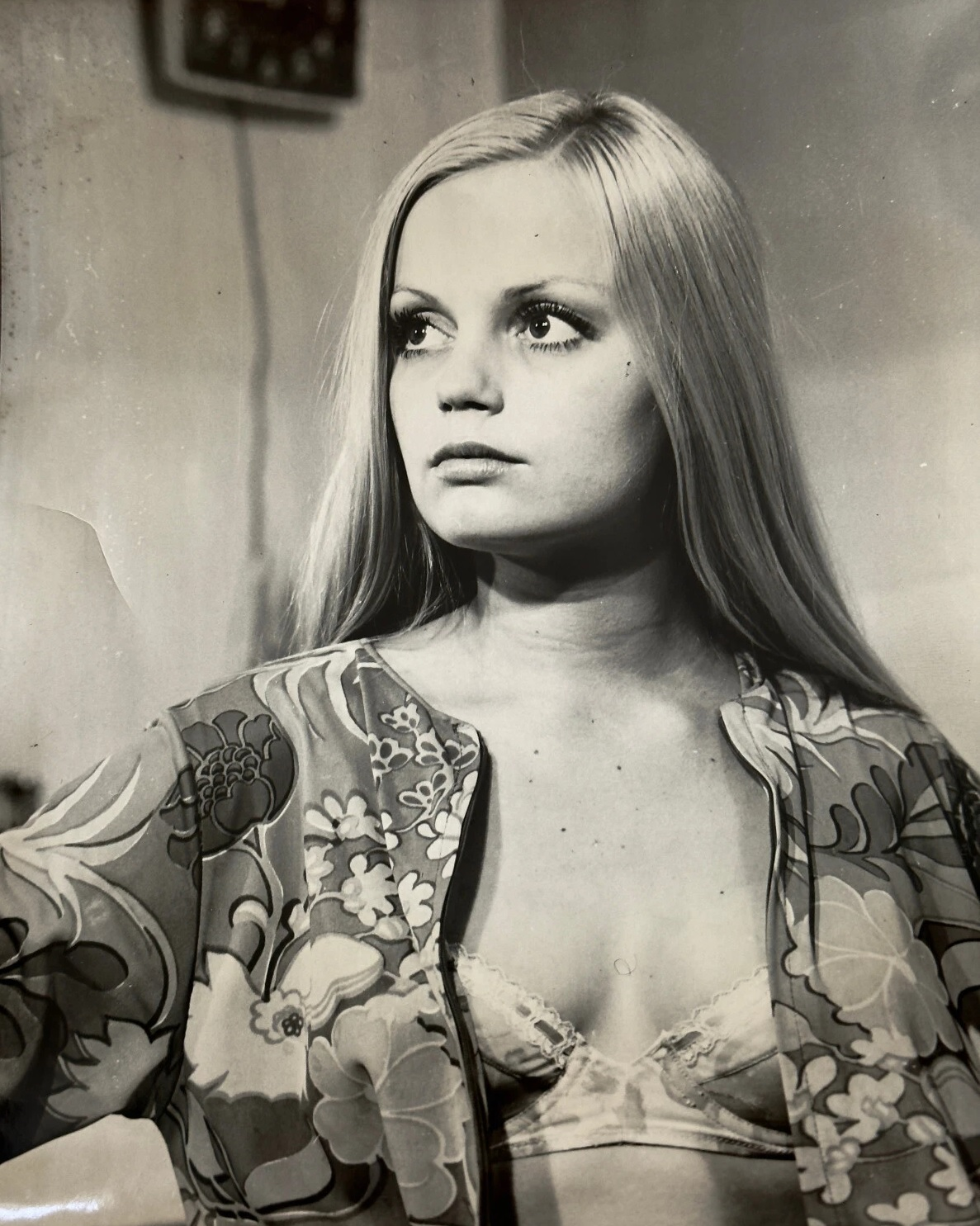
- Hay in Model Shop (1969)
- Born: Alexandra Lynn Hay; July 24, 1947; Los Angeles, California, U.S.
- Died: October 11, 1993 (aged 46); Los Angeles, California, U.S.
- Years active: 1967–1978
- Known for: Her performances in the films Guess Who's Coming to Dinner, Skidoo, and Model Shop

Alexandra Lynn Hay (July 24, 1947 – October 11, 1993) was an American actress of the 1960s and 1970s best known for her roles in Guess Who's Coming to Dinner, Skidoo, and Model Shop.

== Mainstream career ==
On October 29, 1966, the Los Angeles Times reported "Columbia's New Talent Program has developed another young actress, Alexandra Hay, who has been signed to a long-term exclusive contract by the studio."

Hay's first credited role was in an episode of The Monkees entitled "Monkee Mother" (episode 27, original airdate March 20, 1967). Her career continued with small roles in the 1967 movies Guess Who's Coming to Dinner and The Ambushers. In the former, she portrayed a carhop who takes an ice cream order from Spencer Tracy and Katharine Hepburn.

=== The Beard arrests ===
Hay played the role of Jean Harlow in Michael McClure's controversial play The Beard. She was arrested on 14 nights for lewd conduct and later acquitted by the California Supreme Court on the basis that the First Amendment places strict limitations on the application of criminal laws to live theatrical performances.

=== Later career ===
Hay was chosen by the Hollywood Foreign Press Association to be Miss Golden Globe for the 1968 Golden Globe Awards ceremony, which was held at the Ambassador Hotel's Cocoanut Grove on February 12, 1968.

Hay's feature film credits include How Sweet It Is! (1968), Skidoo (1968), Model Shop (1969), The Greatest Mother of 'em All (1969), The Forests Are Nearly All Gone Now (1971; shelved), 1,000 Convicts and a Woman (1971), The Love Machine (1971), How to Seduce a Woman (1974), How Come Nobody's on Our Side? (1974), That Girl from Boston (1975; shelved), Short Letter to the Long Goodbye (1978), and The One Man Jury (1978).

Hay had television roles in episodes of CBS Playhouse; Mission: Impossible; Love, American Style; Dan August; Thriller; Kojak; The Manhunter; The Streets of San Francisco; and Police Story. She also appeared in the television movies The F.B.I Story: The FBI Versus Alvin Karpis, Public Enemy Number One and The Screaming Woman.

Hay was photographed by Mario Casilli for a February 1974 Playboy magazine pictorial entitled "Alexandra the Great".

== Death ==
Hay died on October 11, 1993, at age 46 of arteriosclerotic heart disease. She was cremated by The Alpha Society and her ashes were scattered at sea off Marina del Rey, California on October 19, 1993.

== Legacy ==
Alexandra Hay's life is being researched for a comprehensive biography by writer Dylan Dean Staley, who also recorded the audio commentary track for Kino Lorber's Blu-ray of 1,000 Convicts and a Woman.

== Filmography ==
=== Film ===
Year	Title	Role	Notes
1966	The Bible: In the Beginning...	Extra	Uncredited
1967	Guess Who's Coming to Dinner	Carhop	
1967	The Ambushers	Quintana's Secretary	Uncredited
1968	Star Spangled Salesman	Blonde Girl	Short film. Uncredited
1968	How Sweet It Is!	Gloria	
1968	Skidoo	Darlene Banks	
1969	Model Shop	Gloria	
1969	The Greatest Mother of 'em All	Tricia Murdock	Alexandra Hay's first leading role. This is a completed and self-contained 30-minute short film that Robert Aldrich made to both showcase Hay's talent and to raise money for a feature-length version of the story. A feature version was never made. The short film - while preserved - is presently unreleased
1971	The Love Machine	Tina St. Claire	
1971	1000 Convicts and a Woman	Angela Thorne	Leading role. Also known as: Fun and Games (original title).
1971	The Forests Are Nearly All Gone Now	June Michels	Leading role. During post-production, the film was shelved by writer/director Clyde Ware for personal reasons. Nearly 20 years later, Ware incorporated roughly half of the Forests footage into his film Another Time, Another Place (1989)
1974	How to Seduce a Woman	Nell Brinkman	Premiered at the 1973 Atlanta International Film Festival. This is an anthology film composed of five stories, with Hay being the female lead of her segment
1974	How Come Nobody's on Our Side?	Brigitte	Filmed in 1971.
1975	That Girl from Boston	Willa Starch	Alexandra Hay's final leading role. This film, a comedy based on a popular novel by Robert H. Rimmer, was shelved either during or after post-production. It is presently considered to be a lost film
1978	The One Man Jury	Tessie	Final role. A pivotal scene of Hay's was deleted and the Dead on Arrival re-release cut of the film deleted another scene
1989	Another Time, Another Place	June Michels	A 1989 film that repurposes roughly 50% of Alexandra Hay's performance from the shelved 1971 feature film The Forests Are Nearly All Gone Now. Though completed, Another Time, Another Place ran into distribution problems and was only released as an extremely limited VHS in 1992

=== Television ===
Year	Title	Role	Notes
1967	The Monkees	Clarisse	Season 1; episode 27: "Monkee Mother"
1969	CBS Playhouse	Gayle	Season 2; episode 4: "Shadow Game"
1969	Mission: Impossible	Lynn	Season 4; episode 1: "The Code"
1970	Love, American Style	Erica	Season 1; episode 15; segment: "Love and Mr. Nice Guy"
1970	Dan August	Eadie Parker	Episode 7: "Invitation to Murder"
1972	The Screaming Woman	Evie Carson	TV movie
1973	Thriller	Tessa Nelson	Season 1; episode 7: "A Place to Die". Leading role
1974	Kojak	Elena Rozelle	Season 1; episode 19: "Down a Long and Lonely River"
1974	The Manhunter	Terri Jordan	Episode 2: "The Man Who Thought He Was Dillinger"
1974	The F.B.I. Story: The FBI Versus Alvin Karpis, Public Enemy Number One	Vicky Clinton	TV movie
1974	The Streets of San Francisco	Lori	Season 3; episode 10: "For Good or Evil"
1975	Police Story	Sharon	Season 3; episode 2: "The Cutting Edge"
1978	Short Letter to the Long Goodbye	Claire Madison	TV movie. Original title: Der kurze Brief zum langen Abschied. Broadcast on West German television - not distributed in the United States
