= Leigh Chapman =

American actress and screenwriter (1939–2014)

- Born: March 29, 1939; Kannapolis, North Carolina, United States
- Died: November 4, 2014 (aged 75); West Hollywood, California, United States
- Occupation(s): Actress, screenwriter

Leigh Chapman (March 29, 1939 – November 4, 2014) was an American actress and screenwriter. She began her career in acting during the 1960s, notably in a recurring role as Sarah Johnson, a secretary in the television series The Man from U.N.C.L.E., 1965.

Chapman transitioned to a career in screen and scriptwriting from the 1960s to the 1990s. She focused on writing for action-adventure films, an unusual genre for women scriptwriters in Hollywood during the 1970s. The Hollywood Reporter called Chapman "a pioneering female screenwriter in the action-adventure genre." Her screenwriting credits included Dirty Mary, Crazy Larry in 1974 and The Octagon in 1980. Filmink argued she has "become a bit of a cult figure in recent years."

== Biography ==
=== Early life ===
Chapman was born Rosa Lee Chapman in 1939 in Kannapolis, North Carolina. She graduated from Winthrop College (now named Winthrop University), located in Rock Hill, South Carolina. She married right out of college, and her husband wanted to be an actor, so they moved to Los Angeles during the early 1960s. She initially hired for her first job as a secretary for an attorney at the William Morris Agency, a major Hollywood talent agency. Her marriage ended after a year but she stayed at the agency. She was dating a writer, Ed Lakso, which got her interested in writing. Agents at the William Morris Agency suggested her secretarial position led to her early acting roles.

=== Hollywood beginnings ===
Chapman got interested in acting and began to take classes and do auditions. In April 1963, she joined the cast of a stage production of Come Blow Your Horn. She began to get television work, appearing in episodes of The Eleventh Hour, McHale's Navy, Burke's Law, and Ripcord as well as the feature Law of the Lawless (1963). She had another stage success when she joined the cast of a production of Under the Yum Yum Tree in early 1964. She appeared in Bob Hope Presents the Chrysler Theatre, Combat!, Dr. Kildare, and The Wild Wild West.

Chapman wanted to write and did a "spec" episode of Burke's Law which they liked and bought, launching her writing career. She wrote several episodes of the show. Chapman wrote the feature A Swingin' Summer (1965). She then was signed to write three features for writer-producer Norman Maurer's unit at Columbia, 20,000 Bikinis Under the Sea, That Loving Feeling and It’s a Tuf Life, but the beach party fad ended before any were produced. She alternated between acting and writing, having a semiregular role on The Man from U.N.C.L.E., playing the secretary of Napoleon Solo.

She also appeared in Iron Horse, Occasional Wife, The Professionals (in 1966), and The Monkees. She wrote episodes of My Favorite Martian, Mission: Impossible, and The Wild Wild West. She said "I loved doing Wild Wild West because it was outrageous. The guy I always had the story conferences with, Henry Sharp, he was so much fun, and lively." She remembered on Mission Impossible "at the end, the, quote, clever thing was that the villains were at point A and trying to get to point B, and you wanted them to go to point C, and so you just switched the road signs and they ended up at point C."

In 1967 she wrote Kings X for producer Albert S. Ruddy. She helped write the pilot Where the Girls Are (1968), and appeared in Land's End, with Desi Arnaz, an experience she hated so much it made her decide to quit acting.

She wrote episodes of It Takes a Thief, and Mod Squad. She did the unproduced feature Occam’s Razor (1969) for a company she formed with Harley Hatcher: Har-Leigh. The film was not made. She also was mentored by Howard Hawks. "Plot, or structure, really, is my weakness," she said later. "But dialogue is my strong suit."

Chapman then decided to live in Hawaii for a year.

=== Action films ===
When she returned from Hawaii, she decided to focus on features. Chapman wrote an early treatment for Truck Turner (1974). She wrote the unproduced Blackfather (1974) for producer Norman T. Herman. She was hired to rewrite the script for Pursuit which became Dirty Mary Crazy Larry (1974), a huge success. She also wrote How Come Nobody's on Our Side? (1974). She sold Detroit Boogie (1974), a spec script, to Dino De Laurentiis, and did the prison film The Tin Walls (1975) for Robert Ellis Miller. Neither was made.

Chapman later said she drifted to action films because there were "just my temperament. I couldn’t write a romantic comedy or a chick flick or a love story if my life [depended on it]. I mean, I could write a love story, but it would have to be like a Casablanca type of love story, and some people would have to die. I mean, I daresay, if I analyze this – and I have – growing up the way I did, that my alter ego is male. Because I decided very early on that guys got to have all the fun. I mean, women, what did they do? They fall in love, they get married, they have kids. There are exceptional women in this world, yes there are. But when I was growing up, they were just totally boring...I like larger-than-life characters who do dangerous, heroic things. And that, to me, means men."

Chapman wrote some scripts in the late 1970s — The Laconia Incident (1977), Felonious Laughter (1978), Rhintestone Heights and Motordrome Project (1980) — that were not filmed. She wrote scripts for Steel (1979), and Boardwalk (1979). She wrote the story and script for The Octagon (1980) with Chuck Norris. She wrote the script for King of the Mountain (1981) and did an uncredited rewrite on ...All the Marbles (1981). In 1982, she pitched an idea for a female remake of The Fountainhead, but it was not made.

Chapman wrote Impulse (1990), directed by Sondra Locke and produced by Ruddy. She wrote Storm and Sorrow(1990), based on her own novel. In the early 1990s, she wrote a script for Jean-Claude Van Damme that was not made. Chapman wrote the pilot for Walker, Texas Ranger (1993) but had an unhappy experience and left the show after only writing a few episodes. She did an early draft of what became An Eye for an Eye (1996.

Chapman appeared in the 2001 television film After the Storm.

=== Later life and death ===
Chapman picked up underwater photography during her later life. An exhibition of her aquatic photographs was held at Calumet Photography in Hollywood in 2011. Chapman died at her home in West Hollywood on November 4, 2014, at the age of 75. She had been diagnosed with cancer eight months before. She never remarried, but among the men she dated were Robert Vaughn and Harlan Ellison.

== Television ==
Year	Title	Role	Notes
1966	The Monkees	Joannie Jans	S1:E12, "I've Got a Little Song Here"
