= Six Shades of Black =

Six Shades of Black is a six-part television drama series, written and produced by Peter Wildeblood under the auspices of Granada TV. It aired between April and June 1965.

== Episodes ==
Episode	Starring	Director	Broadcast
The Good Woman of Chester Square	Pamela Brown, Fredric Abbott, Campbell Singer, Thorley Walters, Sheila Raynor	Herbert Wise	30 April 1965
A Touch of Uplift	Bill Fraser, Elizabeth Ashley, Jack May	Herbert Wise	7 May 1965
The Finer Things in Life	Richard O'Sullivan, Ursula Howells	Stuart Latham	14 May 1965
A Loving Disposition	Nyree Dawn Porter, Rosemary Frankau, David Langton, Henry McGee, Frank Thornton	Gordon Flemyng	21 May 1965
The Kindest Thing to Do	Robin Phillips, Faith Brook, David Langton, Peter Thompson	David Boisseau	29 May 1965
There is a Happy Land…	Penelope Keith, Pamela Brown, Robin Phillips, Fredric Abbott, Edward Dentith, Reg Pritchard	David Boisseau	5 June 1965
