= The One Man Jury =

- Theatrical release poster
- Directed by: Charles Martin
- Screenplay by: Charles Martin
- Produced by: Theodor Bodnar; Steve Bono
- Starring: Jack Palance; Christopher Mitchum; Pamela Shoop; Cara Williams
- Cinematography: Irv Goodnoff; Gary Graver
- Edited by: Michael Luciano; Michael Pozen
- Music by: Morton Stevens
- Production company: Cal-Am Productions
- Distributed by: Cal-Am Artists; Manson International
- Release date: September 29, 1978
- Running time: 101 minutes
- Country: United States
- Language: English

The One Man Jury (released as The Loner on UK video) is a 1978 American neo-noir film directed by Charles Martin (1910-1983) and starring Jack Palance, Christopher Mitchum, Pamela Shoop, and Cara Williams.

== Plot ==
Jim Wade (Jack Palance) is a ruthless cop with a bad reputation of being rude to suspects, informants, witnesses, and just about anyone who crosses paths with him in the wrong way. When a mysterious serial killer named the Slasher starts killing women, Wade vows to end the killing spree by any means possible, whether legal or not.

== Cast ==
- Jack Palance as Lieutenant Wade
- Christopher Mitchum as Sergeant Blake
- Pamela Shoop as Wendy Sommerset
- Cara Williams as Nancy
- Joe Spinell as Mike
- Jeff McCracken as Billy Joe
- Alexandra Hay as Tessie
- Angel Tompkins as Kitty
- Andy Romano as Chickie
- Tom Pedi as Angie
- Richard Foronjy as Al
- Frank Pesce as Freddie
- Dick Yarmy as Customer
- Kirk Scott
