= The Big Knife =

1955 film by Robert Aldrich

- Theatrical release poster
- Directed by: Robert Aldrich
- Screenplay by: James Poe
- Based on: The Big Knife by Clifford Odets
- Produced by: Robert Aldrich
- Starring: Jack Palance; Ida Lupino; Wendell Corey; Jean Hagen; Rod Steiger; Shelley Winters; Ilka Chase; Everett Sloane
- Cinematography: Ernest Laszlo
- Edited by: Michael Luciano
- Music by: Frank De Vol
- Production companies: The Associates; Aldrich Company
- Distributed by: United Artists
- Release date: November 25, 1955
- Running time: 111 minutes
- Country: United States
- Language: English
- Budget: $400,000–460,000
- Box office: $1,250,000; 220,066 admissions (France)

The Big Knife is a 1955 American melodrama film produced and directed by Robert Aldrich from a screenplay by James Poe, based on the 1949 play by Clifford Odets. The film stars Jack Palance, Ida Lupino, Wendell Corey, Jean Hagen, Rod Steiger, Shelley Winters, Ilka Chase, and Everett Sloane.

The story delves into the dark side of Hollywood, exploring themes of corruption, betrayal, and the destructive nature of fame. Jack Palance plays a conflicted film star trapped by his own success and the manipulations of the film industry. The film is noted for its intense atmosphere and sharp critique of the pressures and moral compromises inherent in show business. It received critical acclaim for its direction, screenplay, and strong ensemble cast, cementing its place as a significant work in 1950s American cinema.

== Plot ==
In Los Angeles, movie actor Charlie Castle (in voice-over narration) admits he "sold out his dreams but can't forget them." Studio publicist Buddy Bliss alerts him that Patty Benedict, an influential gossip columnist, has arrived. The two discuss Charlie's rumored separation from his wife, Marion. Charlie declines to discuss the matter, and Patty instead inquires about a years-old scandal, involving a fatal accident that sent Buddy to jail.

Marion arrives and is asked personal questions by Patty, which Marion declines to answer. Alone together, Marion questions her husband's future career plans, including whether Charlie will sign a new seven-year contract to Stanley Hoff, the studio boss. Charlie admits he is delaying to sign the contract so he doesn't lose her. Later that day, Charlie's agent Nat Danziger, who has met with Hoff, advises him to sign the contract or face jail time. Nat then informs Charlie that Hoff and Smiley Coy are arriving to close the deal.

Inside, Charlie tells Hoff that he will not sign the contract. Hoff tries to manipulatively persuade Charlie, but he remains defiant, which angers Hoff. Sometime later, Charlie invites Buddy's seductive wife Connie over for drinks. Connie asks Charlie why he allowed Buddy to take the fall for his accident. Later that night, Charlie and Marion invite screenwriter Hank Teagle over for dinner, along with Buddy and Connie. They screen one of Charlie's earlier films. When the dinner is over, Charlie pleads for Marion to stay with him. She instead leaves with Hank, who asks her to decide between him or Charlie.

Meanwhile, Smiley arrives to tell Charlie that Dixie Evans, a starlet who was riding with Charlie on the night of the accident, is threatening to disclose the truth. Smiley suggests Charlie persuade her to keep quiet and leaves just when Dixie arrives. Alone together, Charlie tries to dissuade Dixie while being sympathetic to her acting career plight. However, she is willing to confess to hurt Hoff. Shortly after, Marion returns and Dixie leaves. Charlie gives an angered monologue while Marion makes it clear she wants to repair their marriage.

Back at the studio, Hank tells Clarisse that he plans to leave Hollywood and write a new novel. Charlie returns home, where Smiley tells him that Dixie went to Hoff's office and caused such an upheaval that Hoff brutally beat her. Smiley tries to involve Charlie in a plan to murder her. With Marion now aware of Dixie's presence on the night of the accident, Charlie defies Hoff and insists that nothing happen to Dixie.

Hoff and Smiley try to exhort once more by threatening to release secret recordings between Marion and Hank. However, Charlie does not feel threatened by Hoff, to which Hoff angrily responds he will ruin Charlie. Hoff and Smiley promptly leave. Nat promises Charlie he will fight off Hoff's attempts. While Nick draws a bath for Charlie, Marion plays the rest of the recording, to which she calls Hank stating she will not divorce Charlie.

Buddy walks in, weeping, after discovering Charlie's affair with Connie. Buddy spits in Charlie's face and leaves. On his way upstairs, Charlie and Marion reaffirm their love for each other. Smiley returns to telephone Hoff and tells him that Dixie was struck dead by a bus. Marion blames Smiley and notices water dripping through the ceiling. Smiley calls the studio, dictating an obituary with lies claiming Charlie died of a heart attack.

Nick comes downstairs and blames Charlie's death on Smiley and Hoff. Hank arrives and tells Smiley that Hoff's career is finished when he reveals the truth to the press. Mourning her husband's death, Marion cries for help.

== Cast ==
- Jack Palance as Charlie Castle
- Ida Lupino as Marion Castle
- Wendell Corey as Smiley Coy
- Jean Hagen as Connie Bliss
- Rod Steiger as Stanley Shriner Hoff
- Shelley Winters as Dixie Evans
- Ilka Chase as Patty Benedict
- Everett Sloane as Nat Danziger
- Wesley Addy as Horatio "Hank" Teagle
- Paul Langton as Buddy Bliss
- Nick Dennis as Mickey Feeney
- Bill Walker as Russell
- Michael Winkelman as Billy Castle
- Strother Martin as Stillman

== Production ==
In March 1955, Aldrich signed a contract with Clifford Odets to produce the film. A script by James Poe had already been written and Jack Palance set to star. The film was produced by Aldrich's own production company.

Aldrich said in 1972 he was "terribly ambivalent about the Hoff character". When he directed the film, several of the Hollywood studio moguls were still in power.

We'd had twenty years of petty dictators running the industry, during which time everybody worked and everybody got paid, maybe not enough, but they weren't on relief. Seventeen years later you wonder if the industry is really more healthy in terms of creativity. Are we making more or better pictures without that central control? But when everybody worked under those guys, they hated them. So we took the drumroll from Nuremberg and put it under the Hoff character's entrances and exits. It wasn't too subtle... The Hoff crying came from Mayer, who is reported to have been able to cry at the drop of an option. But the big rebuff that Odets suffered was at the hands of Columbia, so there was more of Cohn in the original play than there was of Mayer.

Aldrich later said he wished he and the writer had cut down Odets' play. "At the time, I thought that kind of theatrical flavoring was extraordinary. I'm afraid neither Jim Poe nor I were tough enough in editing some of Odets' phrases as we should have been."

== Reception and legacy ==
=== Critical response ===
New York Times film critic Bosley Crowther, was disappointed and believed the plot lacked credibility. He wrote:

Actually, it looks as though The Big Knife originally was written and aimed as an angry, vituperative incident [indictment?] of the personal and professional morals of Hollywood. This is the clear implication of what is presented on the screen...But the simple fact is that Mr. Odets—and James Poe, who wrote the screen adaptation—were more disposed to extreme emotionalism than to actuality and good sense. They picture a group of sordid people jawing at one another violently. But their drama arrives at a defeatist climax. And this viewer, for one, was not convinced.

The Chicago Tribune wrote:

This tale of blackmail, intended murder, marital infidelity and eventual suicide boasts some excellent performances. It is laid in Hollywood, and Rod Steiger gives his role—that of a domineering, outwardly emotional but inwardly cold blooded producer—such conviction that it just about carries the film….The basic plot was cunningly conceived, and there are some bluntly effective scenes, but unfortunately the story is turgid with typical Odets dialog. The author seems to be in love with the sound of his verbose and often meaningless prose, and most of the characters are forced to deliver it in long and boring speeches…..The audience accepted these wordy flights stolidly, but reacted definitely to Everett Sloane as a mealy-mouthed agent, to Wendell Corey as an efficient hatchet man for the ruthless producer, and to Jean Hagen and Shelley Winters as a couple of aggressive females.

Film critic Dennis Schwartz wrote in 2004:

Robert Aldrich... directs this intelligent noirish melodrama...The film did not have a good box office according to Aldrich because the public never felt sympathetic to Palance's character and Palance himself didn't have matinee star good looks to make his part believable as a Hollywood star. No major studio would make this exposé on tinseltown, so it was made by United Artists on a low-budget and shot in 16 days...The movie stresses that the struggle is a personal one over survival and redemption rather than idealism, which allows the sparks to fly among the disagreeable leading characters as they trade lines only an insider could pen. The masterful performance by Palance as the tormented artist defies the clichés of his insulated and self-absorbed character. He expresses all his anguish and hurt in the star system he willingly signed on for to reap the benefits of the rewards, and shows the futility that boggles his mind to the point he doesn't realize when he's acting or speaking for real. It was shocking when first released in 1955 but is now considered tame by modern standards."

Film critic Jeff Stafford wrote in 2008:

[Of the previous Hollywood-exposé dramas] none...can match the negative depiction of the movie business and its power brokers offered in The Big Knife...The use of long takes by cinematographer Ernest Laszlo adds greatly to the film's claustrophobic tension and the mingling of fictitious names with real ones (Billy Wilder, Elia Kazan, William Wyler and others) throughout the dialogue gives The Big Knife a candid, almost documentary-like quality at times.

Film critic Nathan Rabin wrote in 2022:

The Big Knife is a film of excess. It's over-written, over-acted, overwrought and over-emotional. It's full of bombast and shouting and actorly monologues but the film has the courage of its convictions. It's unrelenting and unsparing in its depiction of the film industry as a hellscape where the worst of capitalism meets the worst of the arts.

Rotten Tomatoes rates the film 91% based on 11 reviews.

=== Box office ===
Aldrich later claimed that although the film cost $400,000 and made over $1 million it lost him money because the distributor took the profits.

=== Awards ===
Wins

- Venice Film Festival: Silver Lion, Robert Aldrich; 1955.

Nominations

- Venice Film Festival: Golden Lion, Robert Aldrich; 1955

=== Home media ===
The Big Knife was released to DVD by MGM Home Video on April 1, 2003, as a Region 1 widescreen DVD.

== See also ==
- List of American films of 1955
