= Vera Cruz (film) =

1954 Western film directed by Robert Aldrich

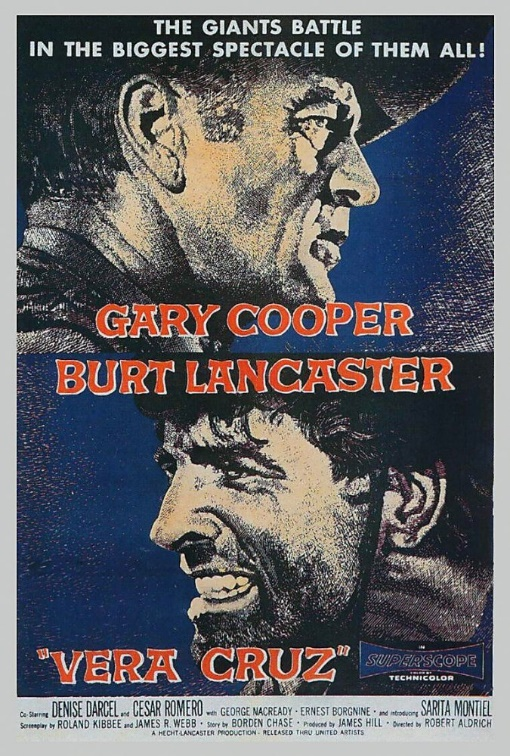
- Theatrical release poster
- Directed by: Robert Aldrich
- Screenplay by: Roland Kibbee; James R. Webb
- Story by: Borden Chase
- Produced by: James Hill
- Starring: Gary Cooper; Burt Lancaster; Denise Darcel; Cesar Romero; Sara Montiel
- Cinematography: Ernest Laszlo
- Edited by: Alan Crosland Jr.
- Music by: Hugo Friedhofer
- Production companies: Hecht-Lancaster Productions; Flora Productions
- Distributed by: United Artists
- Release date: December 25, 1954
- Running time: 94 minutes
- Country: United States
- Language: English
- Budget: $1.6 million
- Box office: $11 million (estimated)

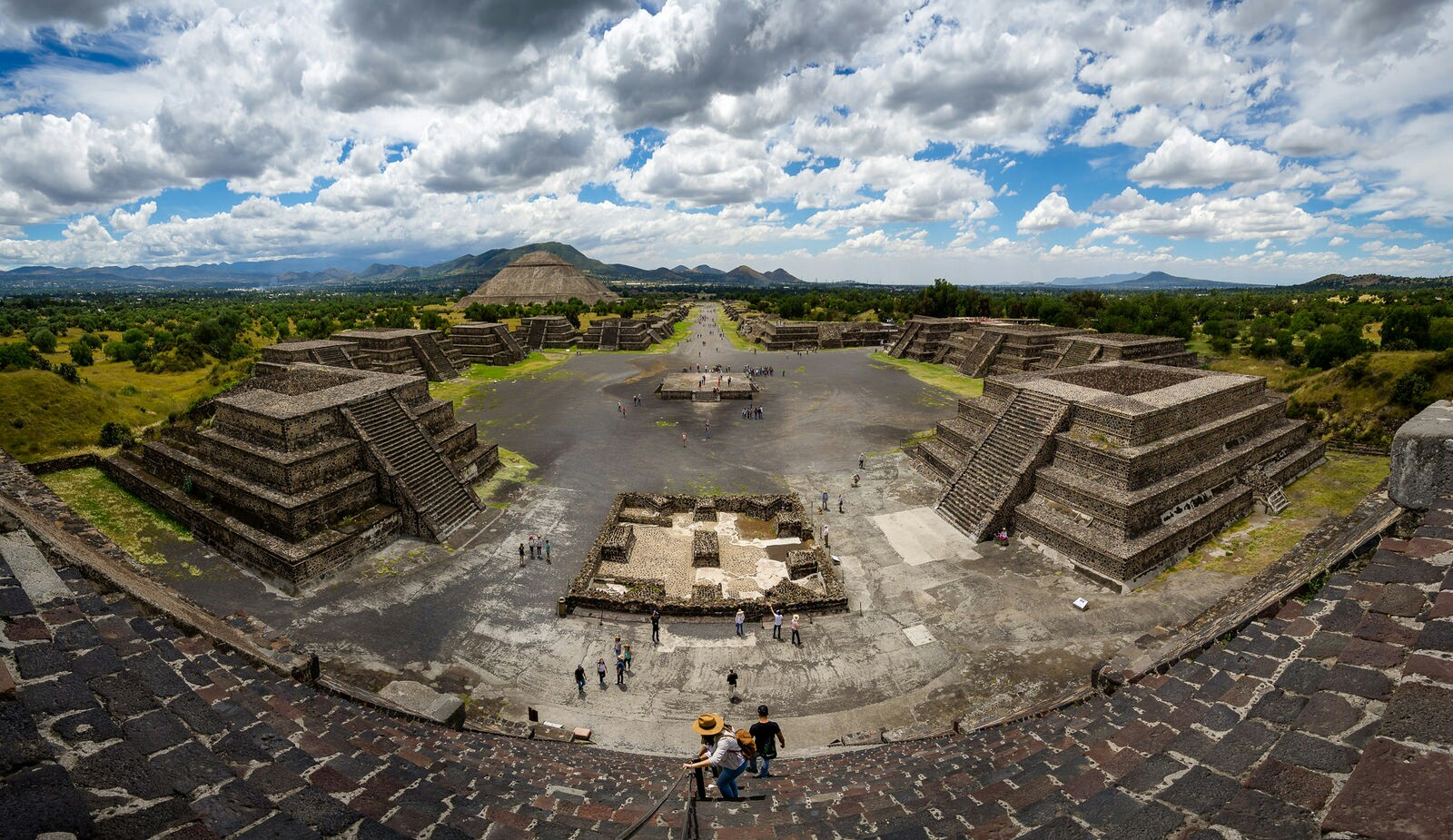
The expedition passes through the ruins of Teotihuacan.

Vera Cruz is a 1954 American Western film directed by Robert Aldrich and starring Gary Cooper and Burt Lancaster, featuring Denise Darcel, Sara Montiel, Cesar Romero, Ernest Borgnine, Charles Bronson and Jack Elam. Set during the Franco-Mexican War, the film centers on a group of American mercenaries tasked with transporting a large shipment of Imperial gold to the port of Veracruz, but begin to have second thoughts about their allegiances. It was produced by Hecht-Lancaster Productions and released by United Artists on 25 December 1954.

The picture's amoral characters and cynical attitude towards violence (including a scene where Lancaster's character threatens to murder child hostages) were considered shocking at the time and influenced future Westerns such as The Magnificent Seven (1960), The Professionals (1966), Sam Peckinpah's The Wild Bunch (1969), and the spaghetti Westerns of Sergio Leone, which often featured supporting cast members from Vera Cruz in similar roles. Its influence on Leone's work led some critics to label it "the proto-Spaghetti Western."

== Plot ==
During the Franco-Mexican War, ex-Confederate soldier Ben Trane travels to Mexico seeking a job as a mercenary. He falls in with Joe Erin, a younger gunslinger who heads a gang of cutthroats. They are recruited by Marquis Henri de Labordere for service with Emperor Maximilian. Maximilian offers them $25,000 to escort the Countess Duvarre to the city of Veracruz. Trane gets the emperor to double the offer.

During a river crossing, Trane notices that the stagecoach in which the countess is traveling is extremely heavy. Erin and Trane later discover that hidden inside are six cases of gold coins. The countess informs them that it is worth $3 million which is intended to pay for reinforcements from Europe. They form an uneasy alliance to steal and split the gold. Unknown to them, the marquis is listening from the shadows.

The Juaristas, led by General Ramírez, attack the column several times. Pickpocket and Juarista undercover agent Nina joins the convoy. When Trane, Erin and their men are surrounded by the Juaristas, Trane persuades Ramirez to join forces and agree to pay them $100,000. The marquis succeeds in getting the gold to Veracruz. In the Juarista attack, the French are defeated, but most of Erin's men are killed. Erin attempts to steal the gold for himself by getting the countess to reveal the location of the ship she had hired to transport it. He even kills one of his own men. However, Trane arrives in time to confront him. They face off in a showdown that ends in Erin's death. Trane and Nina leave, while women search the dead for their loved ones.

== Cast ==
- Gary Cooper as Ben Trane
- Burt Lancaster as Joe Erin
- Denise Darcel as Countess Marie Duvarre
- Cesar Romero as Marquis Henri de Labordere
- Sara Montiel (Note: Credited as 'Sarita Montiel'.) as Nina
- George Macready as Emperor Maximilian
- Ernest Borgnine as Donnegan
- Jack Elam as Tex
- Charles Bronson (Note: Credited as 'Charles Buchinsky'.) as Pittsburgh
- Morris Ankrum as General Ramírez
- Henry Brandon as Captain Danette
- Jack Lambert as Charlie
- James McCallion as Little-Bit
- James Seay as Abilene
- Archie Savage as Ballard
- Charles Horvath as Reno
- Juan García as Pedro
- Fernando Wagner as Imperial Officer

== Production ==
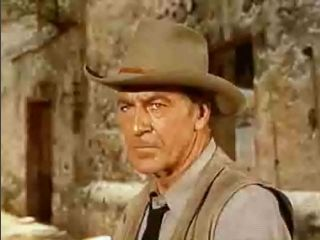
Gary Cooper as Trane

Burt Lancaster and Harold Hecht had just signed a contract with United Artists to make two films, starting with Apache, also directed by Robert Aldrich. Just before filming on that movie began in October 1953, Lancaster announced their second film would be Vera Cruz with himself and Gary Cooper, based on a story by Borden Chase.

In December 1953, after Apache finished filming, Lancaster announced Aldrich would direct Vera Cruz.

United Artists were so happy with Apache they changed the two-picture deal with Hecht and Lancaster into a two-year deal covering seven films.

=== Casting ===
Before taking the role of Ben Trane, Gary Cooper was advised by Clark Gable not to work with Burt Lancaster, fearing the younger actor would upstage him.

Mari Blanchard was meant to play the female lead and Hecht signed to borrow her from Universal. However, there was a clause forbidding her to appear on television which Hecht disagreed with. Instead they cast Denise Darcel. Mamie Van Doren claimed in her autobiography Playing the Field that Lancaster interviewed her for the role of the Countess, but she lost the part after refusing to sleep with him.

This film marks the last time Charles Bronson was billed under his original name, 'Charles Buchinsky'. From this point onward, he would always be credited by his more well-known stage name.

=== Shooting ===
Filming started in February 1954. Vera Cruz was the first American film production to be shot entirely in Mexico. Though set in the city of Veracruz, the majority of the film was actually shot in and around Cuernavaca. Exterior shots were filmed at Chapultepec Castle in Mexico City, the ruins of Teotihuacan, and the climax was shot at Molino de Flores Nezahualcóyotl National Park in Texcoco de Mora. The interiors were filmed at Estudios Churubusco.

Vera Cruz was also the first production to use the SuperScope widescreen process, which was designed to achieve anamorphic prints from standard flat 35mm negatives. Shot at a conventional 1.37:1 aspect ratio, the film was cropped to 2:1 in post-production, given a CinemaScope-compatible (2x) squeeze, and blown up to normal frame height.

Aldrich and Lancaster got along well on Apache but as to Vera Cruz, the director said "we probably had a less amicable relationship than we anticipated. This was because Burt, until he directed The Kentuckian, thought he was going to be a director and when you're directing your first great big picture you don't welcome somebody else on hand with directorial notions. There were a few differences of opinion about concepts and about action." Lancaster recalled that Cooper demanded rewrites to his character to make him less morally-gray and more conventionally heroic.

According to Eli Wallach, the Mexican authorities were appalled at the unflattering depiction of their country, so any subsequent Hollywood productions (including The Magnificent Seven) were thoroughly overseen by state censors.

== Reception ==
The film earned an estimated $5 million at the North American box office during its first run and $9 million overall.

In 1963, Aldrich announced he was working on a sequel There Really Was a Gold Mine but it was never made.

== Legacy ==
Critic and historian Dave Kehr would later cite Vera Cruz as one of the most influential films of the 1950s, inspiring later Westerns by such directors as Sam Peckinpah and especially Sergio Leone. Kehr also praised Cooper and Lancaster's performances in the film, writing that "the generational transition from an aging star to his up-and-coming replacement has seldom been handled with better humor or more biting wit."

In 1975 Ganes T.H., one of the leading Indonesian comic artists of the era, adapted the story into a comic titled Petualang ("The Adventurer"). The setting was moved to post-Java War (1825–30), and the ending was adjusted accordingly.

== See also ==
- You Can't Win 'Em All, a 1970 film with a similar plot set in the Greco-Turkish War.
- P.O.W. The Escape, a 1986 film with a similar plot set in the Vietnam War.
