= Take My Life (1942 film) =

1942 film by Leo C. Popkin

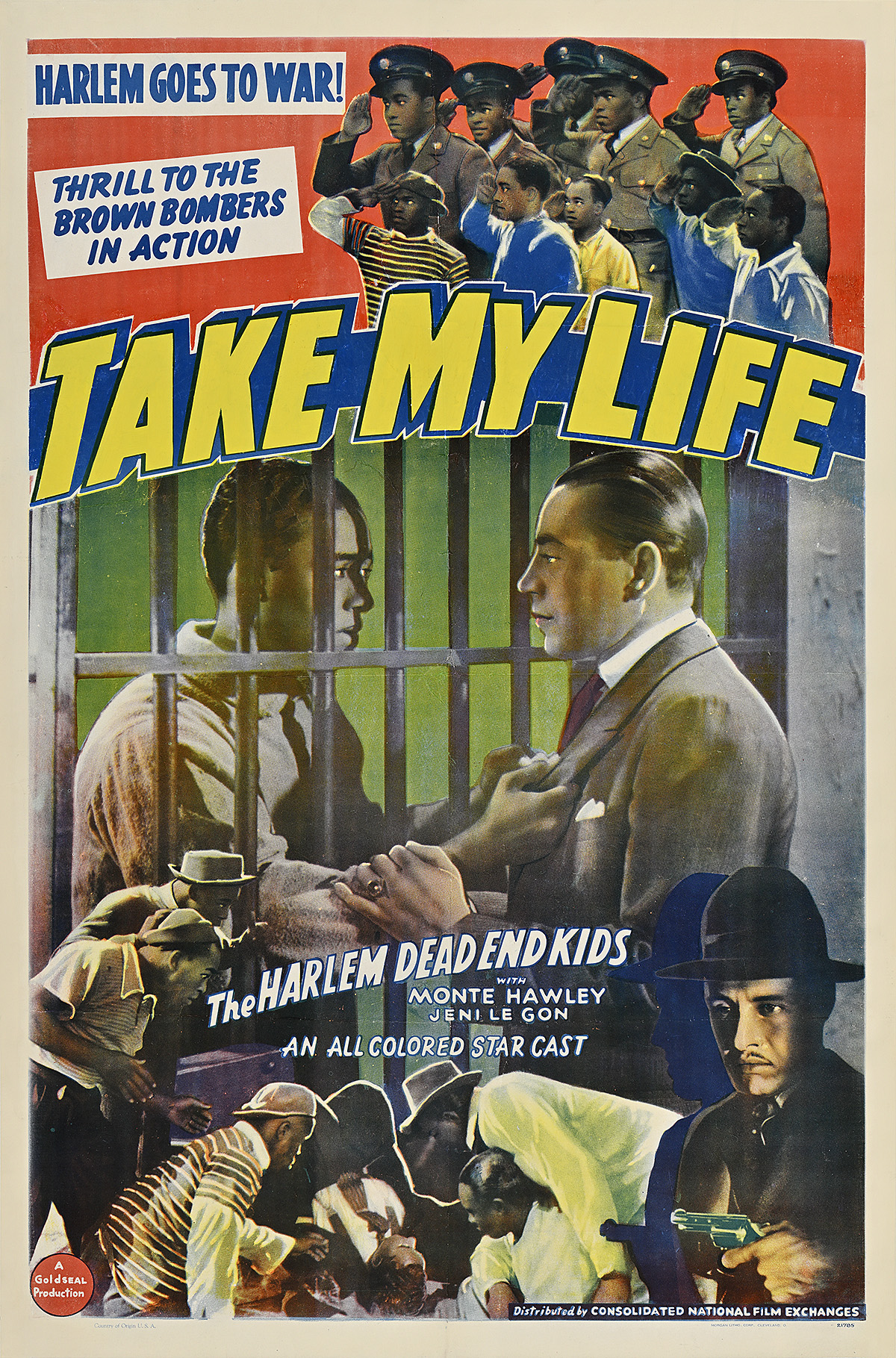
- Poster for the original theatrical release
- Directed by: Leo C. Popkin
- Screenplay by: Edward Dewey; Billie Myers
- Story by: Billie Myers
- Produced by: Clifford Sanforth
- Starring: Monte Hawley; Jeni LeGon; Arthur Ray; Freddie Jackson
- Cinematography: Clark Ramsey
- Edited by: Martion G. Cohn
- Production company: Million Dollar Productions
- Distributed by: State Rights
- Release date: 1942
- Running time: 70 minutes
- Country: United States
- Language: English

Take My Life is an American film released in 1942. It featured a group of young actors known as the Harlem Tuff Kids but billed in this film as the Harlem Dead End Kids. In this film they join the U.S. Army. The group also appeared in the 1939 film Reform School. Both were produced by Million Dollar Productions. Oakton Community College has a poster for the film in its collection. The poster includes the taglines Harlem Goes to War! and Thrill to the Brown Bombers in Action.

Toddy Pictures re-released the film later the same year as Murder Rap. The film premiered at the Apollo Theater in Harlem.

== Cast ==
- Monte Hawley as Dr. Thurman
- Jeni LeGon as Helen Stanley
- Arthur Ray
- Freddie Jackson as Johnny
- Eugene Jackson as Bill
- Harry Levette
- Jack Carr as Sgt. Holmes
- Paul White as Icky
