= Louise Franklin =

American dancer and actress (fl. 1935–1958)

- Born: December 7, 1917; Kansas City, Missouri, U.S.
- Died: July 26, 1992 (aged 74); Los Angeles, California, U.S.
- Other names: Beau, Bo
- Occupations: Actress, Dancer
- Years active: 1935–1958
- Spouse: Lee Young
- Children: 1
- Mother: Viola Franklin

Louise Franklin (December 7, 1917 – July 26, 1992), nicknamed Beau and Bo, was an American dancer and actress active during the 1930s, 1940s, and 1950s. From childhood, she was interested in various forms of dance and also practiced acting before starring in vaudeville roles with Bryon Ellis as the duo "Bryon and Beau". Her subsequent film roles primarily featured her dancing in various productions, both in media and on stage, and she occasionally starred as a well-dressed and well-spoken love interest to the male lead, such as when cast alongside Eddie "Rochester" Anderson.

== Career ==
Born in Kansas City, Missouri, to mother Viola Franklin, Franklin was involved in multiple areas of dance as a child, including ballet and tap dancing, along with taking acting classes.

Her vaudeville career saw her partner with Bryon Ellis under the name "Bryon and Beau" after having been a member of the Cotton Club Cuties chorus group. Her 1935 theatre role in School Days alongside Dickie Walker had the California Eagle refer to the pair's performance as akin to Aurora Greely and Leroy Broomfield. That same year she signed onto Maceo Burch's Kansas City theatre company and was said to "possibly be called the leader of the group" by the California Eagle due to her talents as an entertainer. After the company toured in California, she stayed and played in a number of film and stage roles in the following years. Harry Levette in the California Eagle said she was "Hollywood's prettiest, cleverest, most personable dancer". In 1943 during World War II, she reportedly joined the Women's Army Auxiliary Corps, though this was denied by her husband.

After Dorothy Dandridge was injured in a car accident, Franklin had to fill in for her primary dancing role in the 1945 film Pillar to Post in extended music scenes in order to conceal the cuts between the two actresses. Her cast role as Rochester's girlfriend in Brewster's Millions after her previous high profile acting roles had the director praise her as a "real find". As bonus for her acting quality in the 1945 film Crime Incorporated, the director gifted her with a box of then expensive cigarettes from Franklin's favorite brand after she completed her final scene.

She continued her tours with Bryon Ellis under the "Bryon and Beau" name in 1948, doing a theatre tour across the Eastern United States in late August of that year. She was cast as Louise Ritchie in the 1949 film Look-Out Sister alongside Louis Jordan and was noted by the Alabama Tribune as being "one of the screen's best dancers". Lloyd Binford, film censor for Memphis, Tennessee, banned films showing Franklin and Eddie "Rochester" Anderson from the city because he disliked African Americans being portrayed as "well-dressed, intelligent acting sweethearts" in films. She competed in the 1954 Miss Brew 102 competition and, while not victorious, received attention and more television acting opportunities afterwards.

== Filmography ==
- Bright Road (1953) - Teacher at Meeting (uncredited)
- Skirts Ahoy! (1952) - Black Drill Team Member (uncredited)
- Look-Out Sister (1949) - Louise Ritchie
- Choo Choo Train (Swing) (1948)
- Ziegfeld Follies (1945)
- Ghost of the Vampire (1945) - Caba
- Strange Illusion (1945)
- Crime Incorporated (1945)
- The Negro Sailor (1945)
- Pillar To Post (1945) - Louis Armstrong band's Dancer
- Brewster's Millions (1945) - Rochester's Girlfriend
- Carolina Blues (1944) - Dancer (uncredited)
- Hollywood Canteen (1944)
- Atlantic City (1944) - Bathing Beauty (uncredited)
- Thank Your Lucky Stars (1943) - Dancer in 'Ice Cold Katy' (uncredited)
- Stormy Weather (1943) - Dancer (uncredited)
- Hers to Hold (1943) - Defense Plant Worker (uncredited)
- Cabin in the Sky (1943) - Dancer (uncredited)
- Crazy House (1943)
- Pardon My Sarong (1942)
- Take My Life (1942) - Nurse
- Road to Morocco (1942)
- Star Spangled Rhythm (1942) - Dancer in 'Sharp as a Tack' (uncredited)
- Road to Zanzibar (1941)
- Citizen Kane (1941) - Susan's maid (uncredited)
- Lady Luck (1940) - Second Waitress
- Four Shall Die (1940) - Nurse
- One Dark Night (1939) - Nurse
- The Duke Is Tops (1938) - Chorus Girl Dancer (uncredited)

== Theatre ==
- Sweet and Hot (1958)
- Two In A Bed (1946)
- Harlem To Hollywood (1943)
- Jump for Joy (1941)
- School Days (1935)

== Personal life ==
Franklin was married to singer and jazz drummer Lee Young, and they had a son together.
