= While Thousands Cheer =

- Directed by: Leo C. Popkin
- Written by: Joseph O'Donnell
- Produced by: Sara Francis; Harry M. Popkin; Clifford Sanforth
- Cinematography: Marcel Le Picard; Herman Schopp
- Edited by: Martin G. Cohn
- Distributed by: Million Dollar Productions
- Release date: 1940
- Country: United States
- Language: English

While Thousands Cheer is a 1940 American lost film. Leo C. Popkin directed. It was the only football-themed film with an African American lead character for decades. It starred Kenny Washington, a football star from UCLA who went on to become the first African American in the NFL after initially being refused an opportunity to play in the league due to segregation.

== Plot ==
The film is a football melodrama. The plot was said to be based on true stories about gambling and corruption in football at a specific Black college. The story follows a star football player and his brother as they get involved with, and later break up, a gambling ring's attempting to "fix" a college game.

== Cast ==
The film featured a mostly African American cast, including UCLA football star Kenny Washington, who was denied entry to the segregated NFL for several years. The film was Washington's first movie role. Jeni Le Gon played the leading actress.

- Kenny Washington as Kenny Harrington
- Mantan Moreland as Nash
- Pete Webster as Downey
- Jeni Le Gon as Myra
- Reginald Fenderson as Phil Harrington
- Lawrence Criner as Green
- Monte Hawley as Johnson
- Florence O'Brien as Daisy
- Ida Belle Kauffin as Rose
- Bud Harris as Coach Harding
- Earl Hall as Jerry Stevens
- John Thomas as Jack Saunders/Spike
- Reginald Anderson as Umpire
- Jack Spears as Referee
- Alfred Grant as Radio announcer
- Edward Thompson (actor) as Ransom

== Production ==
The film was produced by Clifford Sanforth and Million Dollar Pictures. The premiere date was moved back due to requests from theatre managers that the film be released around the same time as other football films, to "get the minds of the public on football" and increase attendance at the theatres.

== Reception ==
The film was praised in a review by the Hollywood Daily Variety. The Cleveland Call and Post called it "one of the most exciting, interest holding pictures ever filmed to entertain the young and old, male and female, of all races."
