= Up Jumped the Devil (disambiguation) =

Up Jumped the Devil is a 1941 film.

Up Jumped the Devil may also refer to:

- Up Jumped the Devil (album), a 1977 album by John Davis and the Monster Orchestra
- "Up Jumped the Devil", a track on the Nick Cave and the Bad Seeds album Tender Prey
