= Neva Peoples =

Singer and dancer

Neva Mary Peoples was a singer and dancer who appeared in several films in the United States. She performed as a singer, dancer, and chorus girl.

Peoples was from San Francisco. A 1936 news clipping refers to her as the "colored blues singer and dancer from Frank Sebastian's Cotton Club in Hollywood." Her film debut was in the 1938 melodrama Gang Smashers singing "That's What You Get in Harlem". She played Ella in The Duke is Tops (1938). She was in a cabaret scene in the 1939 movie, One Dark Night. A 1942 photograph captured her and fellow performers in zoot suit costumes for the Republic Studio film, Hit Parade of 1943.

She married Phil Moore in 1937 and had a son, George Phillip Moore III, in 1939. Moore's orchestra backed one of her performances.

== Filmography ==
- Gang Smashers (1938)
- The Duke is Tops (1938) as Ella
- Hit Parade of 1943
- Mantan Messes Up (1946)
