= Polygamy (disambiguation) =

Polygamy is the practice of marrying multiple spouses.

Polygamy may also refer to:

- Polygamy (film), an American film that premiered in 1937
- Polygamy (horse) (1971–1977), a British Thoroughbred race horse
- The Polygamist, a 2026 South African TV series

== See also ==
- Polygyny, a form of polygamy that entails the marriage of a man to at least two or more women at the same time
