= Eddie Green (actor) =

American actor (1896–1950)

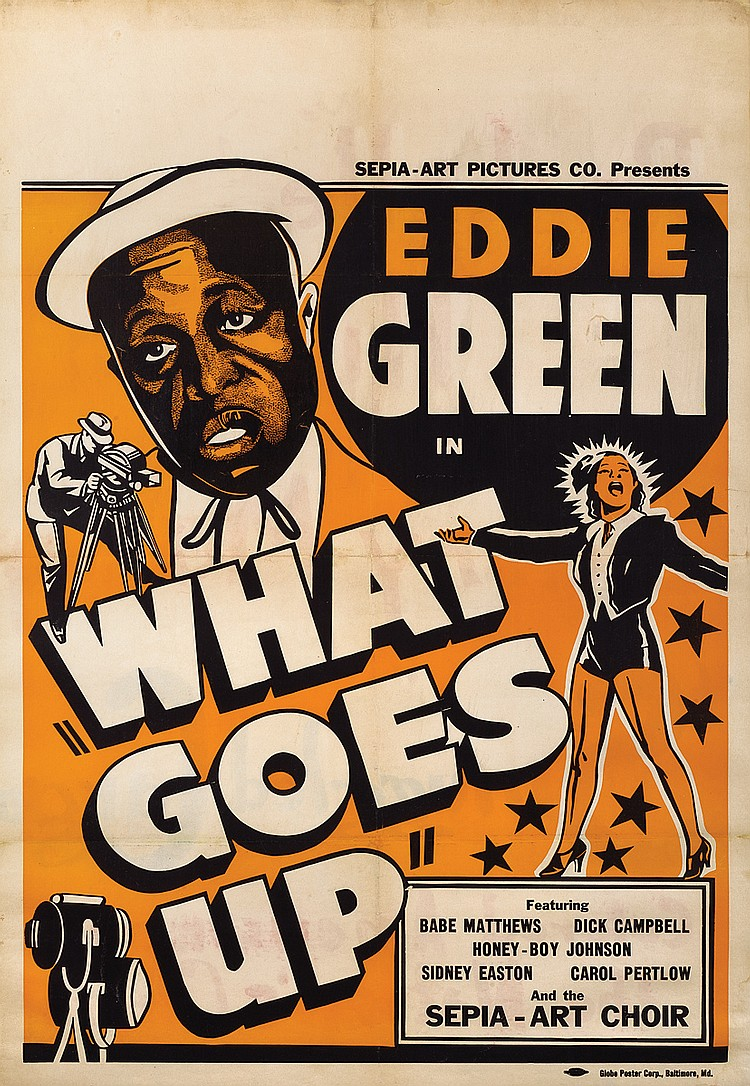
Poster for the film What Goes Up (1939)

Eddie Green (August 16, 1896 – September 19, 1950) was an American actor, film director, composer, and radio personality best known for his vocal work in the radio programs Amos 'n' Andy, and Duffy's Tavern.

== Early life and career ==
Eddie Green was born on August 16, 1896, in Baltimore, Maryland. Before age eight, he had already gained a reputation in local show business circles by performing as a "boy magician" in Baltimore area churches. As he grew into his teen years, he started to gain employment in local concert halls as a magician before breaking into the vaudeville circuit, where he made nine dollars a week. Early in his vaudeville career, Green began to branch out from magic and work in burlesque acts. For eleven years, Green worked with the legendary vaudeville company headed by Billy Minsky, Minsky's Burlesque.

== Move to Broadway and film ==
Green left Minsky in the late 1920s and moved to New York City in 1929. His first major role was in the Broadway production of Hot Chocolates, a black musical review where he performed with the likes of James Baskett and Louis "Satchmo" Armstrong. Green would also go on to perform in Blackberries of 1932 (for which he wrote the book), A Woman's A Fool to be Clever, and The Hot Mikado.

As the age of the "talking pictures" began, Green participated in creating what would later be known as the "race pictures". Green was involved in many film productions, namely; Mr. Adams Bomb, Laff Jamboree, and Mantan Messes Up. Through his film career, he was noticed by famous radio personality Rudy Vallée, who convinced him to move to radio.

== Songs ==
Green wrote many songs, the best known being "A Good Man Is Hard to Find."

== Work in radio ==
Vallée featured Green heavily on his radio programs The Fleischmann's Yeast Hour, The Royal Gelatin Hour, and Sealtest Dairy Show. He also worked during the 1930s and 1940s with his old friend Louis Armstrong in his variety series where he would perform sketches with Gee Gee James. Some other major radio programs Green appeared on were Maxwell House Show Boat, The Philco Radio Hall of Fame, and Jubilee.

However, Green did not gain his highest acclaim until he began to work with Amos 'n' Andy and Duffy's Tavern, the latter of which also became a hit movie. Through his work with Ed Gardner he became one of the most influential black artists in radio.

Eddie Green died of a heart ailment on September 19, 1950, in Los Angeles.

== Filmography ==
- Sending a Wire (1929) with James Baskett
- The Devil’s Parade (1930)
- What Goes Up (1939)
- Dress Rehearsal (1939)
- Comes Midnight (1940)
- One Round Jones (1941), short boxing comedy
- Duffy's Tavern (1945) (based on Duffy's Tavern radio show)
- Eddie Green's Laugh Jamboree (1947), Toddy Pictures, a film featuring re-edited versions of Eddie Green's earlier film releases
- Mantan Messes Up (1946)
- Mr. Adam's Bomb (1949)
