= Gun moll (disambiguation) =

A gun moll is the female companion of a male professional criminal.

Gun moll may also refer to:

- Gang Smashers, 1938 American film also released under the name Gun Moll
- Sex Pot (1975 film), Italian film also released under the name Gun Moll
