= Eugene Jackson =

American actor (1916–2001)

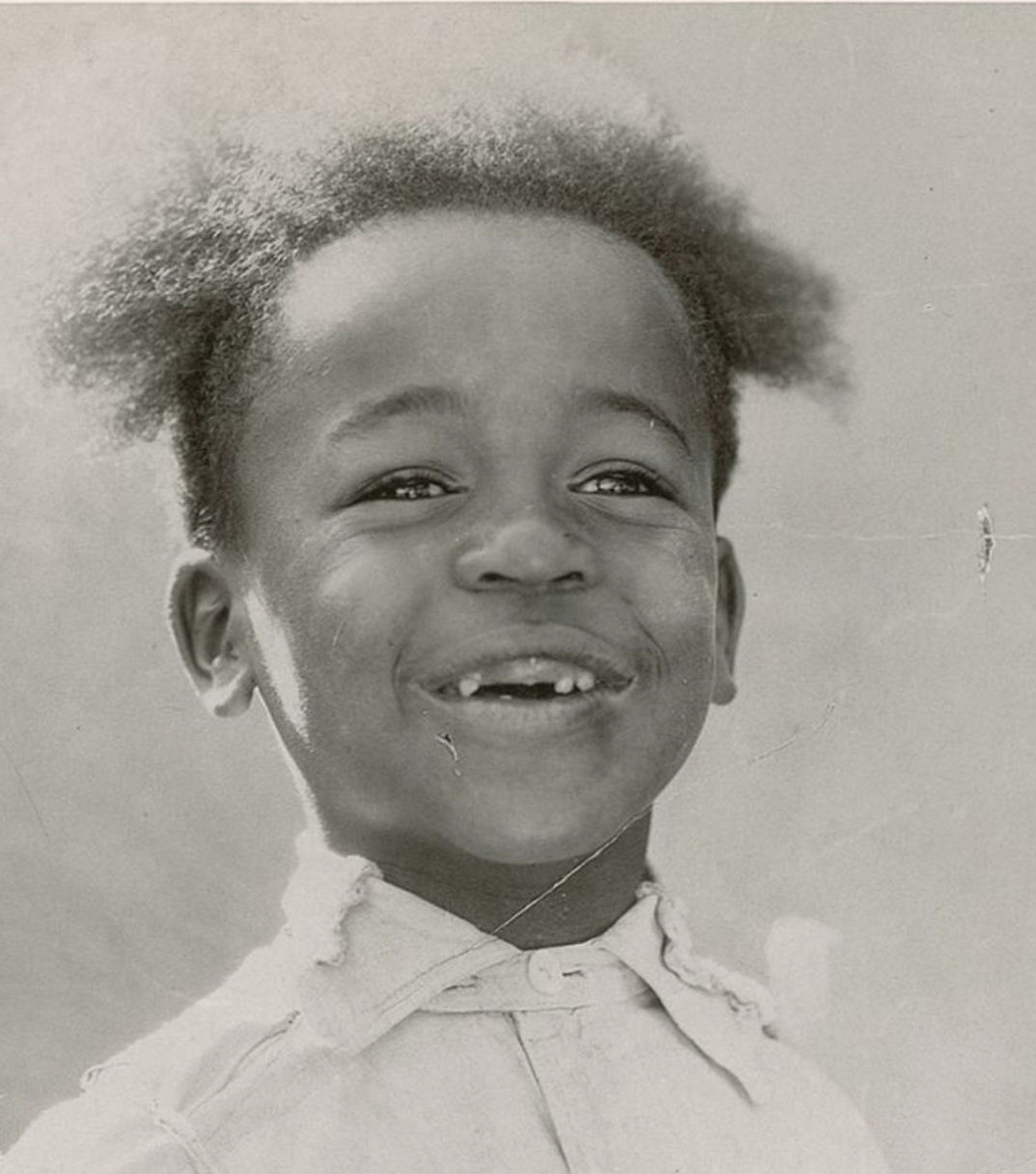
- Jackson in 1924
- Born: December 25, 1916; Buffalo, New York, U.S.
- Died: October 26, 2001 (aged 84); Compton, California, U.S.
- Occupation: Actor
- Years active: 1918–1991
- Spouse: Sue Jackson (m. 1946)

Eugene W. Jackson II (December 25, 1916 – October 26, 2001) was an American child actor who was a regular of the Our Gang short series during the silent Pathé era.

== Career ==
When he joined the gang, Jackson replaced the series' first black cast member, Ernie Morrison who was billed in the series as Sunshine Sammy, Jackson's characters nickname was "Pineapple" because of his haircut's similarity to the shape of the pineapple fruit.

He played the character "Humidor" in one of Mary Pickford's most successful films, Little Annie Rooney (1925). A large film poster of the cast of Little Annie Rooney, including Jackson, hangs in the lobby of the Mary Pickford Theatre of the Academy of Motion Picture Arts and Sciences in Hollywood.

Jackson also starred in Hearts in Dixie (1929), one of the first all-talking, big-studio productions to boast a predominately African-American cast. He was the first African-American child to have a speaking part in a major motion picture.

In television, Jackson was a recurring character on Julia, the first network sitcom to have a female African-American lead, Diahann Carroll. Jackson played Julia's uncle.

Jackson's last major feature film was The Addams Family (1991) with Anjelica Huston, Raul Julia and Christopher Lloyd. He played a one-armed musician.

Jackson wrote an autobiography in 1999 that contains pictures from his career in show business.

He had a son Gene Jackson (who appeared in Shenandoah) who he is sometimes confused with.

== Death ==
Jackson died of a heart attack in Compton, California on October 26, 2001. He was 84.

== Partial filmography ==
- Penrod and Sam (1923) - Verman
- Her Reputation (1923) - Boy pushed into pond
- Boy of Mine (1923) - Little Boy (uncredited)
- The Thief of Bagdad (1924) - Child (uncredited)
- Little Annie Rooney (1925) - Humidor (uncredited)
- Flirty Four-Flushers (1926, Short) - Boy Eating Watermelon (uncredited)
- Uncle Tom's Cabin (1927) - Child (uncredited)
- Little Mickey Grogan (1927) - Dancing Black Boy (uncredited)
- Hearts in Dixie (1929) - Chinquapin
- Dixiana (1930) - Cupid - Plantation House Boy (uncredited)
- Cimarron (1931) - Isaiah
- Sporting Blood (1931) - Sam "Sammy"
- Sporting Chance (1931) - Horseshoe
- Secret Service (1931) - Israel Polk
- Ladies Crave Excitement (1935) - Lightcrust - Horse Groom (uncredited)
- Tumbling Tumbleweeds (1935) - Eightball
- Red River Valley (1936) - Iodine
- The Lonely Trail (1936) - Harmonica Player / Dancer
- Hearts in Bondage (1936) - Sam (uncredited)
- Guns and Guitars (1936) - Eightball
- Midnight Court (1937) - Garfield Brown (uncredited)
- It Can't Last Forever (1937) - Jackson Brothers Act (uncredited)
- Blonde Trouble (1937) - Bootblack (uncredited)
- Wine, Women and Horses (1937) - Eight Ball
- Thoroughbreds Don't Cry (1937) - Black Stable Boy (uncredited)
- The Buccaneer (1938) - James Smith, a Servant
- Arrest Bulldog Drummond (1938) - Hotel Page Boy (uncredited)
- Tom Sawyer, Detective (1938) - Boy (uncredited)
- Kentucky (1938) - Jimmy (uncredited)
- Rhythm Rodeo (1938) - Tap Dancer
- The Lady's from Kentucky (1939) - Winfield (uncredited)
- Reform School (1939) - Pete
- Boy Friend (1939) - Porter (uncredited)
- Television Spy (1939) - Tommy (uncredited)
- The Honeymoon's Over (1939) - Parking Man (uncredited)
- Seventeen (1940) - Attendant (uncredited)
- Sporting Blood (1940) - Sam - Lockwood's Horse Groom (uncredited)
- Melody and Moonlight (1940) - Dancer (uncredited)
- Golden Hoofs (1941) - Curly (uncredited)
- Unfinished Business (1941) - Bootblack (uncredited)
- Reap the Wild Wind (1942) - Dr. Jepson's Black Servant (uncredited)
- Take My Life (1942) - Bill, Harlem Tuff-Kid Gang Member
- Reveille with Beverly (1943) - Franklin Delano Lincoln Van Buren Jones (uncredited)
- What's Buzzin', Cousin? (1943) - Bellboy (uncredited)
- Scudda Hoo! Scudda Hay! (1948) - Stable Hand - Tony (uncredited)
- The Story of Seabiscuit (1949) - Stablehand (uncredited)
- The Killer That Stalked New York (1950) - Bootblack (uncredited)
- Artists and Models (1955) - Street Saxophonist (uncredited)
- The Long, Hot Summer (1958) - Waiter (uncredited)
- King Creole (1958) - Saxophonist in Blue Shade (uncredited)
- North by Northwest (1959) - Security Guard at auction (uncredited)
- The Gene Krupa Story (1959) - Saxophone Player (uncredited)
- The Apartment (1960) - Office Worker (uncredited)
- Two Weeks in Another Town (1962) - Commuter at Airport (uncredited)
- Critic's Choice (1963) - Audience Member (uncredited)
- Robin and the 7 Hoods (1964) - Congregation Member (uncredited)
- Looking for Love (1964) - Office Worker (uncredited)
- Your Cheatin' Heart (1964) - Theatre Patron (uncredited)
- Zebra in the Kitchen (1965) - Newsboy (uncredited)
- Wild in the Streets (1968) - Congressman (uncredited)
- Support Your Local Gunfighter (1971) - Waiter Aboard Train (uncredited)
- Chandler (1971) - Shoe Shine Boy
- The Carey Treatment (1972) - Doctor (uncredited)
- Black Girl (1972) - Parishioner (uncredited)
- Coffy (1973) - Man at Rally (uncredited)
- 40 Carats (1973) - Party Dancer (uncredited)
- Cleopatra Jones (1973) - Henry
- The Day of the Locust (1975) - Doorman (uncredited)
- All the President's Men (1976) - Reporter (uncredited)
- Sparkle (1976) - Hotel Bellboy (uncredited)
- Treasure of Matecumbe (1976) - Man Dancing in the Street (uncredited)
- Five Days from Home (1978) - Inmate (uncredited)
- Escape from Alcatraz (1979) - Inmate #7
- American Gigolo (1980) - Bootblack
- Off the Wall (1983) - Old Black Man
- Swing Shift (1984) - Bartender at Kelly's
- Life Stinks (1991) - Office Janitor (uncredited)
- The Addams Family (1991) - One-Armed Bass Player

== Bibliography ==
- Holmstrom, John. The Moving Picture Boy: An International Encyclopaedia from 1895 to 1995, Norwich, Michael Russell, 1996, pp. 74–75.
