= Fight That Ghost =

American horror film

- Directed by: Sam Newfield
- Written by: Sam Newfield; Ted Toddy
- Produced by: Ted Toddy
- Starring: Pigmeat Markham; Percy Verwayne
- Cinematography: Jack Etra
- Edited by: Elmer J. McGovern
- Production company: Toddy Pictures Company
- Distributed by: Toddy Pictures Company
- Release date: 1946
- Running time: 60 minutes
- Country: United States
- Language: English

Fight That Ghost is a 1946 feature horror comedy film. It is considered one of the earliest horror films with an all Black cast. It was directed by Sam Newfield. It was a Toddy Pictures Company release. Bill Dillard portrayed Jim Brown in the film. The film includes the songs "Take me" by Porter Grainger as well as "Hard Luck Blues" and "A Brown Skin Gal is the Best Gal After All" by John Murray.

It was one of several films Newfield directed for Toddy including Harlem on the Prairie, Mantan Messes Up, and House-Rent Party. Photo stills for the film exist.

== Cast ==
- Pigmeat "Alamo" Markham as Pigmeat [Markham]
- John "Rastus" Murray as Shorty
- Percy Verwayne as Moneybags Jim
- David Bethea as Mr. Cook
- Alberta Pryne as Sweet Sue
- Bill Dillard as Jim Brown
