= Gang Smashers =

American film

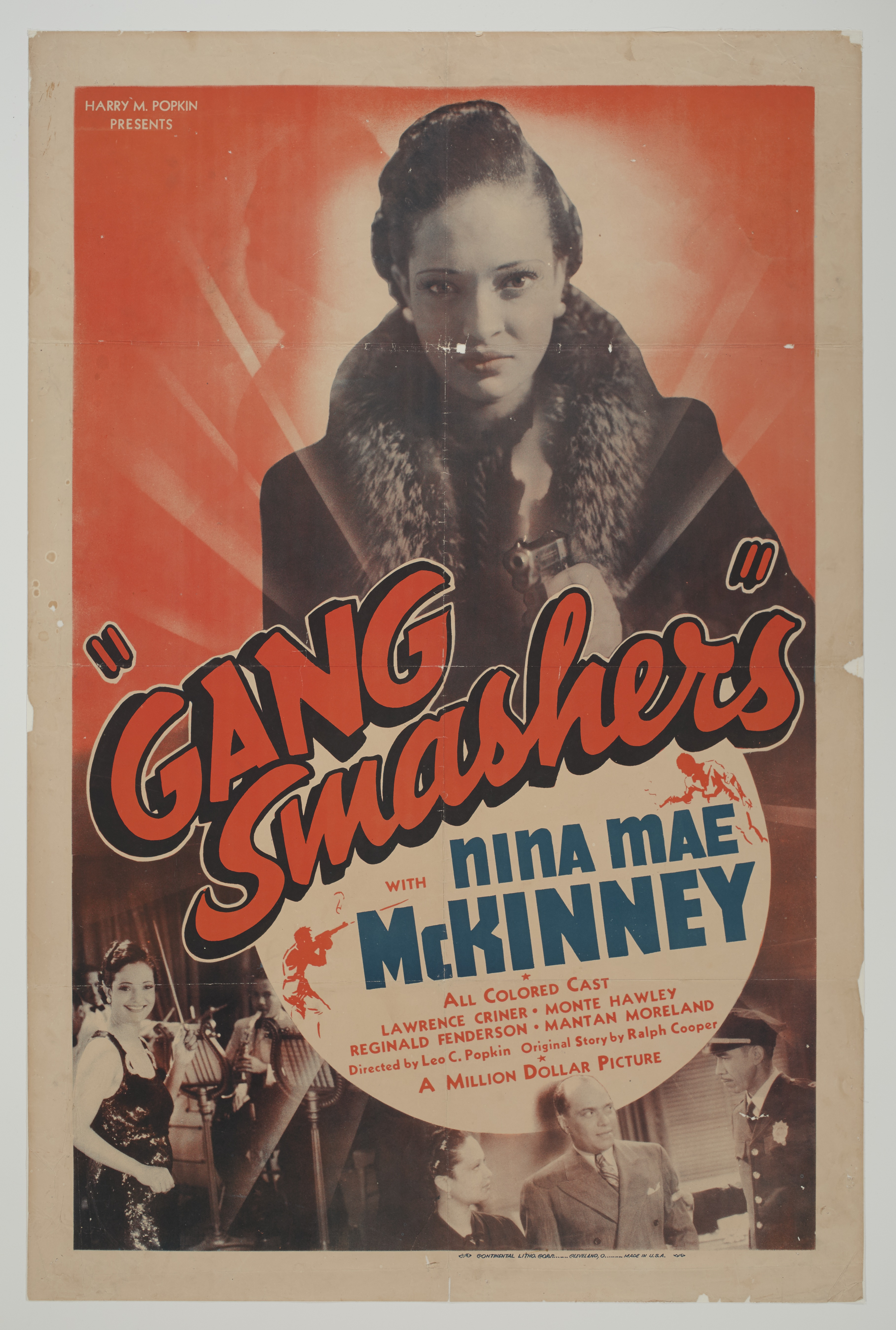
- 1938 Poster
- Directed by: Leo C. Popkin
- Story by: Ralph Cooper
- Produced by: Harry M. Popkin
- Starring: Nina Mae McKinney; Lawrence Criner; Monte Hawley; Reginald Fenderson; Mantan Moreland
- Production company: Million Dollar Productions
- Distributed by: Toddy Pictures Company
- Release date: 1938
- Country: USA
- Language: English

Gang Smashers, also released as Gun Moll, is an American film released in 1938. It features an African American cast. Leo C. Popkin directed the Million Dollar Productions film from a screenplay by Ralph Cooper. The University of South Carolina libraries have an 8-page pressbook for the film. Nina Mae McKinney stars in the film a thriller about the Harlem underworld and racketeering.

The opening of the film is a dedication to African Americans in law enforcement signed by Harry M. Popkin.

== Cast ==
- Nina Mae McKinney
- Laurence Criner
- Monte Hawley
- Mantan Moreland
- Reginald Fenderson
- Eddie Thompson
- Neva Peoples, performing a song
