= Dorothy Dare =

American actress (1911–1981)

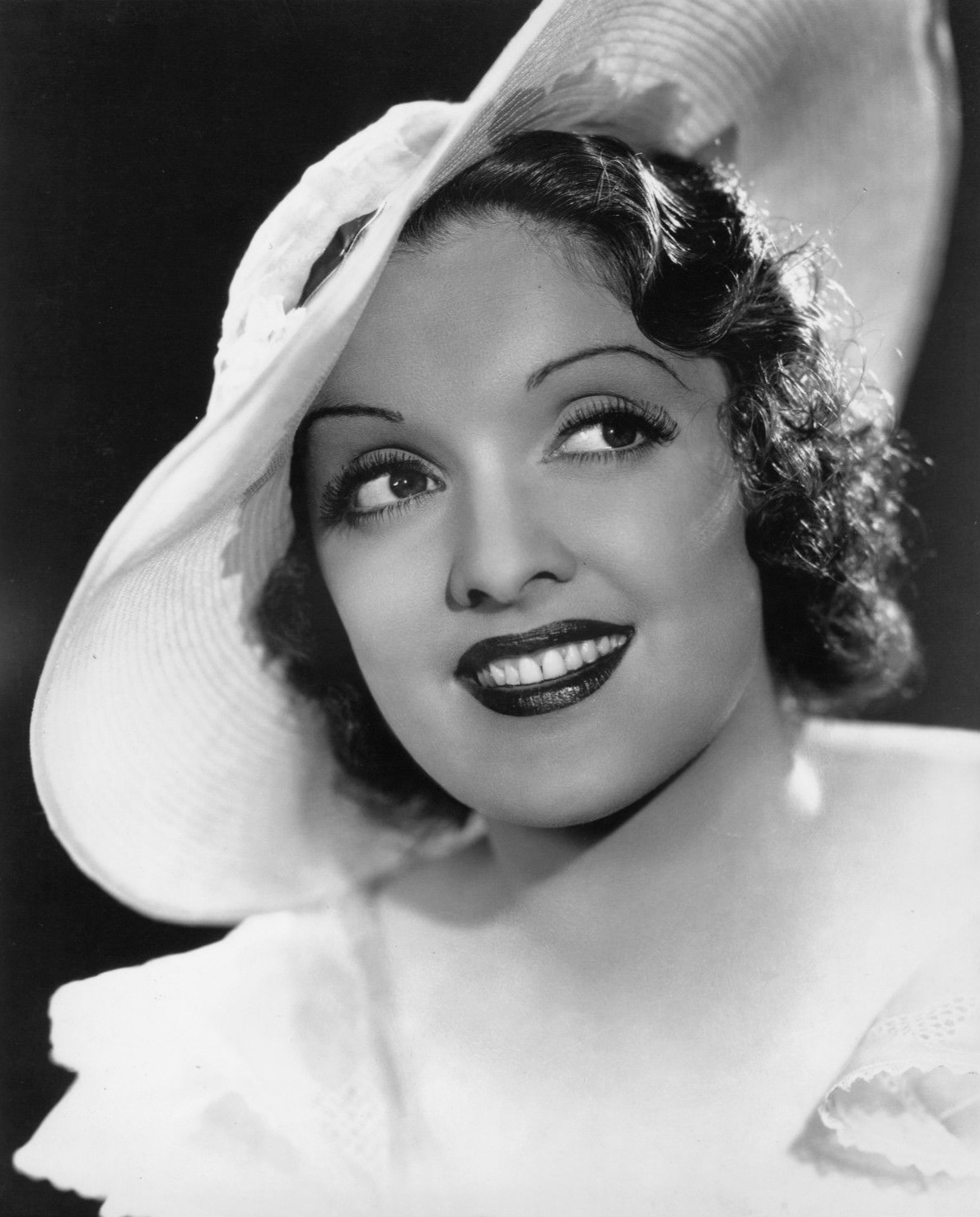
- Dare in 1934
- Born: Dorothy Herskind; August 6, 1911; Philadelphia, Pennsylvania, U.S.
- Died: October 4, 1981 (aged 70); Orange County, California, U.S.
- Resting place: Pacific View Memorial Park, U.S.
- Occupations: Actress, singer
- Years active: 1918–1944
- Spouse: John L. Van Dam (m. 1942)

Dorothy Dare (born Dorothy Herskind, August 6, 1911 – October 4, 1981) was an American actress and singer.

== Life ==
Dare was born in Philadelphia, Pennsylvania. As a child, she often sang in church and developed a strong vocal ability. She first appeared on stage at the age of seven.

She appeared in Vitaphone shorts. By 1934 she was under contract to Warner Bros. Studios and made her debut in Very Close Veins (1934). During the 1930s, she starred in a string of successful films such as Gold Diggers of 1935, Front Page Woman (1935), High Hat (1937), and Clothes and the Woman (1937). She sang such songs as "Red Headed and Blue" and "Yoo Hoo Hoo." By the late 1930s and early 1940s, Dare began to lose parts. In 1942, she made her final film appearance as Peggy in The Yanks Are Coming, and in 1944 she sang her last musical number in Musical Movieland.

Dare left movies and moved to Orange County, California. She seldom granted interviews or wrote about her Hollywood years.

=== Death ===
Dare died in Newport Beach, California, on October 4, 1981, and was buried at Pacific View Memorial Park in Corona del Mar, California.

== Filmography ==
- Nearly Naked (1933 short)
- Very Close Veins (1934 short)
- Private Lessons (1934 short) .... Babs Henderson
- The Winnah! (1934 short) .... Dorothy
- Syncopated City (1934 hort) .... Hal's Assistant/The New Mayor
- Happiness Ahead (1934) .... Josie
- The St. Louis Kid (1934) .... Gracie Smith
- Sweet Adeline (1934) .... Dot/Band Leader
- Maybe It's Love (1935) .... Lila
- Gold Diggers of 1935 .... Arline Davis
- Springtime in Holland (1935 short)
- Front Page Woman (1935) .... Mae LaRue
- Romance of the West (1935 short)
- High Hat (1937) .... Elanda Lee
- Rose of Tralee (1937) .... Jean Hale
- Clothes and the Woman (1937) .... Carol Dixon
- Cut Out for Love (1937) .... Dorothy
- The Yanks Are Coming (1942) .... Peggy
- Musical Movieland (1944 short)

== Stage appearances ==
- The Only Girl (1934)
- Strike Me Pink (1933)
- Manhattan Vanities (1932)
- Here Comes the Groom (1931)
- America's Sweetheart (1931)
