= Bill Dillard =

American jazz musician

- Birth name: William Dillard
- Born: July 20, 1911; Philadelphia, Pennsylvania, U.S.
- Died: January 16, 1995 (aged 84); New York City, U.S.
- Genres: Jazz
- Instruments: Trumpet, vocals

William Dillard (July 20, 1911 – January 16, 1995) was an American jazz trumpeter, actor, and singer.

== Background ==
Dillard was born in Philadelphia, Pennsylvania, and played in bands led by Jelly Roll Morton, Benny Carter, Luis Russell and Teddy Hill, among others. He also had an acting career on Broadway, including in One Mo' Time.

== Discography ==
With Dizzy Gillespie

- The Complete RCA Victor Recordings (Bluebird, 1937–1949, [1995])

With Earle Warren

- Earle Warren (RCA, 1974)

== Filmography ==
=== Film ===
Year	Title	Role	Notes
1941	Murder with Music	Mike	
1946	House-Rent Party	Police Officer	
1946	Fight That Ghost	Jim Brown	
1948	The Fight Never Ends	Det. Billingsly	

=== Television ===
Year	Title	Role	Notes
1953	Omnibus	—	Episode: "135th Street"
1954	Kraft Television Theatre	—	Episode: "The Worried Man's Blues"
1957	The Green Pastures	King of Babylon	Television film
1980	Barney Miller	Edward Jennings / Fast Eddie	Episode: "Fog"
