= Cal Bailey =

American caricaturist (1909–1988)

- Born: Calvin Cornelius Bailey; June 14, 1909; Norfolk, Virginia, U.S.
- Died: December 10, 1988 (aged 79); Los Angeles, California, U.S.
- Burial place: Inglewood Park Cemetery
- Education: New Jersey Vocational School, Newark School of Fine and Industrial Art, Ohio State University
- Occupations: Caricaturist, cartoonist, illustrator, painter, pastelist
- Spouse: Cuma McNeal (m. 1935–?) Suzette Harbin (m. 1954–1977; div.)
- Children: 2

Calvin Cornelius Bailey Sr. (June 14, 1909 – December 10, 1988), more commonly known as Cal Bailey, was an American caricaturist, cartoonist, and illustrator. His work was nationally popular in the 1930s–1950s, and he had his own television program in San Francisco.

== Early life and education ==
Calvin Cornelius Bailey was born on June 14, 1909, in Norfolk, Virginia, United States. He was African American. Some sources incorrectly state his year of birth as 1915, or 1918.

Bailey studied at the New Jersey Vocational School and Newark School of Fine and Industrial Art (class of 1932). He continued his studies in 1935 at Ohio State University in Columbus, Ohio.

== Career ==
Bailey worked as an artist for the New York Amsterdam News, an African-American newspaper from Harlem.

In his early career in the 1930s he focused on caricatures of sports figures. He set up an easel during the 1932 Summer Olympics in Los Angeles. He also was an artist for two world's fairs; the 1933–1934 Chicago's World Fair Century of Progress International Exposition, and the 1939 New York World's Fair. His art was shown as early as the 1930s in the United States to both White and Black audiences.

Bailey created a cover in 1942 for Los Angeles School Journal, during Negro Education Week.

He was hired in 1952 to work for NBC-TV to do caricatures for its shows in Hollywood. He had many notable caricature subjects from this role, including Donald O'Connor, Bob Hope, the Ritz Brothers, Ben Blue, and Dennis Day.

In 1955, Bailey signed to do a four times weekly television show featuring his caricatures, called the, Musi-Cal Sketch Book (1956) on KSAN (UHF channel 32) in San Francisco. He was a regular artist performer in the 1956 at the popular Papagayo Room in San Francisco's Fairmont Hotel.

Harry Adams photographed him at work in 1956, in Los Angeles. His caricature artwork adorned restaurants in New York City, as well as the Brown Derby restaurant in Hollywood, and Scotty Campbell's Steakhouse in Atherton, California.

Jet magazine published in 1958 a photograph of model Alma Allen sitting for a portrait at his studio in Los Angeles.

== Personal life ==
His first marriage was to Cuma McNeal in 1935, and together they had two children. Bailey and actress Suzette Harbin married in 1954, in San Francisco, California. In 1977, they divorced in Monterey County, California.

== Exhibitions ==
- 1932, 28th Street YMCA, 1006 East 28th Street, Los Angeles, California
- 1933, 28th Street YMCA, 1006 East 28th Street, Los Angeles, California
- 1936, Atlantic City YMCA, Atlantic City, New Jersey
- 1944, Vernon Branch Library, 4505 South Central Avenue, Vernon, California
- 1945, South Side Community Art Center, Chicago, Illinois
