= Four Shall Die =

1940 film

- Theatrical release poster
- Directed by: William Beaudine; Leo C. Popkin
- Starring: Niel Webster
- Distributed by: Million Dollar Productions
- Release date: October 15, 1940
- Running time: 90 minutes
- Country: United States
- Language: English

Four Shall Die is a 1940 American supernatural crime film directed by William Beaudine. It features Dorothy Dandridge in her first credited film role.

== Cast ==
- Niel Webster as Pierre Touissant
- Mantan Moreland as Beefus, Touissant's Chauffeur
- Laurence Criner as Roger Fielding
- Dorothy Dandridge as Helen Fielding
- Vernon McCalla as Doctor Webb
- Monte Hawley as Dr. Hugh Leonard (as Monty Hawley)
- Reginald Fenderson as Hickson (as Reggie Fenderson)
- Jack Carr as Lew Covey
- Jess Lee Brooks as Bill Summers
- Edward Thompson as Sgt. Adams
