= Toddy Pictures Company =

American film production and distribution company

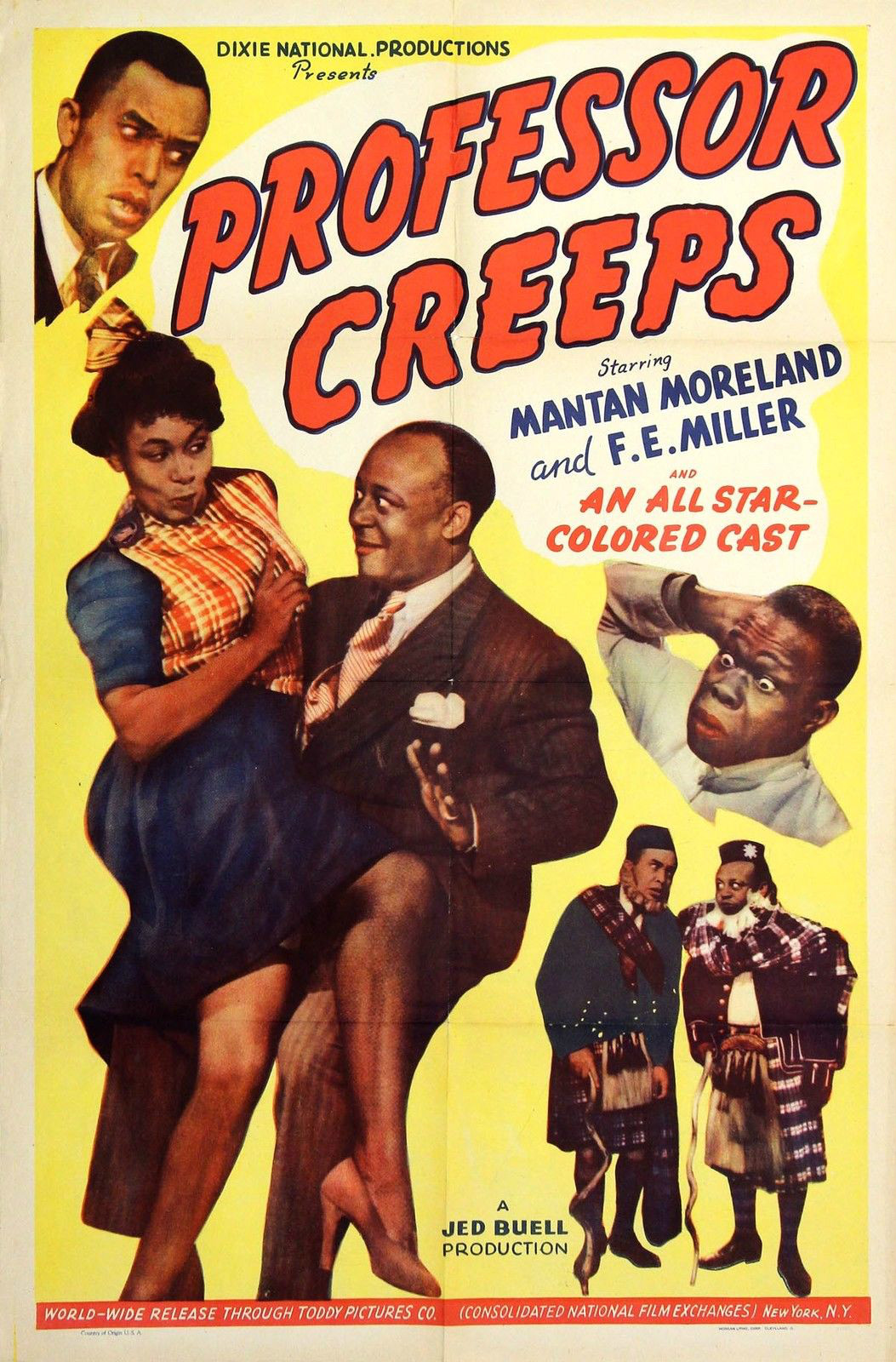
Advertisement for Professor Creeps

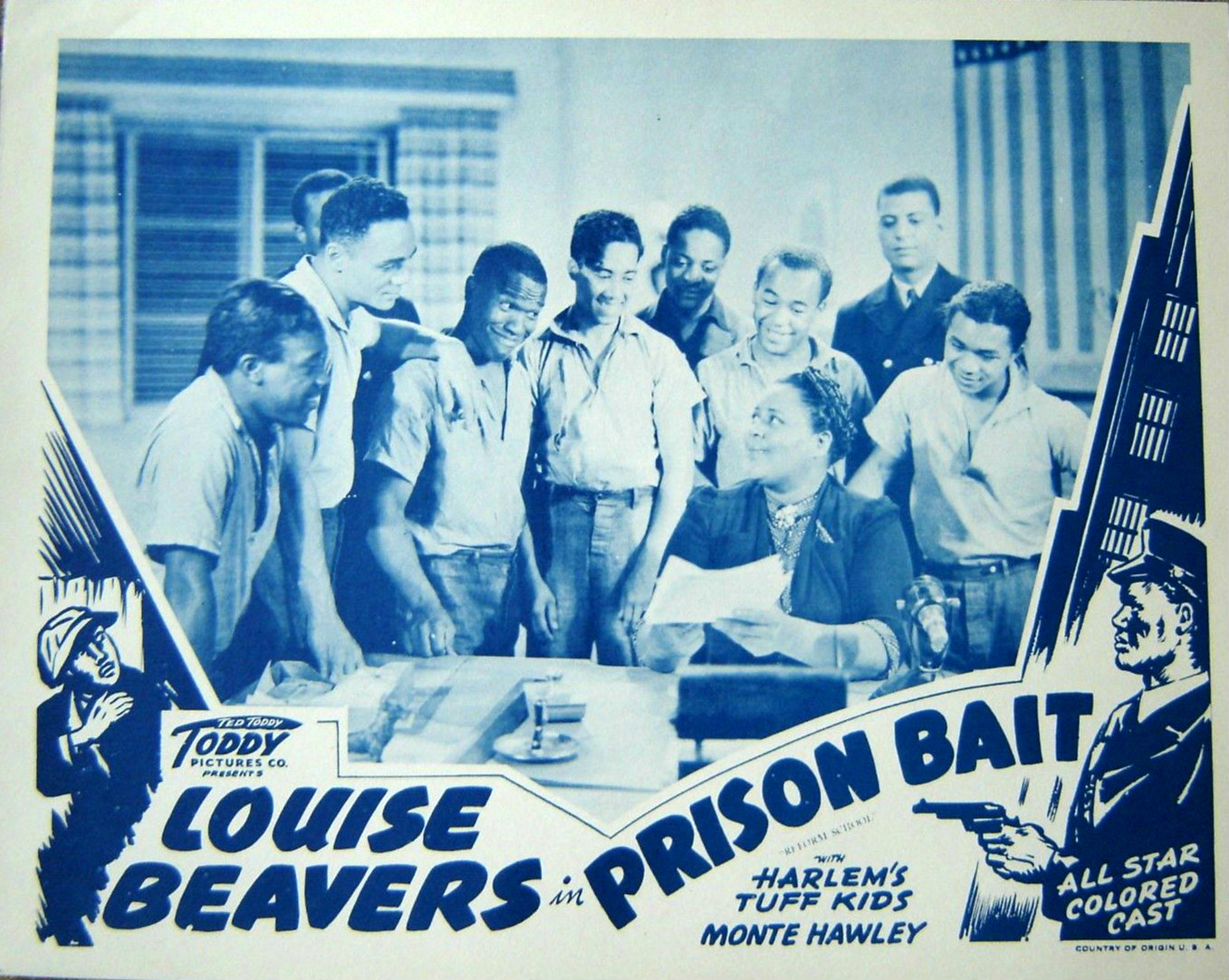
Lobby card for Prison Bait

Toddy Pictures Company was a film distribution and production company. It was founded in 1941 by Ted Toddy (1900-1983) in a consolidation of his film businesses under the new name. The film company specialized in African-American films.

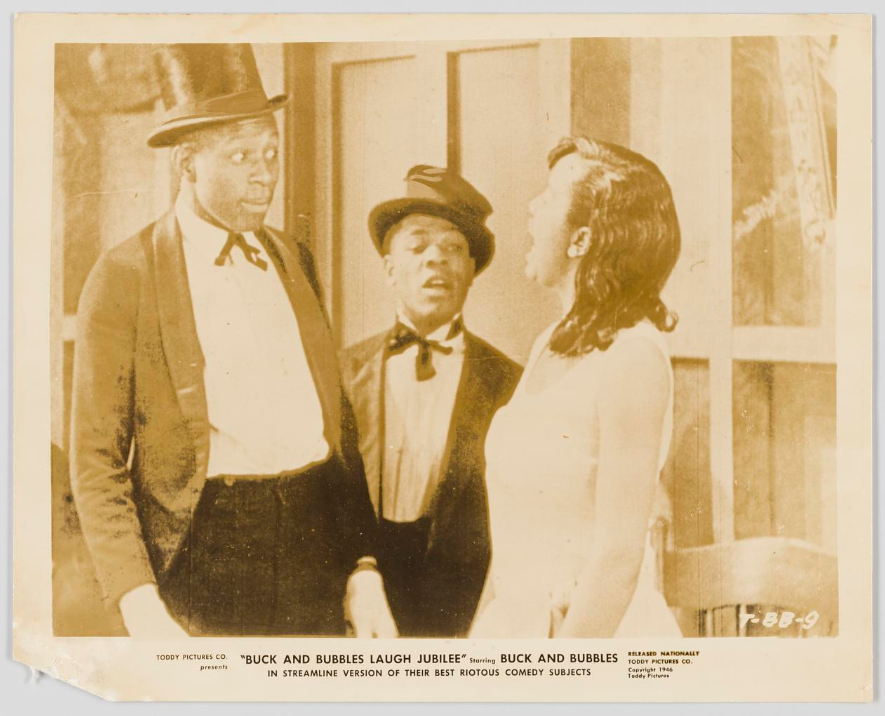
Film still for Buck and Bubbles Laugh Jubilee

Toddy was born in Russia. He worked for more than a decade at major studios before establishing Dixie National Pictures in Atlanta. He was involved in efforts to distribute the 1936 film Polygamy which ran into censorship hurdles and censor Joseph Breen.

Toddy added Million Dollar Productions to his business in 1940. Toddy re-released Million Dollar Productions films with new titles and marketing.

Toddy marketed light comedies with outdoor scenes and plenty of musical performances to Black audiences.

== Filmography ==
- Harlem on the Prairie (1937), distributor of a Sack Amusements film
- Polygamy (film) (1939), distributor for the Unusual Pictures film
- Up Jumped the Devil (1940), a Dixie National Pictures production
- Prison Bait (1940), a re-release of Reform School (film)
- His Harlem Wife (1941) a.k.a. Life Goes On (1938)
- Lucky Ghost (1942)
- Professor Creeps (1942)
- The Bronze Venus (1943), a re-release of the 1938 film The Duke Is Tops
- Night Club Girl (1944)
- Fight That Ghost (1946)
- Buck and Bubbles Laugh Jubilee
- Gun Moll, also known as Gun Smashers
- Fighting Americans, a war propaganda film
- The Return of Mandy's Husband
- Crooked Money
- Going to Glory Come to Jesus
- Murder Rap (film)
- Mantan Messes Up
- Eddie's Laugh Jamboree
- Mr.Smith Goes Ghost
- Racket Doctor, a re-release of Am I Guilty? (1940)
- What a Guy
- One Round Jones (1946) a Sepia Production starring Eddie Green, originally released in 1940
- Mantan Runs for Mayor (1947)
- Come on Cowboy starring Mantan Moreland
- House-Rent Party (1946)
- Gangsters on the Loose, a re-issue of Bargain with Bullets
