= High Hat (1937 film) =

- Directed by: Clifford Sanforth
- Written by: Alma Sioux Scarberry (novel); Sherman L. Lowe
- Produced by: Clifford Sanforth (producer)
- Starring: Frank Luther; Dorothy Dare; Lona Andre
- Cinematography: Jack Greenhalgh
- Edited by: Charles Abbott
- Music by: Oliver Wallace
- Production company: Imperial Productions
- Distributed by: Imperial Distributing Corporation
- Release date: 1937
- Running time: 74 minutes
- Country: United States
- Language: English

High Hat is a 1937 American musical comedy film directed by Clifford Sanforth and starring Frank Luther, Dorothy Dare and Lona Andre.

== Plot ==
Swanee is the mentor and boyfriend of a classical singer, Elanda, who refuses to lower herself by singing swing music, until Swanee shows her the way.

== Cast ==
- Frank Luther as Swanee Collier
- Dorothy Dare as Elanda Lee
- Lona Andre as Dixie Durkin
- Gavin Gordon as Gregory Dupont
- Franklin Pangborn as Renaldo Breton
- Esther Muir as Carmel Prevost
- Ferdinand Munier as Horatio Parker
- Robert Warwick as Craig Dupont Sr.
- Clarence Muse as Congo MacRosenbloom
- Harry Harvey as Nelson Connolly
- Jack Edwards, Jr. a.k.a. Sonny Edwards as Performer
- Sam Edwards a.k.a. Buddy Edwards as Performer
- Dolores Downey as Performer
- Peppy Downey as Performer
- Yvonne Downey as Performer
- Ted Dawson as Ted Dawson - Band Leader
- Ron Raymond as Performer
- Arnold Gray as Performer
- Kermit Holven as Performer
- Bruce Mitchell as Mug
- Fretta Shaw Singers as Singers
- Downey Sisters as Singing Trio

== Soundtrack ==
- Clarence Muse and Fretta Shaw Singers - "I Go Congo" (Written by Clarence Muse)
