= Suzette Harbin =

American actress and dancer (1915–1994)

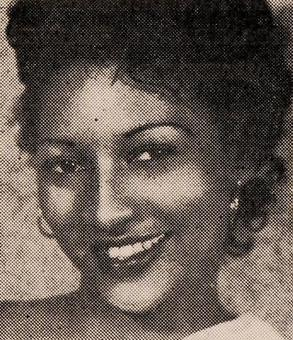
- Suzette Harbin, from a 1939 directory.
- Born: Suzette Marquin Harbin; July 4, 1915; Ledbetter, Texas, U.S.
- Died: September 5, 1994 (aged 79); Texas
- Other names: Suzette Harbin-Johnson, Suzette Harbin Bailey
- Occupations: Actress, dancer

Suzette Harbin (July 4, 1915 – September 5, 1994) was an American actress and dancer.

== Early life ==
Harbin was from Ledbetter, Texas and was raised in California, first in Pacific Grove, California, and then in Los Angeles. Harbin graduated from Jefferson High School in 1934, soon after the school's buildings were destroyed in the 1933 Long Beach earthquake.

== Career ==
Harbin worked as an artists' model in Los Angeles in the 1930s. Harbin's film appearances included roles in So Red the Rose (1935), Up Jumped the Devil (1941), Cabin in the Sky (1943), Stormy Weather (1943), I Dood It (1943), Jam Session (1944), To Have and Have Not (1944), Ziegfeld Follies (1945), Look-Out Sister (1947), The Foxes of Harrow (1947), The Pirate (1948), Sky Dragon (1949), Destination Murder (1950), The Cimarron Kid (1952), Skirts Ahoy! (1952), Lydia Bailey (1952), Bomba and the Jungle Girl (1952), The Green-Eyed Blonde (1957). She was also in an episode of the television program Wagon Train (1958). She was sometimes told that she was "too pretty" for the roles available to African-American actresses in mainstream films of the 1940s and 1950s.

In 1954, Harbin went to Korea to give 25 performances for American troops at military installations there, headlining the "first all-Negro entertainment package to tour Korea." She also toured military bases in Alaska that year, in a troupe where she was the only African-American performer.

In 1960 she retired to the Monterey Peninsula and directed children's theatre; she also worked as a Monterey County juvenile officer. She moved back to Texas in 1980, and worked as a tour guide at the airport in San Antonio.

== Personal life ==
Harbin married Hildred Claude Johnson in 1938, and for a time used the name Suzette Harbin-Johnson. She was injured in a car accident in 1952. She married caricature artist Cal Bailey in 1954. Harbin died in 1994, aged 79 years, in San Antonio, Texas.

== Filmography ==
Year	Title	Role	Notes
1935	So Red the Rose	Belle	Uncredited
1941	Up Jumped the Devil		
1943	Cabin in the Sky	Dancer / Jim Henry's Paradise Patron	Uncredited
1943	Stormy Weather	Dancer / Nightclub Patron	Uncredited
1943	I Dood It	Part of Hazel Scott's Entourage / Singer in Jericho	Uncredited
1944	Jam Session	Woman Armstrong Sings To	Uncredited
1944	To Have and Have Not	Waitress	Uncredited
1945	Ziegfeld Follies	Flirt ('Love')	Uncredited
1947	Look-Out Sister	Betty Scott	
1947	The Foxes of Harrow	Belle	Uncredited
1948	The Pirate	Black Maid	Uncredited
1949	Sky Dragon	Maid #2	Uncredited
1950	Destination Murder	Harriett - Nightclub Maid	
1952	The Cimarron Kid	Mrs. Stacey	Uncredited
1952	Skirts Ahoy!	Black Drill Team Member	Uncredited
1952	Lydia Bailey	Floreal	Uncredited
1952	Bomba and the Jungle Girl	Princess Baru	
1957	The Green-Eyed Blonde	Younger Woman	Uncredited
