= Look-Out Sister =

Film by Bud Pollard

- Directed by: Bud Pollard
- Starring: Louis Jordan
- Production company: Astor Pictures
- Release date: 1948
- Country: United States
- Language: English
- Budget: $60,000

Look-Out Sister is a 1948 film featuring Louis Jordan, directed by Bud Pollard for Astor Pictures. It has been described as a satirical, Western-themed musical and "horse opera". John E. Gordon wrote the story.

Jordan performs numerous songs in the film. The plot features Louis Jordan as a burnt out musician who heads to a sanatorium to recover and the dreams of going out west to a dude ranch. A poster for the film advertises it as including 11 great song hits and features the tagline "when he's not singin' he's shootin, when he's not shootin" he's lovin'. Louise Franklin plays a featured role in the film.

Excerpts from this film and his others, Beware (1946) and Reet, Petite and Gone (1947), as well as soundies were released as Louis Jordan: films and soundies

The Jazz Society of Chicago and Chicago Film Society scheduled a showing of the film in 2019 calling it a "joyously ingratiating, loose-limbed musical that packs 11 songs into an hour.

== Production ==
The film, called Lookout while in production, was budgeted at $60,000. It was named after Jordan's original song, "Look Out". Louis Jordan was one of the investors for the film. Some of the "swim and western atmosphere shots" were taken in the San Fernando Valley. During filming, Maceo Sheffield was injured after falling off of a horse in a scene where he was "in pursuit of an outlaw band".

== Cast ==
- Louis Jordan
- Suzette Harbin
- Monte Hawley
- Louise Franklin as Louise Ritchie
- Glenn Allen
- Tommy Southern
