= The Lonely Trail =

1936 film

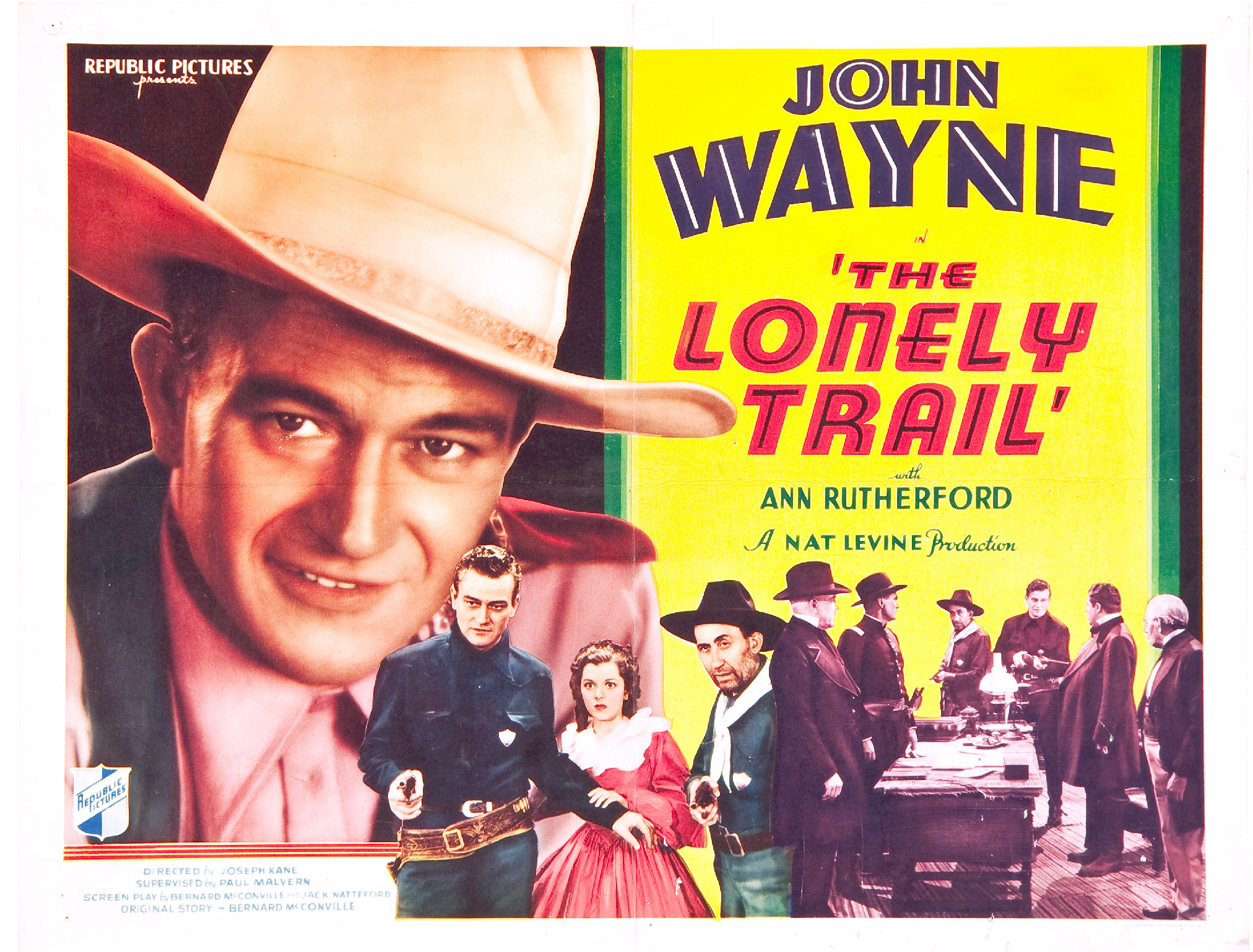
- Theatrical poster
- Directed by: Joseph Kane
- Written by: Bernard McConville; Jack Natteford
- Produced by: Nat Levine
- Starring: John Wayne; Ann Rutherford
- Cinematography: William Nobles
- Edited by: Robert Jahns
- Distributed by: Republic Pictures
- Release date: May 25, 1936
- Running time: 56 minutes
- Country: United States
- Language: English

The Lonely Trail is a 1936 American Western film starring John Wayne and Ann Rutherford.

== Plot ==
Though he fought for the North in the Civil War, John is asked by the Governor of Texas to get rid of some troublesome carpetbaggers. He enlists the help of Holden before learning that Holden too is plundering the local folk.

== Cast ==
- John Wayne as Captain John Ashley
- Ann Rutherford as Virginia Terry
- Cy Kendall as Adjutant General Benedict Holden
- Bob Kortman as Captain Hays
- Fred "Snowflake" Toones as Snowflake
- Sam Flint as Governor of Texas
- Dennis Moore as Dick Terry
- Jim Toney as Trooper Jed Calicutt
- Etta McDaniel as Mammy
- Yakima Canutt as Trooper Bull Horrell
- Lloyd Ingraham as Tucker (bookkeeper)
- James A. Marcus as Mayor
- Bob Burns as Rancher Jeff Pruitt
- Rodney Hildebrand as Cavalry captain
- Eugene Jackson as Harmonica player/dancer

== Critical reception ==
Writing for Jacobin in 2015, Eileen Jones criticized the film for promoting the Lost Cause of the Confederacy.

== See also ==
- John Wayne filmography
