= Murder by Television =

1935 American mystery film

- Film poster
- Directed by: Clifford Sanforth
- Written by: Joseph O'Donnell
- Produced by: Harry Joe Brown
- Starring: Bela Lugosi; June Collyer; Huntley Gordon; George Meeker
- Cinematography: James S. Brown Jr.
- Edited by: Leslie F. Wilder
- Music by: Oliver Wallace
- Production company: Cameo Pictures Corp.
- Distributed by: Imperial Distributing Corp.
- Release date: October 1, 1935
- Running time: 55 minutes
- Country: United States
- Language: English

Murder by Television (1935) is an American mystery film starring Bela Lugosi, June Collyer, and Huntley Gordon. The film is also known as The Houghland Murder Case. The cast also includes Hattie McDaniel.

== Plot ==
James Houghland, inventor of a new method by which television signals can be instantaneously sent anywhere in the world, refuses to sell the process to television companies, who then send agents to acquire the invention any way they can.

On the night of his initial broadcast Houghland is mysteriously murdered in the middle of his demonstration and it falls to Police Chief Nelson to determine who the murderer is from the many suspects present. Houghland's assistant, Arthur Perry, has apparently accepted a bribe of $100,000.00 to be a personal spy for a large industrial company. Richard Grayson is supposedly an industrial spy on a similar mission, and has apparently gotten in romantic good with Professor Houghland's daughter June. After the murder, these two are the leading suspects. One man who is never actually identified keeps trying to sneak into the sealed-off mansion and is repeatedly ejected yelling "I have business here!". The investigation is knocked sideways for a bit when Arthur Perry is found stabbed to death. But it is revealed that he was the dishonest twin brother of FBI investigator Edwin Perry; who appears out of nowhere and frightens all the ladies. Edwin Perry reveals the scientific method in which the murder was committed, and finds stolen blueprints of the invention in a secret compartment in the guilty party's wallet.

== Cast ==
- Bela Lugosi ... dual role as Dr. Arthur Perry and as Edwin Perry
- June Collyer ... June Houghland
- Huntley Gordon ... Dr. Henry M. Scofield (billed as Huntly Gordon)
- George Meeker ... Richard Grayson
- Henry Mowbray ... Chief of Police Milton
- Charles Hill Mailes ... Prof. James Houghland
- Claire McDowell ... Mrs. Houghland
- Hattie McDaniel ... Isabella - the Cook
- Allen Jung ... Ah Ling - the Houseboy (billed as Allan Jung)
- Charles K. French ... Donald M. Jordan
- Billy Sullivan as Attacked Night Watchman
