= Leroy Broomfield =

American performer

Leroy Broomfield (1902–1971) was a dancer in the United States who appeared on stage and in films. He was also a producer, choreographer and taught dance.

== Early life ==
Broomfield was the adopted son of an African American businessman and noted criminal from North Omaha, Nebraska named Jack Broomfield. Raised in a predominately African-American neighborhood called the Near North Side, his home was near the heart of the community at 24th and Lake Streets. As Broomfield's son, Leroy was given access to capital to start businesses and more. In 1919, he was the proprietor of a business called the Monarch Billards and the Monarch Hall in his father's building at 14th and Dodge. Closing that business in 1923, he started his own real estate firm in North Omaha, which merged with his father's business to form the Broomfield and Son Real Estate Company, which came to own more than 100 properties throughout Omaha and in Gary, Indiana.

When the senior Broomfield died in 1927, Leroy inherited a small fortune that allowed him to move to Los Angeles, California.

== Performing career ==
During a three day Smart Set Company production in Omaha in the early 1920s, Leroy worked as chorus boy and met producers Salem Tutt Whitney and J. Tutt, known as the Tutt Brothers. Impressed with Broomfield and at the urging of his uncle, the brothers took him with them to Broadway in New York City. While there he was a student of dancer Ted Shawn. It was also during this time he met Aurora Greeley who became his long term dancing partner.

Together, Broomfield and Greeley had a residency at Frank Sebastian's Cotton Club in Culver City, California from 1926 to 1938. As the most popular jazz club in the L.A. area, it was the largest indoor entertainment venue in Southern California in that era. Photographed with the Ubangi Club dancers in 1937, today California State University Northridge has a photograph of him in costume. On breaks from their residency, Broomfield and Greeley led international touring troupes across the United States, in China, and elsewhere. They performed original productions noted for their originality and delivery.

Broomfield lived in Los Angeles for the rest of his life.

When he died in 1971, Broomfield's death was not noted in the media and today his gravesite location is unknown.

== Theater ==
- How Come? (1923)

== Filmography ==
- The Lady Fare (1929)
- The Virginia Judge (1935) as Willie Gaylor
- So Red the Rose (1935)
- Close Shave (1942), short musical film with Broomfield, Greeley and music recorded from John Kirby's orchestra. An R.G.M. Productions film.

== See also ==
- Jack Broomfield
