= Henry King (musician) =

American orchestra leader, pianist (1906–1974)

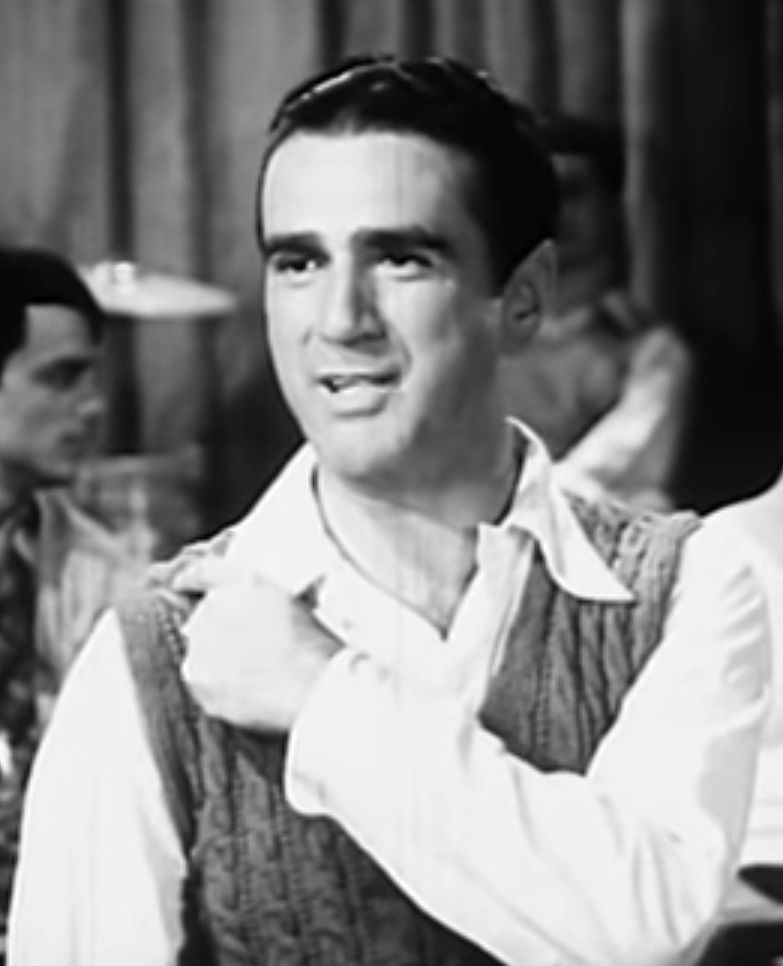
- King in The Yanks Are Coming (1942)
- Born: February 8, 1906; New York, U.S.
- Died: August 8, 1974 (aged 68); Houston, Texas, U.S.
- Occupations: Orchestra leader; pianist; Radio personality; actor
- Years active: 1933–1950
- Spouse: Vilma Lewis (m. 1937)

Henry King (February 8, 1906 – August 8, 1974) was an American orchestra leader and pianist who achieved significant success as a recording artist, hotel bandleader, and as leader of radio orchestras. He was most popular in the 1930s and 1940s. Today he is remembered as the orchestra leader of the Burns and Allen radio program.

== Biography ==
Henry King was born in February 8, 1906 in New York. He initially intended to be a classical concert pianist, having studied under Walter Damrosch for six years. Finding pop music to be more lucrative, he organized his first band in the early 1930s. The band was a society band, not a jazz band; as the band became successful, it found engagement at the most prestigious hotels.

Over his career, King believed his band to have broadcast more than 5,000 remotes. His theme was the Mitchell Parish-Frank Signorelli composition, "A Blues Serenade". King became the band leader of the Burns and Allen Campbell's Tomato Juice program Adventures of Gracie in 1936, and his first appearance was on September 2 that year. During this time period, he resided in San Francisco, but traveled to Hollywood on the day of the broadcast. He married Baltimore resident Vilma Lewis in January 1937 in the very early hours of the morning, given special dispensation as their careers interfered with a marriage during normal hours. This event was incorporated into the January 20, 1937, Burns and Allen program. When Burns and Allen left CBS for NBC and a new show sponsored by Grape Nuts at the end of March 1937, King did not follow them on radio, but took on an extended appointment at the Palmer House in Chicago instead. Later in his career, he modified his style to focus on Latin American-influenced music, becoming an early-adopter of rhumba and samba rhythms. In 1940, he was living in New York City on West 92nd Street.

King died in Houston, Texas on August 8, 1974, following a lengthy period of poor health.

King was reviewed as a superior emcee, presenting acts in a low-key manner that best suited his style.

=== Selected discography ===
Year	Title	Peak chart positions	Issued on
1933	"Speaking of Heaven"	–	Victor 24457
1933	"Don’t You Remember Me?"	–	Victor 24478
1933	"April in Paris"	–	Victor 24478
1934	"Coffee In The Morning"		Vocalion 2617-A
1934	"You’re a Builder Upper"	–	Columbia 2941-D
1934	"Fun to Be Fooled"	–	Columbia 2941-D
1935	"Dancing With My Shadow"	–	Columbia 2992-D
1935	"So Close to the Forest"	–	Columbia 3010-D
1935	"Chasing Shadows"	–	Columbia 3048-D
1936	"Would You?"	–	Decca 760
1936	"I’ve Got a Heavy Date"	–	Decca 760
1936	"A Fine Romance"	–	Decca 890
1938	"A Garden in Grenada"	–	Decca 1767
1940	"Palms of Paradise"	–	Decca 3072
1948	"Baby Face"	14	Decca 25356

== Filmography ==
- 1938 – Sunset Murder Case
- 1942 – The Yanks Are Coming
- 1943 – Spotlight Scandals
- 1944 – Sweethearts of the U.S.A.
- 1945 – Out of This World
