= The Yanks Are Coming (1942 film) =

1942 film

- Directed by: Alexis Thurn-Taxis
- Screenplay by: Arthur St. Claire and Sherman Lowe (screen adaptation); Edith Watkins (additional dialogue)
- Based on: Original story by Tony Stern, Lew Pollack and Edward E. Kaye
- Produced by: Lester Cutler
- Starring: Henry King and His Orchestra; Mary Healy; Little Jackie Heller (Slapsie) Maxie Rosenbloom; William Roberts; Parkyakarkus; Dorothy Dare
- Narrated by: Anson Bond
- Cinematography: Marcel Le Picard A.S.C.
- Edited by: Fred Bain
- Music by: Lee Zahler (musical director)
- Distributed by: Producers Releasing Corporation
- Release date: 9 November 1942
- Running time: 65 minutes
- Country: United States
- Language: English

The Yanks Are Coming is a 1942 American patriotic musical film from Poverty Row studio Producers Releasing Corporation directed by Alexis Thurn-Taxis.

== Plot ==
During World War II, singer Bob Reynolds leaves his band to enlist in the US Army. His band soon follows him. The Army uses the group to put on a show for the troops.

== Cast ==
- Henry King as Gil Whitney
- Mary Healy as Rita Edwards
- Little Jackie Heller as Sammy Winkle
- (Slapsie) Maxie Rosenbloom as Butch
- William Roberts as Bob Reynolds
- Parkyarkarkus as Parky
- Dorothy Dare as Peggy
- Lynn Starr as Vicki
- Jane Novak as Flora
- Charles Purcell as Corporal Jenks
- Forrest Taylor as Captain Brown
- David O'Brien as Sergeant Callahan
- and Lew Pollack as himself

Uncredited

- Snub Pollard as Soldier in canteen

== Prolog ==
=== Text in opening credits ===
"This picture is humbly dedicated to the millions of Yanks and the Armed Forces of the United Nations whose devotion, gallantry and courage is destined to wipe the Axis scourge from the face of the earth, in order that Democracy and the Freedom of Man may survive."

=== Narration by Anson Bond ===
"This is America. Homeland of a people strong and self reliant... proud in the way of free men. A land where liberty, equality and justice are living breathing symbols of a way of life. Where the right of free speech, freedom of the press and the right to worship without hindrance or let are a nation's birthright. A nation without master, without slave, where the right to education and learning are limited only by ambition... where old age is venerated and loved... not beaten and destroyed. And where the right to the pursuit of happiness is open to all, regardless of race, creed or color... where music and the other arts are not restricted by the word verboten."

== Songs ==
=== Music by Lew Pollack and Tony Stern, lyrics by Herman Ruby and Sidney Clare ===
- "The Yanks Are Coming" (Henry King and his Orchestra)
- "I Must Have Priorities on Your Love" (William Roberts [singing voice of uncredited William Marshall] and Lynn Starr)
- " There Will Be No Blackout of Democracy"
- "Zip Your Lip" (Parkyarkarkus)

=== Music and lyrics by Kay Crothers and Dr. Arthur Garland ===
- Don't Fool Around with My Heart (William Roberts [singing voice of uncredited William Marshall] and Lynn Starr)
