= Leo C. Popkin =

American film director and producer (1914–2011)

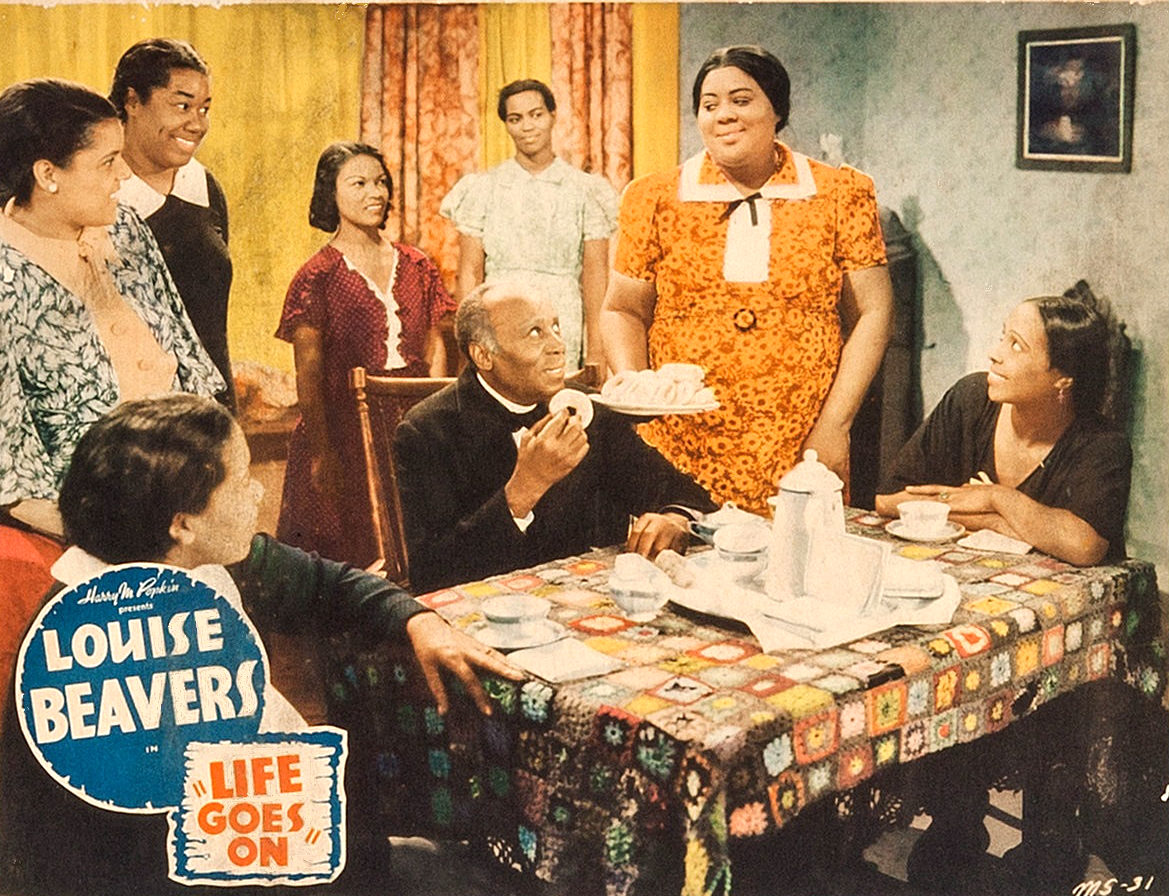
Lobby card for Life Goes On with "Harry M. Popkin Presents Louise Beavers" logo inset

Leo C. Popkin (1914–2011) was a film director and producer in the United States. His brother Harry M. Popkin was the executive producer of Million Dollar Productions, a partnership that included Ralph Cooper.

He managed African American movie theaters in Los Angeles. He is known for his gangster films.

He and his brother Harry M. Popkin (1906 – October 7, 1991) worked on movies together.

== Filmography ==
- The Flaming Crisis (1924), co-director
- The Duke Is Tops (1938), producer
- Gang Smashers (1938), director
- Reform School (1939), director
- While Thousands Cheer (1940), director
- Four Shall Die (1940), co-director
- My Dear Secretary (1948), producer
- D.O.A. (1949), producer
- Impact (1949), producer
- Champagne for Caesar (1950), co-producer
- The Well (1951), co-director and co-producer
