= Gee Gee James =

American actress

- Born: Regina Theodora James circa 1903; Philadelphia
- Died: 1971; Philadelphia
- Education: J. W. Hallahan Catholic Girls High School
- Height: 5 ft 5 in (165 cm)

Regina Theodora James, better known as Gee Gee James (born 1902 or 1903, died 1971), was an African American radio and theater actress and singer most notable in the 1930s and '40s. James was racially typecast as a domestic worker.

== Career ==
After high school, she sang with Claude Hopkins' band.

She was a cast member in Will Morrissey's Hot Rhythm (1930), along with George Wiltshire. (note mention below)

She played Tillie on The O'Neills.

Fay M. Jackson described her in 1935:

Over the kilocycle waves, she is the light hearted Mignonette, one of the bright lights of radio’s original musical comedy, The Gibson Family [...] Off the air, she is the equally pert and lively Gee Gee James. First as a chorus girl, then as a soubrette, she followed her star. Radio fans first heard Gee Gee over a local station in Philadelphia and shortly thereafter she was signed for her first network commercial — The Gibson Family. Miss James is determined to become a headliner. A topnotch voice, pluck, persistence, and constitutional good humor combine to further her ambition.

An episode of The Gibson Family that aired on May 12, 1935 featured a wedding between James' character Mignonette, and Theophilus (played by another African American actor, Ernest Whitman; see Personal life below), with Hall Johnson's choir performing.

She performed comedy with Eddie Green on Louis Armstrong's radio program in 1937.

A 1938 profile highlighted her role as Tulip on Hilltop House, and described her as "one of the best known radio actresses on the air today. Gee Gee not only acts with the best, but sings equally as well."

She played an eponymous role on Her Honor, Nancy James in 1939.

She voiced performances on three episodes of The Jack Benny Program in 1940-41.

She was in the original cast of the plays:

- Michael Drops In (by William DuBois; opened December 27, 1938), as "Hattie".
- No Time for Comedy (opened April 17, 1939), as "Clementine"
- Three's a Family (opened May 5, 1943), as "Another Maid"
- A Streetcar Named Desire (opened December 3, 1947), as "Negro Woman"

== Personal life ==
A March 1939 news article stated she was the wife of George Wiltshire, and had a 6 year old daughter who used the name Gee Gee as well.

Elva Diane Green, daughter of Eddie Green, stated that James was later married to Ernest Whitman.
