= So Red the Rose (film) =

1935 film by King Vidor

- Directed by: King Vidor
- Written by: Maxwell Anderson; Edwin Justus Mayer; Laurence Stallings; Stark Young (novel)
- Produced by: Douglas MacLean
- Starring: Margaret Sullavan; Walter Connolly; Randolph Scott
- Cinematography: Victor Milner
- Edited by: Eda Warren
- Music by: W. Franke Harling
- Distributed by: Paramount Pictures
- Release date: November 9, 1935
- Running time: 82 minutes
- Country: United States
- Language: English

So Red the Rose is a 1935 American drama film directed by King Vidor and starring Margaret Sullavan, Walter Connolly, and Randolph Scott. The Civil War-era romance is based on the 1934 novel of the same name by Stark Young.

The film did not enjoy great popularity at the box office. After this film, Civil War films were considered box office poison in Hollywood until Bette Davis and Henry Fonda's performance in 1938's Jezebel, which was a success. This was followed by the overwhelming popularity of Gone with the Wind in 1939, an adaptation of Margaret Mitchell's bestseller of the same name. In February 2020, the film was shown at the 70th Berlin International Film Festival, as part of a retrospective dedicated to King Vidor's career.

== Plot ==
In 1861, Valette Bedford (Margaret Sullavan) lives on the plantation Portobello with her family, including her parents, Malcolm (Walter Connolly) and Sallie Bedford (Janet Beecher), as well as her older cousin, Duncan Bedford (Randolph Scott), who she is madly in love with. When 'war fever' interrupts their peaceful life, Duncan refuses to enlist, based on principle. However, eventually, all the Bedford men are drawn into the war effort.

First, Malcolm and Sallie's oldest son, Edward (Harry Ellerbe) is convinced after a family friend dies in battle. Malcolm decides to join the Confederate Army after the Union troops wake him in the night to act as their guide and wound his pride.

At this point, Sallie has a vision of her son, dead on the battlefield. Duncan, Sallie, and one of their faithful slave servants, William Veal (Daniel L. Haynes), drive down to the Confederate battle site to find Edward, slain, as in Sallie's vision. Moved by the scene, Duncan is finally convinced to join the war effort.

Back on the plantation, Cato (Clarence Muse) starts a rebellion amongst the other farm hands, believing that Union liberation would bring them a life of leisure. William attempts to stop the revolt, but is tackled by the field hands. Valette steps up to intervene, reminding Cato how he cared for her as a child, and beseeching them not to destroy their home. Cato and the other farm hands go back to the fields.

Shortly, a wounded Malcolm returns home and the slaves gather around to pay respects to their master, singing and waving. Sadly, Malcolm succumbs to his wounds, and Sallie announces to the slaves that they are free to go, as their master won't need them anymore.

Soon after, two Union soldiers arrive on the plantation and threaten the Bedford women. Confederate cavalrymen arrive and kill one soldier, wounding the other. Valette takes pity on the wounded soldier, only a boy who is pleading for his life. She attempts to hide him, claiming him as her brother. But Valette finds out that one of the Confederate soldiers is actually Duncan, now hardened by war and bent on revenge. She convinces Duncan to spare the boy, but when more Confederate soldiers show up, they capture Duncan, burn Portobello, and the boy is found dead in the morning.

At the end of the war, the remaining Bedfords, along with the loyal William have taken up in an outbuilding, where they cook over an open fire. Duncan finally returns, and he and Valette are tearfully reunited, older and wiser from the tragedies of war.

== Cast ==
- Margaret Sullavan as Valette Bedford
- Walter Connolly as Malcolm Bedford
- Randolph Scott as Duncan Bedford
- Janet Beecher as Sallie Bedford
- Elizabeth Patterson as Mary
- Robert Cummings as Archie Pendleton
- Harry Ellerbe as Edward Bedford
- Dickie Moore as Middleton Bedford
- Charles Starrett as George McGehee
- Johnny Downs as Wounded Yankee Corporal
- Daniel L. Haynes as William Veal
- Clarence Muse as Cato
- James Burke as Major Rushton
- Warner Richmond as Confederate Sergeant
- Alfred Delcambre as Charles Tolliver
- Stanley Andrews as Cavalry Captain (uncredited)
- Suzette Harbin as Belle (uncredited)
- John Larkin as Cato's Companion (uncredited)
- Lloyd Ingraham as Officer (uncredited)
- Madame Sul-Te-Wan as Slave (uncredited)

== Production ==
Robert Cummings' casting led to him being offered a long-term contract with Paramount.

== See also ==
- List of films and television shows about the American Civil War

== Sources ==
- Andre Sennwald, "King Vidor's Screen Version of the Stark Young Novel 'So Red the Rose' at the Paramount," The New York Times, November 28, 1935.
- Rodriguez, Junius P. Encyclopedia of Slave Resistance and Rebellion. Greenwood milestones in African American history. Westport, Conn: Greenwood Press, 2007. ISBN 0-313-33271-1
