= Reginald Fenderson =

American actor (1911–1986)

Reginald Hartley Fenderson (December 28, 1911 – August 16, 1986) was an American actor in theatrical productions and films in the United States. He appeared in various films with African American casts in the 1930s and 1940s.

Reginald Fenderson was born in Philadelphia, Pennsylvania on December 28, 1911. His father, Alfonso Fenderson, was the original actor who portrayed Moses in the play, The Green Pastures.

Reginald Fenderson was an actor on the stage version and road tour of Green Pastures, playing the characters Joshua and the magician for at least five years. He played a feature role in the 1939 film Reform School, as an inmate named Freddie Gordon. The newspaper The Washington Afro-American stated that Fenderson "[handled] the role Freddie Gordon with admirable restraint, and is never guilty of melodramatics in a part that easily lends itself to over-portrayal."

Fenderson married Ella J. in 1933. They filed for divorce in 1938.

Fenderson served as a Private in the United States Army. Around 1943, he transferred to the Special Service Division and was later discharged. While in the army, he performed in one-act plays as part of the Huachuca Players, Fort Huachuca Little Theatre Group.

Fenderson died in San Dimas, California on August 16, 1986, at the age of 74.

== Filmography ==
- The Green Pastures (1936) as Joshua
- Bargain with Bullets (1937)
- Life Goes On (1938) as Henry Weston, aka Monte Howard
- Gang Smashers (1938)
- Reform School (1939) as Freddie Gordon
- While Thousands Cheer (1940) as Phil Harrington
- Gang War (1940) as Danny
- Lucky Ghost (1942) as Dealer
