= Louise Beavers =

American actress (1900–1962)

- Beavers in 1934
- Born: March 8, 1900; Cincinnati, Ohio, U.S.
- Died: October 26, 1962 (aged 62); Los Angeles, California, U.S.
- Resting place: Evergreen Cemetery, Los Angeles, California
- Other name: Louise Beaver
- Occupation: Actress
- Years active: 1927–1960
- Spouses: Robert Clark (m. 1936, divorced) Leroy Moore (m. 1952)

Louise Beavers (March 8, 1900 – October 26, 1962) was an American film and television actress who appeared in dozens of films and two hit television shows from the 1920s to 1960. She played a prominent role in advancing the lives of black Americans through her work and collaborated with fellow advocates to improve the social standing and media image of the black community.

== Early life ==
Beavers was born in Cincinnati, Ohio to school teacher Ernestine (Monroe) Beavers and William M. Beavers, who was originally from Georgia. Her mother's illness caused the family to move to Pasadena, California.

In Pasadena, she attended school and engaged in several after-school activities, such as basketball and church choir. Her mother also worked as a voice teacher and taught her how to sing. In 1920, Beavers graduated from Pasadena High School. She then worked as a dressing-room attendant for a photographer and served as a personal maid to film star Leatrice Joy.

== Career ==
Beavers' acting career began as a member of the Lady Minstrels, a group of young women who staged amateur productions and appeared on stage at the Loews State Theatre. Charles Butler, an agent for African-American actors, saw one of her early performances and recommended that she audition for a film role.

Beavers was initially hesitant to audition for film roles because of the negative portrayal of blacks in film. She once said, "In all the pictures I had seen… they never used colored people for anything except savages." However, she won a role in the film Uncle Tom’s Cabin (1927) and went on to play stereotypical black roles such as those of a slave, a mother figure, a maid or domestic servant.

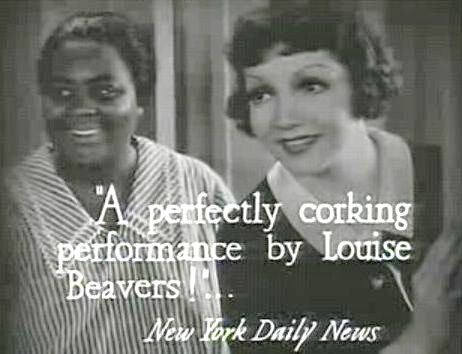
With Claudette Colbert in Imitation of Life (1934)

After playing the role of Julia, the maid and mother figure to a young white woman, in Coquette (1929), Beavers gained more attention for her work and was able to transition to less stereotypical roles. Beavers played Delilah in Imitation of Life (1934), again in the role of a housekeeper, but, instead of the usual stereotypical comedic or purely functional role, Delilah's storyline constitutes a secondary parallel plot in which her problems are given considerable emotional gravity. Some in the media recognized the unfairness of Hollywood's double standard regarding race. A contributor to California Graphic Magazine wrote: "the Academy could not recognize Miss Beavers. She is black!"

Beavers played the lead role in the film Reform School (1939), once thought to be a lost film, as a forward-thinking probation officer who becomes the superintendent of a reform school and implements major changes.

In the film Holiday Inn (1942), Beavers performed a song during a minstrel show number celebrating Abraham Lincoln's birthday. Because the number features Bing Crosby and others in blackface, some consider it racially offensive and it is often excised from television screenings of the film.

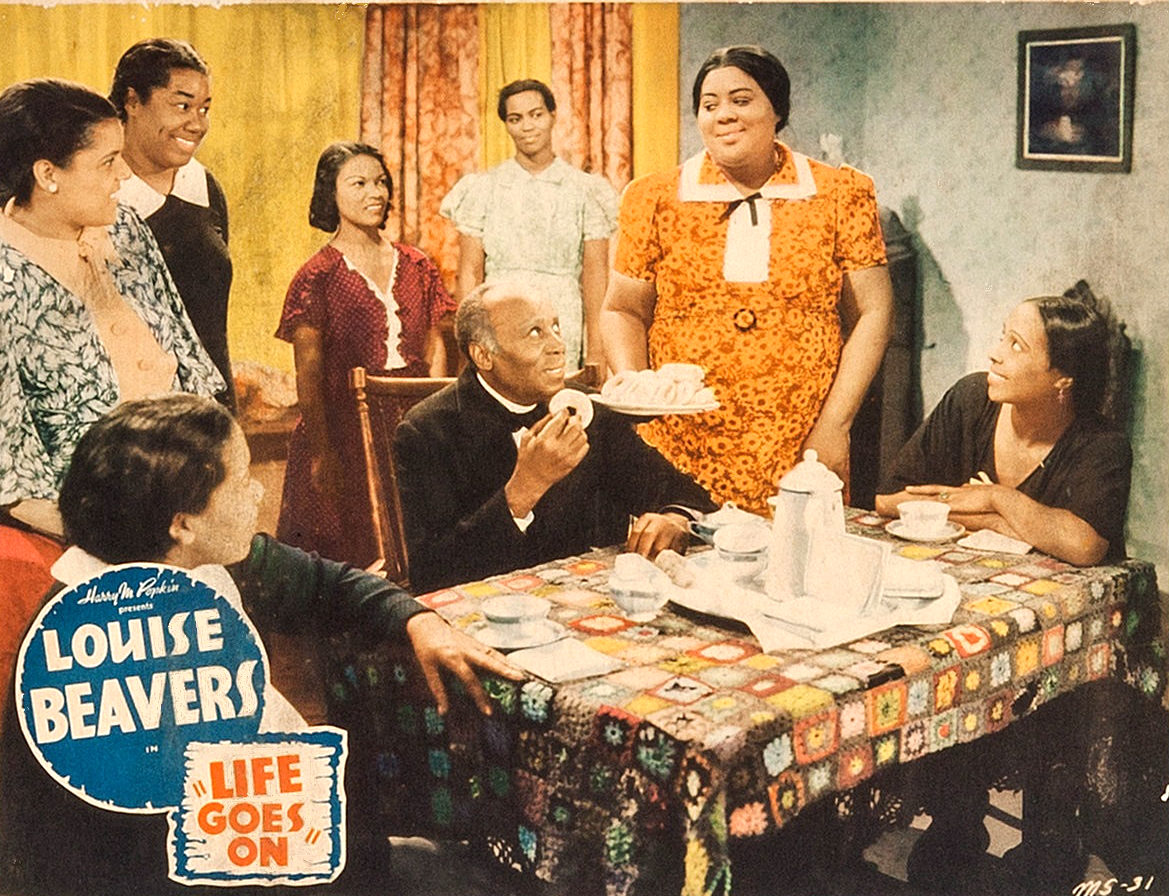
Lobby card for the Million Dollar Productions film Life Goes On with "Harry M. Popkin Presents Louise Beavers" logo inset

Beavers was one of three actresses (including Hattie McDaniel and Ethel Waters) to portray housekeeper Beulah on the Beulah television show, the first television sitcom to star a black person. She also played a maid for the first two seasons of The Danny Thomas Show (1953–1955).

In addition to her film work, Beavers conducted theater tours as long as 20 weeks each year.

As Beavers' career grew, some criticized her for the roles that she accepted, alleging that such roles institutionalized the view that blacks were subservient to whites. Beavers dismissed the criticism, acknowledging the limited opportunities available but saying: "I am only playing the parts. I don't live them." As she became more widely known, Beavers began to speak against Hollywood's portrayal and treatment of African Americans, both during production and after promoting the films. Beavers became active in public life, seeking to help support African Americans. She endorsed Robert S. Abbott, the editor of The Chicago Defender, who fought for African-Americans' civil rights. She supported Richard Nixon, whom she believed would help black Americans in the struggle for civil rights.

== Personal life ==
Beavers's cousin George Beavers, Jr. was a cofounder of the Golden State Mutual Life Insurance Company.

She became a prominent and active member of the black community in Los Angeles. She was involved in community functions, including those at the People’s Independent Church, where she helped develop the theater program of the Young People’s Lyceum. She was also involved in the 1939 public ceremonies celebrating development of the all-black resort Val Verde County Park.

In 1936, Beavers married Robert Clark, who later became her manager. Beavers and Clark later divorced and remarried.

In 1952, Beavers married Leroy Moore, with whom she remained until her death in 1962. She had no children.

In later life, Beavers was plagued by health issues, including diabetes. She died on October 26, 1962, at the age of 62, following a heart attack, at Cedars of Lebanon Hospital in Los Angeles.

== Honors ==
Beavers was inducted into the Black Filmmakers Hall of Fame in 1976.

She was an honorary member of the Sigma Gamma Rho sorority, one of the four historically African-American sororities and a part of the National Pan-Hellenic Council, also referred to as the Divine 9.

== Filmography ==
Features

- Uncle Tom's Cabin (1927) as Slave at Wedding (uncredited)
- Coquette (1929) as Julia
- Glad Rag Doll (1929) as Hannah
- Gold Diggers of Broadway (1929) as Sadie the Maid
- Barnum Was Right (1929) as Maid (uncredited)
- Wall Street (1929) as Magnolia
- Nix on Dames (1929) as Magnolia
- Second Choice (1930) as Maid (uncredited)
- Wide Open (1930) as Easter
- She Couldn't Say No (1930) as Cora
- Honey (1930) as Black Revivalist (uncredited)
- True to the Navy (1930) as Maid (uncredited)
- Safety in Numbers (1930) as Messalina
- Back Pay (1930) as Nellie, Hester's Maid (uncredited)
- Recaptured Love (1930) as Maid (uncredited)
- Our Blushing Brides (1930) as Amelia, the Mannequins' Maid (uncredited)
- Manslaughter (1930) as Rose (prison inmate) (uncredited)
- Outside the Law (1930) as Judy the Maid (uncredited)
- Bright Lights (1930) as Angela - the Maid (uncredited)
- Paid (1930) as Black Convict (uncredited)
- Scandal Sheet (1931)
- Millie (1931) as Maid (uncredited)
- Don't Bet on Women (1931) as Maid (uncredited)
- Six Cylinder Love (1931, uncredited)
- Party Husband (1931) as Laura's Maid (uncredited)
- Annabelle's Affairs (1931) as Ruby
- Sundown Trail (1931) as Auntie Jenny
- Reckless Living (1931) as Maid
- Girls About Town (1931) as Hattie
- Good Sport (1931) as September
- Ladies of the Big House (1931) as Ivory
- The Greeks Had a Word for Them (1932) as Beautician (uncredited)
- The Expert (1932) as Lulu
- It's Tough to Be Famous (1932) as Ada, Janet's Maid
- Young America (1932) as Maid (uncredited)
- Night World (1932) as Maid (uncredited)
- The Strange Love of Molly Louvain (1932) as Washroom Attendant (uncredited)
- Street of Women (1932) as Mattie, Natalie's maid
- The Dark Horse (1932) as Levinnia, Kay's Maid (uncredited)
- What Price Hollywood? (1932) as The Maid
- Unashamed (1932) as Amanda Jones
- Divorce in the Family (1932) as Rosetta
- Hell's Highway (1932) as Rascal's Sweetheart at Visitor Center (uncredited)
- Wild Girl (1932) as Mammy Lou (uncredited)
- Too Busy to Work (1932) as Mammy
- She Done Him Wrong (1933) as Pearl
- Her Splendid Folly (1933) as Anastasia
- 42nd Street (1933) as Pansy, Dorothy's Maid (uncredited)
- Girl Missing (1933) as Julie - Daisy's Maid (uncredited)
- The Phantom Broadcast (1933) as Penny (uncredited)
- Pick-Up (1933) as Magnolia (uncredited)
- Central Airport (1933) as Hotel Maid (uncredited)
- The Big Cage (1933) as Mandy (uncredited)
- The Story of Temple Drake (1933) as Minnie
- What Price Innocence? (1933) as Hannah
- Hold Your Man (1933) as Elite Club Attendant (uncredited)
- Midnight Mary (1933) as Anna, Mary's Maid (uncredited)
- Her Bodyguard (1933) as Margot's Maid
- A Shriek in the Night (1933) as Maid
- Notorious But Nice (1933) as Ophelia (uncredited)
- Bombshell (1933) as Loretta
- Only Yesterday (1933) as Abby, the Emerson's Maid (uncredited)
- In the Money (1933) as Lily
- Jimmy and Sally (1933) as Maid (uncredited)
- Palooka (1934) as Crystal
- Bedside (1934) as Pansy
- I've Got Your Number (1934) as Crystal
- Gambling Lady (1934) as Suzy - Peter's Cook (uncredited)
- A Modern Hero (1934) as Azais' Maid (uncredited)
- The Woman Condemned (1934) as Sally - Jane's Maid
- Registered Nurse (1934) as Flo, Sadie's Maid (uncredited)
- Glamour (1934) as Millie
- I Believed in You (1934) as Prisoner (uncredited)
- Merry Wives of Reno (1934) as Derwent's Client, Black Mother of 12 Wanting a Divorce (uncredited)
- Cheaters (1934) as Lily
- The Merry Frinks (1934) as Camille, Hattie's Maid
- Dr. Monica (1934) as Sarah - Mary's Maid (uncredited)
- I Give My Love (1934) as Maid
- Beggar's Holiday (1934) as Heliotrope
- Imitation of Life (1934) as Delilah Johnson
- West of the Pecos (1934) as Mauree
- Million Dollar Baby (1934) as Black Mother
- Annapolis Farewell (1935) as Miranda
- Bullets or Ballots (1936) as Nellie LaFleur
- Wives Never Know (1936) as Florabelle
- General Spanky (1936) as Cornelia
- Rainbow on the River (1936) as Toinette
- Make Way for Tomorrow (1937) as Mamie
- Wings Over Honolulu (1937) as Mammy
- Love in a Bungalow (1937) as Millie
- The Last Gangster (1937) as Gloria
- Scandal Street (1938) as Clairce
- Life Goes On (1938) as Sally Weston
- Brother Rat (1938) as Jenny
- The Headleys at Home (1938) as Hyacinth
- Peck's Bad Boy with the Circus (1938) as Cassey
- Made for Each Other (1939) as Lily, Cook #3 (uncredited)
- The Lady's from Kentucky (1939) as Aunt Tina
- Reform School (1939) as Mother Barton
- Parole Fixer (1940) as Aunt Lindy
- Women Without Names (1940) as Ivory
- Primrose Path (1940) as Woman Talking to Police (uncredited)
- I Want a Divorce (1940) as Celestine
- No Time for Comedy (1940) as Clementine
- Virginia (1941) as Ophelia
- Sign of the Wolf (1941) as Beulah
- Kisses for Breakfast (1941) as Clotilda
- Belle Starr (1941) as Mammy Lou
- Shadow of the Thin Man (1941) as Stella
- The Vanishing Virginian (1942) as Aunt Emmeline
- Young America (1942) as Pansy
- Reap the Wild Wind (1942) as Maum Maria
- Holiday Inn (1942) as Mamie
- The Big Street (1942) as Ruby - Gloria's Maid (uncredited)
- Seven Sweethearts (1942) as Petunia, the Maid
- Tennessee Johnson (1942) as Addie (uncredited)
- Good Morning, Judge (1943) as Cleo
- DuBarry Was a Lady (1943) as Niagara
- All by Myself (1943) as Willie
- Top Man (1943) as Cleo - the Warrens' Maid
- Jack London (1943) as Mammy Jenny
- There's Something About a Soldier (1943) as Birdie (uncredited)
- Follow the Boys (1944) as Louise Beavers (uncredited)
- South of Dixie (1944) as Magnolia Brown / Chloe
- Dixie Jamboree (1944) as Opal
- Barbary Coast Gent (1944) as Bedelia
- Delightfully Dangerous (1945) as Hannah
- Young Widow (1946) as Rosie, the Cook (uncredited)
- Lover Come Back (1946) as Martha, Kay's Maid
- Banjo (1947) as Lindy
- Mr. Blandings Builds His Dream House (1948) as Gussie
- A Southern Yankee (1948) as Laundry Woman (uncredited)
- For the Love of Mary (1948) as Bertha
- Good Sam (1948) as Chloe
- Tell It to the Judge (1949) as Cleo, Marsha's Maid (uncredited)
- Girls' School (1950) as Hattie
- The Jackie Robinson Story (1950) as Jackie's Mother
- My Blue Heaven (1950) as Selma
- Colorado Sundown (1952) as Mattie - Jackie's Maid
- I Dream of Jeanie (1952) as Mammy
- Never Wave at a WAC (1953) as Artamesa, Jo's Maid
- Good-bye, My Lady (1956) as Bonnie Drew
- You Can't Run Away from It (1956) as Maid
- Teenage Rebel (1956) as Willamay
- Tammy and the Bachelor (1957) as Osia
- The Goddess (1958) as The Cook
- All the Fine Young Cannibals (1960) as Rose
- The Facts of Life (1960) as Gussie

Short subjects

- Oriental Hugs (1928)
- Election Day (1929) as Farina's Mother
- Knights Before Christmas (1930)
- You're Telling Me (1932) as The Maid (uncredited)
- Hesitating Love (1932)
- The Midnight Patrol (1933) (scenes deleted)
- Grin and Bear It (1933)
