= Laurence Criner =

American actor

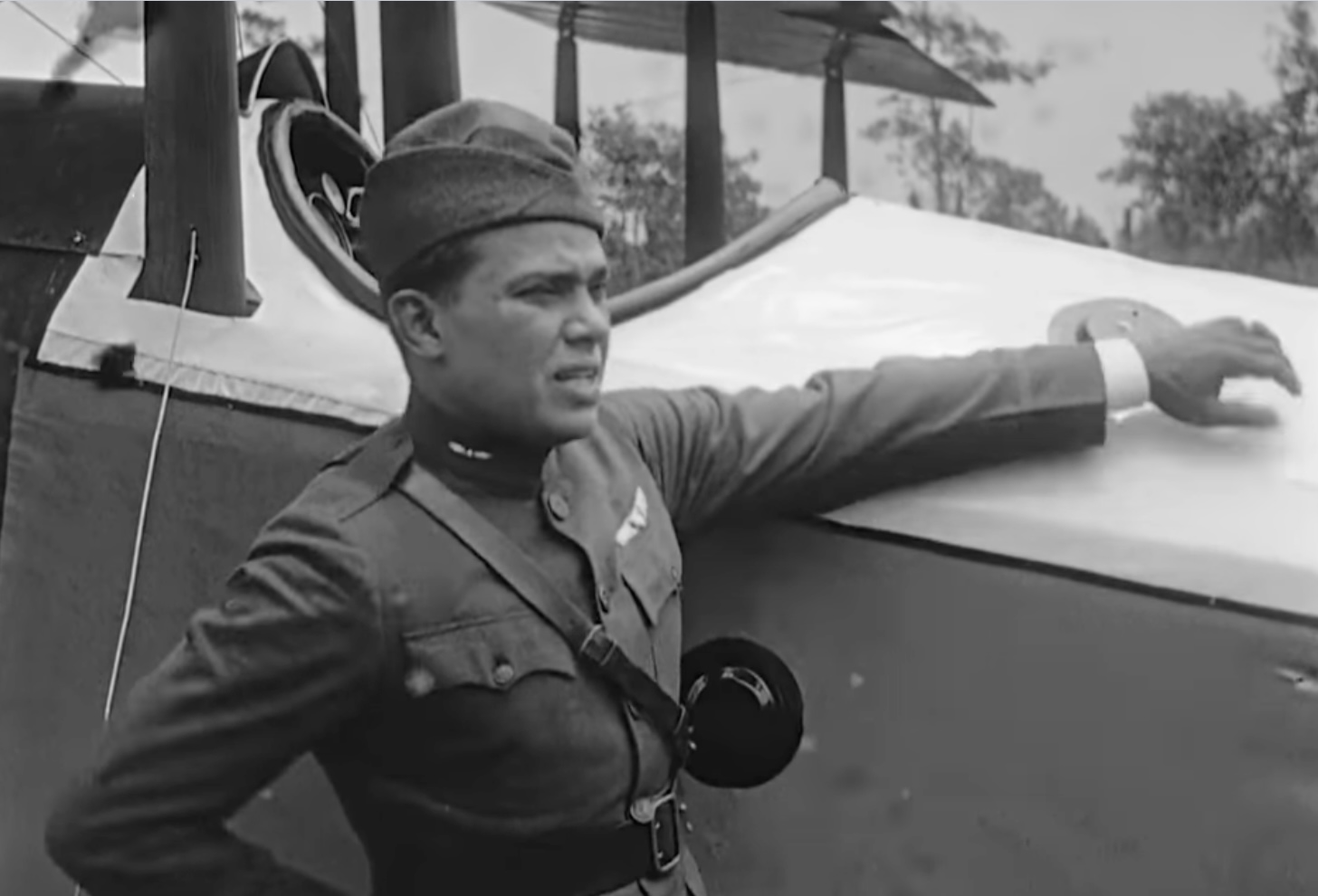
Laurence Criner in The Flying Ace

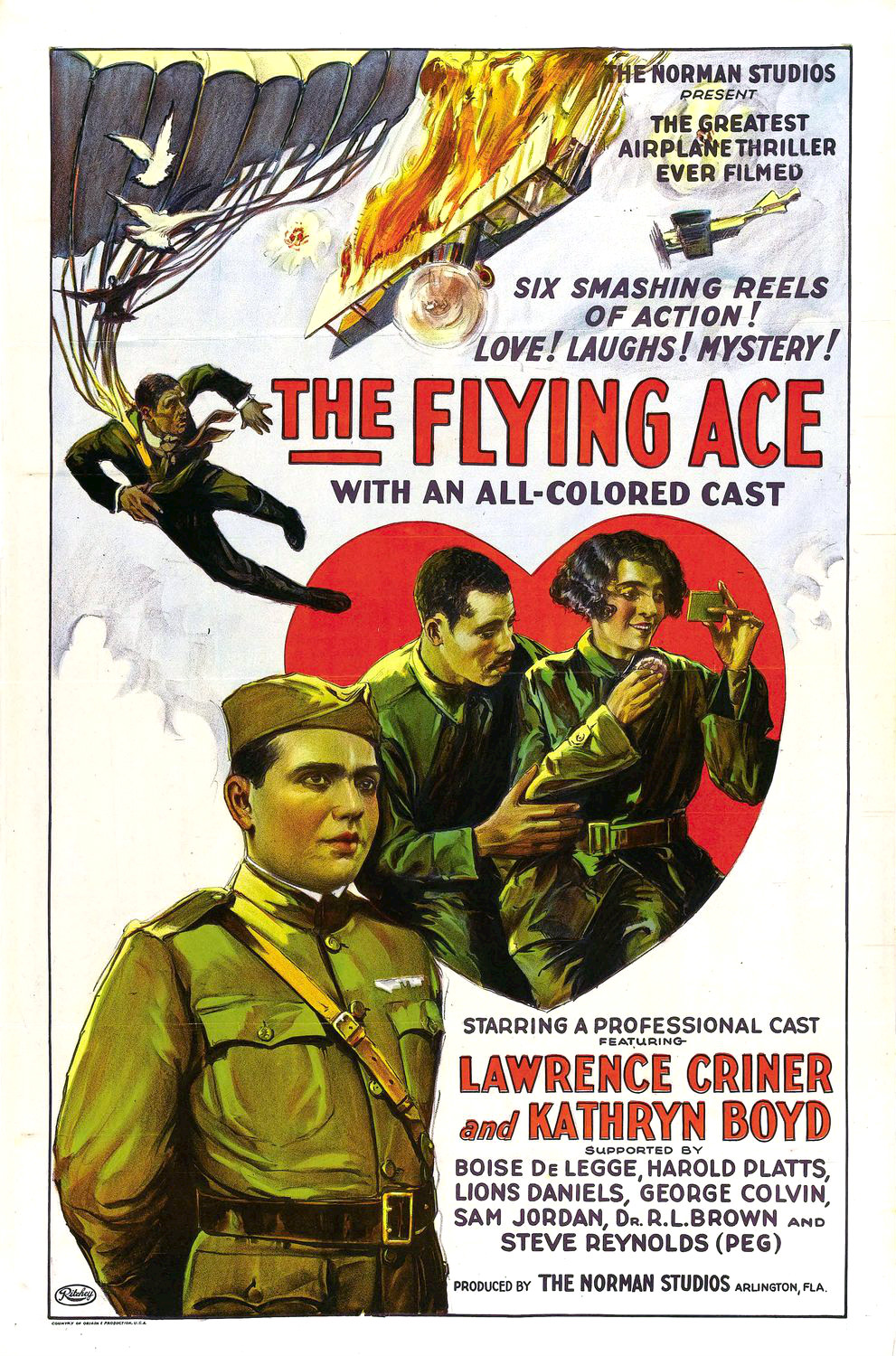
Poster for The Flying Ace

Laurence Criner (19 July 1898 – 8 March 1965) born John Laurence Criner, occasionally credited as J. Lawrence Criner, was an actor in the United States. An African-American, he had numerous film roles including as the male lead and star.

He was a member of the Lafayette Players and worked at Norman Studios in Jacksonville, Florida where he starred in two of their race films. He later worked at African American studio Million Dollar Productions.

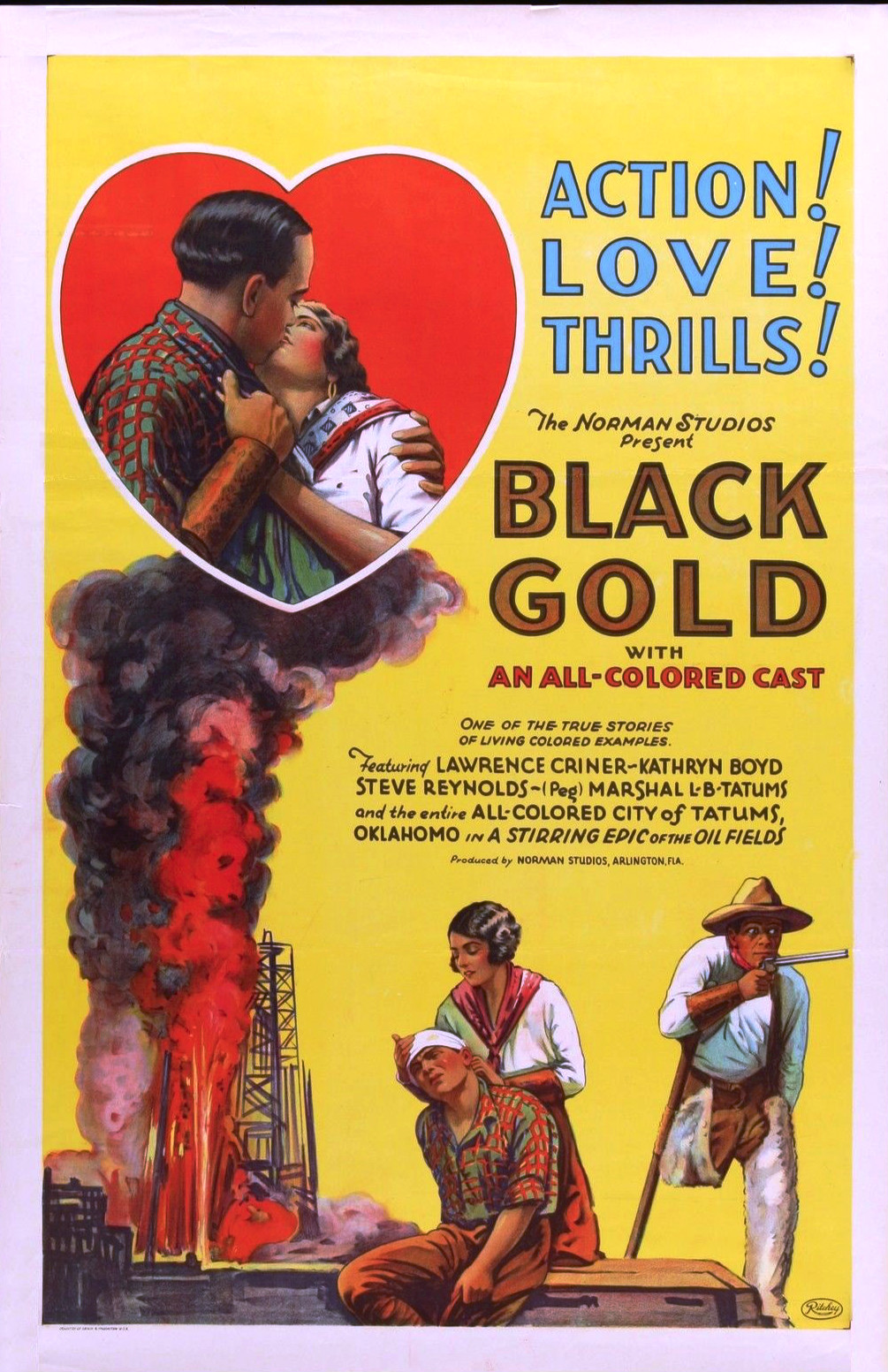
Poster for Black Gold (1928 film)

The Smithsonian Institution has a lobby card for The Flying Ace. The Library of Congress has a movie poster of Life Goes On that features an insetimage of Criner. The National Museum of African American History has a herald for Flying Ace.

== Theater ==
- Meek Mose (1928), credited as J. Lawrence Criner

== Filmography ==
- The Flying Ace (1926) as Capt. Blly Stokes
- The Millionaire (1927 film)
- Black Gold (1928 film)
- Black Moon (1934), as high priest Kala
- Bargain with Bullets (1937)
- The Duke Is Tops (1938) as Doc Dorando
- Gang Smashers
- Life Goes On (1938 film)
- Midnight Shadow (1939) Prince Alihabad
- Four Shall Die (1940) as Roger Fielding
- Gang War (1940 film)
- The Gang's All Here (1941 film) as Ham Shanks
- Up Jumped the Devil (1941) as Sheriff
- King of the Zombies (1941) as Dr. Couillie
- Freckles Comes Home (1942) as Roxbury B. Brown, III
- Law of the Jungle (film) (1942) as Chief Mojobo an Oxford graduate
- Miracle in Harlem (1948), as Albert Marshall
- What a Guy
- The Jackie Robinson Story
