= Clifford Sanforth =

Film director

Clifford Sanforth was a film director and producer in the United States. See also Clifford S. Elfelt, his birth name and the name he used prior to the 1930s. He produced and directed under that name through 1926.

Sanforth said he got the idea to make the film The Bandit of Sherwood Forest from his young son who saw The Adventures of Robin Hood (1938) asked his father whether Robin Hood had a son. Sanforth tracked down Paul Castleton, author of the 1941 novel Son of Robin Hood, and bought the film rights. In April 1944 Sanforth announced he would make a series of films about the son of Robin Hood for Republic Pictures starring archer Howard Hill.

In early 1945 the project moved to Columbia Pictures where Sanforth was to produce with Leonard Picker. MGM objected to the title The Son of Robin Hood claiming they had the rights to use the words "Robin Hood" as they had bought screen rights to an operetta of that name by Reginald de Koven. This resulted in Columbia deciding to use the title The Bandit of Sherwood Forest.

== Filmography ==
- Manhattan Butterfly (1935), co-producer
- Murder by Television (1935), director
- High Hat (1937), director
- Rich Relations (1937), director and producer
- I Demand Payment (1938), director
- One Dark Night (1939), producer
- Gang War, producer, a Million Dollar Productions film
- While Thousands Cheer (1940), a football themed film featuring UCLA star Kenny Washington,
- The Bandit of Sherwood Forest (1946)
