= Life Goes On (1938 film) =

Film by William Nolte

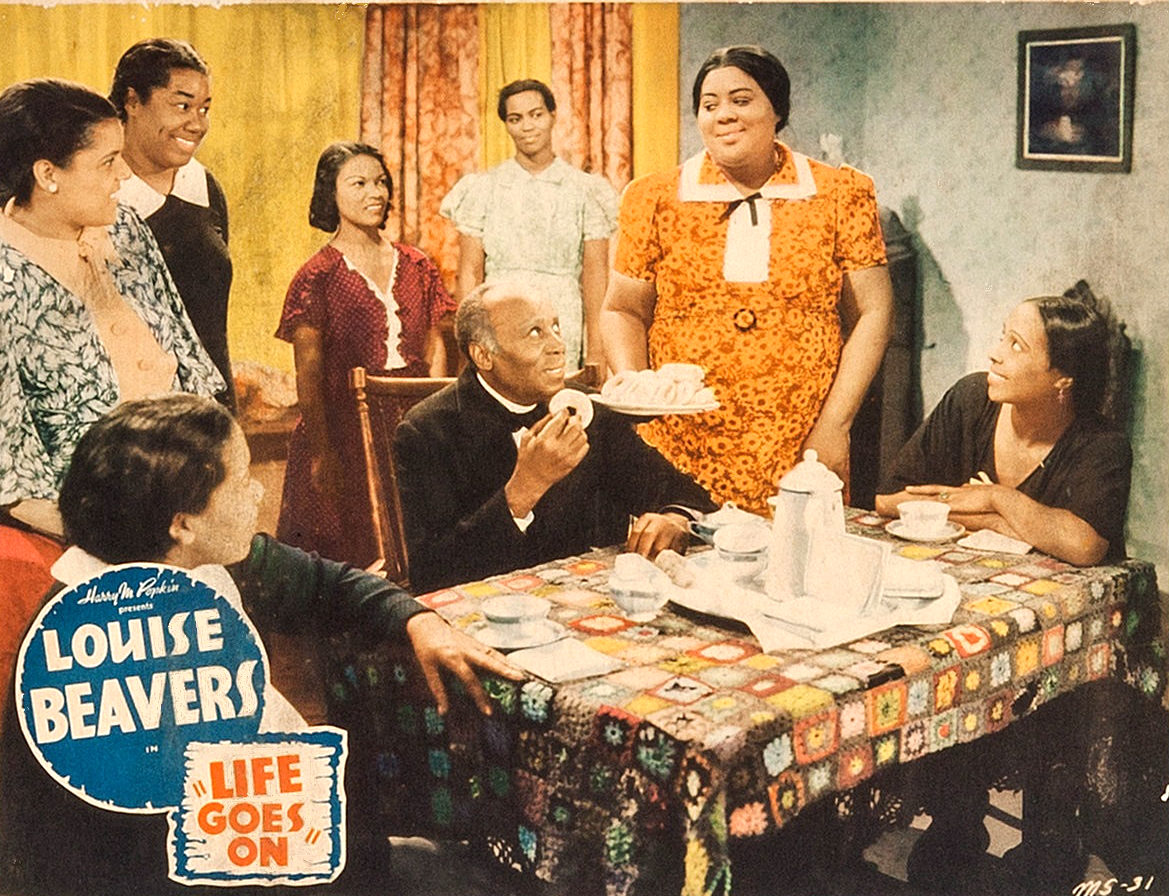
- Lobby card for Life Goes On
- Directed by: William Nolte
- Written by: Phil Dunham
- Produced by: Harry M. Popkin
- Starring: Louise Beavers; Edward Thompson; Reginald Fenderson; Laurence Criner
- Cinematography: Robert E. Cline
- Production company: Million Dollar Productions
- Distributed by: Million Dollar Productions
- Release date: April 1, 1938
- Running time: 80 minutes
- Country: United States
- Language: English

Life Goes On (reissued in 1944 as His Harlem Wife) is a 1938 crime drama directed by William Nolte and starring Louise Beavers, Edward Thompson, Reginald Fenderson, and Laurence Criner. It was produced by Million Dollar Productions, which created race films with African-American casts for distribution to "colored only" theaters during the years of segregation.

The Library of Congress has a movie poster promoting Life Goes On that features inset images of Laurence Criner and Louise Beavers.

== Plot summary ==
A mother raises two sons. One becomes a lawyer and the other a criminal.

== Cast ==
- Louise Beavers as Sally Weston
- Edward Thompson as Bob Weston
- Reginald Fenderson as Henry Weston, aka Monte Howard
- Laurence Criner as Bull Connors
- Monte Hawley as District Attorney
- Hope Bennet as Betty
