= Frank Sebastian's Cotton Club =

Night club in California (1926–1938)

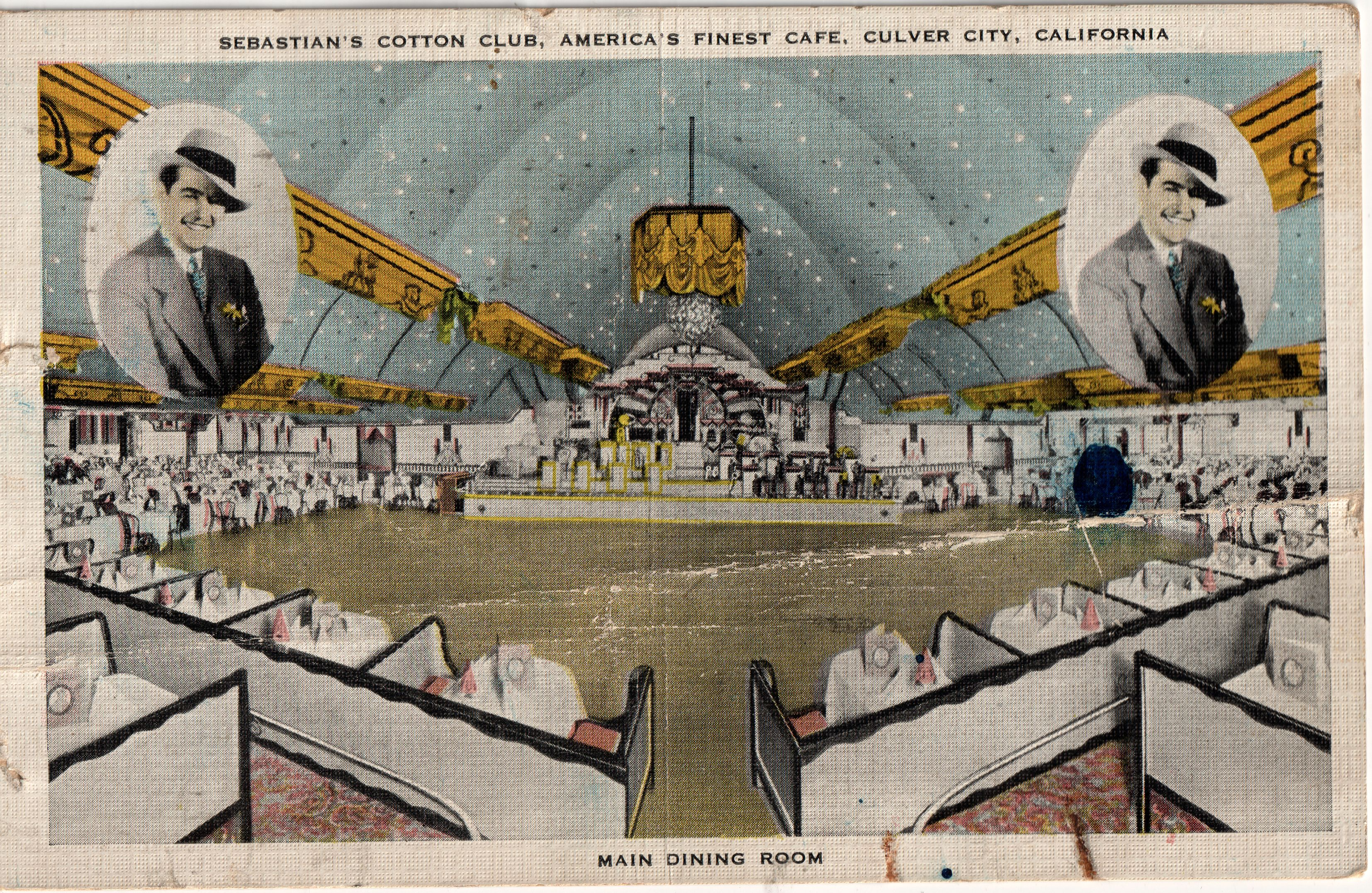
Main dining room and Frank Sebastian on a 1930s advertising postcard

Frank Sebastian's Cotton Club was a night club in Culver City, California, United States, located at the intersection of Washington Boulevard and National, near what is now Culver City station. Sebastian ran the club from 1926 until 1938. Performers at the club included jazz musicians like Louis Armstrong and Lionel Hampton. According to a Daily News article published in 1953, the music was in part intended to cover up the sound of the illegal casino operating upstairs.

== See also ==
- Leroy Broomfield
