= Polygamy (film) =

1936 film by Patrick Carlyle

Polygamy, also released as Illegal Wives, is an American film produced in 1936 and released with a world premiere in Detroit in 1937. Ted Toddy was involved in efforts to distribute the film which did not receive approval until 1939 following lengthy correspondence with censors and edits to the film. Patrick Carlyle directed. Scenes from the film were cut by censors. One censor wrote "We disliked this picture very much and we tried to find some way to reject it, but, after it was cut in a number of spots, we felt that we could not, in conscience, reject it, simply because we didn't like it." The Motion Picture Association of America has correspondence with censors about the film. Unusual Pictures produced the film.

J. D. Kendis purchased rights to the film and released it as Illegal Wives.

According to IMDb, director Pat Carlyle was born April 23, 1900, in Los Angeles as Raymond Carlyle Plotts and became an actor, producer, writer, and director of films. Frank Pharr was married to Three Stooges actress Symona Boniface.

Joseph Breen was involved in correspondence about censoring the film.

== Cast ==
- Bruce Wyndham as Jim Blackton
- Ann Marien as Ruth Miller, IMDb lists this as her only known film role
- Charles Maurice as Bishop Ross Miller
- Frank Pharr Simms as Lank Smith
- Ethel Clark as Myra Smith, first wife
