= Mantan Messes Up =

Film produced in 1946 in the United States

- Directed by: Sam Newfield
- Written by: Fred Myton
- Produced by: Jed Buell
- Starring: Mantan Moreland
- Cinematography: Jack Greenhalgh
- Production company: Lucky Star Production Company
- Distributed by: Toddy Pictures Company
- Release date: 1946
- Running time: 62 minutes
- Country: United States
- Language: English

Mantan Messes Up is a 1946 film produced in the United States. It stars Mantan Moreland. The film was directed by Sam Newfield. The film was produced by Lucky Star Production Company. It was advertised as having an "All Colored Cast". The Museum of the Moving Image has a still from the film.

Appearances in the film by Lena Horne and Nina Mae McKinney may have been clipped from am earlier film released by Toddy Pictures.

== Cast ==
- Mantan Moreland as Office boy
- Monte Hawley as Office manager, Mr. Hawley
- Jo Rhetta as Secretary
- Doryce Bradley as Dancer
- Lola Carrington as Wife
- Raymond Harris
- Lena Horne
- Eddie Green
- Buck and Bubbles
- Nina Mae McKinney
- Red Caps
- Neva Peoples
- Bo Jinkins
- Four Tones
