= Monte Hawley =

American actor

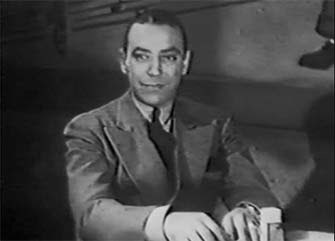
- Hawley as "Lefty" in the 1938 film Gang Smashers
- Born: 25 October 1901; Chicago, Illinois, United States
- Died: 30 November 1950 (aged 49); New York City, New York. United States
- Occupation: Actor
- Years active: 1923–1948
- Notable work: Mantan Messes Up; Look-Out Sister; Double Deal; Mystery in Swing

Monte Hawley (25 October 1901 – 30 November 1950) was an American actor from Chicago, Illinois.

== Biography ==
He began his entertainment career as one of the original Lafayette Players. He studied under Richard B. Harrison and, after moving to New York City, acted in works on Broadway. He then moved to Hollywood and appeared in movies, including Oscar Micheaux's first film production. He was an actor in, and stage manager for, the original traveling production of the play Anna Lucasta. According to the Philadelphia Tribune, Hawley was considered one of the most prominent Black "stage and screen actors".

He was in several theatrical productions on Broadway.

Hawley died on November 30, 1950, in New York City.

== Filmography ==
- A Son of Satan (1924)
- Life Goes On (1938), as District Attorney
- The Duke Is Tops (1938), as George Marshall
- Double Deal (1939), as Jim McCoy
- Reform School (1939), as Jackson
- Four Shall Die (1940), as Dr. Hugh Leonard (credited as Monty Hawley)
- Mystery in Swing (1940), as Biff Boyd
- Am I Guilty? (1940), as Tracy
- Gang War (1940), as Bill
- Lucky Ghost (1942), as Masher
- Mr. Washington Goes to Town (1942), as Stiletto
- Tall, Tan, and Terrific (1946), as "Handsome" Harry Hansom
- Mantan Messes Up (1946), as Monte
- What a Guy (1948)
- Miracle in Harlem (1948), as Lieutenant Renard
