= Reform School (film) =

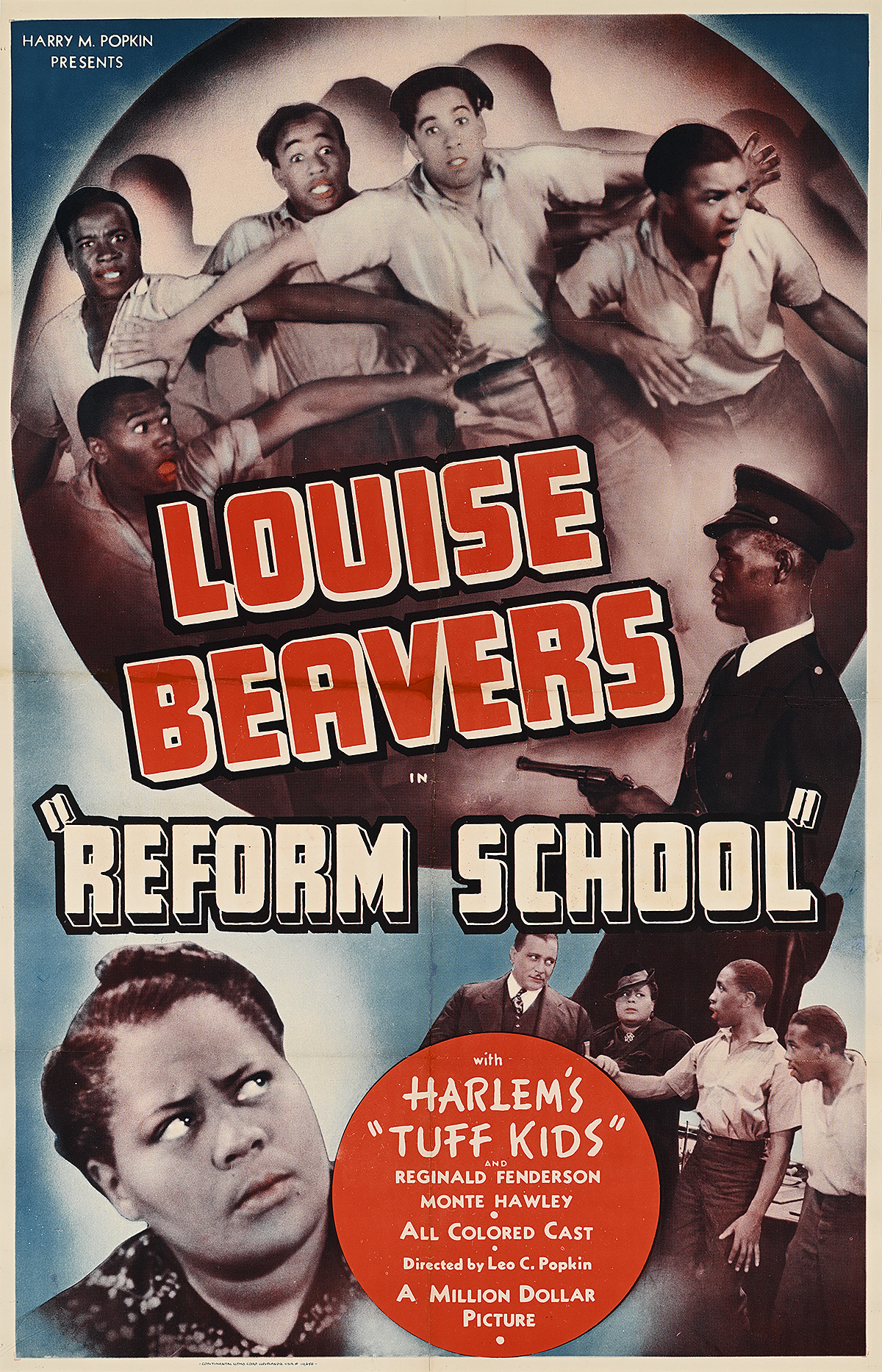
- Original poster under the title Reform School
- Directed by: Leo C. Popkin
- Written by: Joseph O'Donnell; Hazel Barnes Jamieson
- Screenplay by: Zella Young
- Produced by: Harry M. Popkin
- Starring: Louise Beavers; Reginald Fenderson; Monte Hawley
- Cinematography: William Hyer
- Edited by: Bart Rauw
- Music by: Lou Frohman
- Distributed by: Million Dollar Productions, Inc.
- Release date: April 27, 1939
- Running time: 82 mins
- Country: United States
- Language: English

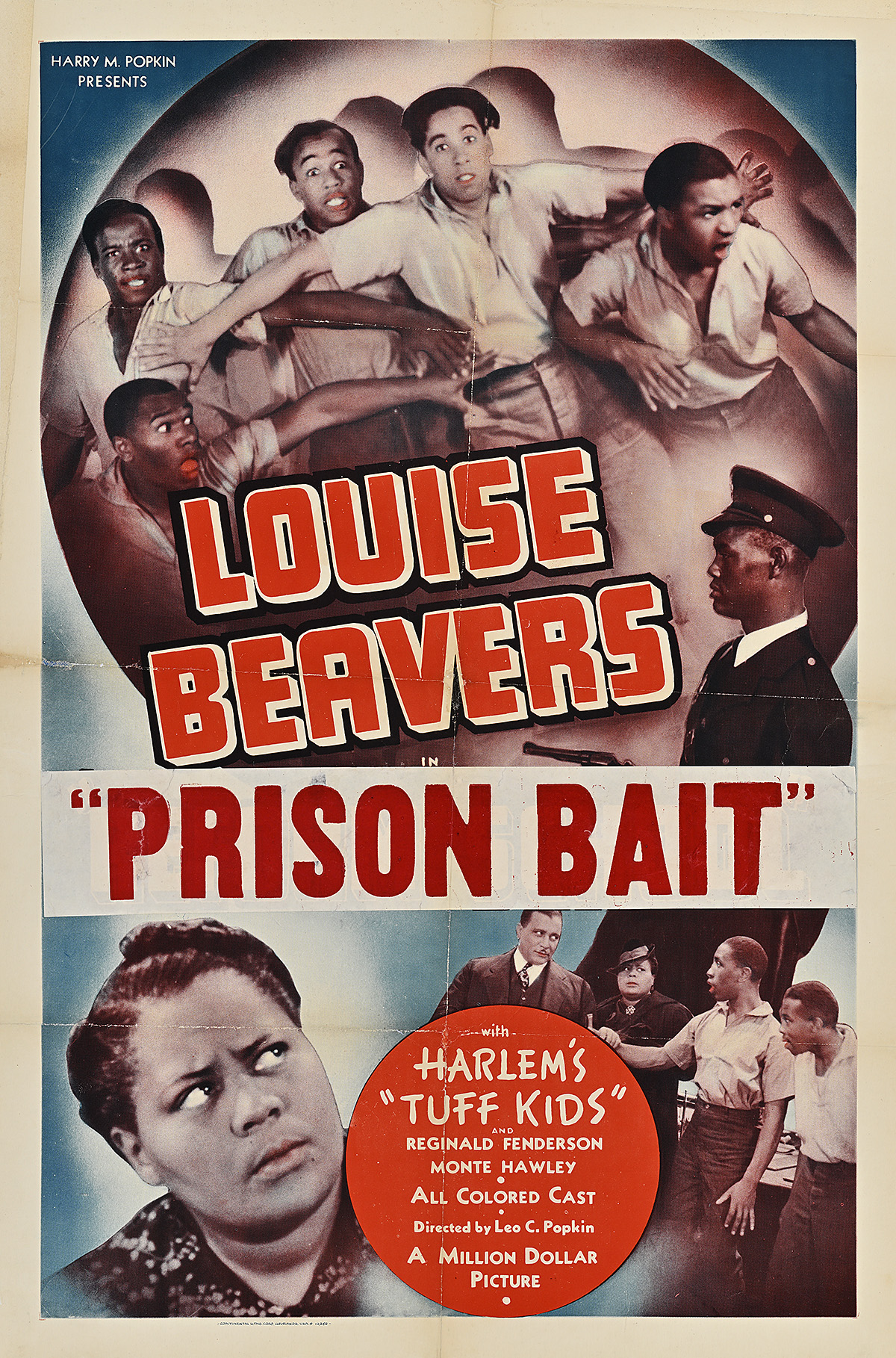
The poster for the 1944 rerelease is a minimal rework of the original 1939 poster, with only the title changed.

Reform School is a 1939 Million Dollar Productions American film produced by Harry M. Popkin, directed by Leo C. Popkin, written by Joseph O'Donnell and Hazel Jamieson and starring Louise Beavers.

In 1944, the film was rereleased as Prison Bait.

== Plot ==
Beavers plays Mother Barton, a probation officer of a large city who believes in a plan for an "honor system" at a reform school. When the previous superintendent of the school is ousted, she becomes superintendent and must address a brutal guard, the previous superintendent's henchmen and students at the school.

The film marked the debut of the Harlem Tuff Kids, a group that included Eugene Jackson, DeForrest Covan, Eddie Lynn and Bob Simmons. The group also appeared in the 1942 film Take My Life.

In 2022, a print restored by the Academy Film Archive premiered on the Turner Classic Movies television channel.

== Cast ==
- Louise Beavers as Mother Barton
- Reginald Fenderson as Freddie Gordon
- Monte Hawley as head guard Jackson
- Maceo Sheffield as Superintendent Stone
- Robert Webb
- Paul White (actor)
- Harlem Tuff Kids
