= Up Jumped the Devil =

1941 film

- Directed by: William Beaudine
- Starring: Mantan Moreland
- Release date: 1941
- Running time: 62 minutes
- Country: United States
- Language: English

Up Jumped the Devil is a 1941 American comedy film directed by William Beaudine and starring Mantan Moreland.

== Plot ==
While desperately looking for jobs to avoid being arrested for vagrancy, recent parolees Jefferson and Washington notice that the wealthy Mrs. Wendell Brown is hiring a butler and a maid. Jefferson convinces Washington to dress up as a woman and take the maid's job while he will be hired as the butler; although reluctant and uncooperative, Washington eventually agrees to keep his dress on so as to avoid nudity. As the duo hitchhike to Mrs. Brown's, where they are to work at her "Aid to Abyssinia" bazaar, Bad News Johnson, a crook whom they met in jail, picks them up and offers them information on how he is planning to scam Mrs. Brown, but they decline, declaring they experienced enough of prison life. At the bazaar, the male guests flirt with Washington, while Bad News, dressed as a soothsayer named "Swamee Reever", pretends to read the women's fortunes while stealing their jewels. After Washington, an incorrigible dice shooter, wins the men's fancy clothes in a game of craps with his "crooked dice" and dresses himself in men's clothing, he observes Bad News telling Mrs. Brown's fortune and then stealing her pearl necklace. Bad News warns Washington against telling anyone about the theft, and when Mrs. Brown's husband unsuccessfully searches both men, Washington keeps quiet. Jefferson shows Washington where the necklace has been hidden, and the two steal it and then refuse to return it to the angry Bad News until the police arrive and catch him red-handed.

== Cast ==
- Mantan Moreland as Washington.
- Maceo Bruce Sheffield as Bad News Johnson
- Shelton Brooks as Jefferson
- Laurence Criner as Sheriff
- Myrtle Fortune
- Patsy Hunter
- Millie Monroe
- Suzette Harbin
- Avanelle Harris
