= Dandridge Sisters =

1930s US musical trio

The Dandridge Sisters were an American all-girl singing trio, started in 1934 in Los Angeles, California, and ended in 1940, comprising the sisters Vivian and Dorothy Dandridge together with their friend Etta Jones (not the more well-known jazz vocalist Etta Jones, her namesake). They had a short period of fame traveling around the United States performing for night clubs, theatres, radio shows, and eventually left the U.S. to tour in Europe. Dorothy Dandridge decided to become a solo artist, the band split, and each woman then pursued projects individually.

== Rise to fame ==
Both Vivian and Dorothy Dandridge originally made up the band The Wonder Children, organized by their mother Ruby Dandridge (also a performer) in Cleveland, Ohio. When they added Etta Jones to the group, they changed their name to The Dandridge Sisters and moved to Los Angeles. They originally began performing as aspiring dancers after studying at the Loretta Butler School of Dance and the Nash Dancing Company in Los Angeles as well as the Mary Bruce School of Ballet in Chicago, Illinois. However, the trio entered a radio show contest at KNX Radio in Los Angeles just for the fun and ended up winning over more than 30 white contestants. This win brought them recognition in the music world as singers. They began performing shows around Los Angeles in various night clubs and theatres, and then were invited by Joe Glazer (the promoter for the Cotton Club) to perform at the Cotton Club in New York City in 1936. They moved to New York with Ruby, Vivian being 15, Dorothy 14, and Etta 17 at the time. They were so well-liked at the Cotton Club that they were given a regular spot on the show in 1939, performing in their years at that popular Harlem venue alongside such famous African-American artists and entertainers as Cab Calloway, W.C. Handy, and the Nicholas Brothers.

== Stardom ==
The trio became highly recognized as a musical trio at the Cotton Club and often were compared to the Andrews Sisters. Although the Dandridge Sisters studied as dancers, their music career led them to study music technically so as to be stable artists. After working in New York, they began to be chaperoned by their aunt Geneva Williams rather than their mother. They moved to Hawaii for five months performing a show, and then moved to Hollywood to work on musical shorts. In Hollywood, they worked for MGM and appeared in Going Places (1938) featuring Louis Armstrong. They then went back to New York to perform at the Cotton Club and other nightclubs and theatres. They eventually went to Europe in 1939 to perform and travel around in cities in England and Ireland. They performed at the London Palladium in a show with the Jack Harris Orchestra and comedian Jack Durant. When they returned to the U.S., they hit the height of their stardom in 1940. They toured with Jimmie Lunceford and his big band orchestra, and recorded four songs with them.

== Personnel ==
Vivian Dandridge, who was a year older than her sister and two younger than Etta, acted as the leader of the group. She arranged all the meetings, rehearsals, and was its spokeswoman. The sisters all mentioned that they spent much of their spare time (when not performing) dancing and making scrapbooks. The three were all seemingly religious (Etta was Roman Catholic) and attended church each Sunday in every city they visited. They claimed to make all of their decisions as a musical trio after consulting in a group, but on the whole, the three girls were similar. They claimed to have very similar opinions on everything including the way they dressed and their daily habits. They also said that they all preferred to be successful women in their musical career rather than seek love and marriage.

=== Vivian Dandridge ===
After the trio stopped performing together in 1940, Vivian performed in a few movie roles. She was an extra in the movie Stormy Weather (1943), and the voice of "So White" in a controversial cartoon short Coal Black and de Sebben Dwarfs (1943). She then released an album titled The Look of Love in 1968, but it was unsuccessful. She lived in Seattle for the last eight years of her life, but changed her stage name to Marina Rozell after her third marriage. She seldom performed any longer except at open-mic nights. She died at the age of 70 in 1991 from a stroke.

=== Dorothy Dandridge ===
Dorothy often went by the nickname Dot while in the Dandridge Sisters. After breaking up the group in 1940, Dorothy became the most successful of the trio. She started in minor roles in Hollywood films and making popular soundies, but moved into an Academy Award nominated leading lady, becoming the first African-American woman to receive a nomination for an Best Actress for her title role in Carmen Jones in 1954. She starred as Bess in the lavish Porgy and Bess (1959), after which a variety of factors combined to send her career downhill. She first married Harold Nicholas, the younger of the Nicholas Brothers specialty dance act, bearing a handicapped daughter before their divorce. Her marriage to Jack Denison also ended poorly, and she developed an alcohol problem. On September 8, 1965, she was found dead in her apartment from an overdose of barbiturates, ruled accidental.

=== Etta Jones ===
Etta Jones, a native of Lake Charles, Louisiana, was born in 1919 (but often is confused with the more famous jazz singer Etta Jones born in 1928). She attended both of Dorothy Dandridge’s weddings. Little other information is known about her whereabouts after the splitting up of the Dandridge Sisters. It is known that she sang with the Jimmy Lunceford orchestra for some time, and her first husband, trumpeter Gerald Wilson, was a member of the group. After retiring to raise a family, Etta later worked for the Los Angeles County Department of Parks and Recreation, teaching dance to young children in the parks and playgrounds. She died of heart failure in Los Angeles on June 29, 1997.

== Film ==
A list of known film performances of the Dandridge Sisters includes:

- The Big Broadcast of 1936 (1936)
- A Day at the Races (1937)
- Easy to Take (1937)
- It Can't Last Forever (1937)
- Going Places (1938)
- Snow Gets in Your Eyes (1938)
- Irene (1940)

== Recordings ==
The only known recorded songs that the Dandridge Sisters made on vinyl were "Undecided" (1939), and "If I Were Sure of You" recorded for the Parlophone label while they were in London, and "Minnie the Moocher is Dead", "You Ain’t Nowhere", "Ain’t Goin to Study War No More", and "That’s Your Red Wagon", recorded in 1940 with Jimmie Lunceford and his big band orchestra.
