= Vivian Dandridge =

American actress and singer (1921–1991)

- Dandridge in 1951
- Born: Vivian Alferetta Dandridge; April 22, 1921; Cleveland, Ohio, U.S.
- Died: October 26, 1991 (aged 70); Seattle, Washington, U.S.
- Other names: Marina Rozell; Vivian Stead; Vivian Dandridge–Friedrich
- Occupations: Actress; singer; dancer
- Years active: 1933–1970
- Spouses: Jack Montgomery (m. 1942; div. 1943) Warren Bracken (m. 1945; ann. 1945) Ralph Bledsoe (m. 1946; div. 1948) Forace Stead (m. 1951; div. 1953) Gustav Friedrich (m. 1958; div. 1968)
- Partner: Emmett "Babe" Wallace
- Children: 1
- Mother: Ruby Dandridge
- Relatives: Nayo Wallace (granddaughter); Dorothy Dandridge (sister)

Vivian Alferetta Dandridge (April 22, 1921 – October 26, 1991) was an American singer, actress and dancer. She was the older sister of actress and singer Dorothy Dandridge and the daughter of actress Ruby Dandridge. Dandridge was a member of the popular Dandridge Sisters musical group, along with Etta Jones and Dorothy Dandridge, from 1934 until the group disbanded in 1940. She went on to appear in minor roles on films and television from 1940 through the early 1960s.

== Early life and career ==
Dandridge was born in Cleveland, Ohio, to Cyril Dandridge, and the former Ruby Jean Butler, an aspiring entertainer. Dandridge's parents separated shortly before the birth of her sister Dorothy. Initially, Ruby Dandridge put her two girls to work performing acrobatics, songs, and skits. She billed them as the "Wonder Children". Realizing the potential success of her girls (and acknowledging her chance of stardom in the entertainment industry was at best, limited), Ruby and her girlfriend Geneva Williams decided to have her daughters embark on a tour of the United States. Under Neva's tutelage, the Wonder Children earned $400–$500 per appearance during the late 1920s, touring through Tennessee, South Carolina, Georgia and many other states. Neva accompanied the girls on piano as well as acted as their manager and was a particularly aggressive disciplinarian. Both Dorothy and Vivian suffered from her angry outbursts, which were frequent and severe.

Because their income was more important to the family than their education, Dorothy and Vivian did not attend regular classes at school until the 8th grade, instead relying on tutors (since they were the primary breadwinners of the family). After the stock market crash in 1929, the Wonder Children were added to the long list of the unemployed. Ruby Dandridge, still clinging to the hopes of a film career for herself and her daughters, bought four bus tickets and moved the family to Los Angeles. After immersing herself into the professional community of black Hollywood, Ruby found limited opportunities for herself or her girls. After Clarence Muse, a working black actor in Hollywood (who befriended the family) told Ruby that her daughters were unlikely to meet with success in California, she enrolled them in a dancing school run by Laurette Butler.

=== The Dandridge Sisters ===
In California, the Dandridge daughters befriended another girl, Etta Jones, and began to sing together. After Jones' father heard them sing, Ruby Dandridge decided that the three should form a singing group. Thus, the Dandridge Sisters were born. While Neva and Ruby gained bit parts in films (Neva appeared as a maid in the Shirley Temple vehicle The Little Colonel, the Dandridge Sisters began appearing in musical sequences of films and toured over the United States, sharing bills with Nat King Cole, Mantan Moreland, and dancer Marie Bryant. The female trio was a sort of black Andrews Sisters, singing songs in three part harmony. They eventually became headliners at the Cotton Club in Harlem, New York. They even appeared in a short-run Broadway musical revue, Swingin' the Dream, in 1939, at the Center Theater. The Dandridge Sisters also toured in London and Hawaii, and recorded four tracks with well-known big band leader Jimmie Lunceford and his orchestra: "You Ain't Nowhere", "Minnie the Moocher Is Dead", "I Ain't Gonna Study War No More," and a minor hit, "That's Your Red Wagon". After touring for a year and a half, however, the Dandridge Sisters group abruptly disbanded, after Dorothy was determined to become an actress, unsatisfied with just appearances in occasional soundies or bit parts in Hollywood films. Dorothy detested life on the road and was certain she could find bigger success as a dramatic actress. This left Vivian in a desperate financial situation. She attempted to find work in clubs, but many were not interested. She did, however, find employment as an occasional actress in films but did not achieve the same level of success as her sister Dorothy.

=== Solo career, film and television ===
Dandridge appeared in some minor film roles: she co-starred with Frances Dee as native girl Melisse in the 1943 classic I Walked with a Zombie and appeared alongside her sister in 1953's Bright Road, where she played a small role of schoolteacher Ms. Nelson (she was uncredited in both films) and acted as Dorothy's hairdresser on the film. She appeared with the Dandridge Sisters in musical sequences of the films The Big Broadcast of 1936 (with George Burns and Gracie Allen), A Day at the Races (with the Marx Brothers), It Can't Last Forever (with Ralph Bellamy and Betty Furness), Irene (with Ray Milland, Anna Neagle, and Billie Burke) and Going Places (with Louis Armstrong and Maxine Sullivan). She also appeared in the soundie Snow Gets in Your Eyes as a member of the Dandridge Sisters and as the voice of "So White" in the controversial cartoon Coal Black and de Sebben Dwarfs opposite her mother Ruby Dandridge. Dandridge appeared as an uncredited extra in 1943's Stormy Weather. In the summer of 1955, Dandridge replaced Thelma Carpenter in the Broadway play Ankles Aweigh. She moved to the Alvin Hotel in New York City, but after this engagement she largely disappeared from show business. Dandridge attended the Academy Awards in 1955 with Dorothy Dandridge when Dorothy was nominated for Best Actress for her role in Carmen Jones.

== Disappearance ==
By 1956, friends and family members were concerned for the welfare of Dandridge, as she moved away and went into seclusion. Her sister Dorothy hired a private detective to find her missing sister, but to no avail; Dorothy later found out that her sister was in the south of France trying to find work. Later, she found out that her sister was residing in New York City. At this point, Dorothy and Vivian did not remain in contact, though Dorothy sometimes provided financial assistance to Vivian and her son Michael Wallace. Other than the occasional telegram, Dorothy and Vivian remained estranged. Upon Dorothy's death in 1965, Dandridge could not bear to attend the funeral. Instead, she disappeared from the public eye.

== Solo recording ==
In 1968, Vivian signed a recording contract with Jubilee Records and released a jazz LP, The Look of Love, that same year. The album was produced by Bob Stephens and conducted by Charles Coleman, and included such tracks as "Love is Blue", "Try to Remember", "Sunny", "Strange Fruit", and "Lover Man". On the cover, Vivian is lying on a sofa, looking pensive while holding a snifter of brandy. The album was not successful.

== The Look of Love ==
No.	Title	Writer(s)	Length
1.	"Love Is Blue"	André Popp	3:07
2.	"Try to Remember"	Tom Jones	3:12
3.	"Strange Fruit"	Abel Meeropol	2:50
4.	"Sunny"	Bobby Hebb	2:35
5.	"I Cover the Waterfront"	Johnny Green and Edward Heyman	2:28
6.	"The Look of Love"	Burt Bacharach and Hal David	2:00
7.	"You're My Thrill"	Jay Gorney and Sidney Clare	2:45
8.	"A Coat of Laughter"	Melba Liston	2:24
9.	"Lover Man (Oh, Where Can You Be?)"	Jimmy Davis, Roger "Ram" Ramirez and James Sherman	2:20
10.	"Trav'lin' Light"	Trummy Young and Jimmy Mundy	2:30
11.	"You Don't Know What Love Is"	Don Raye and Gene de Paul	3:10
12.	"Lover, Come Back to Me"	Sigmund Romberg and Oscar Hammerstein II	2:15

== Personal life ==
Dandridge, under the alias "Marina Rozell," later settled in Seattle, Washington, where she lived for the rest of her life. Author Donald Bogle did an interview with Dandridge discussing her sister and mother in 1991; later that year when Bogle returned, he found that Dandridge had died of a massive stroke. Dandridge was married at least five times: Jack Montgomery (1942–1943), Warren Bracken (1945–1945), Ralph Bledsoe (1946–48), Forace Stead (1951–1953) and Gustav Friedrich (1958–1968). Dandridge was also romantically linked to actor Emmett "Babe" Wallace, with whom she had a son, Michael Emmett Wallace. Dandridge did not attend the funeral of her sister, admitting that it was just too painful to return. She said, "I grieved in my own way, in my privacy. Dottie knew that I loved her." Vivian later rekindled a relationship with her mother (albeit an adversarial one) until her mother died penniless in a Los Angeles nursing home of a massive heart attack in 1987. Dandridge's granddaughter, Nayo Wallace, is also an actress, appearing on television series, film and on Broadway.

== Death ==
Dandridge died on October 26, 1991 at age 70 after suffering a stroke.
