= Coal Black and de Sebben Dwarfs =

1943 film by Robert Clampett

- Title card
- Directed by: Robert Clampett
- Story by: Warren Foster
- Based on: Snow White by Brothers Grimm
- Produced by: Leon Schlesinger
- Starring: Vivian Dandridge; Leo Watson; Mel Blanc; Lillian Randolph; Darrell Payne; (all uncredited)
- Music by: Carl W. Stalling
- Animation by: Rod Scribner
- Color process: Technicolor
- Production company: Leon Schlesinger Productions
- Distributed by: Warner Bros. Pictures
- Release date: January 16, 1943
- Running time: 7 min
- Country: United States
- Language: English

Coal Black and de Sebben Dwarfs is a 1943 American animated comedy short film directed by Robert Clampett. The short was released on January 16, 1943. It is part of the Merrie Melodies series.

The film is an all-black parody of the Brothers Grimm fairy tale Snow White, known to audiences at the time from Walt Disney Productions' animated feature Snow White and the Seven Dwarfs. The stylistic portrayal of the characters is an example of "darky" iconography, which was widely accepted in American society at the time. As such, it is one of the most controversial cartoons in the classic Warner Bros. library, being one of the Censored Eleven. The cartoon has been rarely seen on television since it was pulled from circulation in 1968 and has never been officially released on home video.

== Plot ==
Coal Black opens in front of a fireplace with a red-tinted silhouette of a large woman holding a young child in her lap. The little black girl asks her "mammy" to tell her the story of "So White an' de Sebben Dwarfs". "Mammy" begins:

Well, once there was a mean ol' queen. And she lived in a gorgeous castle. And was that ole' gal rich! She was just as rich as she was mean! She had everythang!

The rich, Wicked Queen then appears, depicted as a "food hoarder", with a large repository of items that were on ration during World War II: rubber, sugar, gin ("Eli Whitney's Cotton Gin" brand) and more. After stuffing her face with candies (from a box marked "Chattanooga Chew-Chews"), she asks her magic mirror to "send her a prince 'bout six feet tall", but when Prince Chawmin' arrives in his flashy car, he declares "that mean ol' queen sho' is a fright / but her gal So White is dyn-a-mite!" Finding So White hard at work doing the laundry, the prince takes her hand and the two swing out into a wild jitterbug. The queen sees this, calls, and hires "Murder, Incorporated" to "black-out So White". She eats the phone in frustration, as the assassins immediately arrive in a panel truck that advertises, "We rub out anybody for $1.00; Midgets: 1/2-price; Japs: free".

The assassins kidnap the girl, but after several unseen "favors" which make the would-be assassins very happy, slowly set her free in the woods unharmed. Just before they drive off, the assassins are seen covered with So White's lipstick all over their heads, an innuendo as to exactly how she earned her freedom. Wandering through the woods by herself, So White discovers a dwarf who hoots like an owl. In fright, she immediately lights up a lighter and reveals one of the dwarfs holding a rifle. He asked, "Who goes there, Friend or Foe?" She then runs the answer into the Sebben Dwarfs, seven diminutive army men in uniform who marched and sing "We're in the Army Now", with two dwarfs singing "it takes us cats ... to catch them rats" at the end, and So White declares in a 1940s swing-style singing voice, "I'm wacky over khaki now!" They immediately recruit her as their squad cook, and she spends her days "fryin' up eggs an' pork chops too" (to the tune of "Five O'Clock Whistle") for the hungry soldiers, as a sign which hangs from her outdoor antique stove reads, "Keep 'em frying", as a sendup of the World War II slogan, "Keep 'Em Flying".

Meanwhile, the queen has learned that So White is still alive, and pumps an apple full of poison (turning the red apple into a green apple) to give it to the girl and kill her. Four worms escape the apple as the queen injects it with poison, one carrying a sign that says "Refoogees", and one other thinks it smells like Limburger. The queen disguises herself as an old peddler woman as she arrives at the Sebben Dwarfs' camp, reveals a Jimmy Durante reference, and gives So White the poisoned apple (who immediately forced her to eat it). She gobbled the entire apple down. One of the seven dwarfs (modeled on the "Dopey" dwarf in Disney's film) sees her lying on the ground and alerts the others that the queen has caused So White to "kick the bucket" (with one other dwarf who immediately sticks his head out to repeat the response in a question while clucking like a chicken), as the situation forced the entire squad to rush, ramming over "Dopey", and hops into its vehicles (a Jeep, a "Beep", and, for "Dopey", a "Peep"). As the queen makes her escape over the hills, the dwarfs load a cannon with both a war shell and "Dopey". The shell sails over to the queen, stops in front of her in mid-air, opens, and "Dopey" appears, knocking the crone out with a normal-sized mallet.

Even though the queen has been defeated, So White is still dead to the world. The dwarfs' note, in spoken rhyme:

She's outta this world! She's stiff as wood!
She's got it bad, and that ain't good!
There's only one thing that'll remedy this
and dat's Prince Chawmin' and his Dynamite Kiss!

Upon the dwarfs' invoking his name, the prince jumps into the scene in a spotlight and promises to "give her a kiss / and it won't be a dud / I'll bring her to life with my special 'Rosebud'", a nod to Citizen Kane. Wiping his lip and leaning over the girl in preparation, Prince Chawmin proceeds to give So White a succession of highly aerobic kisses, practically swallowing the girl's face whole in trying to awaken her, but without any luck. Prince Chawmin' keeps frantically kissing So White while the dwarfs attempt to copy his actions (as his efforts are underscored by a solo from Eddie Beale's trumpet player), and the efforts literally take the life out of him as he first turns blue in the face (same to the dwarfs), before turning into a withered old, pale-faced man, shrugging his shoulders in defeat, with the dwarfs entirely falling and tumbling to the ground in relief. The "Dopey" dwarf then saunters over to So White, and, to the tune of "You're in the Army Now", lays a kiss on the girl so dynamic that not only does So White wake up, but her eyes become large as saucers and her pigtails fly straight up into the air (depicted in Rod Scribner's typically extreme animation style) as she jumps into the air.

The worn-out, tired, and aged Prince asks "Dopey", "Man, what you got that makes So White think you so hot?!" "Dopey" replies, "well, dat is a military secret", and lays another kiss on So White, which sends her pigtails sailing into the air again and causes the red ribbons on them to turn into twin American flags, to several notes of "Columbia, the Gem of the Ocean", and immediately after the kiss, So White and "Dopey" both show an obvious "afterglow" in their eyes and their smile. The film then fades to the standard Merrie Melodies "That's all, Folks!" end title text, superimposed over a shot of the little girl and her "mammy" from the opening scene.

== Production ==
In this version of the story, all of the characters are black, and speak all of their dialogue in rhyme. The story is set during World War II in the United States, and the original tale's fairy tale wholesomeness is replaced in this film by a hot jazz mentality and sexual overtones. Several scenes unique to Disney's film version of Snow White, such as the wishing-well sequence, the forest full of staring eyes, and the awakening kiss, are directly parodied in this film. The film was intended to have been named So White and de Sebben Dwarfs, which producer Leon Schlesinger thought was too close to the original film's actual title, and had changed to Coal Black and de Sebben Dwarfs.

Clampett intended Coal Black as both a parody of Snow White and a dedication to the all-black jazz musical films popular in the early 1940s (like Cabin in the Sky and Stormy Weather). In fact, the idea to produce Coal Black came to Clampett after he saw Duke Ellington's 1941 musical revue Jump for Joy, and Ellington and the cast suggested Clampett make a black musical cartoon. The Clampett unit made a couple of field trips to Club Alabam, a black club in the Los Angeles area, to gain a feel for the music and the dancing, and Clampett cast popular radio actors as the voices of his three main characters. The main character, So White, is voiced by Vivian Dandridge, sister of actress Dorothy Dandridge. Darrel Payne voices the Wicked Queen. Leo Watson is the voice of "Prince Chawmin'". The other characters, including the Sebben Dwarfs, are voiced by veteran Warner Bros. voice artist Mel Blanc.

Originally, Clampett wanted an all-black band to score the cartoon, the same way Max and Dave Fleischer had Cab Calloway and His Orchestra score the Betty Boop cartoons Minnie the Moocher, The Old Man of the Mountain, and their own version of Snow White. Schlesinger refused but reluctantly let Eddie Beals and his orchestra record the music for the final kiss sequence.

== Legacy ==
=== Race controversy ===
When the cartoon was released, reviews in the press were positive. Motion Picture Exhibitor said, "A satire on Snow White done in blackface, set in modern swing, this is the best in a long time. It's very funny." The Film Daily agreed, saying, "Set this one down as a rather amusing satire on Snow White and the Seven Dwarfs. All the characters in the latter are replaced by darkies... The dwarfs come to the rescue in a way that makes for numerous laughs."

In April 1943, the NAACP protested the caricatures which appeared in Coal Black and de Sebben Dwarfs, and called on Warner to withdraw it.

Coal Black and de Sebben Dwarfs is one of the "Censored Eleven": 11 Schlesinger/Warner Bros. cartoons produced at the height of the Golden Age of Hollywood animation based on its unflattering and stereotypical use of blackface. Because it was produced in America during World War II, there is also anti-Japanese sentiment: the firm "Murder Inc." advertises that it does not charge to kill "Japs".

The same basic stereotypical elements present in the earlier Censored Eleven films are also present in Coal Black, depicted with more detail and made to conform to Clampett's "wacky" directorial style. In Racism in American Popular Media, Behnken and Smithers assert, "The racism in Coal Black and de Sebben Dwarfs is unparalleled in cartoon history. This short throws virtually every black stereotype into the mix, beginning with the Mammy character, who, while in shadow, is clearly a large black woman with a distinct "Negroid" voice. The child is a big-cheeked pickanniny with a bow in her hair... The Prince is a similarly caricatured black man: he has straightened hair, wears a white zoot suit and a monocle, and has gold teeth (his two front teeth are dominoes). So White is portrayed as a hypersexual, big-bottomed younger black woman, with perky bosoms and revealing clothing. She is less representative of blackface characters and instead represents the black Jezebel or whore, voluptuous, lascivious and sexually available."

Clampett would revisit black jazz culture again in another 1943 Merrie Melodies cartoon, Tin Pan Alley Cats, which features a feline caricature of Fats Waller in a repurposing of the wacky fantasy world from Porky in Wackyland (during the opening sequence, the "Fats" cat is distracted by what appears to be So White). Clampett's colleague Friz Freleng directed a cartoon titled Goldilocks and the Jivin' Bears in 1944, essentially Coal Black remade with a different fairy tale, and Warner's director Chuck Jones directed a series of shorts starring a prepubescent African hunter named Inki from 1939 to 1950. Like Coal Black, Tin Pan Alley Cats and Goldilocks and the Jivin' Bears would also end up in the Censored Eleven.

Bob Clampett claimed in the cartoon's defense that;

In 1942, during the height of anti-Japanese sentiment during World War II, I was approached in Hollywood by the cast of an all-black musical off-broadway production called Jump For Joy while they were doing some special performances in Los Angeles. They asked me why there weren't any Warner's cartoons with black characters and I didn't have any good answer for that question. So we sat down together and came up with a parody of Disney's "Snow White" and "Coal Black" was the result. They did all the voices for that cartoon, even though Mel Blanc's contract with Warners gave him sole voice credit for all Warners cartoons by then. There was nothing racist or disrespectful toward blacks intended in that film at all, nor in Tin Pan Alley Cats which is just a parody of jazz piano great Fats Waller, who was always hamming into the camera during his musical films. Everybody, including blacks had a good time when these cartoons first came out. All the controversy about these two cartoons has developed in later years merely because of changing attitudes toward black civil rights that have happened since then.

=== Coal Black in later years ===
The racially stereotyped portrayals of African-Americans in Coal Black and the other "Censored Eleven" cartoons led to their being suppressed from television broadcast. In 1968, United Artists, which then owned the rights to the pre-August 1948 Warner Bros. cartoon library, officially banned the cartoons from circulation, and they have not been officially broadcast or released on home video since – even as the rights returned to Warners.

Coal Black and De Sebben Dwarfs has been praised and defended by film scholars and animation historians. Jerry Beck's 1994 book The 50 Greatest Cartoons, placed Coal Black at number 21, based upon votes from over 1,000 members of the American animation industry. Animation historian Michael Barrier published on his website a 2003 defence of the cartoon by Milton Gray, along with further commentary from Barrier and Gray in response to readers' comments on the essay.

The cartoon is often bootlegged for release on home video. It was seen briefly in the 1989 Turner Entertainment VHS release Cartoons For Big Kids, hosted by Leonard Maltin, and in the Behind the Tunes featurette "Once Upon a Looney Tune", which is included in the Looney Tunes Golden Collection: Volume 5 DVD box set.

On April 24, 2010, Coal Black and De Sebben Dwarfs, along with seven other titles from the Censored Eleven, was screened at the first annual Turner Classic Movies (TCM) Film Festival as part of a special presentation hosted by film historian Donald Bogle; the eight shorts shown were restored for that release.

== See also ==
- List of World War II short films
- Stereotypes of African Americans
