= Introducing Dorothy Dandridge =

1999 television film directed by Martha Coolidge

- Promotional poster
- Genre: Biographical drama
- Based on: Dorothy Dandridge by Earl Mills
- Screenplay by: Shonda Rhimes; Scott Abbott
- Directed by: Martha Coolidge
- Starring: Halle Berry; Brent Spiner; Obba Babatundé; Loretta Devine; Cynda Williams; LaTanya Richardson; Tamara Taylor; Alexis Carrington; Klaus Maria Brandauer
- Composer: Elmer Bernstein
- Country of origin: United States
- Original language: English

Production
- Executive producers: Robert Katz; Moctezuma Esparza; Joshua D. Maurer; Vincent Cirrincione; Halle Berry
- Producer: Larry Y. Albucher
- Cinematography: Robbie Greenberg
- Editor: Alan Heim
- Running time: 120 minutes
- Production companies: HBO Pictures; Esparza/Katz Productions; Berry/Cirrincione
- Budget: $9.2 million

Original release
- Network: HBO
- Release: August 21, 1999

Introducing Dorothy Dandridge is a 1999 American biographical drama television film directed by Martha Coolidge and written by Shonda Rhimes and Scott Abbott, based on the 1991 biography Dorothy Dandridge by Earl Mills. Filmed over a span of a few weeks in the autumn of 1998, the film stars Halle Berry as actress and singer Dorothy Dandridge and premiered on HBO on August 21, 1999. The original music score was composed by Elmer Bernstein, who had known Dandridge and Otto Preminger.

== Cast ==
- Halle Berry as Dorothy Dandridge
  - Wendi Williams provides the singing voice for Dorothy Dandridge
- Brent Spiner as Earl Mills
- Klaus Maria Brandauer as Otto Preminger
- Obba Babatundé as Harold Nicholas
- Loretta Devine as Ruby Dandridge
- Cynda Williams as Vivian Dandridge
- LaTanya Richardson as Auntie
- Tamara Taylor as Geri Branton-Nicholas
- William Atherton as Darryl Zanuck
- D. B. Sweeney as Jack Denison
- Don Gettinger as Hotel Clerk
- Nicholas Hormann as Oscar Emcee
- Sharon Brown as Etta Jones
- Darrian C Ford as Fayard Nicholas
- Andre Carthen as Harry Belafonte
- Jon Mack as Ava Gardner
- Kerri Randles as Marilyn Monroe
- Benjamin Brown as Sidney Poitier
- Tyrone Wade as Lex Barker

== Production ==
Filming began on 29 September 1998.

== Soundtrack ==
RCA Victor released a soundtrack album on August 10, 1999.

1. "Your Red Wagon" – Wendi Williams (2:29)
2. "I Got Rhythm" – Wendi Williams (2:44)
3. "Hep Hop" – Bill Elliott (3:17)
4. "Chattanooga Choo Choo" – Wendi Williams (2:27)
5. "Sportsman's Mambo" – Bill Elliott (3:08)
6. "Somebody" – Wendi Williams (2:33)
7. "Twelve Cylinders" – Bill Elliott (3:39)
8. "You Do Something to Me" – Wendi Williams (2:19)
9. "Zoot Suit for My Sunday Gal" – Wendi Williams (3:28)
10. "That's All" – Wendi Williams (2:34)
11. "Streamliner" – Bill Elliott (3:49)
12. "First Telephone" – Elmer Bernstein (2:05)
13. "Try Again" – Elmer Bernstein (1:17)
14. "No Song" – Elmer Bernstein (1:18)
15. "Dorothy" – Elmer Bernstein (2:04)

== Awards and nominations ==
Year	Award	Category	Nominee(s)	Result	Ref.
2000	American Cinema Editors Awards	Best Edited Motion Picture for Non-Commercial Television	Alan Heim	Won	
2000	American Society of Cinematographers Awards	Outstanding Achievement in Cinematography in Movie of the Week, Miniseries or Pilot	Robbie Greenberg	Won	
2000	Art Directors Guild Awards	Excellence in Production Design Award – Television Movie or Miniseries	James H. Spencer, A. Leslie Thomas, and Kristen Pratt	Won	
2000	Artios Awards	Best Casting for TV Movie of the Week	Aleta Chappelle	Nominated	
2000	Black Reel Awards	Best Television Miniseries or Movie	Halle Berry and Joshua D. Maurer	Won	
2000	Black Reel Awards	Best Actress in a TV Movie or Limited Series	Halle Berry	Won	
2000	Black Reel Awards	Best Supporting Actor in a TV Movie or Limited Series	Obba Babatundé	Nominated	
2000	Black Reel Awards	Best Supporting Actor in a TV Movie or Limited Series	Brent Jennings	Nominated	
2000	Columbus International Film & Animation Festival	Bronze Plaque Award (Entertainment)		Won	
2000	Directors Guild of America Awards	Outstanding Directorial Achievement in Movies for Television or Miniseries	Martha Coolidge	Nominated	
2000	Golden Globe Awards	Best Miniseries or Motion Picture Made for Television		Nominated	
2000	Golden Globe Awards	Best Actress in a Miniseries or Motion Picture Made for Television	Halle Berry	Won	
2000	Golden Globe Awards	Best Supporting Actor in a Miniseries or Motion Picture Made for Television	Klaus Maria Brandauer	Nominated	
2000	Golden Reel Awards	Best Sound Editing – Television Movies and Specials – Dialogue & ADR	David Hankins, Doug Kent, David Beadle, Larry Goeb, Helen Luttrell, Erik Aadahl, Patrick Hogan, David MacMillan, Larry Stensvold, and Stacey Michaels	Won	
2000	Golden Reel Awards	Best Sound Editing – Television Movies and Specials – Effects & Foley	David Hankins, Doug Kent, Michael Babcock, Jeff Sawyer, and Bruce Tanis	Nominated	
2000	Golden Reel Awards	Best Sound Editing – Television Movies and Specials (including Mini-Series) – Music	Kathy Durning and Chris McGeary	Nominated	
2000	NAACP Image Awards	Outstanding Television Movie, Mini-Series or Dramatic Special		Won	
2000	NAACP Image Awards	Outstanding Actor in a Television Movie, Mini-Series or Dramatic Special	Obba Babatundé	Nominated	
2000	NAACP Image Awards	Outstanding Actress in a Television Movie, Mini-Series or Dramatic Special	Halle Berry	Won	
2000	NAMIC Vision Awards	Drama		Won	
2000	Online Film & Television Association Awards	Best Motion Picture Made for Television		Nominated	
2000	Online Film & Television Association Awards	Best Actress in a Motion Picture or Miniseries	Halle Berry	Won	
2000	Online Film & Television Association Awards	Best Supporting Actor in a Motion Picture or Miniseries	Klaus Maria Brandauer	Nominated	
2000	Online Film & Television Association Awards	Best Direction of a Motion Picture or Miniseries		Nominated	
2000	Online Film & Television Association Awards	Best Writing of a Motion Picture or Miniseries		Nominated	
2000	Online Film & Television Association Awards	Best Ensemble in a Motion Picture or Miniseries		Nominated	
2000	Online Film & Television Association Awards	Best Costume Design in a Motion Picture or Limited Series		Won	
2000	Online Film & Television Association Awards	Best Editing in a Motion Picture or Limited Series		Nominated	
2000	Online Film & Television Association Awards	Best Lighting in a Motion Picture or Miniseries		Nominated	
2000	Online Film & Television Association Awards	Best Makeup/Hairstyling in a Motion Picture or Miniseries		Won	
2000	Online Film & Television Association Awards	Best Music in a Motion Picture or Miniseries		Won	
2000	Online Film & Television Association Awards	Best New Theme Song in a Motion Picture or Miniseries		Nominated	
2000	Online Film & Television Association Awards	Best New Titles Sequence in a Motion Picture or Miniseries		Nominated	
2000	Primetime Emmy Awards	Outstanding Made for Television Movie	Moctezuma Esparza, Robert Katz, Joshua D. Maurer, Halle Berry, Vincent Cirrincione, and Larry Y. Albucher	Nominated	
2000	Primetime Emmy Awards	Outstanding Lead Actress in a Miniseries or a Movie	Halle Berry	Won	
2000	Primetime Emmy Awards	Outstanding Supporting Actor in a Miniseries or a Movie	Klaus Maria Brandauer	Nominated	
2000	Primetime Emmy Awards	Outstanding Directing for a Miniseries, Movie or a Special	Martha Coolidge	Nominated	
2000	Primetime Emmy Awards	Outstanding Art Direction for a Miniseries, Movie or a Special	James H. Spencer, Robert Greenfield, and A. Leslie Thomas	Won	
2000	Primetime Emmy Awards	Outstanding Choreography	Kim Blank	Nominated	
2000	Primetime Emmy Awards	Outstanding Cinematography for a Miniseries, Movie or a Special	Robbie Greenberg	Won	
2000	Primetime Emmy Awards	Outstanding Costumes for a Miniseries, Movie or a Special	Shelley Komarov and Lucinda Campbell	Won	
2000	Primetime Emmy Awards	Outstanding Hairstyling for a Miniseries, Movie or a Special	Hazel Catmull, Kathrine Gordon, Katherine Rees, Jennifer Bell, and Virginia Kearns	Won	
2000	Primetime Emmy Awards	Outstanding Single-Camera Picture Editing for a Miniseries, Movie or a Special	Alan Heim	Nominated	
2000	Primetime Emmy Awards	Outstanding Sound Editing for a Miniseries, Movie or a Special	David Hankins, Doug Kent, Bruce Tanis, Frank Smathers, Michael Babcock, Jeff Sawyer, David Beadle, Helen Luttrell, Sonya Henry, Larry Goeb, Kathy Durning, Chris McGeary, Dale W. Perry, and Michael Broomberg	Nominated	
2000	Prism Awards	TV Movie, Miniseries or Dramatic Special		Won	
2000	Satellite Awards	Best Motion Picture Made for Television		Nominated	
2000	Satellite Awards	Best Actor in a Miniseries or a Motion Picture Made for Television	Brent Spiner	Nominated	
2000	Satellite Awards	Best Actress in a Miniseries or a Motion Picture Made for Television	Halle Berry	Nominated	
2000	Screen Actors Guild Awards	Outstanding Performance by a Female Actor in a Miniseries or Television Movie	Halle Berry	Won	
