= Hit Parade of 1943 =

1943 American film by Albert S. Rogell

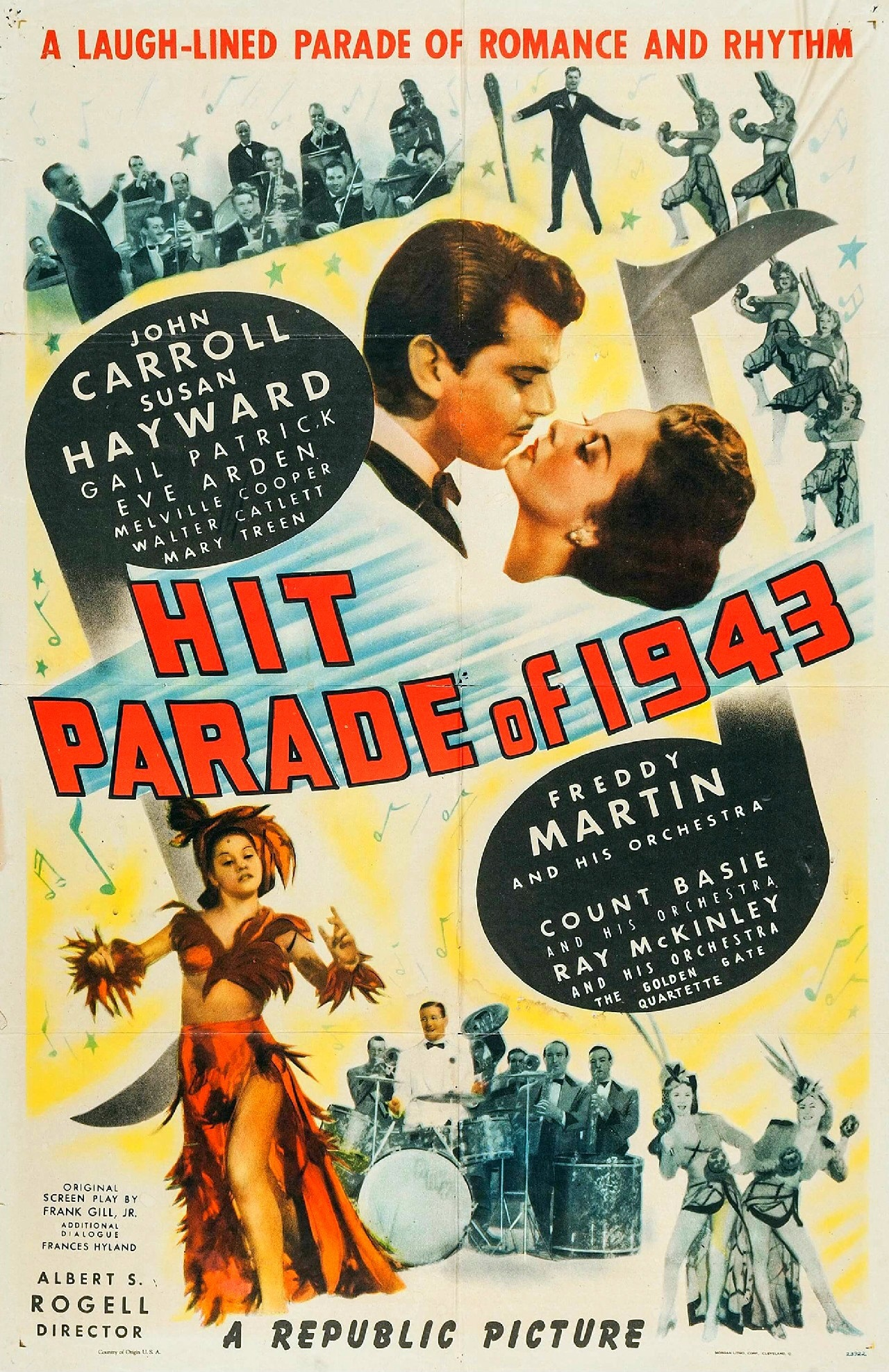
- Original film poster
- Directed by: Albert S. Rogell
- Written by: Frank Gill Jr. Frances Hyland
- Produced by: Albert J. Cohen
- Starring: John Carroll; Susan Hayward; Gail Patrick; Eve Arden; Melville Cooper; Dorothy Dandridge
- Cinematography: Jack A. Marta
- Edited by: Thomas Richards
- Music by: Score: Walter Scharf; Songs: Jule Styne (music); Harold Adamson (lyrics)
- Production company: Republic Pictures
- Distributed by: Republic Pictures
- Release date: March 26, 1943
- Running time: 82 minutes
- Country: United States
- Language: English

Hit Parade of 1943 also known as Change of Heart is a 1943 American musical film made by Republic Pictures. It was directed by Albert S. Rogell and produced by Albert J. Cohen from a screenplay by Frank Gill Jr. and Frances Hyland.

The film stars John Carroll, Susan Hayward (singing dubbed by Jeanne Darrell), Gail Patrick (singing dubbed by Ruth Fox), Eve Arden, Melville Cooper, Walter Catlett, Mary Treen, and Dorothy Dandridge. It also features several orchestras including the Count Basie Orchestra, Freddy Martin and his orchestra, Ray McKinley and his orchestra, and the Golden Gate Quartet.

== Cast ==
- John Carroll as Rick Farrell
- Susan Hayward as Jill Wright
- Gail Patrick as Toni Jarrett
- Eve Arden as Belinda Wright
- Melville Cooper as Bradley Cole
- Walter Catlett as J. MacClellan Davis
- Mary Treen as Janie
- Tom Kennedy as Westinghouse
- Astrid Allwyn as Joyce Germaine
- Tim Ryan as Brownie May
- Dorothy Dandridge as Count Basie Band Singer
- Addison Richards as Mr. Demeling, Producer
- Gino Corrado as Kitchen Chef
- Olaf Hytten as Waiter

== Bibliography ==
- Hurst, Richard Maurice (2007). Republic Studios: Between Poverty Row and the Majors. Scarecrow Press. ISBN 978-0-8108-5886-2.
