= A Hole in the Head =

1959 film by Frank Capra

- Directed by: Frank Capra
- Screenplay by: Arnold Schulman
- Based on: A Hole in the Head; 1957 play by Arnold Schulman
- Produced by: Frank Capra
- Starring: Frank Sinatra; Edward G. Robinson; Eleanor Parker; Keenan Wynn; Carolyn Jones; Thelma Ritter; Dub Taylor; Ruby Dandridge; Joi Lansing; Eddie Hodges
- Cinematography: William H. Daniels
- Edited by: William Hornbeck
- Music by: Nelson Riddle
- Distributed by: United Artists
- Release date: 1959
- Running time: 120 min
- Country: United States
- Language: English
- Budget: $1.89 million
- Box office: $5.2 million (est. US/ Canada rentals)

A Hole in the Head is a 1959 DeLuxe Color CinemaScope American comedy film directed by Frank Capra and starring Frank Sinatra, Edward G. Robinson, Eleanor Parker, Keenan Wynn, Carolyn Jones and Thelma Ritter and released by United Artists. It was based upon the play of the same name by Arnold Schulman.

The film introduced the Academy Award-winning song "High Hopes" by Sammy Cahn and Jimmy Van Heusen, a Sinatra standard used as a campaign song by John F. Kennedy during the presidential election the following year. Sinatra sings "All My Tomorrows," another Cahn/Van Heusen song, under the opening titles.

== Plot ==
Tony Manetta moved from New York to Miami with two friends 20 years ago, searching for wealth and success. One friend, Jerry Marks, became a prosperous promoter while his younger friend drives a taxi. Tony manages a small hotel called the Garden of Eden. He was raised poor but spoiled, spending money on expensive suits and a Cadillac despite always being in debt and refusing to become more responsible. He is also the widowed father of 11-year-old son Ally.

In debt with the rent five months in arrears, Tony is given 48 hours by his landlord to raise $5,300 or else lose the hotel. In desperation, Tony calls his older brother Mario, who owns a clothing store and has loaned Tony money multiple times. Tony lies and says that he needs a loan because Ally is ill. Mario and his wife Sophie fly to Miami and discover the truth.

In Mario's eyes, Tony is a bum who wastes money on fanciful dreams rather than performing honest, hard work. He agrees to stake Tony the funds but only for a sensible small business, not dreams of fancy hotels or casinos. Mario arranges for Tony to meet Eloise Rogers, a widow and an acquaintance of Sophie, who is considered a more appropriate companion for Tony than his current girlfriend Shirl.

Tony is impressed with Eloise and Ally likes her as well. Mario offends her with prying questions about her late husband's will and finances, causing Tony to confess why they were introduced. Eloise reveals to Tony that, having lost both her husband and son, she wants to be with someone who needs her.

Jerry invites Tony to a party. Pretending to be prosperous, Tony explains his scheme to buy land in Florida and open a second Disneyland there. Jerry seems interested in being his partner again. He takes Tony to a greyhound racing track, where Tony uses the $500 that he earned from selling his Cadillac to match Jerry's large bet. His dog wins, but he lets it ride in the next race. The obvious desperation in Tony's voice as he roots for the dog to win indicates to Jerry that Tony is not a man of means. Jerry chastises him and tries to insultingly hand him some cash. When Tony throws the cash handout in Jerry's face, Tony is punched by one of Jerry's bodyguards.

Tony decides that it would be best if Ally lived in New York with Mario and Sophie and tells Ally that he is unwanted. Tony goes to the beach by himself, but Ally finds him, and soon Eloise joins them. Mario and Sophie take a long overdue vacation.

== Cast ==
- Frank Sinatra as Tony Manetta
- Edward G. Robinson as Mario Manetta
- Eleanor Parker as Eloise Rogers
- Carolyn Jones as Shirl
- Thelma Ritter as Sophie Manetta
- Keenan Wynn as Jerry Marks
- Joi Lansing as Dorine
- Eddie Hodges as Alvin "Ally" Manetta
- Joyce Nizzari as Alice
- Dub Taylor as Fred
- Benny Rubin as Abe Diamond
- Ruby Dandridge as Sally
- James Komack as Julius Manetta
- Connie Sawyer as Miss Wexler
- Emory Parnell as Sheriff (uncredited)

== Original play ==
The story originated as a one-act play titled The Dragon's Head, written by Arnold Schulman in 1949. Under the title My Fiddle Has Three Strings it played at Westport under the direction of Lee Strasberg. According to Schulman, "The play was a total disaster because between the lines "Hello?" and "How are you?" each actor did five minutes of "sense memory"... It was a normal-length play that lasted about six hours on opening night."

== Television Play ==
Schulman wrote a new version titled The Hearts of Forgotten Hotel that was staged as a television broadcast as part of the Playwrights '56 anthology series in 1955. Arthur Penn directed. Schulman said "It was a beautiful production, the best it ever was... it was very, very simple, not a comedy at all. It ended very unhappily. It was a tiny slice of life, done brilliantly."

The show drew the attention of Garson Kanin, who asked Schulman to convert it for Broadway. The Tony Award-winning Broadway play debuted in 1957. It was renamed A Hole in the Head. Schulman said "I had no idea how it applied to the play and still don't."

Schulman said that when the play was on the road, "The audiences went into hysterics at the funny stuff and hated the serious stuff... I knew easily how to fix it and make it into a hit. Just take out the serious stuff, put in more jokes, and give it a happy ending. And that is what I did. Since then, I've felt that is the moment when I sold out."

The play was a big success.

== Production ==
Frank Sinatra's agent Bert Allenberg bought the film rights for $200,000 plus 5% of the profits.

The hotel used for the exterior shots was the Cardozo Hotel, located on Miami Beach's Ocean Drive. Shot over 40 days from November 10, 1958 to January 9, 1959, the film did not enjoy a smooth production, particularly during the location filming at Miami Beach. Sinatra's relations with the press were problematic, as he believed that the media perpetuated rumors involving him.

Aided by cinematographer William Daniels, Capra completed the film 80 days ahead of schedule, partly because he shot very long takes, knowing Sinatra's famed antipathy for performing scenes more than once. The film's final production cost of $1.89 million was under its allotted budget.

Schulman wrote a novel based on the film containing additional material. The story was adapted again in 1968 as the Broadway musical Golden Rainbow.

== Release ==
The film opened on June 17, 1959. It was a modest box-office success, earning theatrical rentals of $5.2 million in the United States and Canada.

== Reception ==
In a contemporary review for The New York Times, critic Bosley Crowther called A Hole in the Head "a perfect entertainment on the screen" and wrote:

[T]he fact that Mr. Capra, is back with us, by virtue of his own benevolent choice, and is back with such command of his old gusto, should be a thrill for those who have respect for him. Anyone who remembers his great pictures ... will find a most gratifying kinship in this sparkling ''A Hole in the Head" ... For this is another of those wonderfully colloquial American comedies that has the recklessness, the sentiment, the flavor and the stabbing pathos of what we like to reckon as average American life. ... [T]he prize goes to Mr. Sinatra, who makes the hero of this vibrant color film a soft-hearted, hardboiled, white-souled black sheep whom we will cherish, along with Mr. Deeds and Mr. Smith, as one of the great guys that Mr. Capra has escorted to the American screen.

Critic Philip K. Scheuer of the Los Angeles Times wrote: "For eight years Hollywood has been unaccountably and, I am sure, needlessly deprived of this director ... While he has not performed any major miracle with 'A Hole in the Head,' he has at least dressed up a so-so stage comedy with laughs, human interest, a shot of sex and even a suspicion of a tear toward the close."

Schulman, who had been integrally involved in the film throughout production, said, "The first time I saw the film put together I was mortified. It was so goddamn sentimental that it was nauseating to me. I was embarrassed. I'm still embarrassed. What a metamorphosis! It had started as the Lee Strasberg version—all art—suffering and pain and heat. It turned out to be Frank Capra's A Hole in the Head. Joke, joke, joke, yuk, yuk, yuk. A hell of a metamorphosis."

== Awards ==
The film's song "High Hopes" was nominated by the American Film Institute for inclusion in its 2004 AFI's 100 Years...100 Songs list.

== See also ==
- List of American films of 1959

== Notes ==
- McGilligan, Patrick (1997). "Arnold Schulman: Nothing but Regrets". Backstory 3 : interviews with screenwriters of the 1960s. Berkeley: University of California Press. pp. 298–327.
