= Pillow to Post =

1945 film by Vincent Sherman

- Directed by: Vincent Sherman
- Screenplay by: Charles Hoffman
- Based on: Pillar to Post; 1943 play by Rose Simon Kohn
- Produced by: Alex Gottlieb
- Starring: Ida Lupino; Sydney Greenstreet; William Prince
- Cinematography: Wesley Anderson
- Edited by: Alan Crosland Jr.
- Music by: Score: Friedrich Hollaender; Songs: Burton Lane (music); Ted Koehler (lyrics)
- Production company: Warner Bros. Pictures
- Distributed by: Warner Bros. Pictures
- Release date: May 17, 1945
- Running time: 92 minutes
- Country: United States
- Language: English

Pillow to Post is a 1945 American romantic comedy film directed by Vincent Sherman and starring Ida Lupino, Sydney Greenstreet and William Prince. Based on the play Pillar to Post by Rose Simon Kohn, it is about a tired traveling saleswoman who goes to great lengths to find a place to sleep during the World War II housing shortage.

== Plot ==
Socialite Jean Howard is stirred to patriotism and eager to help the war effort. When she overhears her father, J. R. Howard (an uncredited Paul Harvey), complain that the military has taken all of the salesmen of his oil rig supply company, she volunteers to take their place. J. R. gives in, though he reminds her that she has never worked a day in her life.

On one business trip, Howard arrives at a town where the only available place to sleep is a bungalow reserved for married couples. When she is mistaken for the war bride of a lieutenant, she goes along. To register at the Colonial Auto Court, however, she has to produce her "husband". She persuades a very reluctant Lieutenant Don Mallory to help her out, promising it will only take a few minutes of his day off. The couple become trapped in their masquerade as newlyweds when they run into Don's commanding officer, Colonel Michael Otley, who lives just a few doors down with his wife.

When Howard goes out to see prospective customer Earl "Slim" Clark, he insists on taking her out to dinner to discuss the deal. To maintain appearances, Don goes along. The dinner does not go well. While trying to restrain a drunk acquaintance, Slim accidentally knocks Don out and is himself rendered unconscious by the drunk man.

When they return to the auto court, Don and Jean have to sleep under the same roof on their "wedding night". He gives her the bed and sleeps first in the kitchen, which proves too uncomfortable, so he goes outdoors.

Complications ensue when Otley takes an interest in the couple and insists that Don make Jean the beneficiary of his insurance policy and allot her part of his pay. Don's mother also arrives for an early unexpected visit.

During a dinner party given by the Otleys for the couple, the colonel mentions to Jean the impending court-martial of another lieutenant who lied about being married. Alarmed, she drinks too much sherry to steady her nerves. While drunk, she privately reveals to Don that she has fallen in love with him.

The charade is finally revealed when the colonel and Don's mother meet. Jean's father also joins the festivities. Fortunately, Lucille, a male auto court employee, tells Otley that he did see Don sleep outside, so the colonel does not press charges. Don decides the thing to do is to get married for real, much to Jean's delight.

== Cast ==
- Ida Lupino as Jean Howard
- Sydney Greenstreet as Colonel Michael Otley
- William Prince as Lieutenant Don Mallory
- Stuart Erwin as Captain Jack Ross
- Johnny Mitchell as Earl "Slim" Clark
- Ruth Donnelly as Mrs. Grace Wingate, manager of the auto court
- Barbara Brown as Mrs. Kate Otley, the colonel's wife
- Frank Orth as Taxi Driver
- Regina Wallace as Mrs. Mallory, Don's mother
- Willie Best as Lucille
- Louis Armstrong and His Orchestra as Themselves at the Tavern
  - Dorothy Dandridge appeared as the featured performer

Robert Blake has an uncredited role as a brat at the auto court who likes to drop water bombs on unsuspecting passersby.
