= Dorothy Dandridge =

American actress and singer (1922–1965)

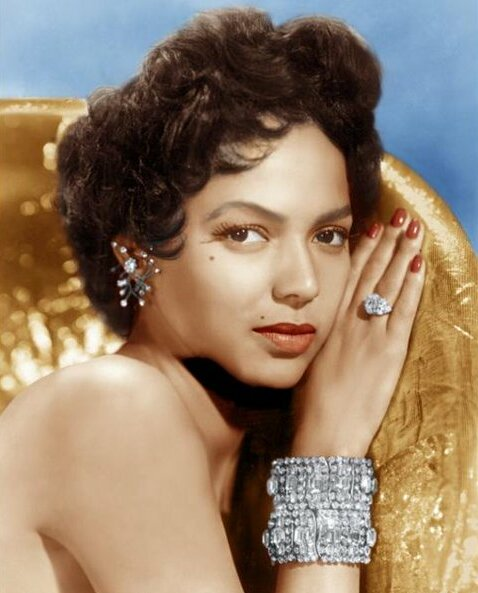
- Dandridge in 1954
- Born: Dorothy Jean Dandridge; November 9, 1922; Cleveland, Ohio, U.S.
- Died: September 8, 1965 (aged 42); West Hollywood, California, U.S.
- Resting place: Forest Lawn Memorial Park
- Occupations: Actress; singer; dancer
- Years active: 1933–1965
- Spouses: Harold Nicholas (m. 1942; div. 1951); Jack Denison (m. 1959; div. 1962)
- Children: 1
- Mother: Ruby Dandridge
- Relatives: Vivian Dandridge (sister); Nayo Wallace (great-niece)

Dorothy Jean Dandridge (November 9, 1922 – September 8, 1965) was an American actress and singer. She was the first African American to be nominated for the Academy Award for Best Actress for Carmen Jones (1954), a performance which also earned her a nomination for a BAFTA Award for Best Foreign Actress. Dandridge had also performed as a vocalist in venues such as the Cotton Club and the Apollo Theater. During her early career, she performed as a part of the Wonder Children, later the Dandridge Sisters, and appeared in a succession of films, usually in uncredited roles.

In 1959, Dandridge was nominated for both a Golden Globe Award and a Laurel Award for Porgy and Bess. She was the subject of the 1999 biographical film Introducing Dorothy Dandridge, with Halle Berry portraying her. In 1983, she was recognized, posthumously, with a star on the Hollywood Walk of Fame.

Dandridge was married and divorced twice, first to dancer Harold Nicholas (the father of her daughter, Harolyn Suzanne) and then to hotel owner Jack Denison. Dandridge died in 1965 at the age of 42.

== Early life ==
Dorothy Jean Dandridge was born in 1922 in Cleveland, Ohio to entertainer Ruby (née Butler) and Cyril Dandridge. Her father was a cabinetmaker and Baptist minister. Her parents separated before her birth.

Ruby created a song-and-dance act for her two young daughters, Vivian and Dorothy, under the name The Wonder Children. The act was managed by her lover, Geneva Williams. Williams was said to have had a bad temper and to have cruelly disciplined the children. The sisters toured the Southern United States almost nonstop for five years (rarely attending school), while Ruby worked and performed in Cleveland.

During the Great Depression, work virtually dried up for the Dandridges, as it did for many Chitlin' Circuit performers. Ruby moved her family to Hollywood, California, where she found steady work on radio and film in small domestic-servant parts. After that relocation, in 1930, Dorothy attended McKinley Junior High School in Pasadena.

The Wonder Children were renamed The Dandridge Sisters in 1934. Dandridge and her sister were teamed with dance schoolmate Etta Jones.

== Career ==
=== Beginnings ===
The popularity of the Dandridge Sisters remained strong for several years. They were booked in several high-profile New York nightclubs, including the Cotton Club and the Apollo Theater.

Dorothy Dandridge first appeared on-screen at the age of 12, doubling for one of The Cabin Kids in the Bing Crosby-W. C. Fields musical comedy Mississippi (1935). That same year, when The Cabin Kids made a guest appearance in the Our Gang comedy short Teacher's Beau, Dandridge also appeared in a small role. As part of The Dandridge Sisters, she also appeared in The Big Broadcast of 1936 (1936) with Bill "Bojangles" Robinson, A Day at the Races with the Marx Brothers, and It Can't Last Forever (both 1937) with the Jackson Brothers. Although these appearances were relatively minor, Dandridge continued to earn recognition through her nightclub performances nationwide.

Dandridge's first credited film role was in Four Shall Die (1940). The race film cast her as a murderer and did little for her film career. Because of her rejection of stereotypical black roles, she had limited options for film roles. She had small roles in Lady from Louisiana with John Wayne and Sundown with Gene Tierney, both in 1941.

=== Success as a specialty performer ===
Dandridge appeared as part of the specialty number "Chattanooga Choo Choo" in the hit 1941 musical Sun Valley Serenade for 20th Century Fox. The film marked the first time she performed with the Nicholas Brothers.

In addition to her screen appearances, Dandridge appeared in 10 Soundies – three-minute movie musicals that were displayed on coin-operated-projector jukeboxes -- during 1941 and 1942. She appeared as a dancer in the Mills Brothers' "Paper Doll" but usually appeared as a singer in such mini-musicals as "Swing for Your Supper", "A Zoot Suit (With a Reet Pleat)", "Cow-Cow Boogie", and "Yes, Indeed!" These films showcased her musical and acting talents, as well as her attractive face and figure. Dorothy Dandridge and another movie newcomer, Gale Storm, became Soundies' first stars.

In 1941 Dandridge was a featured performer in Duke Ellington’s musical review “Jump for Joy.” She appeared occasionally in films and on the stage throughout the rest of the 1940s and performed as a band singer in films with Count Basie in Hit Parade of 1943 and with Louis Armstrong in Atlantic City (1944) and Pillow to Post (1945). In 1944, Dandridge starred on stage in "Sweet 'N Hot", a musical held at the Mayan theatre in Los Angeles and produced by Leon Hefflin Sr., which played nightly for 11 weeks. In 1951, Dandridge appeared as Melmendi, Queen of the Ashuba in Tarzan's Peril, starring Lex Barker and Virginia Huston. When the Motion Picture Production Code objected to the film's "blunt sexuality", Dandridge received considerable attention for wearing what was considered "provocatively revealing" clothing. The continuing publicity buzz surrounding Dandridge's wardrobe got her featured on the April 1951 cover of Ebony. The same year, she had an ingenue role in Columbia Pictures' dramatization of the exhibition basketball team, The Harlem Globetrotters.

In May 1951, Dandridge had a spectacular opening at the Mocambo nightclub in West Hollywood, the biggest in its history, after assiduous coaching and decisions on style with pianist Phil Moore. This success seemed a new turn to her career, and she appeared in New York and at Café de Paris in London with equal success. In a return engagement at the Mocambo in December 1952, a Metro-Goldwyn-Mayer studio agent saw Dandridge and recommended to production chief Dore Schary that she might make an appearance as a club singer, in her own name, in Remains to Be Seen, a film already in production. Her acquaintance with Dore Schary resulted in his casting Dandridge as Jane Richards in Bright Road—her first starring role, in which she expressed herself as a "wonderful, emotional actress"—which the trailer promoted. The film, which centered on a teacher's struggles to reach a troubled student, marked the first time Dandridge appeared in a film opposite Harry Belafonte. She continued her performances in nightclubs and appeared on multiple early television variety shows, including Ed Sullivan's Toast of the Town.

=== Carmen Jones and 20th Century Fox ===
In 1953, a talent search was conducted as 20th Century Fox began the process of casting an all-black musical film adaptation of Oscar Hammerstein II's 1943 Broadway musical Carmen Jones. This production had updated Georges Bizet's opera Carmen to a World War II-era, African-American setting. Dandridge had most recently played a lead as a school teacher in Bright Road, and director and writer Otto Preminger couldn't visualize Dandridge as the classic femme fatale in Carmen Jones (1954). He thought that she would be suited for the smaller role, Cindy Lou. Dandridge, who had dressed appropriately for the screen test of Bright Road to suit the demure teacher she had portrayed in that movie, worked with Max Factor makeup artists to convey the look and character of the earthy Carmen for a meeting with Preminger in his office. The effect -- combined with a viewing of her freer, looser performance in the 1941 Soundie "Easy Street" -- convinced Preminger that Dandridge was right for the title role.

The remainder of the cast was completed with Harry Belafonte, Pearl Bailey, Brock Peters, Diahann Carroll, Madame Sul-Te-Wan (uncredited), Olga James, and Joe Adams.

Despite Dandridge's recognition as a singer, the studio wanted an operatic voice, so Dandridge's voice was dubbed by white mezzo-soprano Marilyn Horne. Carmen Jones opened to favorable reviews and strong box-office returns on October 28, 1954, earning $70,000 during its first week and $50,000 during its second. Dandridge's performance as the seductive Carmen made her one of Hollywood's first African-American sex symbols and earned her positive reviews. On November 1, 1954, Dorothy Dandridge became the first black woman featured on the cover of Life. Walter Winchell described her performance as "bewitching", and Variety wrote that it "maintains the right hedonistic note throughout".

Carmen Jones became a worldwide success, eventually earning over $10 million at the box office and becoming one of the year's highest-earning films. Dandridge was nominated for an Academy Award for Best Actress, becoming the first African American nominated for a leading role. At the 27th Academy Awards held on March 30, 1955, Dandridge was a nominee along with Grace Kelly, Audrey Hepburn, Judy Garland, and Jane Wyman. Although Kelly won the award for her performance in The Country Girl, Dandridge became an overnight sensation. At the 1955 Oscar ceremony, Dandridge presented the Academy Award for Film Editing to On the Waterfront editor Gene Milford.

On February 15, 1955, Dandridge signed a three-movie deal with 20th Century-Fox starting at $75,000 a film. Darryl F. Zanuck, the studio head, had suggested the studio sign Dandridge to a contract. Zanuck had big aspirations for her, and made plans to give Dandridge the star treatment in remakes of The Blue Angel, where she would take on Marlene Dietrich's old role, and Under Two Flags. These films never materialized. In the meantime, Dandridge was offered secondary roles in The Lieutenant Wore Skirts and The King and I, but at the urging of her director-turned-lover Otto Preminger, she declined both offers. Fox reassigned both roles to Rita Moreno.

On April 11, 1955, Dandridge became the first black performer to open at the Empire Room at New York's Waldorf-Astoria hotel. Her success as a headliner led to the hotel booking other black performers, such as the Count Basie Orchestra with vocalist Joe Williams, Pearl Bailey, and Lena Horne.

=== Hollywood Research, Inc., trial ===
In 1957, Dandridge sued Confidential for libel over its article that described a scandalous incident that it claimed occurred in 1950. In May 1957, she accepted an out-of-court settlement of $10,000.

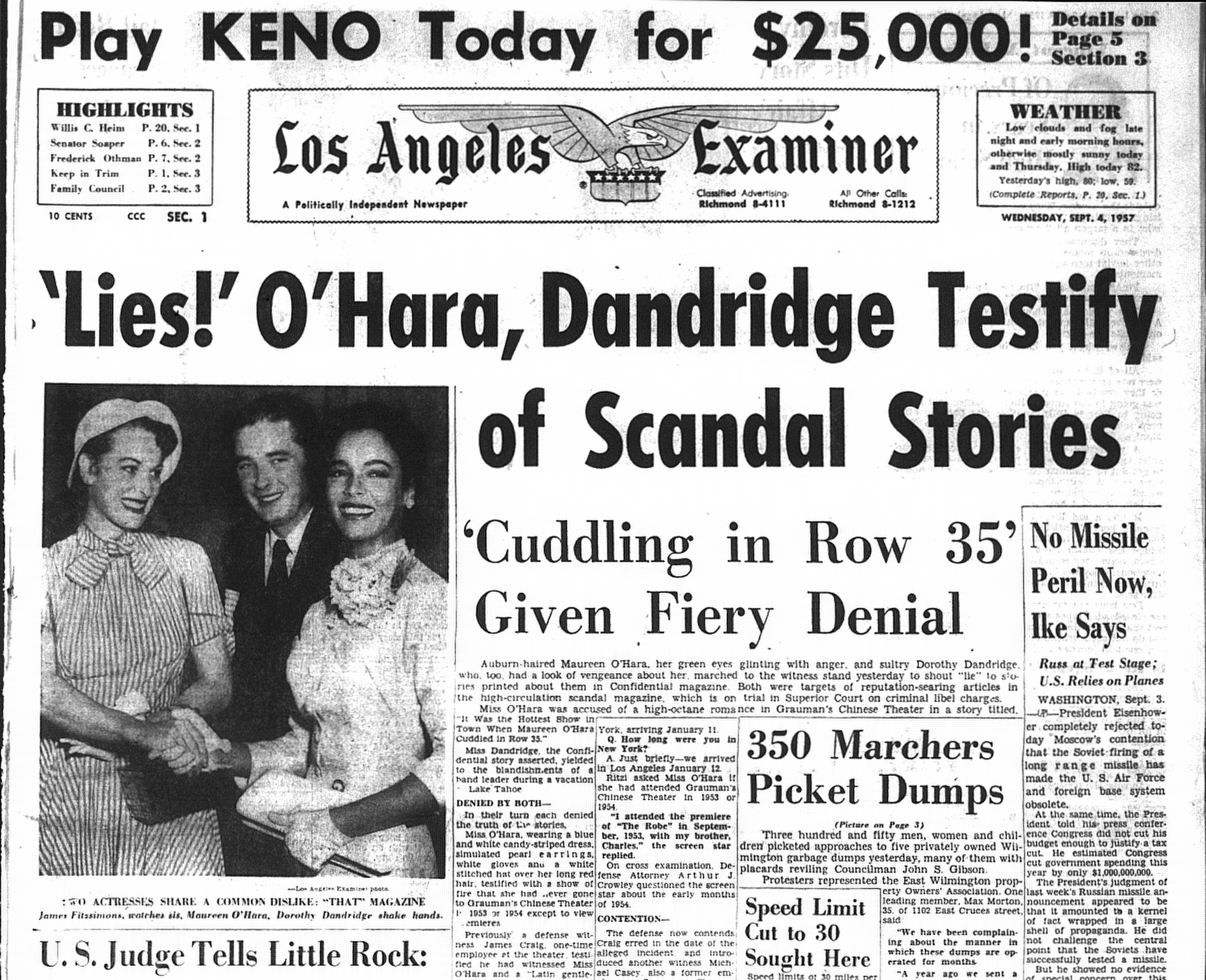
Los Angeles Examiner front page that highlights Dorothy Dandridge and others

Dandridge was one of two Hollywood stars who testified at the 1957 criminal libel trial of Hollywood Research, Inc., the company that published Confidential and other tabloid magazines from that era. Four months after her out-of-court settlement for $10,000, she and actress Maureen O'Hara, the only other star who testified at the criminal trial, were photographed shaking hands outside the downtown-Los Angeles courtroom where the highly publicized trial was held.

Testimony from O'Hara, as well as from a disgruntled former magazine editor named Howard Rushmore, revealed that the magazines published false information provided by hotel maids, clerks, and movie-theater ushers who were paid for their tips. The stories with questionable veracity most often centered around alleged incidents of casual sex. When the jury and press visited Grauman's Chinese Theatre to determine whether O'Hara could have performed various sexual acts while seated in the balcony, as reported by a magazine published by Hollywood Research, Inc., this was discovered to have been impossible.

Dandridge had not testified during her civil lawsuit earlier in 1957, but in September she gave testimony in the criminal trial that further strengthened the prosecution's case. Alleged by Confidential to have fornicated with a white bandleader in the woods of Lake Tahoe, Nevada, in 1950, she testified that racial segregation had confined her to her hotel during her nightclub engagement in Lake Tahoe. When she was not in the hotel lounge rehearsing or performing her singing, according to her testimony, she was required to stay inside her room where she slept alone.

The trial ended in a mistrial. The judge ordered Hollywood Research to stop publishing questionable stories based on paid tips. This curtailed invasive tabloid journalism until 1971, when Generoso Pope, Jr. moved the National Enquirer, which he owned, from New York to Lantana, Florida, where there were fewer restrictions.

== Later career ==
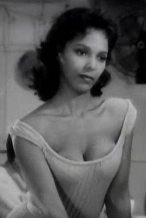
Dandridge in the baiting trailer for The Decks Ran Red (1958)

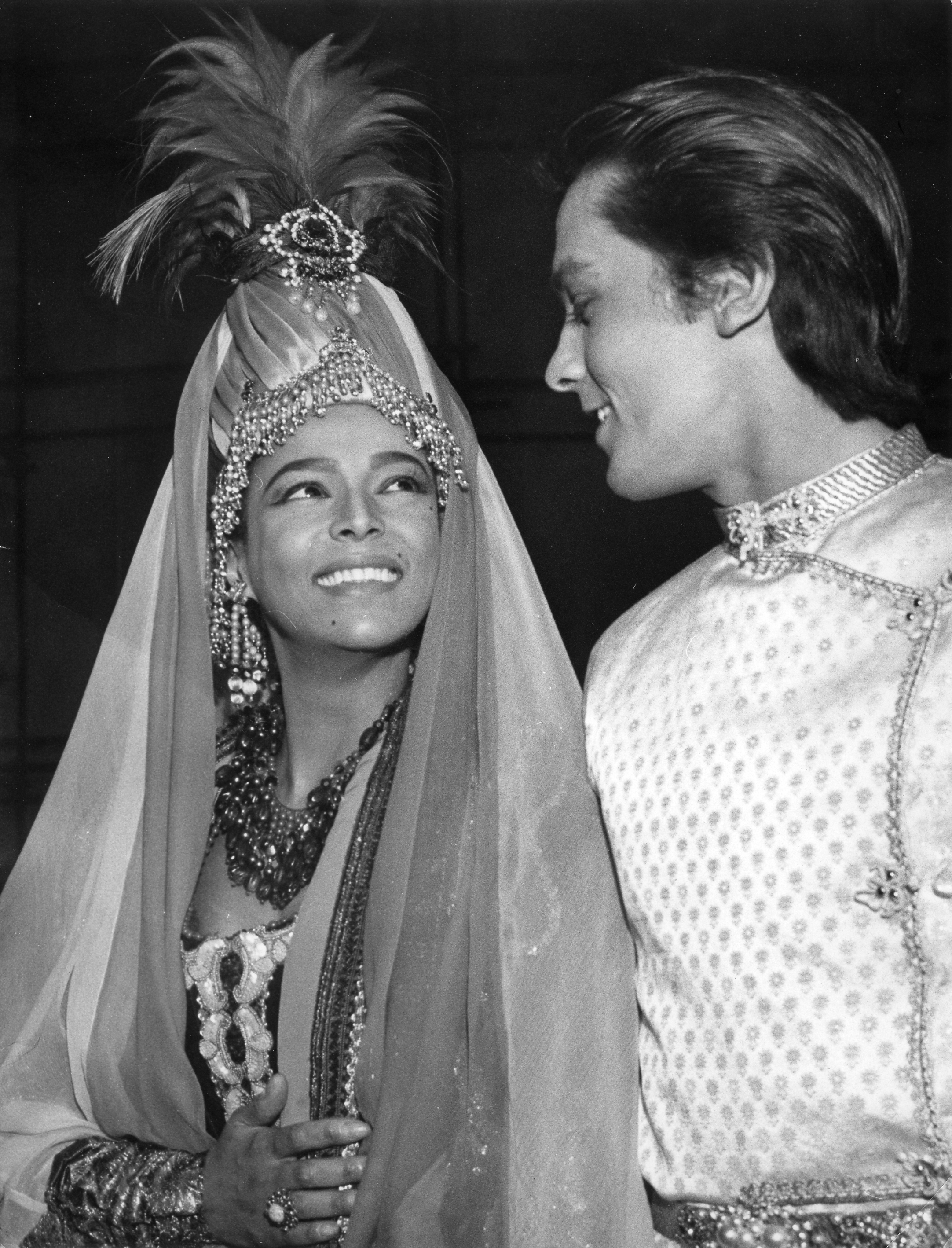
Dandridge with Alain Delon on the set La Fabuleuse Aventure de Marco Polo, filmed in 1962 but only released years later with both edited out.

In 1957, after a three-year absence from film acting, Dandridge agreed to appear in the film Island in the Sun as part of an ensemble cast, including James Mason, Harry Belafonte, Joan Fontaine, Joan Collins, and Stephen Boyd. Dandridge portrayed a local West Indian shop clerk who has an interracial love affair with a white man, played by John Justin. The film was controversial for its time period, and the script was revised numerous times to accommodate the Motion Picture Production Code requirements about interracial relationships. Dandridge and Justin did have an extremely intimate, loving embrace that succeeded in not breaching the code. Despite the behind-the-scenes controversy, the film received favorable reviews and was one of the year's biggest successes.

Dandridge next agreed to star opposite German actor Curd Jürgens in the French/Italian production of Tamango (1958). A reluctant Dandridge had agreed to appear in the film only after learning that it focused on a 19th-century slave revolt on a cargo ship traveling from Africa to Cuba. However, she nearly withdrew when the initial script called for her to swim in the nude and spend the majority of the film in a two-piece bathing suit made of rags. When Dandridge threatened to leave the film, the script and her wardrobe were retooled to her liking. As United States Production code requirements did not apply to the Italian film production, a passionate kiss between Jürgens and Dandridge's characters was permitted in the shooting of Tamango. This was Dandridge's first on-screen kiss with a white actor. Tamango was withheld from American release until late 1959. It received mixed reviews from critics and achieved only minor success.

In MGM's The Decks Ran Red (1958), Dandridge co-starred with James Mason, Broderick Crawford, and Stuart Whitman as Mahia, a cook's wife aboard a tired World War II surplus freighter enduring a mutiny. Despite being universally panned, the film generated a respectable audience. During production, fellow actor Stuart Whitman said that he noted her strength as she was going through personal turmoil.

In late 1958, Dandridge accepted producer Samuel Goldwyn's offer to star alongside Sidney Poitier in Goldwyn's forthcoming production of Porgy and Bess. This was her first major Hollywood film in five years. Her acceptance angered the black community, who felt the story's negative stereotyping of blacks was degrading. When the initial director, Rouben Mamoulian, was replaced with Otto Preminger, he informed Dandridge that her performance was not credible and that she needed intensive coaching to handle such a role. Porgy and Bess had a long and costly production. All the sets and costumes were destroyed in a fire and had to be replaced, which amounted to a loss of almost $2 million. Continuous script rewrites and other problems prolonged the production and ultimately pushed the film over its original budget. When it was released in June 1959, it drew mixed reviews and failed financially.

In 1959, Dandridge starred in the low-budget British thriller Malaga, in which she played a European woman with an Italian name. The film, co-starring Trevor Howard and Edmund Purdom, plotted a jewel robbery and its aftermath. Some pre-release publicity stated that Dandridge received her first on-screen kiss with a white actor (Howard) in this film. She had kissed her white costar in Tamango, but Dandridge and Howard, under László Benedek's direction, created some strongly understated sexual tension. The film was withheld from a theatrical release abroad until 1960, and was not released until 1962 in the United States. Malaga was her final completed film appearance.

In 1962, Dandridge was filmed with Alain Delon on the set of La Fabuleuse Aventure de Marco Polo, a Raoul Lévy-produced French-Italian film that was abandoned due to financial issues. Years later it was released as Marco the Magnificent without either Dandridge or Delon.. She also appeared as Anita in a Highland Park Music Theater production of West Side Story, but she lasted only two performances due to illness. On 31 March 1962, Dandridge sang in the Le Paon Rouge nightclub of the Phoenicia Intercontinental in Lebanon as the guest of honor.

By 1963, Dandridge's popularity had dwindled, and she was performing in nightclubs to pay off debts from numerous lawsuits. She filed for bankruptcy and went into seclusion before appearing as a lounge act in Las Vegas in 1964. In 1965, she attempted to revive her acting career. Dandridge signed a new contract in Mexico and was scheduled to appear as the female lead in a film about outlaw Johnny Ringo.

== Personal life ==
Having developed an interest in activism because of the racism she encountered in the industry, Dandridge became involved with the National Urban League and the National Association for the Advancement of Colored People.

=== Marriages and relationships ===
During an engagement at the Cotton Club, Dandridge met Harold Nicholas, a dancer and entertainer. They married at a Hollywood ceremony on September 6, 1942. Guests at their wedding included Oscar-winner Hattie McDaniel and choreographer Nick Castle. They had an unhappy marriage, which deteriorated because of Nicholas' womanizing and inattentiveness. By 1948, Nicholas had abandoned his family. Dandridge filed for divorce in September 1950, and it was finalized in October 1951.

Dandridge gave birth to her only child, Harolyn Suzanne Nicholas, on September 2, 1943. While she was in labor, Nicholas left her stranded at her sister-in-law's home without the car when he went to play golf. At first, Dandridge refused to go to the hospital without him. Harolyn's delayed birth required the use of forceps. This may have resulted in the brain damage that left her requiring lifelong constant care. Dandridge blamed herself for her daughter's condition, and for not getting to the hospital sooner. Harolyn was unable to speak and never recognized Dandridge as her mother. Dandridge was private about her daughter's condition; she didn't publicly speak about it until a 1963 appearance on The Mike Douglas Show.

While filming Carmen Jones (1954), she began an affair with director Otto Preminger that lasted four years, during which Preminger advised her on career matters. He demanded that she accept only starring roles after her success in his film. Dandridge later regretted following his advice. She became pregnant by him in 1955, but was forced to have an abortion by the studio. She ended the affair when she realized that Preminger had no plans to leave his wife to marry her. Their affair was depicted in the biopic Introducing Dorothy Dandridge, in which Preminger was portrayed by actor Klaus Maria Brandauer.

Dandridge married Jack Denison on June 22, 1959. They divorced in 1962, amid financial setbacks and allegations of domestic violence. Dandridge discovered that the people who were handling her finances had swindled her out of $150,000, and she owed $139,000 in back taxes. She was forced to sell her Hollywood home and place her daughter in a California state mental institution, Camarillo State Hospital. Dandridge moved into a small apartment on Fountain Avenue in West Hollywood, California.

== Final days and death ==
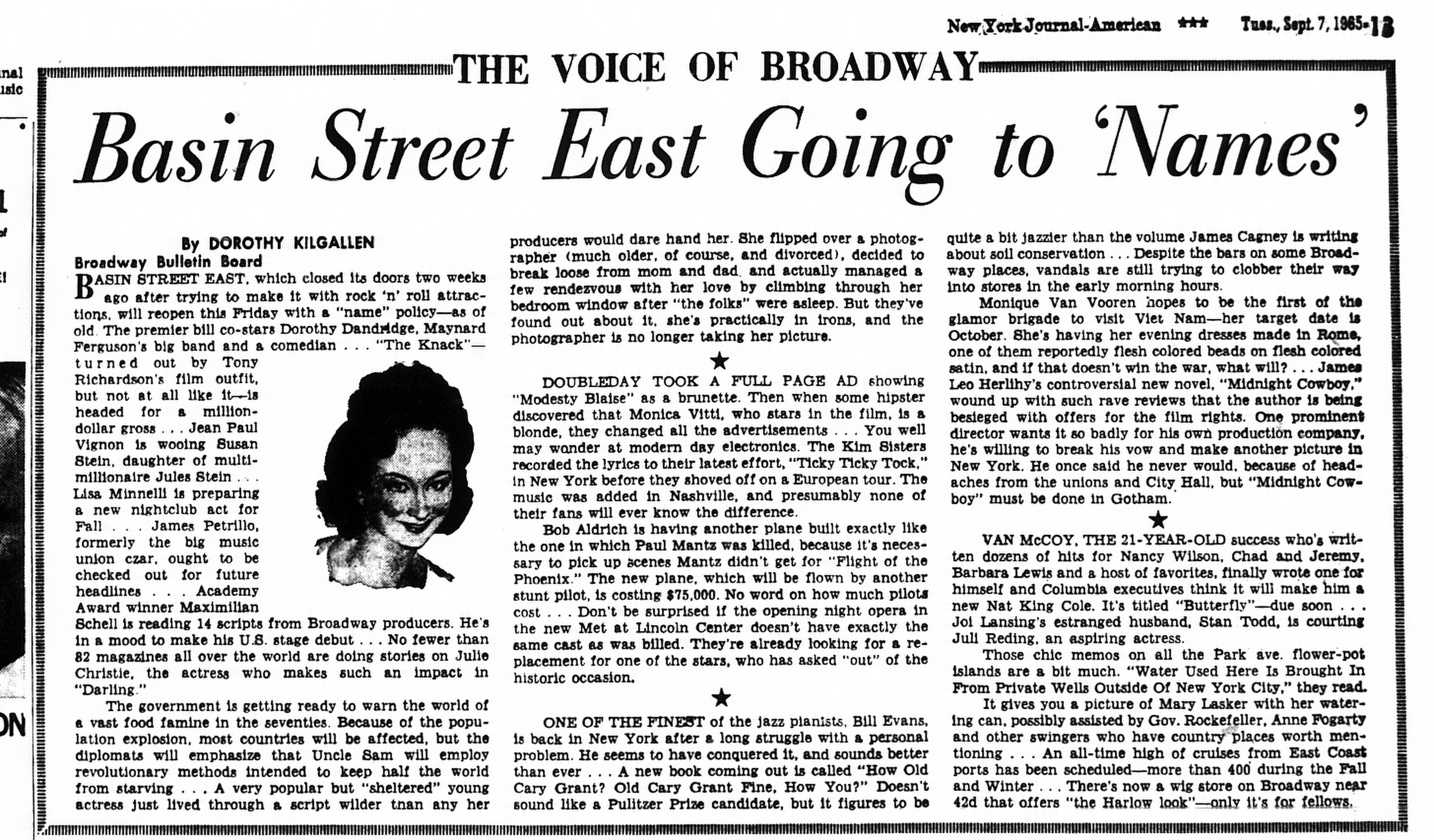
Tuesday, September 7, 1965; Dorothy Kilgallen's show business column states that nightclub Basin Street East would be opening "this Friday" with a Dorothy Dandridge premier engagement.

On the evening of September 7, 1965, Dandridge spoke by telephone from Los Angeles with her friend and former sister-in-law Geraldine "Geri" Branton. Dandridge was scheduled to fly to New York City the next day to prepare for her nightclub engagement at Basin Street East. Branton told biographers that during the long conversation, Dandridge veered from expressing hope for the future, to singing Barbra Streisand's "People" in its entirety, to making a cryptic remark moments before hanging up on her: "Whatever happens, I know you will understand."

On the morning of September 8 around 7:15 am, Dandridge telephoned her manager, Earl Mills, asking him to reschedule a hospital appointment she had that morning where a cast would be applied to her foot where a tiny bone fracture had occurred in a fall five days earlier. A few minutes later, she called again and requested a further delay and a 10:00 am appointment was scheduled. Mills received no response when he arrived at her door at the appointed time.

Several hours later, Dandridge was found unresponsive in her apartment by Mills after he had finally broken in the apartment door using the tire iron from his car. A Los Angeles pathology institute determined that the cause of death was an accidental overdose of the antidepressant imipramine. The Los Angeles County Coroner's Office concluded that she died of a fat embolism resulting from a recently sustained right foot fracture.

On September 12, 1965, a private funeral service was held at the Little Chapel of the Flowers; Dandridge was cremated and her ashes interred in the Freedom Mausoleum at Forest Lawn Memorial Park.

== Legacy ==
In 1997 a tribute to Dandridge was aired on the talk show Charlie Rose, featuring biographer Donald Bogle and actors Ruby Dee and Cicely Tyson, who acknowledge Dandridge's contribution to the image of African Americans in American motion pictures.

In the movie To Wong Foo, Thanks for Everything! Julie Newmar (1995), Wesley Snipes played Noxeema Jackson, a drag queen whose dream is to play Dorothy Dandridge in a movie about her life and work.

In 1999, Halle Berry produced and starred in the movie Introducing Dorothy Dandridge, for which she won the Primetime Emmy Award, Golden Globe Award, and Screen Actors Guild Award. When Berry won the Academy Award for Best Actress for her role in Monster's Ball, she dedicated the "moment [to] Dorothy Dandridge, Lena Horne, Diahann Carroll." Both Dandridge and Berry were from Cleveland, Ohio, and they were born in the same hospital.

Dandridge was posthumously awarded a star on the Hollywood Walk of Fame in January 1984. She is featured as the most prominent figure in a mural on an exterior wall of Hollywood High School. A statue of Dandridge, designed by Catherine Hardwicke, honors multi-ethnic leading ladies of the cinema, including Mae West, Dolores del Río, and Anna May Wong.

Recording artist Janelle Monáe performs a song titled "Dorothy Dandridge Eyes" on her 2013 album The Electric Lady, with Esperanza Spalding. In the 1969 movie The Lost Man, Dorothy Starr (played by Beverly Todd) says that she named herself after Dandridge.

In a February 2016 episode of Black-ish, "Sink or Swim," Beyoncé is referred to as the Dorothy Dandridge of her time, citing the star power that Dandridge wielded in her day.

In 2020, Laura Harrier portrayed Camille Washington in the miniseries Hollywood. She is an up-and-coming actress during the Hollywood Golden Age in the post-World War II era, a character largely inspired by and based on Dandridge.

== Discography ==
Dandridge first gained fame as a solo artist from her performances in nightclubs, usually accompanied by Phil Moore on piano. Although she was known for her renditions of songs such as "Blow Out the Candle", "You Do Something to Me", and "Talk Sweet Talk to Me", she recorded very little on vinyl. It is unknown whether her lack of recording was due to personal choice or lack of opportunity.

=== As part of the Dandridge Sisters singing group ===
Recorded	Song title	Label	Release	Catalogue No.	Issued	Band
1939	"F.D.R. Jones" / "The Lady's in Love with You"	Parlophone	78 rpm	#F1518	1939	
1939	"Undecided" / "If I Were Sure of You"	Parlophone	78 rpm	#F1541	1939	
1940	"That's Your Red Wagon" / "You Ain't Nowhere:	Columbia	78 rpm	#28006/#28007	1940	Jimmie Lunceford
1940	"Minnie the Moocher Is Dead" / "Ain't Going to Go to Study War No More"	Columbia	78 rpm	#26937A/#26938	1940	Jimmie Lunceford

=== As a solo artist ===
Recorded	Song title	Label	Release	Catalogue No.	Issued
1944	Watch'a Say (duet with Louis Armstrong from the film Pillow to Post)	Decca	78 rpm	#L-3502	1944
1951	"Blow Out the Candle" / "I Can't See It Your Way"	Columbia	78 rpm	DB 2923	1951
1953	"Taking a Chance on Love"	MGM Records	78 rpm	?	1953

In 1958, she recorded a full-length album for Verve Records featuring Oscar Peterson with Herb Ellis, Ray Brown, and Alvin Stoller (Catalogue #314 547-514 2) that remained unreleased in the vaults until a CD release in 1999. This CD also included four tracks from 1961 (with an unknown orchestra) that included one 45 rpm record single and another aborted single:

Recorded	Song title	Label	Release	Catalogue No.	Issued
1958	"It's Easy to Remember"	Verve	Unreleased	21942-3	1999 (CD only)
1958	"What Is There to Say"	Verve	Unreleased	21943-6	1999 (CD only)
1958	"That Old Feeling"	Verve	Unreleased	21944-4	1999 (CD only)
1958	"The Touch of Your Lips"	Verve	Unreleased	21945-12	1999 (CD only)
1958	"When Your Lover Has Gone"	Verve	Unreleased	21946-1	1999 (CD only)
1958	"The Nearness of You"	Verve	Unreleased	21947-7	1999 (CD only)
1958	"I'm Glad There Is You"	Verve	Unreleased	21948-10	1999 (CD only)
1958	"I've Grown Accustomed to Her Face"	Verve	Unreleased	21949-4	1999 (CD only)
1958	"Body and Soul"	Verve	Unreleased	21950-2	1999 (CD only)
1958	"How Long Has This Been Going On?"	Verve	Unreleased	21951-6	1999 (CD only)
1958	"I've Got a Crush on You"	Verve	Unreleased	21952-3	1999 (CD only)
1958	"I Didn't Know What Time It Was"	Verve	Unreleased	21953-3	1999 (CD only)
1961	"Somebody"		45 rpm single V10231	23459-2	1961
1961	"Stay with It"		45 rpm single V10231	23460-4	1961
1961	"It's a Beautiful Evening"		Unissued single	23461-5	1961 (CD only)
1961	"Smooth Operator"		Unissued single	23462-2	1961 (CD only)

The tracks "It's a Beautiful Evening" and "Smooth Operator" were aborted for release as a single and remained in the Verve vaults until the Smooth Operator release in 1999. These are the only known songs Dandridge recorded on vinyl. Several songs she sang, including her version of "Cow-Cow Boogie" were filmed for Soundies and are not included on this list.

== Filmography ==
=== As an actress ===
Year	Film title	Role	Notes
1935	Mississippi	double for one of The Cabin Kids	uncredited
1935	Teacher's Beau	Dorothy	
1936	The Big Broadcast of 1936	member of the Dandridge Sisters	
1937	Easy to Take	Member of the Dandridge Sisters	uncredited
1937	It Can't Last Forever	Dandridge Sisters Act	uncredited
1937	A Day at the Races	Singer/dancer in ensemble	uncredited
1938	Going Places	Member of the Dandridge Sisters	uncredited
1938	Snow Gets in Your Eyes	one of the Dandridge Sisters	
1940	Irene	The Dandridge Sisters	uncredited
1940	Four Shall Die	Helen Fielding	alternative title: Condemned Men
1941	Bahama Passage	Thalia	
1941	Sundown	Kipsang's Bride	
1941	Sun Valley Serenade	Specialty Act	"Chattanooga Choo Choo" [with the Nicholas Brothers]
1941	Lady from Louisiana	Felice	alternative title: Lady from New Orleans
1942	Lucky Jordan	Hollyhock School Maid	uncredited
1942	Night in New Orleans	Sal, Shadrach's Girl	uncredited
1942	The Night Before the Divorce	Maid	uncredited
1942	Ride 'Em Cowboy	Dancer	uncredited
1942	Drums of the Congo	Princess Malimi	
1942	Orchestra Wives	Singer/Dancer	
1943	Hit Parade of 1943	Count Basie Band Singer	alternative title: Change of Heart
1943	Happy Go Lucky	Showgirl	uncredited
1944	Since You Went Away	Black Officer's Wife in Train Station	uncredited
1944	Atlantic City	Singer	alternative title: Atlantic City Honeymoon; Uncredited
1945	Pillow to Post	Herself-Vocalist	uncredited
1947	Ebony Parade	Herself-Vocalist	uncredited
1951	Tarzan's Peril	Melmendi, Queen of the Ashuba	
1951	The Harlem Globetrotters	Ann Carpenter	
1953	Remains to Be Seen	Herself-Night Club Vocalist	sings "Taking a Chance on Love"
1953	Bright Road	Jane Richards	
1954	Carmen Jones	Carmen Jones	nominated – Academy Award for Best Actress nominated – BAFTA Award for Best Actress in a Leading Role
1957	Island in the Sun	Margot Seaton	
1958	Tamango	Aiché, Reiker's mistress	
1958	The Decks Ran Red	Mahia	alternative titles: Infamy; La Rivolta dell'esperanza (foreign releases)
1959	Porgy and Bess	Bess	nominated – Golden Globe Award for Best Actress – Motion Picture Comedy or Musical
1960	Malaga	Gianna	alternative tiles: Moment of Danger
1961	The Murder Men	Norma Sherman	TV pilot for Cain's Hundred
1962	Cain's Hundred	Norma Sherman	episode: "Blues for a Junkman"

=== As herself ===
- Cavalcade of Stars (1952; 1 episode)
- Songs for Sale (1952; 1 episode)
- The Colgate Comedy Hour (1951–1953; 2 episodes)
- The George Jessel Show (1954; 1 episode)
- Light's Diamond Jubilee (1954) TV special broadcast on all four TV networks
- The 27th Annual Academy Awards (1955; TV special; nominee and presenter)
- Val Parnell's Sunday Night at the London Palladium (1956; 1 episode)
- Ford Star Jubilee (1956; 1 episode)
- The 29th Annual Academy Awards (1957; TV special; performer and presenter)
- The Ed Sullivan Show (1952–1961; 7 episodes)
- Juxe Box Jury (1964; 1 episode)

== Stage work ==
- Swingin' the Dream (1939)
- Meet the People (1941)
- Jump for Joy (1941)
- Sweet 'n Hot (1944)
- Crazy Girls (1952)
- West Side Story (1962)
- Show Boat (1964)
