= Ruby Dandridge =

American actress (1900–1987)

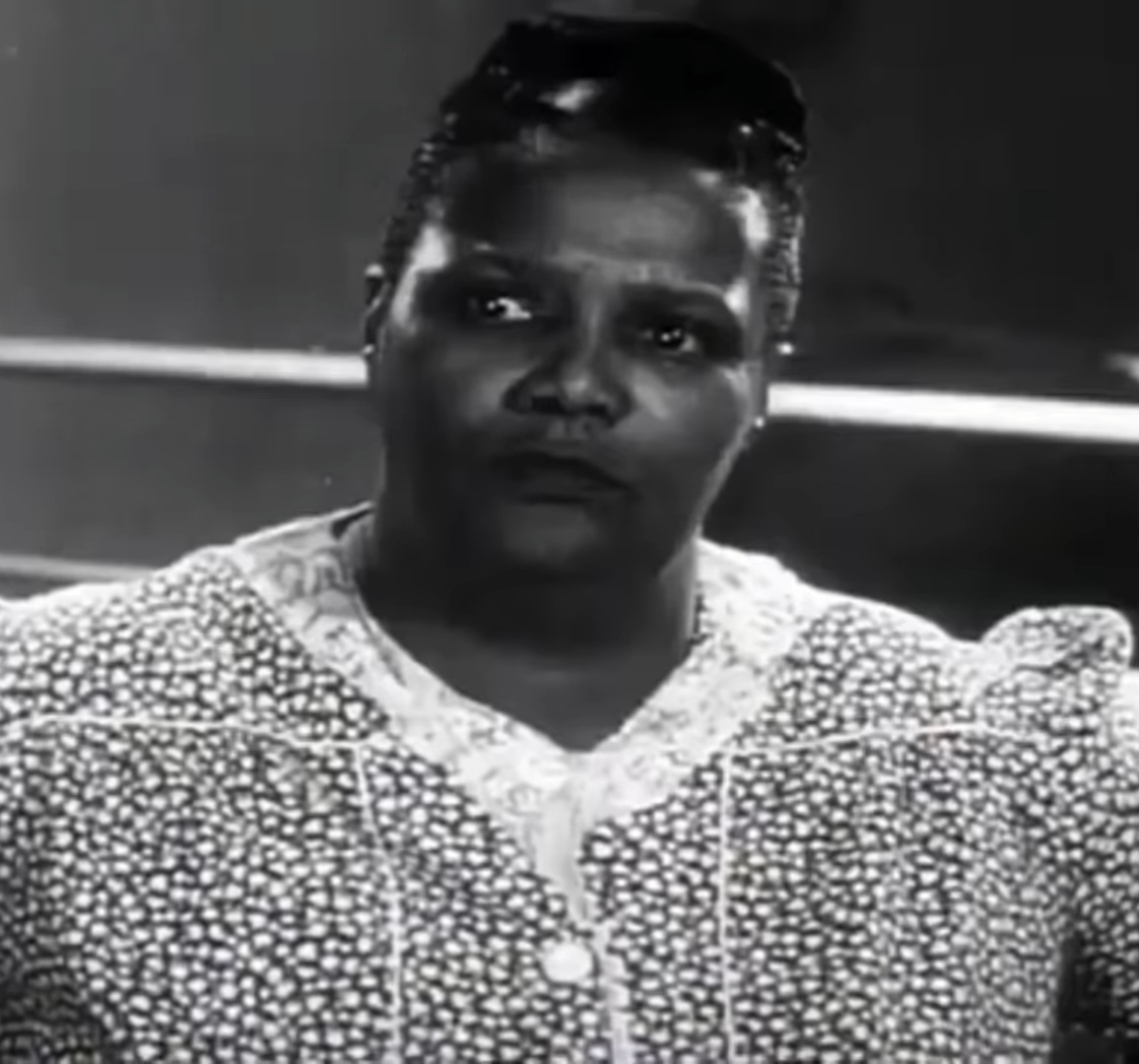
- Dandridge in Home in Oklahoma (1946)
- Born: Ruby Jean Butler; March 3, 1900; Wichita, Kansas, U.S.
- Died: October 17, 1987 (aged 87); Los Angeles, California, U.S.
- Resting place: Forest Lawn Memorial Park, Glendale
- Occupation: Actress
- Years active: 1917–1962
- Spouse: Cyril Dandridge (m. 1919; div. 1922)
- Partner: Geneva Williams
- Children: Vivian Dandridge; Dorothy Dandridge
- Family: Harolyn Suzanne Nicholas (granddaughter) Nayo Wallace (great-granddaughter)

Ruby Jean Dandridge (née Butler; March 3, 1900 – October 17, 1987) was an American actress from the early 1900s through to the late 1950s. Dandridge is best known for her role on the radio show Amos 'n Andy, in which she played Sadie Blake and Harriet Crawford, and on radio's Judy Canova Show, in which she played Geranium. She is recognized for her role in the 1959 movie A Hole in the Head as Sally. In the 1999 film Introducing Dorothy Dandridge, Ruby is portrayed by Loretta Devine.

== Early life ==
Dandridge was born Ruby Jean Butler in Wichita, Kansas, on March 3, 1900, one of four children of George Butler, a janitor, grocer and entertainer (famous as a "minstrel man"), and Nellie Simon, a maid.

== Entertainment career ==
Over the course of her entertainment career, Dandridge appeared in film, on radio, on television, and on stage as a singer.

In 1937, she played one of the witches in what an article in The Pittsburgh Courier called a "sepia representation" of Macbeth in Los Angeles. California. The production began on July 8 at the Mayan Theater. Five years later, she appeared in a production of Hit the Deck at the Curran Theatre in San Francisco, California. One of Dandridge's earliest appearances (uncredited, as were many of the minor roles she played) was as a native dancer in King Kong (1933). In other films, she played Rheba, a maid, in Junior Miss (1945), Dabby in Tap Roots (1948), the housekeeper in Three Little Girls in Blue (1946), Mrs. Kelso in Cabin in the Sky (1943) and Violet in Tish (1942).

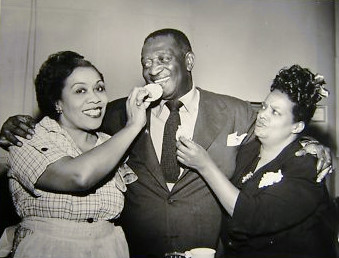
Lillian Randolph, Ernest Whitman, and Ruby Dandridge of the radio cast of The Beulah Show circa 1952–1953.

Dandridge played Oriole on both radio and TV versions of The Beulah Show, and Geranium in The Judy Canova Show, and was a regular cast member on Tonight at Hoagy's. She is heard as Raindrop on Gene Autry's Melody Ranch (August 1949 - April 1951). For one season (1961–1962), Dandridge played the maid on the television version of Father of the Bride.

In the 1950s, Dandridge formed a nightclub act that played in clubs around Los Angeles. A review of her act cited her "flashes of effervescent showmanship" and stated "What Ruby lacks in her voice, she invariably makes up for it with her winsome personality."

== Real estate venture ==
In 1955, Dandridge and her business partner Dorothy Foster bought land in Twentynine Palms, California, with plans to construct a subdivision of 250 homes.

== Personal life ==
On September 30, 1919, she married Cyril Dandridge. Dandridge moved with her husband to Cleveland, Ohio, where her daughter, actress Vivian Dandridge, was born in 1921. Her second daughter, Academy Award-nominated actress Dorothy Dandridge, was born there in 1922, five months after Ruby and Cyril divorced. It is noted that after her divorce, Dandridge became involved with her companion Geneva Williams, who reportedly overworked the children and punished them harshly. Dandridge attended her daughter Dorothy's funeral in 1965.

== Death ==
On October 17, 1987, Dandridge died of a heart attack at a nursing home in Los Angeles, California. She was interred next to Dorothy at Forest Lawn Memorial Park Cemetery in Glendale, California.

== Filmography ==
=== Features ===
Year	Title	Role	Notes
1933	King Kong	Native Dancer	Uncredited
1934	Black Moon	Black House Servant	Uncredited
1939	Midnight Shadow	Mrs. Lingley	
1940	Broken Strings	Dancer	Uncredited
1942	The Night Before the Divorce	One of Roselle's Fans	Uncredited
1942	Gallant Lady	Sarah	
1942	Tish	Violet	Uncredited
1942	The War Against Mrs. Hadley	Maid	Uncredited
1942	Broken Strings	Dancer	Uncredited
1943	A Night for Crime	Alice Jones - Cook	Uncredited
1943	Cabin in the Sky	Mrs. Kelso	
1943	Corregidor	Hyacinth	
1943	Melody Parade	Ruby	
1943	I Dood It	Mammy, in the Show	Uncredited
1943	Never a Dull Moment	Daisy	Uncredited
1944	Hat Check Honey	Ophelia	Uncredited
1944	Ladies of Washington	Nellie	Uncredited
1944	Carolina Blues	Josephine	Uncredited
1944	Can't Help Singing	Henrietta	Uncredited
1945	The Clock	Milk Customer	Uncredited
1945	Junior Miss	Rheba	
1945	Saratoga Trunk	Turbaned Vendor	Uncredited
1946	Inside Job	Ivory	Uncredited
1946	Three Little Girls in Blue	Mammy	Uncredited
1946	Home in Oklahoma	Devoria	
1947	Dead Reckoning	Hyacinth	
1947	The Arnelo Affair	Maybelle - Parkson's Maid	
1947	My Wild Irish Rose	Della	
1948	Tap Roots	Dabby	
1950	Father Is a Bachelor	Lily	Uncredited
1959	A Hole in the Head	Sally	

=== Short subjects ===
Year	Title	Role	Notes
1943	Flop Goes the Weasel	Mammy Hen	Voice, uncredited
1946	Screen Snapshots: The Judy Canova Show	Geranium, Radio Show Character	
1948	Silly Billie	Maid	

=== Television ===
Year	Title	Role	Notes
1951-1955	The Amos 'n' Andy Show	Various roles	4 episodes
1952-1953	The Beulah Show	Oriole	
1956	Front Row Center	Winnie	Episode: "The Human Touch"
1956	NBC Matinee Theater	Belle	Episode: "Strong Medicine"
1957	Lux Video Theatre	Belle	Episode: "Dark Hammock"
1959	Yancy Derringer	Lily Rose Beam	Episode: "V as in Voodoo"
1960	Checkmate	Ellen	Episode: "The Princess in the Tower"
1961	The Dick Powell Show	Margaret	Episode: "Goodbye, Hannah"
1961-1962	Father of the Bride	Delilah	
