= Donald Bogle =

American film historian

Donald Bogle is an American film historian and author of six books concerning black history in film and on television. He is an instructor at New York University's Tisch School of the Arts and at the University of Pennsylvania.

== Early years ==
Bogle grew up in a suburb of Philadelphia and graduated from Lincoln University in 1966. As a child, he spent a lot of time watching television and going to the movies. He wondered why there were very few black characters. He also wondered what happened to the black characters when they went off-screen. In a 2005 interview, Bogle recalled:

In the movie Gone with the Wind, where did Hattie McDaniel live—in the big house or the slaves' quarters? What did she think about the Civil War? These were all questions I wanted answers to.

== Career ==
Bogle's first book, Toms, Coons, Mulattoes, Mammies and Bucks: An Interpretative History of Blacks in Films, was published in 1973. In it, he identified five basic stereotypical film roles available to black actors and actresses: the servile, avuncular "tom"; the simple-minded and cowardly "coon"; the tragic, and usually female, mulatto; the fat, dark-skinned "mammy"; and the irrational, hypersexual male "buck". In the second edition of the book, Bogle identified a sixth stereotype: the sidekick, who is usually asexual. Toms, Coons, Mulattoes, Mammies and Bucks was awarded the 1973 Theatre Library Association Award.

Brown Sugar: Eighty Years of America's Black Female Superstars was published in 1980. It was the basis of "Brown Sugar," a four-hour PBS documentary that aired in 1986.

Bogle published his third book, Blacks in American Film and Television: An Illustrated Encyclopedia, in 1988.

Bogle's next book, a biography of actress Dorothy Dandridge (1922–1965), caused a sensation before its 1997 publication. It sparked renewed interest in Dandridge's life, and several Black performers raced to make a film about her. Whitney Houston acquired the rights to produce a movie based on Bogle's biography, but Halle Berry brought Introducing Dorothy Dandridge to fruition.

Bogle published Primetime Blues: African Americans on Network Television in 2001. In it, he argued that television lags behind film in reflecting the social realities of blacks.

His next book, Bright Boulevards, Bold Dreams: The Story of Black Hollywood, was published in 2005. It tells the story of black actors and actresses in the film industry during the first half of the 20th century.

In 2011, he published Heat Wave: The Life and Career of Ethel Waters, which examines the personal and professional life of singer and stage performer, Ethel Waters.

His most recent book is titled, Lena Horne: Goddess Reclaimed which was published in 2023, a first-of-its-kind comprehensive and lavish biography of Hollywood’s first African American movie goddess, Lena Horne.

== Bibliography ==
- Toms, Coons, Mulattoes, Mammies and Bucks: An Interpretive History of Blacks in Films, Viking Press, 1973. OCLC 245700105. 2001: 4th ed. New York: Continuum. ISBN 0-8264-1267-X
- Brown Sugar: Eighty Years of America's Black Female Superstars, Harmony Books, 1980. ISBN 0-517-53637-4.
- Blacks in American Film and Television: An Illustrated Encyclopedia, Garland, 1988. ISBN 0-8240-8715-1.
- Dorothy Dandridge: A Biography, Amistad Press, 1997. ISBN 1-56743-034-1.
- Primetime Blues: African Americans on Network Television, Farrar, Straus and Giroux, 2001. ISBN 0-374-23720-4.
- Bright Boulevards, Bold Dreams: The Story of Black Hollywood, One World Ballantine Books, 2005. ISBN 0-345-45418-9.
- Heat Wave: The Life and Career of Ethel Waters, HarperCollins, 2011. ISBN 0-06-124173-3.
