= Cotton Club =

Jazz club in New York City

Coordinates: 40.819°N 73.937°W

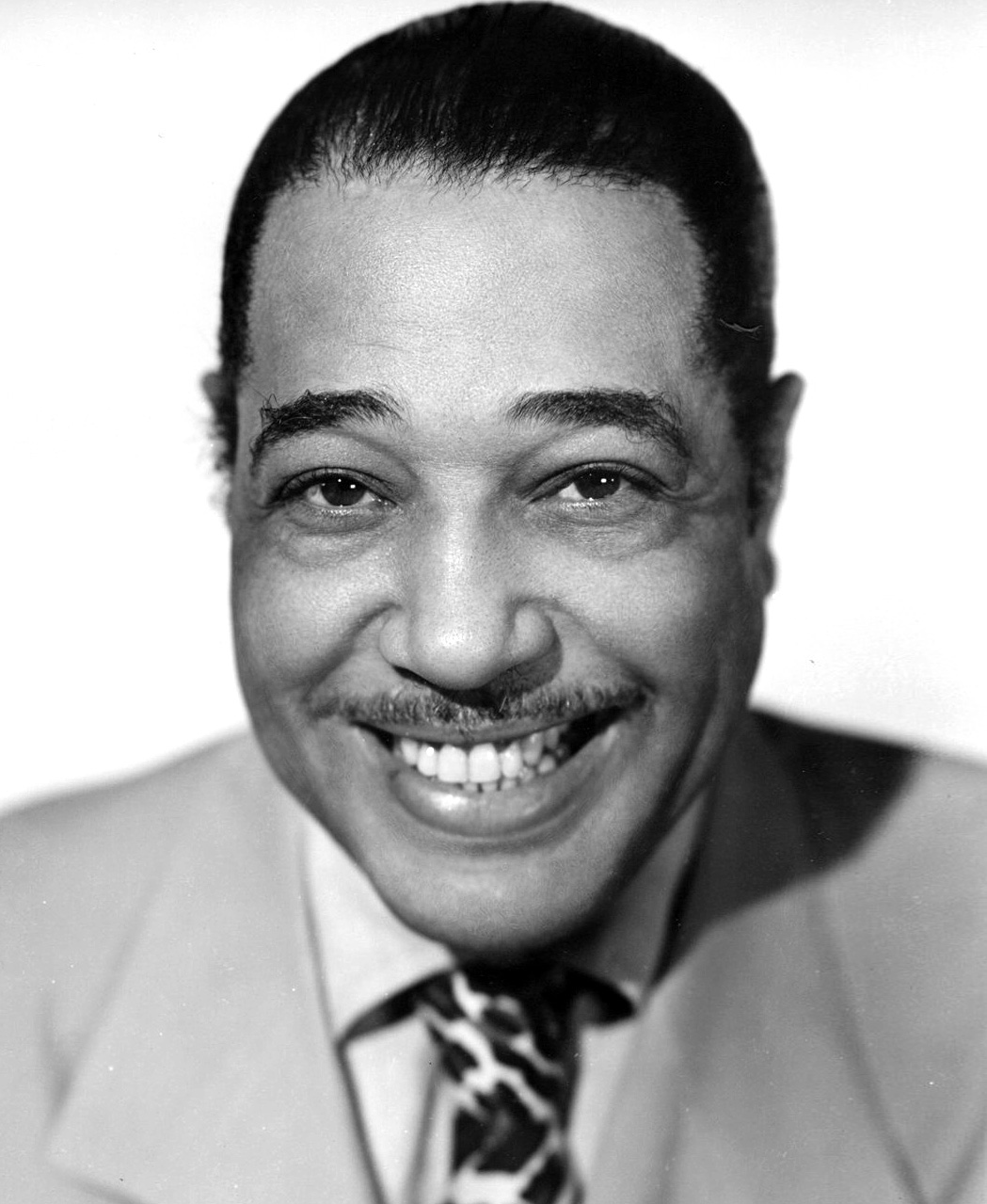
Duke Ellington was one of the original Cotton Club orchestra leaders.

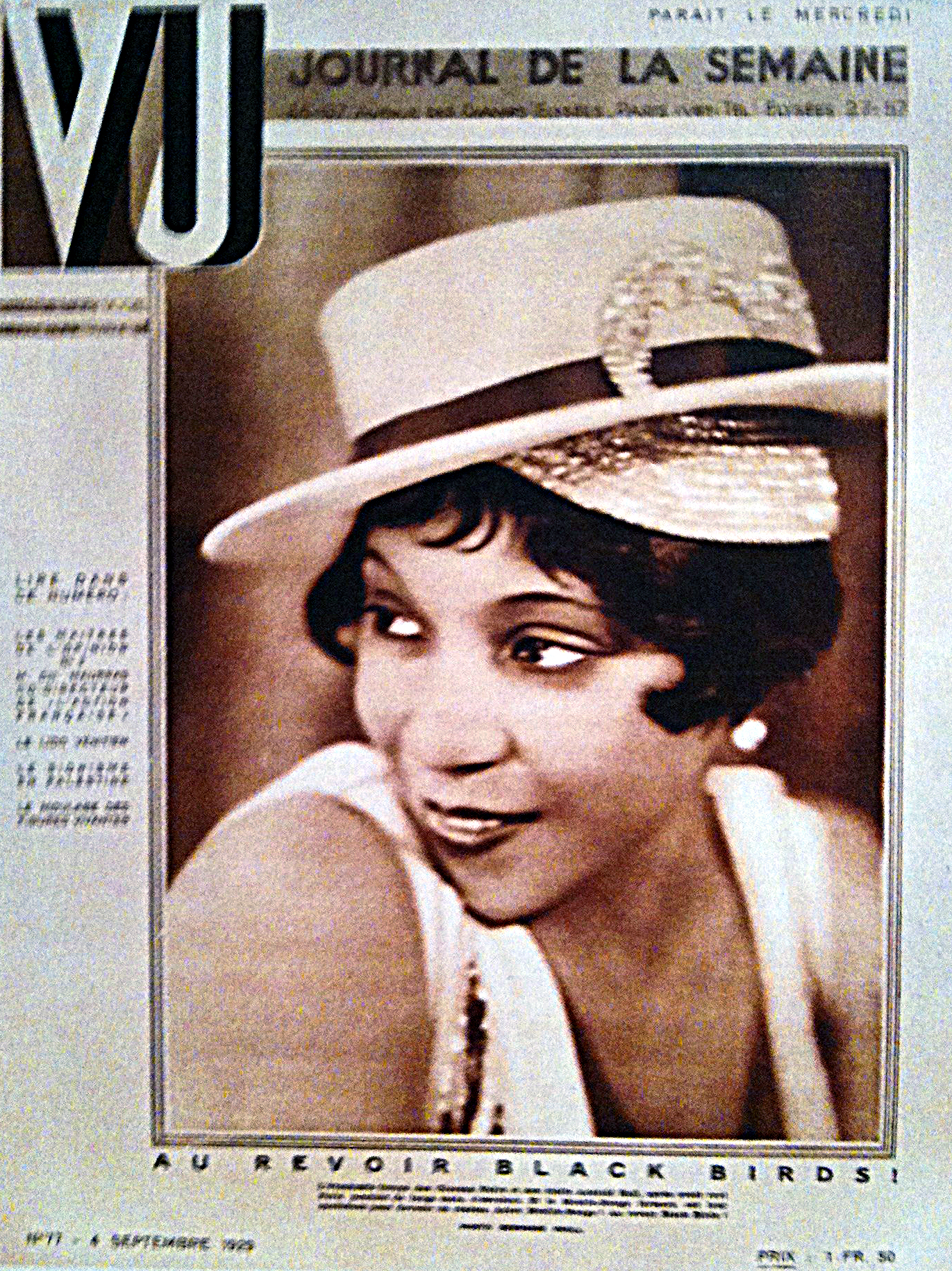
Adelaide Hall, star of the Cotton Club

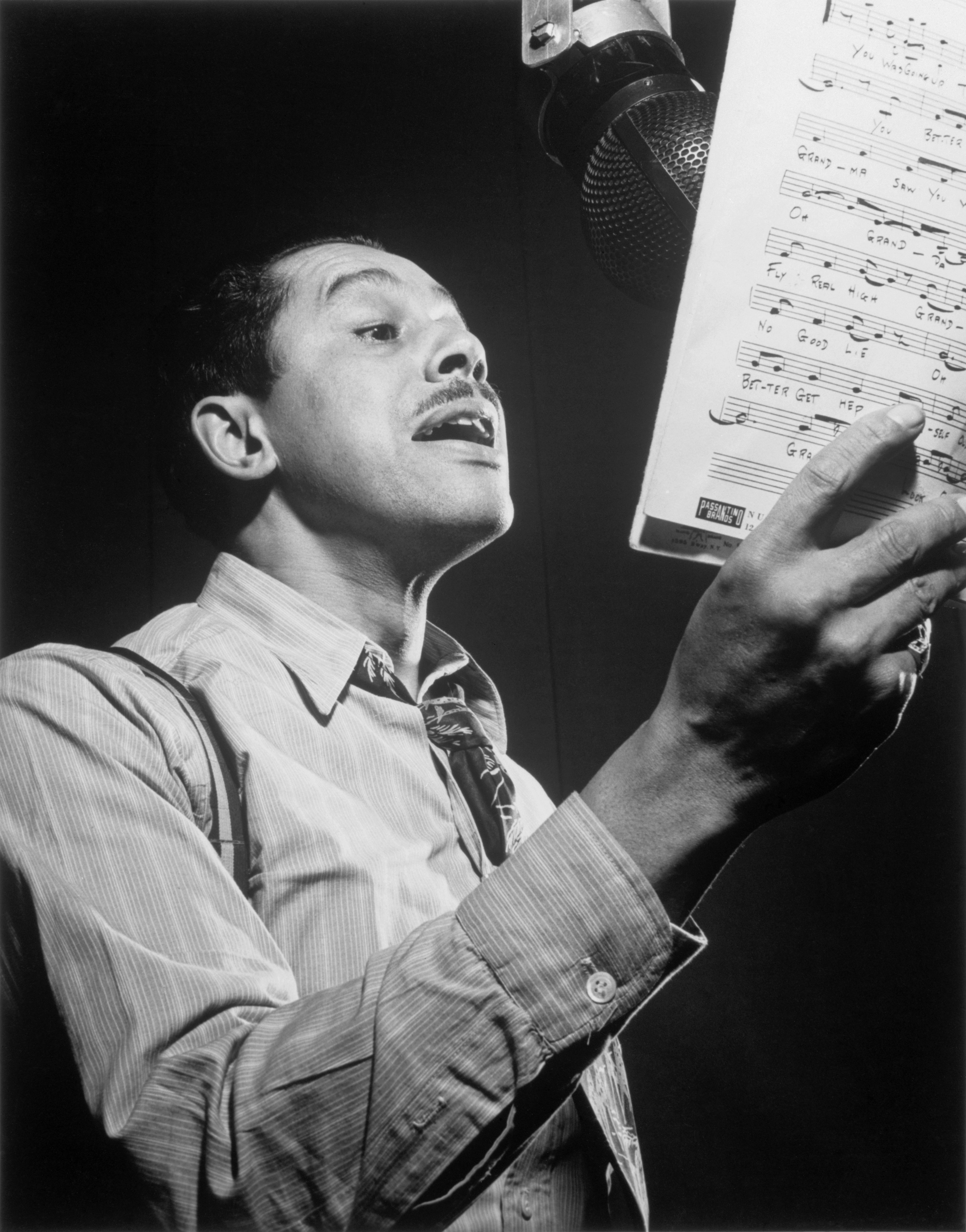
Cab Calloway was another of the original Cotton Club performers.

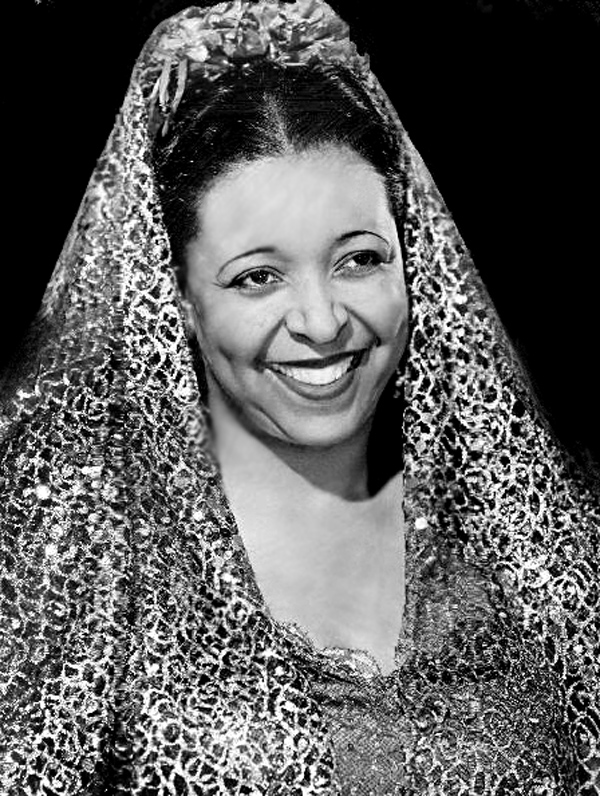
Ethel Waters starred at the Cotton Club

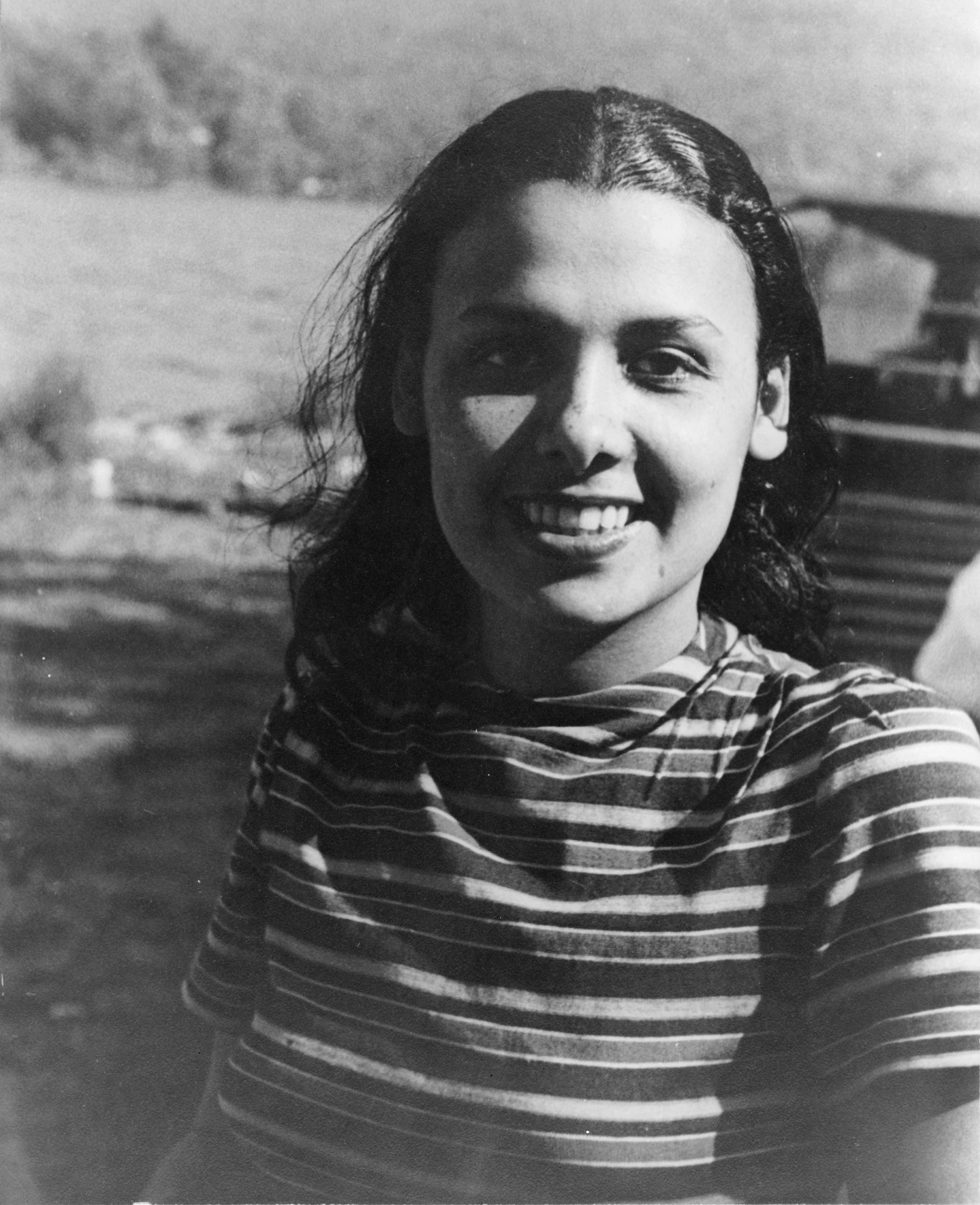
Lena Horne as a young girl was featured at the Cotton Club.

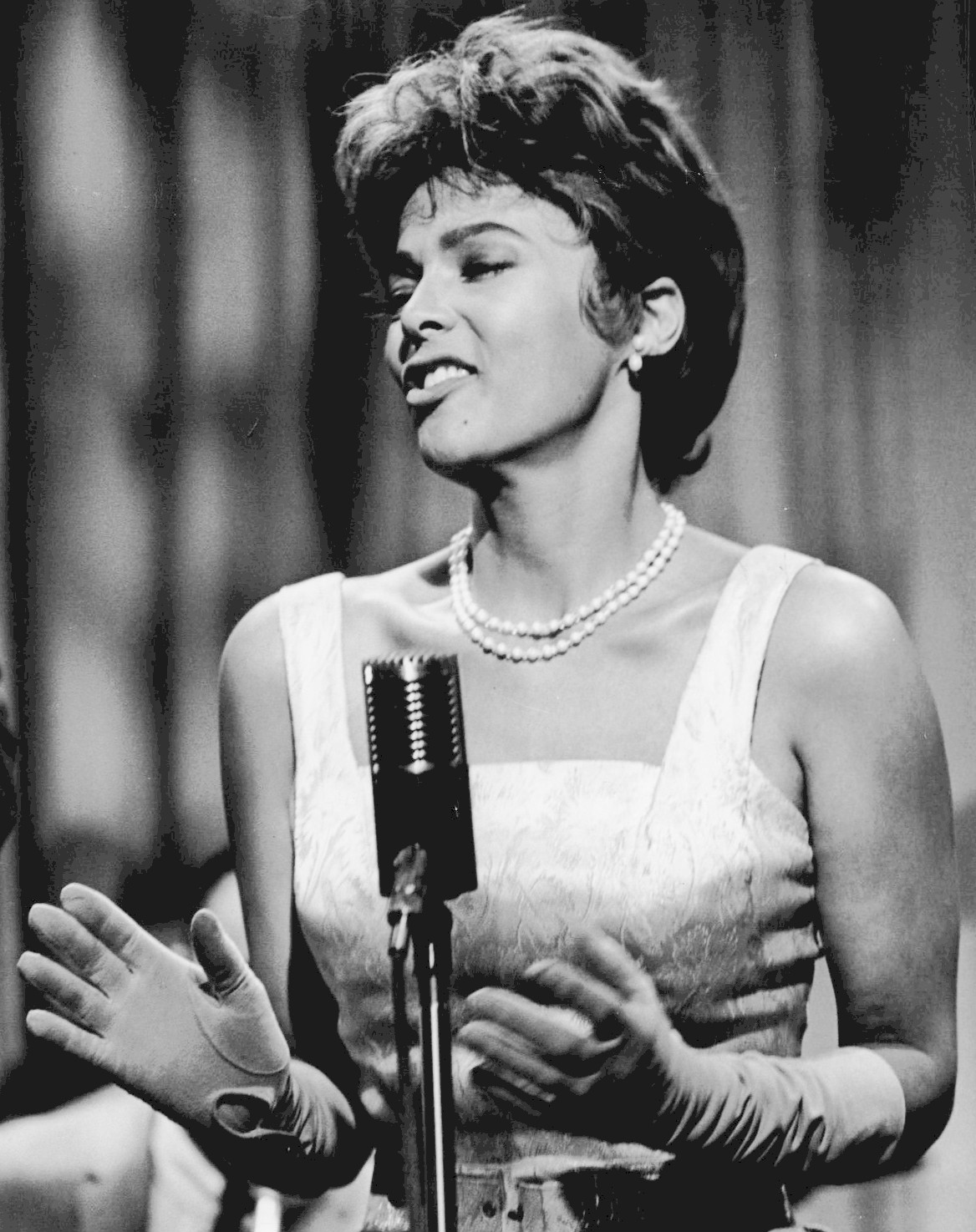
Dorothy Dandridge, entertainer at the Cotton Club

The Cotton Club was a 20th-century nightclub in New York City. It was located on 142nd Street and Lenox Avenue from 1923 to 1936, then briefly in the midtown Theater District until 1940. The club operated during the United States' era of Prohibition and Jim Crow era racial segregation. Black people initially could not patronize the Cotton Club, but the venue featured many of the most popular black entertainers of the era, including musicians Fletcher Henderson, Duke Ellington, Jimmie Lunceford, Chick Webb, Louis Armstrong, Count Basie, Fats Waller, Willie Bryant; vocalists Adelaide Hall, Ethel Waters, Cab Calloway, Bessie Smith, Lillie Delk Christian, Aida Ward, Avon Long, the Dandridge Sisters, the Will Vodery choir, The Mills Brothers, Nina Mae McKinney, Billie Holiday, Midge Williams, Lena Horne, and dancers such as Katherine Dunham, Bill Robinson, The Nicholas Brothers, Charles 'Honi' Coles, Leonard Reed, Stepin Fetchit, the Berry Brothers, The Four Step Brothers, Jeni Le Gon and Earl Snakehips Tucker.

In its prime, the Cotton Club served as a hip meeting spot, with regular "Celebrity Nights" on Sundays featuring guests including Jimmy Durante, George Gershwin, Sophie Tucker, Paul Robeson, Al Jolson, Mae West, Richard Rodgers, Irving Berlin, Eddie Cantor, Fanny Brice, Langston Hughes, Judy Garland, Moss Hart, and Jimmy Walker.

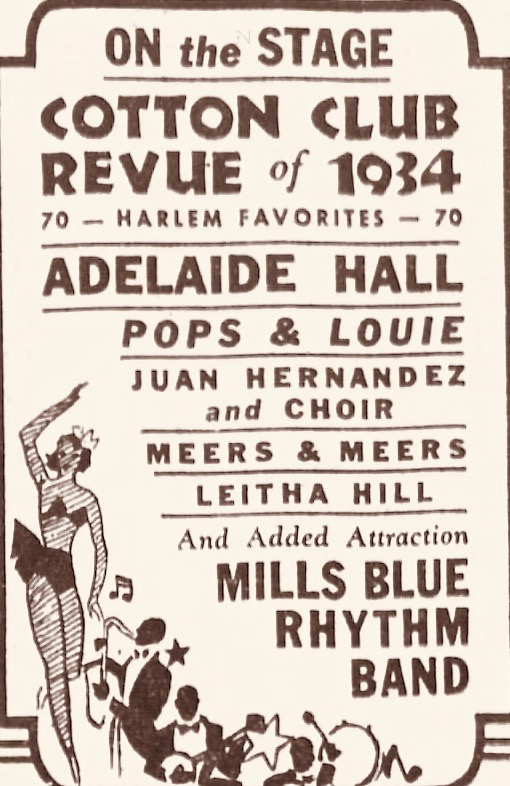
Adelaide Hall starring in the Cotton Club Revue of 1934 at the Loew's Metropolitan Theater, Brooklyn, commencing on 7 September 1934 (advertisement)

== History ==
In 1920, heavyweight boxing champion Jack Johnson rented the upper floor of the building on the corner of 142nd Street and Lenox Avenue in the heart of Harlem and opened an intimate supper club called the Club Deluxe. Owney Madden, a prominent bootlegger and gangster, acquired the club following his release from Sing Sing Correctional Facility in 1923, and the venue's name was changed to the Cotton Club. The two arranged a deal that allowed Johnson to remain the club's manager. Madden "used the Cotton Club as an outlet to sell his #1 beer to the prohibition crowd".

When the club closed briefly in 1925 for selling liquor, it soon reopened without interference from the police. An extensive drink list continued to be available on the Cotton Club menu and sold to white guests following the shutdown. Herman Stark then became the stage manager. Harlem producer Leonard Harper directed the first two of three opening night floor-shows at the new venue.

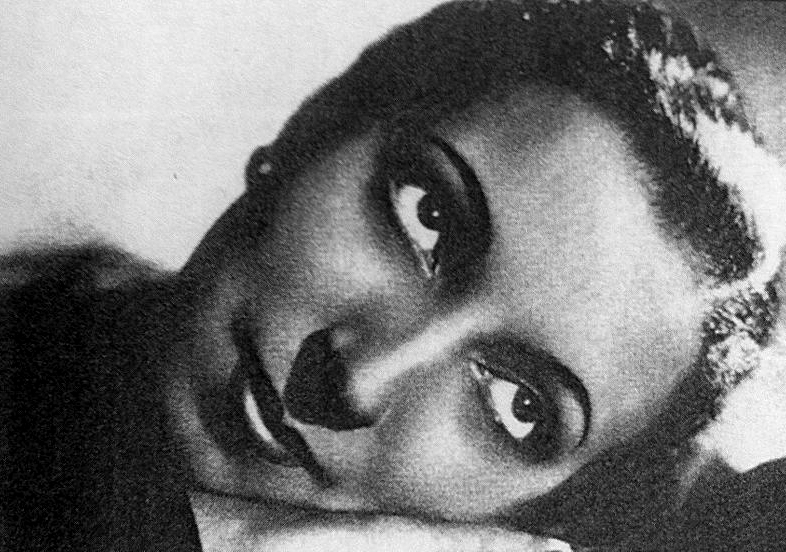
Cotton Club dancer Mildred Dixon – Duke Ellington's second companion

The Cotton Club was a whites-only establishment with rare exceptions for black celebrities such as Ethel Waters and Bill Robinson. It reproduced the racist imagery of the era, often depicting black people as savages in exotic jungles or as "darkies" in the plantation South. A 1938 menu included this imagery, with illustrations done by Julian Harrison, showing naked black men and women dancing around a drum in the jungle. Tribal mask illustrations make up the border of the menu.

The club imposed a subtler color line on the chorus girls, whom the club presented in skimpy outfits. They were expected to be "tall, tan, and terrific", which meant they had to be at least 5'6" tall, light-skinned, and under 21 years of age. The male dancers', the Cotton Club Boys, skin colors were more varied. "Black performers did not mix with the club's clientele, and after the show many of them went next door to the basement of the superintendent at 646 Lenox, where they imbibed corn whiskey, peach brandy, and marijuana."

Ellington was expected to write "jungle music" for a white audience; Ellington's contributions to the Cotton Club were priceless, as described in this 1937 New York Times excerpt: "So long may the empirical Duke and his music making roosters reign—and long may the Cotton Club continue to remember that it came down from Harlem". Entrance was expensive for customers, and it included a two-dollar minimum cover fee on weekdays for food and drink, so the performers were well compensated.

=== The Harlem years ===
Shows at the Cotton Club were musical revues, and several were called "Cotton Club Parade" followed by the year. Musical revues were created twice a year in hopes of becoming successful Broadway shows. The revues featured dancers, singers, comedians, and variety acts, as well as a house band. These revues helped launch the careers of many artists, including Andy Preer, who led the Cotton Club's first house band in 1923. Duke Ellington's orchestra was the house band from December 4, 1927, until June 30, 1931.

The first revue that Ellington's orchestra performed was called the "Creole Revue" and featured Adelaide Hall. Hall had just recorded several songs with Ellington, including "Creole Love Call", a worldwide hit. The club gave Ellington national exposure through radio broadcasts originating there, first over WHN, then over WEAF, and after September 1929 on Fridays over the NBC Red Network, for which WEAF was the flagship station.

The club also enabled him to develop his repertoire while composing dance tunes for the shows as well as overtures, transitions, accompaniments, and "jungle" effects, giving him a freedom to experiment with orchestral arrangements that touring bands rarely experienced. Ellington recorded more than 100 compositions during this period. Eventually, responding to Ellington's request, the club slightly relaxed its policy of segregation.

Cab Calloway's orchestra brought its "Brown Sugar" revue to the club on September 28, 1930, replacing Ellington's orchestra after its departure on February 4, 1931. Jimmie Lunceford's band replaced Calloway's in 1934. Ellington, Calloway, and Louis Armstrong returned to perform at the club in later years. Lena Horne (Leona Laviscount) began at the Cotton Club as a chorus girl at the age of sixteen, and sang "Sweeter than Sweet" with Calloway. Dorothy Dandridge performed at the club while part of the Dandridge Sisters, and Coleman Hawkins and Don Redman played at the club as part of Henderson's band. Tap dancers Bill "Bojangles" Robinson, Sammy Davis Jr. (as part of the Will Mastin Trio), and the Nicholas Brothers performed at the club as well.

Another notable "Cotton Club Parade" in 1933 featured Ethel Waters, and Duke Ellington performing Stormy Weather. Later this performance would also include Lena Horne, and Katherine Dunham in the film adaptation of Stormy Weather. The club also drew from white popular culture. Walter Brooks, who had produced the successful Broadway show Shuffle Along, was the club's nominal owner. Dorothy Fields and Jimmy McHugh, one of the most prominent songwriting teams of the era, and Harold Arlen wrote the songs for the revues, one of which, Blackbirds of 1928, starring Adelaide Hall, featured the songs "I Can't Give You Anything But Love" and "Diga Diga Doo", produced by Lew Leslie on Broadway.

In 1934, Hall starred in the "Cotton Club Parade 1934", the highest-grossing show ever to appear at the club. The show opened on March 11, 1934, and ran for six months, attracting over 600,000 paying customers. The score was written by Harold Arlen and Ted Koehler and featured the classic song "Ill Wind". During Hall's performance of "Ill Wind", a dry-ice machine was used to create a fog effect, the first time such equipment had been used on a stage. Sixteen-year-old Lena Horne was also featured on the bill. After appearing at the Cotton Club the entire show starring Adelaide Hall was taken out on a road tour across America.

=== The Midtown years ===
The club closed temporarily in 1936 after the race riot in Harlem the previous year. Carl Van Vechten had vowed to boycott the club for having in place such racist policies as refusing entry to African Americans. The Cotton Club reopened later that year at Broadway and 48th. The site chosen for the new Cotton Club was a big room on the top floor of a building where Broadway and Seventh Avenue meet, an important midtown crossroads at the center of the Great White Way, the Broadway Theater District.

Stark and the club's owners were quite certain the club would succeed in this new location, but they realized that success depended on a popular opening show. A 1937 New York Times article states, "The Cotton Club has climbed aboard the Broadway bandwagon, with a show that is calculated to give the customers their money's worth of sound and color—and it does."

The most extravagant revue in the club's 13-year history opened on September 24, 1936, with Robinson and Calloway leading a roster of approximately 130 performers. Stark paid Bill "Bojangles" Robinson $3,500 a week, the highest salary ever paid to a black entertainer in a Broadway production and a higher salary than had ever been paid to any nightclub entertainer.

In June 1935, the Cotton Club opened its doors to black patrons. In preparation for the Joe Louis fight, the club planned a gala and "extended an open invitation to the Sepians." That same year, the club was forced to close its doors due to the Harlem race riot, only to reopen one year later at Broadway and 48th Street. Calloway and Robinson were the house act and were paid $3,500 per week (which was reportedly the most ever paid to a nightclub performer at the time).

The club closed permanently in 1940 under pressure from higher rents, changing taste, and a federal investigation into the alleged tax evasion of Manhattan nightclub owners. The Latin Quarter nightclub opened in its space and the building was torn down in 1989 to build a hotel. The Broadway Cotton Club successfully blended the old and new; the site was new, and the décor was slightly different, but once a customer was seated, it felt like a familiar place.

=== Langston Hughes' critique ===
Madden's goal for the Cotton Club was to provide "an authentic black entertainment to a wealthy, whites-only audience." Langston Hughes, a key figure of the Harlem Renaissance, attended the Cotton Club as a rare black customer. Following his visit, Hughes criticized the club's segregated atmosphere and commented that it was "a Jim Crow club for gangsters and monied whites."

In addition to the "jungle music" and plantation-themed interior, Hughes believed that Madden's idea of "authentic black entertainment" was similar to the entertainment provided at a zoo and that white "strangers were given the best ringside tables to sit and stare at the Negro customers - like amusing animals in a zoo."

Hughes also believed that the Cotton Club negatively affected the Harlem community. The club brought an "influx of whites toward Harlem after sundown, flooding the little cabarets and bars where formerly only colored people laughed and sang." Hughes also mentioned how many of the neighboring cabarets, especially black cabarets, were forced to close due to the competition from the Cotton Club. These smaller clubs did not have large floors or music by famous entertainers such as Ellington.

=== Other "Cotton Clubs" ===
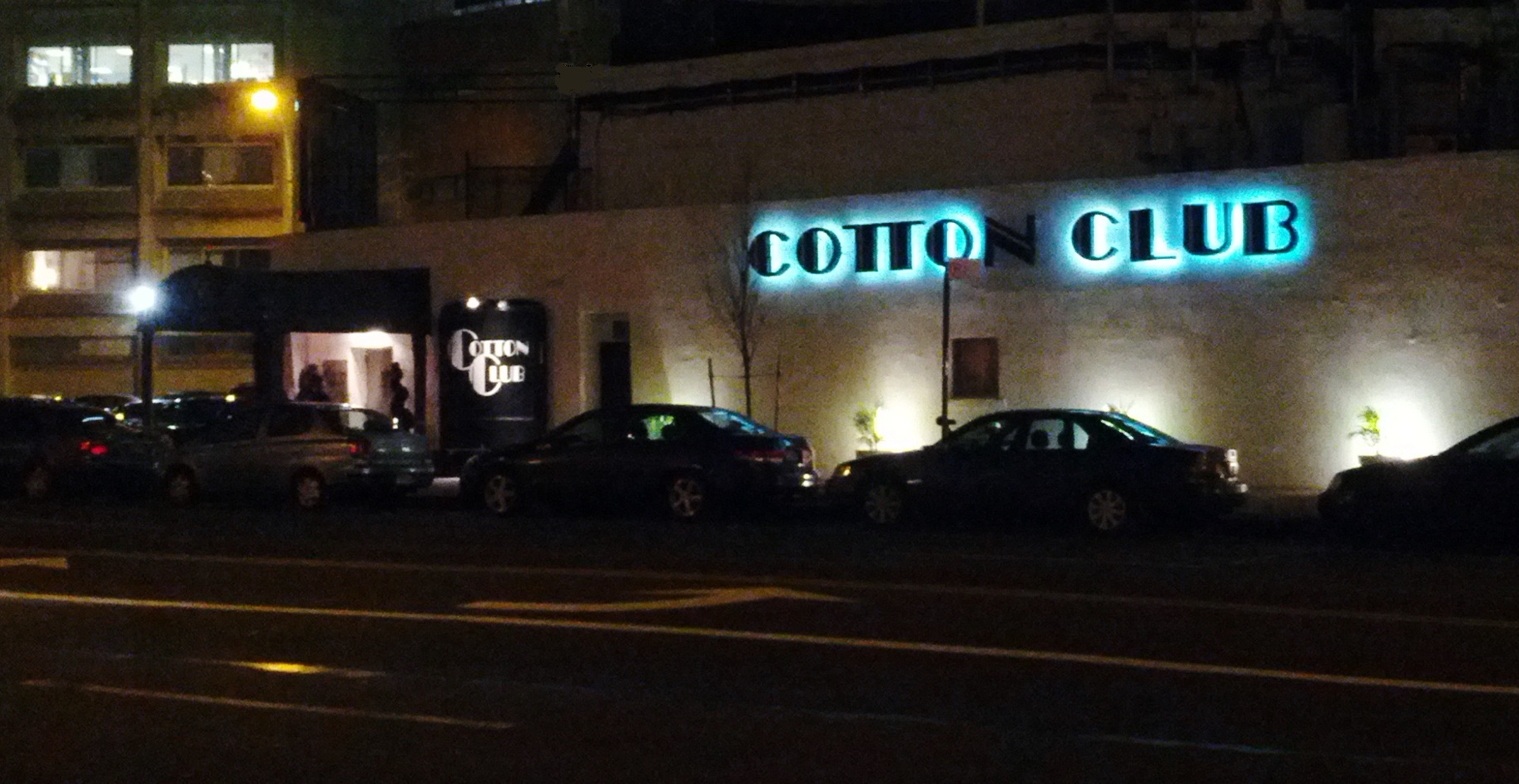
Cotton Club on 125th Street in New York City, December 2013.

An incarnation of the Cotton Club opened on 125th Street in West Harlem in 1978. James Haskins wrote at the time, "Today, there is a new incarnation of the Cotton Club that sits on the most western end of the 125th Street under the massive Manhattanville viaduct. The windowless block of a building has a less dramatic display out front but seems to be popular with tourists for Sunday jazz brunches."

A Chicago branch of the Cotton Club was run by Ralph Capone, and a California branch was located in Culver City during the late 1920s and early 1930s, featuring performers from the original Cotton Club such as Armstrong, Calloway, and Ellington.

Cotton Clubs in Las Vegas, Portland, Oregon, Lubbock, Texas, and Colorado Springs were all different locations of other Cotton Clubs. The Lubbock club was opened on November 11, 1938, by Tommy Hancock, and was an integrated club, not unlike the Chicago club. The club in Lubbock, however, was home to more white artists than the Harlem club. The Cotton Club in Portland was opened by Ralph Flowers and Lee Thompson in 1960. The club in Las Vegas was opened by Moe Taub in 1944. This location differed from other clubs because it was a casino. Taub opened the club to black servicemen.

== In popular culture ==
'I learned from Ethel Waters, Duke Ellington, Adelaide Hall, the Nicholas Brothers, the whole thing, the whole schmear. [The Cotton Club] was a great place because it hired us, for one thing, at a time when it was really rough [for Black performers].'

— Lena Horne

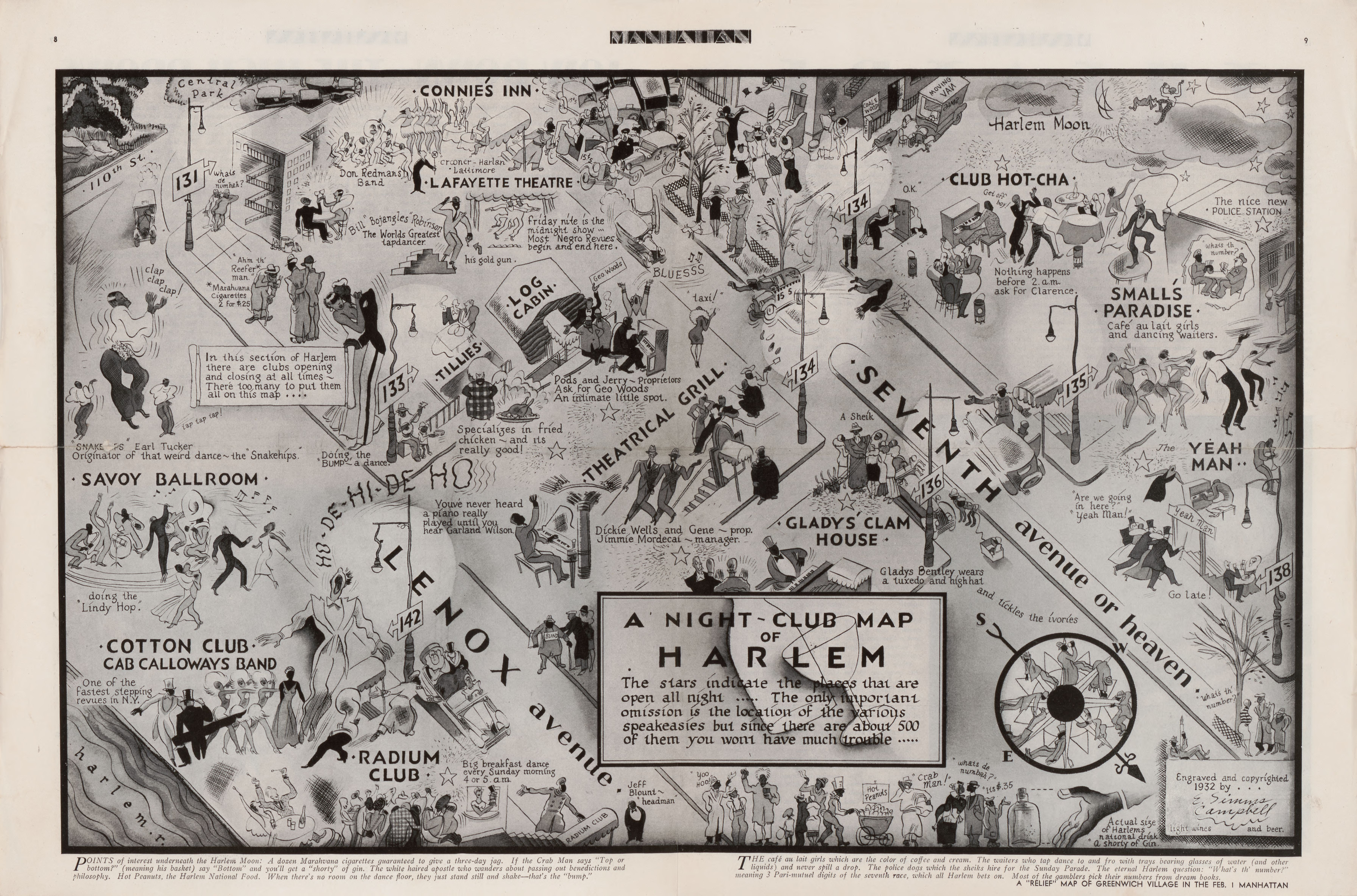
A 1933 map of nightclubs in Harlem, showing the Cotton Club and others such as the Savoy Ballroom and Smalls Paradise.

The Cotton Club Gala, which featured some of the club's original dancers, was produced at La MaMa Experimental Theatre Club twice in 1975 and again in 1985. The 1985 production was directed by La MaMa founder Ellen Stewart. La MaMa also toured Europe with the Cotton Club Gala in 1976.

The Cotton Club Comes to the Ritz (1985) starring Adelaide Hall, Cab Calloway, Doc Cheatham, The Nicholas Brothers etc. Produced by BBC TV.

In the 1988 film Who Framed Roger Rabbit, the fictional Ink and Paint Club is based on the Cotton Club.

After Midnight is a 2013 Broadway musical revue about the music created during Duke Ellington's years at the Cotton Club.

== See also ==
- Cotton Club Boys (chorus line)
- Black and tan clubs
