= It Can't Last Forever =

1937 film

- Directed by: Hamilton MacFadden
- Written by: Lee Loeb; Harold Buchman
- Produced by: Harry L. Decker
- Starring: Ralph Bellamy; Betty Furness; Robert Armstrong
- Cinematography: Allen G. Siegler
- Edited by: Gene Milford
- Music by: Morris Stoloff
- Production company: Columbia Pictures
- Distributed by: Columbia Pictures
- Release date: July 15, 1937
- Running time: 68 minutes
- Country: United States
- Language: English

It Can't Last Forever is a 1937 American comedy film directed by Hamilton MacFadden and starring Ralph Bellamy, Betty Furness, and Robert Armstrong. It is also the debut film for an unbilled 11-year-old Donald O'Connor, who would later go on to be famous for his acrobatic tap dancing.

== Cast ==
- Ralph Bellamy as Russ Matthews
- Betty Furness as Carol Wilson
- Robert Armstrong as Al Tinker
- Raymond Walburn as Dr. Fothergill
- Thurston Hall as Fulton
- Edward Pawley as Cronin
- Wade Boteler as Police Captain Rorty
- Charles Judels as Mr. Appadelius
- George Chesebro as Studs
- Marc Lawrence as Hoodlum
- unbilled players include Dorothy Dandridge, Paul Fix and Donald O'Connor

== Bibliography ==
- Etling, Laurence. Radio in the Movies: A History and Filmography, 1926-2010. McFarland & Company, 2014.
