= Theresa Harris =

American television and film actress, singer and dancer (1906–1985)

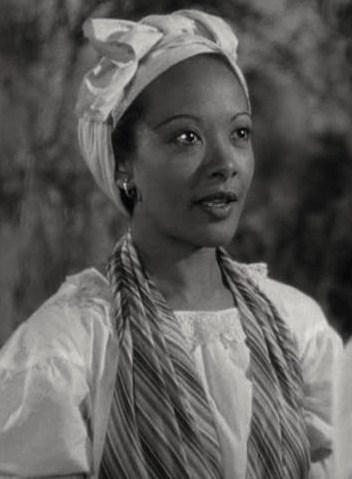
- Harris in I Walked with a Zombie (1943)
- Born: Theresa Mae Harris; December 31, 1906; Houston, Texas, U.S.
- Died: October 8, 1985 (aged 78); Inglewood, California, U.S.
- Resting place: Angelus-Rosedale Cemetery
- Education: USC Conservatory of Music; Zoellner's Conservatory of Music
- Occupations: Actress; singer; dancer
- Years active: 1929–1958
- Spouse: John Marshall Robinson Jr. (m. 1933; div. 1936)

Theresa Mae Harris (December 31, 1906 – October 8, 1985) was an American television and film actress, singer and dancer.

== Early life ==
Harris was born in Houston, Texas, one of five children born to Ina and Anthony Harris. Her mother was a "well-known elocutionist," and said to be the source of Theresa's "histrionic talent."

The Harris family relocated to Southern California in the early 1920s. After graduating from Jefferson High School, she studied at the USC Conservatory of Music and the Zoellner Conservatory of Music. She then joined the Lafayette Players, an African American musical comedy theatre troupe.

== Career ==
Harris made her film debut in 1929 in Thunderbolt, singing the song "Daddy Won't You Please Come Home". As she entered the 1930s, she played, often without credit, maids to characters acted by Ginger Rogers, Bette Davis, Sylvia Sidney, Frances Dee, Myrna Loy, Jean Harlow, Thelma Todd, Kay Francis, Mary Duncan, and, notably, Barbara Stanwyck. She also floated around studios doing bit-parts, usually at Warner Bros. or Metro-Goldwyn-Mayer, variously as a blues singer, waitress, tribal woman, prostitute, or hat check girl.

Harris had a featured role as a friend of star Jean Harlow in MGM's Hold Your Man (1933), co-starring Clark Gable. In 1933, she appeared as Chico in the Warner Bros. pre-Code production of Baby Face, starring Barbara Stanwyck. What is remarkable for the time about this film is that Chico and Lily (Stanwyck) are depicted as genuine friends and, before Lily's rise, almost complete equals. That same year, Harris starred in a substantial role opposite Ginger Rogers in Professional Sweetheart. As Rogers's character's maid, Harris subs for Rogers's character as a singer on the radio. Despite the fact that Harris's character was a major point for the story's plot development, she was uncredited for the role.

Throughout the 1930s, Harris played many uncredited parts in films such as Horse Feathers (1932), Gold Diggers of 1933 (1933), Mary Stevens, M.D. (1933) and Morning Glory (1933). She also played Bette Davis's maid Zette in the film Jezebel (1938). In 1937, she appeared in the race film Bargain with Bullets opposite Ralph Cooper for Million Dollar Productions, co-owned by Cooper. While doing promotion for the film, Harris spoke about her frustration over the difficulty African American actors faced in the film industry stating,

I never had the chance to rise above the role of maid in Hollywood movies. My color was against me anyway you looked at it. The fact that I was not "hot" stamped me either as uppity or relegated me to the eternal role of stooge or servant. [...] My ambition is to be an actress. Hollywood had no parts for me.

She also praised Ralph Cooper for starting a production company that produced films starring African American actors. She said,

We have nothing to lose in the development of an all-colored motion picture company. The competition will make Hollywood perk up and produce better films with our people in a variety of roles.

Harris continued to lobby for better parts within Hollywood but found few opportunities. In the 1939 movie Tell No Tales she was credited for playing Ruby, the wife of a murdered man. Harris played an emotional scene with Melvin Douglas at the funeral. She appears in a small but vivid role as Kathie Moffat's ex-maid Eunice Leonard in Jacques Tourneur's quintessential 1947 film noir, Out of the Past.

In addition to films, Harris also performed in many radio programs, including Hollywood Hotel. Harris was often paired with Eddie Rochester Anderson, who portrayed her on-screen boyfriend. They appeared together in Buck Benny Rides Again (1940), Love They Neighbor (1940) and What's Buzzin' Cousin (1943). In Buck Benny Rides Again, Harris and Anderson performed the musical number "My, My," where they sing and dance tap, classical, Spanish, and swing. She also appeared in several prominent roles for RKO Pictures as she was a favorite of producer Val Lewton who routinely cast African American actors in non-stereotypical roles. In 1942, Lewton cast Harris as a sarcastic waitress in Cat People, followed by roles in I Walked with a Zombie (1943), Phantom Lady (1944), and Strange Illusion (1945).

During the 1950s, Harris appeared several times on television on such shows as Lux Video Theatre, Alfred Hitchcock Presents, and Letter to Loretta. She made her last film appearance in an uncredited role in The Gift of Love in 1958.

== Personal life ==
Harris married John Marshall Robinson, a doctor, in 1933. Barely had news of their wedding been published when it was reported that Robinson had been arrested and charged with receiving stolen goods (paid for with morphine supplied to his drug-addicted benefactor). As of March 1934, Harris was still being described as "very much in love" with her husband, but by June of that year, Robinson was a convicted felon, and in 1936, amidst reports of wife-beating having entered the equation, she filed for divorce.

Harris retired from acting in the late 1950s, living comfortably off careful investments made during her career.

== Death ==
Harris died of undisclosed causes in Inglewood, California, on October 8, 1985. She was buried in Angelus-Rosedale Cemetery in Los Angeles, California.

== Legacy ==
The title character in Lynn Nottage's 2011 play By the Way, Meet Vera Stark is based in part on Theresa Harris.

== Selected filmography ==
- Thunderbolt (1929) as Black Cat Cafe Singer (uncredited)
- Morocco (1930) as Camp Follower (uncredited)
- The Road to Reno (1931) as Maid at Dude Ranch (uncredited)
- Arrowsmith (1931) as Native Mother (uncredited)
- Union Depot (1932) as Black Woman (uncredited)
- Merrily We Go to Hell (1932) as Powder Room Attendant (uncredited)
- Week Ends Only (1932) as Chloë (uncredited)
- Horse Feathers (1932) as Laura, Connie's maid (uncredited)
- Free Wheeling (1932, Short) as Maid
- Faithless (1932) as Amanda (uncredited)
- Night After Night (1932) as Ladies' Room Attendant (uncredited)
- The Sport Parade (1932) as Nightclub Dancer (uncredited)
- The Half-Naked Truth (1932) as Emily, Teresita's Maid (uncredited)
- Grand Slam (1933) as Ladies' Room Attendant (uncredited)
- Gold Diggers of 1933 (1933) as Black Woman in 'Pettin' in the Park' Number (uncredited)
- Professional Sweetheart (1933) as Vera, Glory's Maid (uncredited)
- Private Detective 62 (1933) as Janet's Maid (uncredited)
- Hold Your Man (1933) as Lily Mae Crippen, reformatory inmate (uncredited)
- Baby Face (1933) as Chico
- Mary Stevens, M.D. (1933) as Alice, Andrews' Maid (uncredited)
- Morning Glory (1933) as Minor Role (uncredited)
- Penthouse (1933) as Lili, Mimi's Maid (uncredited)
- Broadway Through a Keyhole (1933) as Joan's Maid (uncredited)
- Blood Money (1933) as Jessica (uncredited)
- The Worst Woman in Paris? (1933) as Lily, the Maid
- Roman Scandals (1933) as Handmaiden (uncredited)
- Flying Down to Rio (1933) as Dancer (uncredited)
- Success at Any Price (1934) as Marie, Agnes' Maid (uncredited)
- A Modern Hero (1934) as Leah's Maid (uncredited)
- Sleepers East (1934) as Gloria Washington (uncredited)
- Finishing School (1934) as Evelyn, Mrs Radcliff's maid (uncredited)
- Drums O' Voodoo (1934)
- Operator 13 (1934) as Slave at Medicine Show (uncredited)
- Black Moon (1934) as Sacrificed Girl (uncredited)
- Desirable (1934) as Ladies Room Maid at Party (uncredited)
- Go Into Your Dance (1935) as Luana's Maid (uncredited)
- Broadway Melody of 1936 (1935) as Theresa (uncredited)
- In Person (1935) as Carol's Maid (uncredited)
- Strike Me Pink (1936) as Dancer / Singer in 'First You Have Me High (Then You Have Me Low)' (uncredited)
- The Green Pastures (1936) as Angel (uncredited)
- 15 Maiden Lane (1936) as Ladies Room Maid (uncredited)
- Banjo On My Knee (1936) as Black Blues Singer (uncredited)
- Charlie Chan at the Olympics (1937) as Black US Team Member On Sidelines Rooting for Jesse Owens (uncredited)
- The Lady Escapes (1937) as Maid (uncredited)
- Big Town Girl (1937) as Maid (uncredited)
- Gangsters on the Loose (1937) as Grace Foster
- Jezebel (1938) as Zette
- The Toy Wife (1938) as 'Pick'
- Passport Husband (1938) as Maid (uncredited)
- Tell No Tales (1939) as Ruby
- The Women (1939) as Olive (uncredited)
- One Hour to Live (1939) as High Yaller girl
- City of Chance (1940) as Beulah, Powder Room Attendant (uncredited)
- Buck Benny Rides Again (1940) as Josephine
- Santa Fe Trail (1940) as Maid (uncredited)
- Love Thy Neighbor (1940) as Josephine
- The Flame of New Orleans (1941) as Clementine
- Blossoms in the Dust (1941) as Cleo
- Our Wife (1941) as Hattie
- Here Comes Mr. Jordan (1941) as Mother Listening to Hurdy-gurdy (uncredited)
- Sing Your Worries Away (1942) as Hat Check Girl (uncredited)
- Tough as They Come (1942) as Bessie Mae
- Cat People (1942) as Minnie (uncredited)
- I Walked with a Zombie (1943) as Alma, Maid
- What's Buzzin', Cousin? (1943) as Blossom (uncredited)
- Phantom Lady (1944)
- Strange Illusion (1945) as Maid (uncredited)
- Men in Her Diary (1945) as Violet (uncredited)
- The Dolly Sisters (1945) as Ellabelle (uncredited)
- Miss Susie Slagle's (1946) as Maid (uncredited)
- Smooth as Silk (1946) as Louise
- Three Little Girls in Blue (1946) as Maid (uncredited)
- Swingtime Jamboree (1946)
- Hit Parade of 1947 (1947) as Maid (uncredited)
- Miracle on 34th Street (1947) as Cleo, the Walkers' maid / housekeeper (uncredited)
- Merton of the Movies (1947) as Beulah's Maid (uncredited)
- Out of the Past (1947) as Eunice Leonard (uncredited)
- The Lady from Shanghai (1947) as Spectator in Courtroom (uncredited)
- The Big Clock (1948) as Daisy, Strouds' Maid (uncredited)
- The Velvet Touch (1948) as Nancy
- Alias Nick Beal (1949) as Opal, Donna's Maid (uncredited)
- Neptune's Daughter (1949) as Matilda the Maid (uncredited)
- Tension (1949) as Woman in Drugstore (uncredited)
- And Baby Makes Three (1949) as Wanda's Maid (uncredited)
- The File on Thelma Jordon (1950) as Esther
- Grounds for Marriage (1951) as Stella
- Al Jennings of Oklahoma (1951) as Terese
- The Company She Keeps (1951) as Lilly Johnson (uncredited)
- Angel Face (1953) as Nurse Theresa (uncredited)
- Small Town Girl (1953) as Backstage Maid (uncredited)
- Here Come the Girls (1953) as Josie, Irene's Maid (uncredited)
- The French Line (1953) as Clara, Mame's Maid (uncredited)
- Alfred Hitchcock Presents (1956) (Season 1 Episode 23: "Back for Christmas") as California Maid
- Back from Eternity (1956) as Mamie (uncredited)
- Spoilers of the Forest (1957) as Nancy the Maid (uncredited)
- The Gift of Love (1958) as Dora, Sam's Wife (uncredited) (final film role)
