= Clinton Rosemond =

American actor

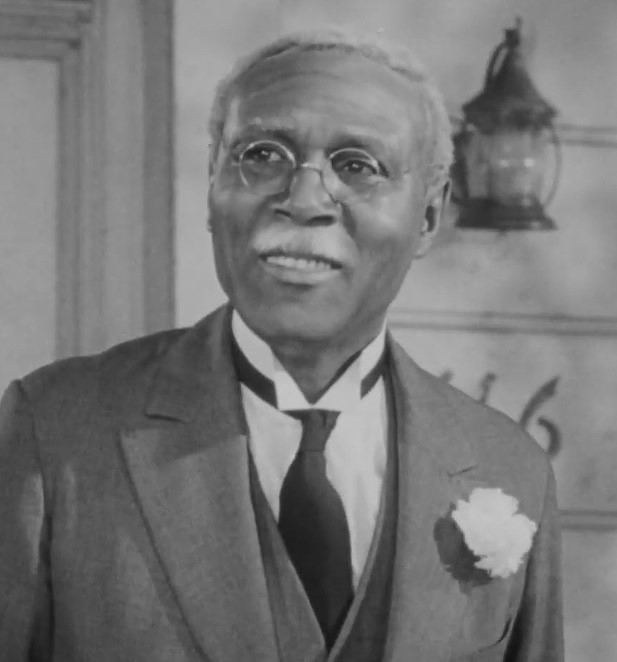
- Born: November 1, 1882; Seneca City, South Carolina, USA
- Died: March 10, 1966 (aged 83); Sawtelle, Los Angeles, California, USA
- Occupation: Actor
- Years active: 1930–1953

Clinton Rosemond (November 1, 1882 – March 10, 1966) was an American singer and actor. Born Cresent Clinton Rosemond, he served as a private in the United States Army during the Spanish–American War, and he later sang in the Southern Trio with John C. Payne and Mabel Mercer in the 1920s. The group was based in England and specialized in a cappella. Rosemond went on to act in American films of the 1930s and 1940s.

Often uncredited and typecast as a butler or servant due to a lack of film roles for African-American actors, he was frequently relegated to playing demeaning parts, such as a stereotypical "scared Negro". Rosemond died in 1966 from a stroke.

He and his wife Corinne had two daughters, Eleanor Alsobrooks, an educator, and Bertha Hope-Booker, a musician, and a son Clinton, a city planner.

== Partial filmography ==
- Only the Brave (1930) - The Butler (uncredited)
- The Mask of Fu Manchu (1932) - Slave (uncredited)
- No Man of Her Own (1932) - Porter (uncredited)
- Carolina (1934) - Singer, along with Beulah Hall (uncredited)
- Hearts in Bondage (1936) - Jordan's Servant (uncredited)
- The Green Pastures (1936) - Prophet
- Dark Manhattan (1937) - Ben Jones (uncredited)
- They Won't Forget (1937) - Tump Redwine
- Hollywood Hotel (1937) - Colored Man
- Accidents Will Happen (1938) - Man Getting Arm Broken (uncredited)
- The Toy Wife (1938) - Pompey
- Young Dr. Kildare (1938) - Conover (uncredited)
- Stand up and Fight (1939) - Enoch
- Calling Dr. Kildare (1939) - Conover
- Golden Boy (1939) - Chocolate Drop's Father (uncredited)
- Midnight Shadow (1939) - Mr. Dan Wilson
- Dark Command (1940) - Tom - McClouds' Servant (uncredited)
- Safari (1940) - Mike
- Maryland (1940) - Brother Dickey (uncredited)
- Santa Fe Trail (1940) - Black Man on Train (uncredited)
- Blossoms in the Dust (1941) - Zeke
- Belle Starr (1941) - Black Man on Bench (uncredited)
- Badlands of Dakota (1941) - Grayson's Butler (uncredited)
- The Vanishing Virginian (1942) - Black Minister (uncredited)
- Syncopation (1942) - Professor Topeka (uncredited)
- Yankee Doodle Dandy (1942) - White House Butler (uncredited)
- Are Husbands Necessary? (1942) - Enos
- Cabin in the Sky (1943) - Doctor (uncredited)
- I Walked with a Zombie (1943) - Coachman (uncredited)
- I Dood It (1943) - Actor in Play as Uncle Sig (uncredited)
- Is Everybody Happy? (1943) - Doorman (uncredited)
- Flesh and Fantasy (1943) - Elderly Man (uncredited)
- Heavenly Days (1944) - Servant (uncredited)
- Jungle Queen (1944, Serial) - Godac
- Voice of the Whistler (1945) - Train Porter (uncredited)
- Colonel Effingham's Raid (1946) - Servant (uncredited)
- Three Little Girls in Blue (1946) - Ben (uncredited)
- The Secret Heart (1946) - William (uncredited)
- The Homestretch (1947) - Black Man (uncredited)
- Sport of Kings (1947) - Josiah
- The Burning Cross (1947) - Grandpa West
- The Story of Seabiscuit (1949) - Swipe (uncredited)
- Tonight We Sing (1953) - Father (uncredited) (final film role)
- I Am Not Your Negro (2016) - clip of his role as Tump Redwine in "They Won't Forget".
