= Michael Luciano =

American film editor

- Born: Michael A. Luciano; May 2, 1909; McAdoo, Pennsylvania, US
- Died: September 15, 1992 (aged 83); Los Angeles, California, US
- Occupations: Film and television editor

Michael Luciano (May 2, 1909 – September 15, 1992) was an American film and television editor with about forty feature film credits and many additional credits for television programs. From 1954 to 1977, Luciano edited 20 (nearly all) of the films directed, and often produced, by Robert Aldrich. Aldrich was a prolific and independent maker of popular films "who depicted corruption and evil unflinchingly, and pushed limits on violence throughout his career." Their early collaboration, the film noir Kiss Me Deadly (1955), was entered into the US National Film Registry in 1999; the unusual editing of the film has been noted by several critics. Luciano's work with Aldrich was recognized by four Academy Award nominations, for Hush...Hush, Sweet Charlotte (1964), The Flight of the Phoenix (1965), The Dirty Dozen (1967), and The Longest Yard (1974).

== Early career ==
Nothing appears to have been published about Luciano's early career and education. In the era of the Hollywood studio system and the "Big Five" studios, Luciano's credits are for films produced by smaller companies. His first credit is as the editor of The Luck of Roaring Camp, a 1937 film produced by Monogram Pictures, which was a "Poverty Row" studio. He edited Gang War (1940), which was produced by Million Dollar Productions. His last credit before the US entry into World War II was apparently for Meet the Chump (1941).

Luciano's first postwar credit was for The Return of Rin Tin Tin (1947), which was the 41st feature film that starred the German shepherd dog Rin Tin Tin and his successors. Also in 1947, Luciano was the assistant to editors Robert Parrish and Francis D. Lyon on the boxing film Body and Soul, which was directed by Robert Rossen. The film won the Academy Award for Best Film Editing. Luciano worked for Parrish again as the "montage editor" on the 1949 film, Caught, and then co-edited the 1951 documentary Of Men and Music with Parrish and two others. Parrish subsequently moved into directing, and Luciano was the editor for Parrish's 1959 western, The Wonderful Country.

== The Aldrich collaboration ==
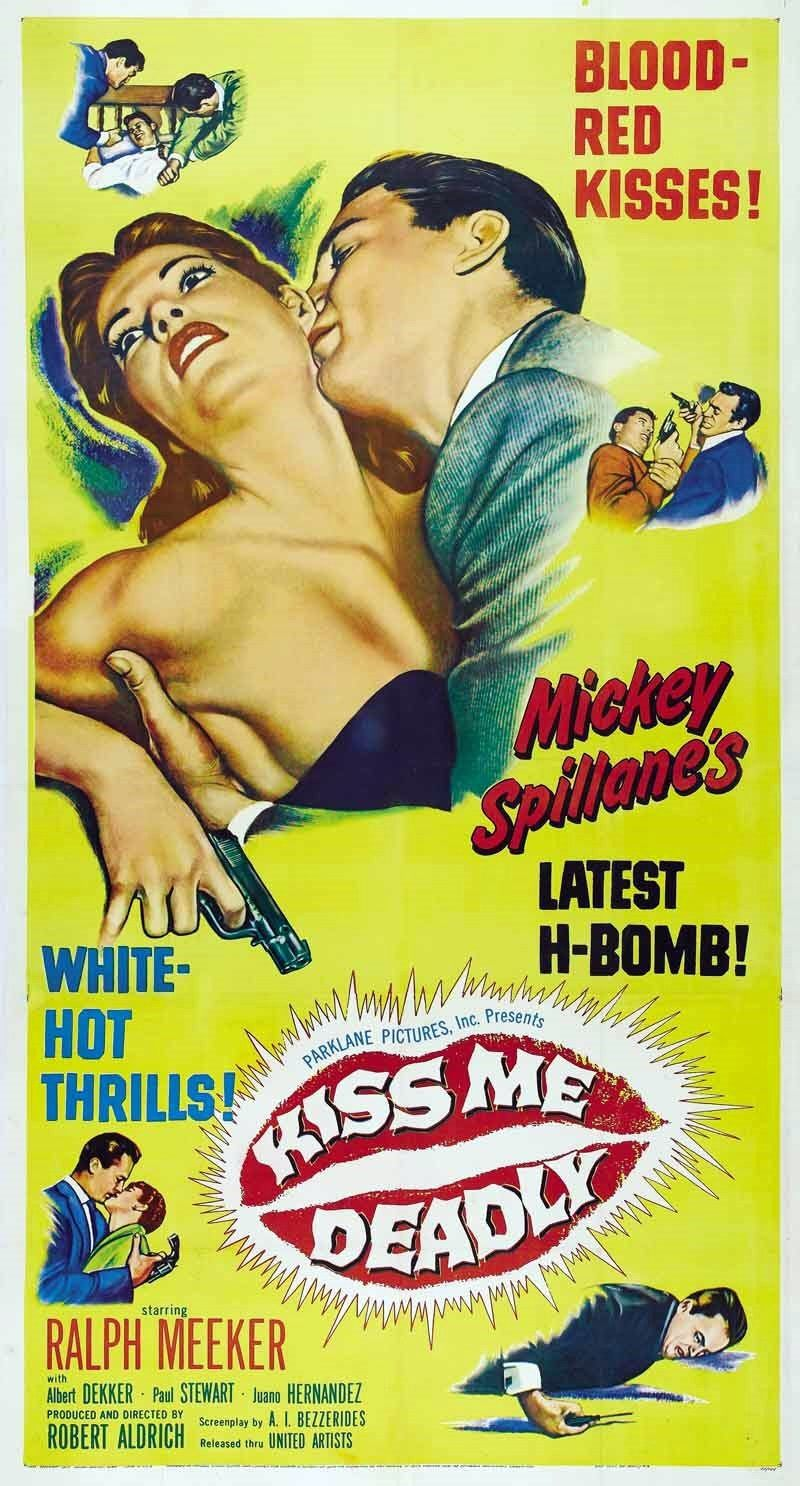
Theatrical release poster for Kiss Me Deadly (1955)

Robert Aldrich was an assistant director on Body and Soul, Chase, and Of Men and Music. He asked Luciano to edit the 1954 film World for Ransom, which was the first film he produced and directed. Joseph F. Biroc was the cinematographer, and Frank De Vol composed the music. Luciano, Biroc, and De Vol became Aldrich's "informal repertory company" for the next two decades. In 1955 Luciano edited Aldrich's Kiss Me Deadly, which is an important film noir that is now in the National Film Registry. Luciano edited almost all of Aldrich's films that followed Kiss Me Deadly, including three in the following year.

Aldrich enjoyed particular success with the 1962 film What Ever Happened to Baby Jane? and its offspring Hush...Hush, Sweet Charlotte (1964). The latter film won Luciano his first major recognition with a nomination for the Academy Award for Best Film Editing, which was just one of the seven "Oscar" nominations for the film. The following year, Luciano's editing of The Flight of the Phoenix was nominated both for the Oscar and for the Eddie Award of the American Cinema Editors. The film that was Aldrich's greatest commercial success was The Dirty Dozen (1967), which had the fifth largest US ticket sales in 1967. Luciano won the Eddie award for the picture, and was again nominated for the Oscar. The Longest Yard (1974), again directed by Aldrich, garnered Luciano his second Eddie Award and a fourth Oscar nomination.

The final film of the long Aldrich-Luciano collaboration was Twilight's Last Gleaming (1977). For about 23 years, Luciano had been a member of Aldrich's "informal repertory company", which also included cinematographer Joseph F. Biroc and composer Frank De Vol. Ben Sachs has written of Aldrich's motivations in maintaining a core group of collaborators over more than two decades. He notes that Aldrich admired the studio system, which could keep teams of filmmakers together for decades. Aldrich's career saw the collapse of that system, but "Aldrich sought to preserve the team of collaborators — which included cinematographer Joseph Biroc, composer Frank De Vol, editor Michael Luciano, and production designer William Glasgow — with whom he'd regularly worked since his second feature, World for Ransom (1954). ... In interviews he presented himself as an organizer of creative talents who encouraged his casts and crews to help shape the material at hand."

== Other works ==
Luciano edited several more features before his retirement around 1982, including Stripes (1981), which was directed by Ivan Reitman. In addition to his editing of feature films with Aldrich and other directors, Luciano was a prolific editor of television programs in the 1950s and 1960s, with credits for episodes of Gunsmoke, Have Gun – Will Travel, The Donna Reed Show, and other series. In 1956, Luciano edited one episode of Gunsmoke that was directed by Charles Marquis Warren, and over the next two years Luciano edited three feature films directed by Warren. Luciano was nominated for an Eddie for a 1964 episode of the television program Bewitched. Luciano's last film project was Kidnapped (1987), for which he is credited as a supervising editor and an associate producer.

== Luciano's legacy ==
Luciano's editing has been noted in several books and articles. In his book Film Noir, William Luhr notes the editing of Kiss Me Deadly as part of the film's "disorienting, even disturbing, formal strategies." J.P. Telotte writes that, "one of the pillars of classical narrative, continuity editing, often disappears - or to be more precise, repeatedly fails, as in a later work like Breathless, so that we see the seams in the narrative, the manipulations in our point of view, the mismatched fragments of the story constructed for us."

In their 2002 text, Robert Goodman and Patrick McGrath recommend study of Luciano's editing of The Dirty Dozen and The Longest Yard. In his study of films with sports themes, Randy Williams discusses the influence of The Longest Yard (1974): "Aldrich uses split-screen and slow motion techniques to help convey the tension and drama as the game progresses. The real key is the pinpoint timing of Michael Luciano's editing...The Longest Yard is still one of the more influential movies in sports cinema."

Glenn Erickson has discussed the split-screen editing of Twilight's Last Gleaming, which was Luciano's final film with Aldrich, "In this show Aldrich and Luciano make effective use of split screens to show multiple parallel actions simultaneously. Actions that play out in real time seem more immediate, when we see all the information all at once: a pair of commandos set a nuclear device on one side of a steel door, while on the other side General Dell and his fellow gunmen begin to guess that just such a commando sneak attack might be taking place." Ben Sachs notes that the clearly visible editing that characterized Kiss Me Deadly was toned down in later films by Aldrich and Luciano, "Intriguingly, Aldrich's style grew more modest as his content grew more provocative. Where his 1950s and 1960s work teems with hopped-up editing and Wellesian camera angles, his later films are comparatively straightforward...The filmmaking privileges content over style, pushing to the foreground the contradictions inherent in the material."

Luciano had been selected as a member of the American Cinema Editors.

== Selected filmography ==
Editor
Year	Film	Director	Notes	Other notes
1937	Luck of Roaring Camp	Irvin Willat		
1938	Man's Country	Robert F. Hill		
1939	The Adventures of the Masked Phantom	Charles Abbott		Uncredited
1940	Gang War	Leo C. Popkin		
1947	The Return of Rin Tin Tin	Max Nosseck		
1951	Stop That Cab	Eugenio de Liguoro		
1954	World for Ransom	Robert Aldrich	First collaboration with Robert Aldrich	
1955	Kiss Me Deadly	Robert Aldrich	Second collaboration with Robert Aldrich	
1955	The Big Knife	Robert Aldrich	Third collaboration with Robert Aldrich	
1956	Autumn Leaves	Robert Aldrich	Fourth collaboration with Robert Aldrich	
1956	Attack	Robert Aldrich	Fifth collaboration with Robert Aldrich	
1957	The Halliday Brand	Joseph H. Lewis		
1957	The Ride Back	Allen H. Miner		
1957	The Unknown Terror	Charles Marquis Warren	First collaboration with Charles Marquis Warren	
1957	Copper Sky	Charles Marquis Warren	Second collaboration with Charles Marquis Warren	
1958	Blood Arrow	Charles Marquis Warren	Third collaboration with Charles Marquis Warren	
1959	The Wonderful Country	Robert Parrish		
1961	Atlas	Roger Corman		
1961	The Last Sunset	Robert Aldrich	Sixth collaboration with Robert Aldrich	
1962	What Ever Happened to Baby Jane?	Robert Aldrich	Seventh collaboration with Robert Aldrich	
1963	Black Zoo	Robert Gordon		
1963	4 for Texas	Robert Aldrich	Eighth collaboration with Robert Aldrich	
1964	Hush...Hush, Sweet Charlotte	Robert Aldrich	Ninth collaboration with Robert Aldrich	
1965	The Flight of the Phoenix	Robert Aldrich	Tenth collaboration with Robert Aldrich	
1967	The Dirty Dozen	Robert Aldrich	Eleventh collaboration with Robert Aldrich	
1968	The Legend of Lylah Clare	Robert Aldrich	Twelfth collaboration with Robert Aldrich	
1968	The Killing of Sister George	Robert Aldrich	Thirteenth collaboration with Robert Aldrich	
1970	Too Late the Hero	Robert Aldrich	Fourteenth collaboration with Robert Aldrich	
1971	The Grissom Gang	Robert Aldrich	Fifteenth collaboration with Robert Aldrich	
1972	Trap on Cougar Mountain	Keith Larsen	First collaboration with Keith Larsen	
1972	Ulzana's Raid	Robert Aldrich	Sixteenth collaboration with Robert Aldrich	
1973	Emperor of the North Pole	Robert Aldrich	Seventeenth collaboration with Robert Aldrich	
1974	The Longest Yard	Robert Aldrich	Eighteenth collaboration with Robert Aldrich	
1975	Hustle	Robert Aldrich	Nineteenth collaboration with Robert Aldrich	
1976	Bobbie Jo and the Outlaw	Mark L. Lester		
1976	Scorchy	Howard Avedis	First collaboration with Howard Avedis	Uncredited
1977	Twilight's Last Gleaming	Robert Aldrich	Twentieth collaboration with Robert Aldrich	
1977	Empire of the Ants	Bert I. Gordon		
1978	The One Man Jury	Charles Martin		
1979	Young and Free	Keith Larsen	Second collaboration with Keith Larsen	
1980	Hardly Working	Jerry Lewis		
1981	Stripes	Ivan Reitman		

Editorial department
Year	Film	Director	Role	Notes
1947	Body and Soul	Robert Rossen	Assistant editor	Uncredited
1949	Caught	Max Ophüls	Montages	
1969	What Ever Happened to Aunt Alice?	Lee H. Katzin	Supervising editor	
1981	Taps	Harold Becker	Additional editor	
1987	Kidnapped	Howard Avedis	Supervising editor	Second collaboration with Howard Avedis

Producer
Year	Film	Director	Credit
1987	Kidnapped	Howard Avedis	Associate producer

Documentaries

Editor
Year	Film	Director
1951	Of Men and Music	Alexander Hammid; Irving Reis

TV documentaries

Editor
Year	Film	Director
1981	High Hopes: The Capra Years	—N/a

TV movies

Editor
Year	Film	Director
1979	Gold of the Amazon Women	Mark L. Lester
1982	American Eagle	William A. Graham

TV series

Editor
Year	Title	Notes
1952	Invitation Playhouse: Mind Over Murder	7 episodes
1953	Craig Kennedy, Criminologist	3 episodes
1956−57	Gunsmoke	6 episodes
1957−58	Have Gun – Will Travel	10 episodes
1957−58	Playhouse 90	2 episodes
1958	The Donna Reed Show	12 episodes
1959	The Alaskans	1 episode
1960	Bronco	1 episode
1960	Lawman	1 episode
1960	77 Sunset Strip	1 episode
1959−60	Bourbon Street Beat	4 episodes
1961	Outlaws	1 episode
1964	Bewitched	1 episode
1966−67	The Man Who Never Was	1 episode
1973	Bob & Carol & Ted & Alice	2 episodes
1985	Otherworld	1 episode

Editorial department
Year	Title	Role	Notes
1953	The Dennis Day Show	Editorial supervisor	1 episode

== See also ==
- List of film director and editor collaborations
