= Bargain with Bullets =

1937 American film

Bargain with Bullets is a 1937 American film. The first film produced by Million Dollar Productions, it features an African American cast of actors and performers. The gangster film is about the Harlem underworld. It was described as the first Hollywood "all-Negro" film. The film features several musical performances.

Toddy Pictures Company acquired Million Dollar Productions and re-released the film as Gangsters on the Loose.

The gangster themed film drew scrutiny from film censorship boards in the U.S. requiring extensive editing of the film.

== Cast ==
- Ralph Cooper as Mugsy "Killer" Moore
- Theresa Harris
- Frances Turham
- Lawrence Criner
- Clarence Brooks

== See also ==
- Dark Manhattan
