= William Nolte =

American film director

William Lewis Nolte (1889–1965) was a screenwriter and film director in the United States. He directed the musical film The Duke Is Tops released by Million Dollar Productions. It was re-released in 1943 under the title The Bronze Venus. He is credited as a production manager for the 1942 film Thunder River Feud and as a line producer on the 1947 film Shadow Valley. From 1949 until at least 1957 he was an assistant director on several films.

He was co-writer for the 1951 television show Buckskin Rangers.

== Selected filmography ==
- Romance Revier (1934), assistant director
- West on Parade (1934), assistant director
- Gun Play (1935)
- Wolf Riders (1935), assistant director
- The Duke Is Tops (1938), director
- Life Goes On (1938), director. Reissued in 1944 as His Harlem Wife
- Take My Life (1942), production manager
- Saddle Mountain Roundup (1941), original story
- Square Dance Jubilee (1949), author
