= Class Act (disambiguation) =

Class Act or Class act may refer to:

== Language ==
- Class act (performance), a noun phrase that lauds an admirable person, team, or organization

== Media ==
=== Movies ===
- Class Act, a 1992 comedy film.

=== TV Series ===
- Class Act (British TV series), a 1994–1995 British comedy drama
- Class Act (Irish TV series), a 2007–2008 Irish talent show
- Class Act (French TV series), a 2023 French miniseries, called Tapie in French.
- Tracey Ullman: A Class Act, a TV special that debuted in 1993, starring actress-comedian Tracey Ullman

=== Graphic novels ===
- Asterix and the Class Act, the thirty-second album of the French-language Asterix comic book series
- P5 (comics) AKA Class Act, a comic strip in The Dandy
- Class Act, a graphic novel by Jerry Craft

=== Stage ===
- A Class Act, a musical by Edward Kleban that debuted in 2000

== Other ==
- Community Living Assistance Services and Supports Act AKA CLASS Act, an American federal law
