= Class act (performance) =

High-quality show

A class act is a performance, personal trait or behavior that is distinctive and of high quality. As a noun phrase, it is typically used to refer to a single person, a team (such as performing artists working together) or an organization.

== Usage and contemporary etymology ==
=== In sports ===
In sports, a "class act" would be an athlete who not only performs exceptionally well, but also exhibits a range of other admirable qualities on and off the field.

=== In dance ===
In dance during the Jazz Age and the swing era (the first half of the 20th century) – tap dance in particular – a class act was, and still is, a complimentary reference to a dance team that exhibits precision, elegant dress, detached coolness, flawless execution, and dignity. In 1946, after serving in the Army, Charles "Honi" Coles and Cholly Atkins collaborated as a dance duo that became highly acclaimed. British dance critic Edward Thorpe, in his 1989 book, Black Dance, described Coles and Atkins as ...

the ultimate example of what other protagonists of American vernacular dance call "a class act," and there can be no higher praise than that.

For black dancers of the Jazz Age and the swing era, the noun phrase, "class act," had a more nuanced meaning. According to Cholly Atkins, some performers and managers harbored stereotypical preferences of how black male dancers and musical comedy dance teams should dress and perform. To those performers and managers, a class act was more apropos for white male entertainers. Black entertainers who did it were likely to be perceived as defiant. Atkins, in his 2001 book, Class Act (co-authored with Jacqui Malone), stated that,

If they [white dancers] were singers or comics, they didn't like the fact that we were also doing those things as part of our act.

— Cholly Atkins (2001)

Against the backdrop of dance teams working in the blackface tradition, Atkins was one in a long list of black male dance artists who rejected the minstrel show stereotypes. Atkins and his peers were known for artistic expression, driven by a desire for respectability and equality on the American concert stage.

==== Class act syles, in tap ====
Marshall Stearns, in the 1964 television film, Over the Top to Bebop, stated that the class act "started with the soft-shoe and the sand and the shuffle; and it grew up and became a dance in which you showed elegance and dignity and precision. And every class act in the thirties and forties had their own soft-shoe."

== Selected "class acts" ==
=== In tap dance ===
- The Cotton Club Boys, from 1934 to 1940, were the Cotton Club's stock class act dance troupe
- John "Bubbles" Sublett and Ford "Buck" Washington
- Cholly Atkins and Honi Coles
- Willie Covan and Leonard Ruffin
- Eddie Sledge and Fred Davis (aka Fred and Sledge)
- Charles Cook and Ernest Brown
- Eddie Rector (1890–1962)
- Dickie Wells, Jimmy Mordecai, Earnest Taylor
- Nicholas brothers
- Gary Lambert "Pete" Nugent (1909–1973), Irving "Peaches" Beamon (born 1911), Duke Miller (1910–1937)

=== In vaudeville ===
- Rosamond Johnson and Bob Cole, vaudeville duo that began in 1902

== Contrasting noun phrase ==
A "flash act," in tap dance, includes acrobatic movements. The Nicholas brothers, who famously performed class acts, also did flash acts.
