= No Man of Her Own =

No Man of Her Own may refer to:

- No Man of Her Own (1950 film), an American film noir drama
- No Man of Her Own (1932 film), an American pre-Code romantic comedy-drama film
