= Eddie Rector =

American tap dancer (1890–1963)

Eddie Rector (December 25, 1890 – January 7, 1963) was an American tap dance artist and master of ceremonies. His career spanned the 1920s-40s as he danced in Harlem, across the US, and in Europe. He is known as a "soft shoe expert", and he invented the Slap Step. Rector was the protégé of John Leubrie Hill and later danced as a team with Ralph Cooper. He danced in notable revues, including Darktown Follies (1914), Tan Town Topics (1926), Blackbirds of 1928, Hot Rhythm (1930), Rhapsody in Black (1931), Blackberries of 1932, and Yeah Man (1932).

== Career ==
Rector was born on Christmas day in 1890 in Orange, New Jersey. According to Constance Vallis Hill's biography on the Library of Congress Tap Dancing America database, Rector started at age 15 in Mayme Remington's Vaudeville troupe. His first job in the theater was as a pickaninny. Shortly thereafter, in 1913, he got the part of 'Red Cap Sam' in a musical revue called the Darktown Follies. After finishing his run with the follies, he began touring with his partner Toots Davis in the T.O.B.A. Circuit. He partnered with Toots Davis, dancing “over the tops and in the trenches,” a particular dynamic step juxtaposing upright jumping over the legs, with bending at the waist almost touching the floor and sliding the feet back. It was during this period that he met his wife, Grace.

In the 1920s, he and his wife began to tour the Vaudeville circuits along with their new partner Ralph Cooper. The Rector-Cooper act played at Connie's Inn. It was at New York's Connie's Inn that he developed his own military precision drill-routine to the tune of The Parade of the Tin Soldiers. The routine allowed him to move around the entire stage, breaking from the sedentary style that was usually seen in tap of that time. As he became a regular Cotton Club performer, he developed his own style of dance, particular incorporating the use of big drums.

The Rector-Cooper act was especially featured at the Lafayette Theatre. They were considered a draw, and often danced to standing room only. Their dancing was described as “clever” and “defying description,” as having “inimitable style that few dancing teams of today can equal,” and of being “one of the snappiest dance teams in the country,” and of being so hot, that their dancing “burnt ‘em up.” Numerous sources describe Rector and Cooper as a “class act,” and they were known for their sharp dressing styles as much as their sharp tapping skills. As described in the Baltimore Afro-American, “their raccoon coats were the talk of the fashion-conscious.”

Eddie Rector performed with some of the biggest names in the business. He performed with Duke Ellington at the Ziegfeld Theatre in 1922 with Fats Waller in Tan Town Topics in 1926, and alongside Ethel Waters in 1925. Rector danced in “Dixie to Broadway” in 1924 alongside Florence Mills and Willie Covan. In 1942, Rector and Cooper headlined the Murrain's Lounge and Cabaret Show with Christopher Columbus and his orchestra. In 1945, Eddie Rector danced in the Atlantic City Follies with Peg Leg Bates.

In 1928, Eddie got a job performing in the international tour of Blackbirds of 1928, replacing Bill Robinson. After the tour, he returned to the United States and began dancing with Duke Ellington at the Cotton Club.

Hot Rhythm (1930) received scathing reviews from the critics, but Eddie Rector's dancing described as “the best,” “one of the best dancers on the boards,” and “unquestionably the peak attraction of the show. 1932's Yeah Man was similarly panned, excepting the dancing of Eddie Rector. As the Baltimore Afro-American stated, “its only redeeming feature is the dancing. Eddie Rector sets a high standard, while Roy and Rastus, the Stepping Quintette and three acts of Lindy Hoppers work hard to maintain.” In 1957 Dar Burley listed Rector as #7 in the 12 greatest tap dancers of all time, after Bill Bojangles Robinson, John Bubbles, Teddy Hale, Derby Wilson, Bill Bailey, Baby Lawrence, and Honi Coles.

== Blackbirds controversy ==
Eddie Rector replaced the noted tap dancer Bill 'Bojangles' Robinson in the musical Blackbirds when it toured in Paris. Rector had, in his repertoire, a stair dance similar to Bojangle's famed stair dance. For Blackbirds in Paris, Rector recreated the exact stair dance Bojangles performed in the original show. Bill Bojangles Robinson threatened to sue the producer of Blackbirds, Lew Leslie. Stating that he declined to give Leslie permission to use the dance abroad, Robinson sent the producer two cables cussing him out.

While the Blackbirds controversy circled around Rector's rendition of Bill 'Bojangles' Robinson's original stair dance, it does not appear that Robinson held it against Rector. In an interview in 1931, Robinson described Eddie Rector as the “best straight tap dancer” he knew.

== Personal life ==
Eddie Rector came from a family of performers. His sister, Julia, was a noted singer and his brother also danced For a time, he performed with his wife, Grace.

Eddie Rector suffered from depression and alcoholism. In 1934, he was booked for performances at the Lafayette Theatre with an option to continue. On February 19, 1934, Rector was arrested in the office of manager Frank Schiffman of the Lafayette Theater for carrying a loaded gun. Schiffman reportedly called the police concerned because Rector had suffered a previous mental health issues and was advised to take a week off. Other performers came to the Theatre to deescalate the situation including Bill Bojangles Robinson. Eddie Rector was sent to Bellevue Hospital for observation after being charged with violation of the Sullivan Law.

After his release he tried to team back up with Ralph Cooper, but the shows were not received well by the newer and younger audiences. In 1952, Flournoy Miller convinced Rector to return to the Broadway stages for one last performance. Rector was asked to do the sand dance in the 1952 and last revival of Shuffle Along. Even though the revival only lasted for a week, audiences and critics loved his performance and concluded that his sand dance "was the only number that roused the audience."

While his former partner, Ralph Cooper, went on to Hollywood fame, Eddie Rector sadly continued to suffer from mental health issues and substance abuse. In the latter years of Rector's life, he became a night watchman in New York City in 1962.

Rector died in 1963 at the reported age of 66.

== Legacy ==
To this day, dancers recognize the impact of Eddie Rector's artistry. Rector influenced the styles of a great many dancers of his time as hoofers sought to ‘steal steps’ from him and incorporate his style into their own.

Eddie Rector is credited as the originator of a number of steps including the slap step, variations on the waltz clog, and his percussive cake walk. In Dixie to Broadway (1924) he introduced the "Bambalina." The Bambalina was “a traveling time step that used the whole body and emphasized clean and precise footwork.”

Eddie Rector was a master of the sand dance. The sand dance originated from plantation dance. When drums were deemed to be a method of communication and were banned by enslavers, enslaved peoples used their bodies to generate rhythm. Dancing on sand amplified the sounds. For Black tap dance artists, the sand dance is a continuation of the resistance against anti-Black racism. A resistance embedded in percussive dance. The revival of Shuffle Along featured Rector doing a sand dance.

Eddie Rector's soft shoe is considered to be unparalleled. The soft shoe is a graceful dance that requires control and elegance. For many tap dance artists, the soft shoe can be one of the most challenging styles to master. The American Tap Dance Foundation lists Eddie Rector as an influencer of the soft shoe styles of the Nicolas Brothers and Pete Nugent. Rector's soft shoe influenced the Copasetics, a group of male tap dance artists formed to honor the legacy of Bill Bojangles Robinson. Their “copasetic soft shoe” is copied and danced by many to this day, making the legacy of Eddie Rector live on.
