= Jessie Coles Grayson =

American actress and singer (1886–1953)

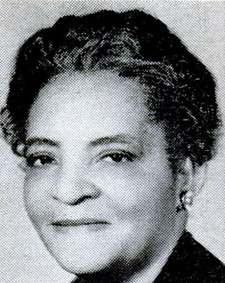
- Born: Jessie Coles; March 7, 1886; Albia, Iowa, U.S.
- Died: February 27, 1953 (aged 66); Los Angeles County, California, US
- Occupations: Actress, singer
- Years active: 1921–1953
- Spouse: Garner Van Grayson
- Children: 2

Jessie Coles Grayson (also credited as Jessie Grayson and Jessica Grayson) (March 7, 1886 – February 27, 1953) was an American singer and actress, known for The Little Foxes (1941), Cass Timberlane (1947) and Homecoming (1948).

== Early life and activities ==
Grayson was born in 1886 in Albia, Iowa. She lived in Los Angeles from the age of eight and after marrying she moved to Portland, Oregon. There she studied with Portland voice teacher J. William Belcher.

Grayson was active in civic organizations. She was elected as a secretary of the National Association of Colored Women in 1928. She was on the Portland committee of the National Association for the Advancement of Colored People in 1929 and was president of the Oregon Federated Club Women in 1936. In the late 1930s and early 1940s, she was active in the YWCA in California. In 1944, she was named as "the outstanding woman for 1943" by the Xi Alpha chapter of the Zeta Phi Beta sorority in Pittsburgh. Her hobby was collecting rare American pottery.

== Singing career ==
During the 1920s and 1930s, Grayson performed on stage and radio as a contralto soloist. In 1929, before a performance at a concert in Seattle, she was advertised as "Portland's Famous Contralto", and a review in the Northwest Enterprise said, "Mrs. Grayson proved herself an artist in every sense of the word. She is a master of contralto voice which she uses effectively and without exaggeration."

== Film career ==
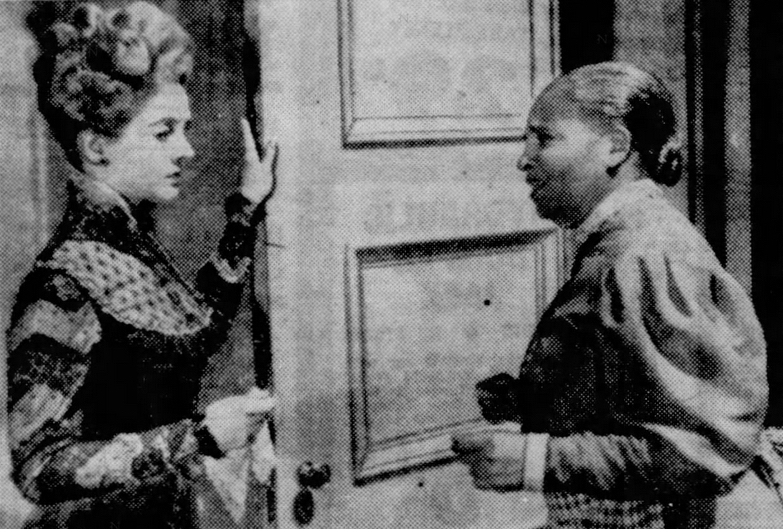
Bette Davis and Jessie Grayson in The Little Foxes

Grayson's first screen role was in 1939 in the all-black film One Dark Night, intended as an African-American version of the Hardy films.

She was next cast in The Little Foxes in 1941, in the role of Addie. One review of the film reported that Grayson "had never been on the screen before", and that "absolutely unknown, [she] got the job by telephoning [the casting director], who was so intrigued by the quality of her voice that he arranged the test which landed her the part." Another said that she "braved the Goldwyn studios when she learned through friends of the role in The Little Foxes. She had taken part in a few non-professional theatricals in ... Los Angeles, but had practically no contact with the theatre or films. Given a test, she won out over many veteran .. players". She was described as "a fine character actress" and her role of Addie "the wise 'aristocratic' servant who is one of the dominant characters in the picture."

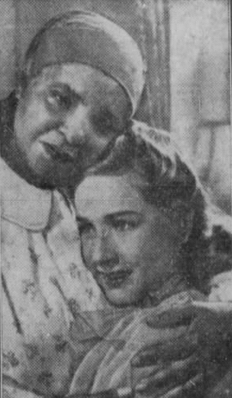
Jessie Grayson and Bonita Granville in the 1943 film Syncopation

In its review of Syncopation (1942), in which Grayson played a blues-singing servant whose young son is musical, the African-American newspaper Amsterdam News reported that Grayson's role was not that of an "Aunt Dinah" and saw in the film evidence of a move in Hollywood to represent African-Americans more positively. One reviewer considered that the best acting in a film that otherwise disappointed was from the African-American actors, including Grayson, saying "They play naturally in settings that seem authentic. If the rest of Syncopation reached their level the [movie theater] might have had something to shout about."

Grayson's role in Cass Timberlane was also considered significant, as she "counsels and listens to Judge [Timberlane] throughout the picture". The magazine Ebony and the 1948 edition of the Negro Who's Who in California both noted that "the Negro maid [is] called for the first time on the screen 'Mrs.' Higby". The Pittsburgh Courier quoted the director, George Sidney, as saying, "I think six years ago we would have cast a comedy performer in it. But the war has made us more conscious ... more aware that Negro comic and mammy roles, like Jewish comics and Italian pushcart peddlers, have become unfair, dangerous symbols. So ... we wanted a normal, intelligent character actress ..." hence Mrs. Grayson."

== Stage career ==
In 1946, she was cast in the four-state touring production of Deep Are the Roots, by Arnaud d'Usseau and James Gow, in the role of Bella Charles, the mother of the African-American war veteran, which had been played in the Broadway production by Evelyn Ellis. A reviewer in Chicago wrote, "The best roles belong to Henry Scott as the framed Negro and to Jessie Grayson as his terrified mother, and they give living performances, illuminated by validity, deepened by compassion." Grayson reprised the role in the San Francisco and Los Angeles productions of the play in 1948.

== Personal life and death ==
Grayson married Garner Van Grayson, with whom she had a daughter and a son. She died on February 27, 1953, in Los Angeles County, California, US.

=== Filmography ===
Year	Title	Role	Notes	References
1939	One Dark Night	Grandmother		
1941	The Little Foxes	Addie		
1942	Syncopation	Ella Tearbone, servant, mother of a boy with musical talent		
1943	The Youngest Profession	Lilybud, housekeeper		
1944	The Adventures of Mark Twain	Housekeeper	Uncredited	
1944	Wilson	Maid	Uncredited	
1946	Tomorrow Is Forever	Servant	Uncredited	
1947	The Unfinished Dance	Ariane's Maid	Uncredited	
1947	Cass Timberlane	Mrs. Higbee		
1948	Homecoming	Sarah, Johnson's Maid		
1949	Mr. Adam's Bomb		Short	
1950	Stars in My Crown	Bessie - Maid	Uncredited	
1950	Our Very Own	Violet	(final film role)	

=== Selected stage performances ===
Year	Title	Theatre	Role	Author
1944-1945	Ladies' Room	Filmcity Playhouse, Los Angeles		Janet Clark
1946	Deep Are the Roots	New Haven, CT; Boston, MA; Philadelphia, PA; Selwyn Theater, Chicago, IL	Bella Charles, war veteran's mother	Arnaud d'Usseau and James Gow
1948	Deep Are the Roots	Belasco Theater, Los Angeles; Tivoli Theater, San Francisco	Bella Charles	
