= Bette Treadville =

American singer and actress (1911–1989)

- Bette Treadville, from a 1939 city directory.
- Born: May 2, 1911
- Died: February 3, 1989 (aged 77); Los Angeles, California
- Other names: Betty Treadville, Bettie Treadville
- Occupations: actress, singer

Bette Treadville (May 2, 1911 – February 3, 1989) was an American singer and actress, based in Los Angeles, California.

== Career ==
Treadville was known as a "torch singer", a contralto who favored blues and ballads. She sang in Paris in the 1930s. She was described as the "heavy, heavy mama of song", in reference to her physique and performance style, and billed as "The Girl of 1,000 Songs" for her extensive repertoire, "some nice, some spicy". She was based in Los Angeles, a singer at Curtis Mosby's Club Alabam on the city's Central Avenue from 1933 to 1940. In 1935, she performed in a fundraising concert organized by Clarence Muse, benefiting the NAACP's anti-lynching work. She sang on radio shows, and made at least one recording, singing "Baby, Ain'tcha Satisfied?" with the Ceelle Burke orchestra, in 1936.

As an actress, Treadville appeared in several films, including the comedy One Dark Night (1939; re-released as Night Club Girl in 1944), a race film, now lost, co-starring comedian Mantan Moreland; it was reported that Hattie McDaniel turned down the Treadville role. Other film roles for Treadville were small parts in As Good as Married (1937), All's Fair (1938), East of Eden (1955), and Day of the Nightmare (1965). She was also seen in episodes of the television shows The New Phil Silvers Show (1963) and Ben Casey (1965). On stage, appeared in the Mary Sullivan comedy Halo on a Shelf (1961) in Hollywood, and in a revival of Rain in Pasadena, in a 1963 production starring Vera Miles. In 1973, she had a role in the Beah Richards show One is a Crowd in Los Angeles.

== Personal life ==
Treadville was described in 1932 as "recently estranged wife of Sunburnt Jim" Wilson, a dancer and radio comedian. She died in Los Angeles in 1989, aged 77 years.
