= Our Wife (1941 film) =

1941 film by John M. Stahl

- Directed by: John M. Stahl
- Written by: P. J. Wolfson
- Based on: Our Wife; 1933 play by Lillian Day and Lyon Mearson
- Produced by: John M. Stahl; Irving Starr
- Starring: Melvyn Douglas; Ruth Hussey; Ellen Drew
- Cinematography: Franz Planer
- Edited by: Gene Havlick
- Music by: Leo Shuken
- Production company: Columbia Pictures
- Distributed by: Columbia Pictures
- Release date: August 4, 1941
- Running time: 95 minutes
- Country: United States
- Language: English

Our Wife is a 1941 American romantic comedy film directed by John M. Stahl and starring Melvyn Douglas, Ruth Hussey and Ellen Drew. It was produced and distributed by Columbia Pictures.

== Synopsis ==
When a composer comes up with a hit, his ex-wife sets out to break up his romance with another woman and get him back.

== Cast ==
- Melvyn Douglas as Jerome "Jerry" Marvin
- Ruth Hussey as Professor Susan Drake
- Ellen Drew as Babe Marvin
- Charles Coburn as Professor Drake
- John Hubbard as Tom Drake
- Harvey Stephens as Dr. Cassell
- Theresa Harris as Hattie
- Crauford Kent as Dr. Jenkins, Ship's Doctor
- Lawrence Grant as Dr. Holgarth
- Edward Fielding as Dr. Mandel
- Lloyd Bridges as Taxicab Driver
- Betty Blythe as Shipboard Passenger
- Hobart Cavanaugh as Shipboard Passenger
- Grace Darmond as Shipboard Passenger
- Cyril Ring as Shipboard Passenger
- Martin Garralaga as Cuban Driver
- Pedro Regas as Cuban Driver
- Roland Varno as Steward
- Irving Bacon as Doorman
- George Beranger as Waiter

== Reception ==
Bosley Crowther panned the film in The New York Times, writing, "the idea is one which would barely carry a ten-minute vaudeville skit. 'Our Wife' has grounds to sue its writers for non-support." He did praise Hussey and Douglas's performances, "considering that they have very little, or nothing, to do it with", but felt that Drew was "pleasant to look on but hard to take as the crafty wife".

== Bibliography ==
- Babington, Bruce & Barr, Charles. The Call of the Heart: John M. Stahl and Hollywood Melodrama. Indiana University Press, 2018.
