= The Youngest Profession =

1943 film by Edward Buzzell

- Australian theatrical poster
- Directed by: Edward Buzzell
- Written by: Lillian Day (book); George Oppenheimer; Charles Lederer; Leonard Spigelgass; Jan Isbell Fortune
- Produced by: B.F. Zeidman
- Starring: Virginia Weidler; Edward Arnold; John Carroll
- Cinematography: Charles Lawton Jr.
- Edited by: Ralph E. Winters
- Music by: David Snell
- Distributed by: Metro-Goldwyn-Mayer
- Release date: February 26, 1943
- Running time: 82 minutes
- Country: United States
- Language: English
- Budget: $446,000
- Box office: $1,546,000

The Youngest Profession is a 1943 comedy film directed by Edward Buzzell, and starring Virginia Weidler, Edward Arnold, John Carroll, Scotty Beckett, and Agnes Moorehead. Based on a short story series and 1940 novel written by Lillian Day, it contains cameos by Greer Garson, Lana Turner, William Powell, Walter Pidgeon, and Robert Taylor.

== Plot ==
Lively teen Joan Lyons and her best friend, Patricia Drew, are dedicated autograph seekers who run around New York City attempting to meet celebrities. Deceived by trouble-making governess Miss Featherstone, Joan is distracted from her star-chasing by concerns over her parents' marriage. This leads Joan to hire a muscle man named Dr. Hercules to flirt with her mother, which only results in more misunderstandings.

== Cast ==
- Virginia Weidler as Joan Lyons
- Edward Arnold as Burton V. Lyons
- John Carroll as Dr. Hercules
- Ann Ayers as Susan Thayer
- Marta Linden as Edith Lyons
- Dick Simmons as Douglas Sutton
- Agnes Moorehead as Miss Featherstone
- Jean Porter as Patricia Drew
- Raymond Roe as Schuyler
- Dorothy Morris as Secretary
- Scotty Beckett as Junior Lyons
- Marcia Mae Jones as Vera Bailey
- Sara Haden as Sister Lassie
- Beverly Tyler as Thyra Winter
- Marjorie Gateson as Mrs. Drew
- Jessie Coles Grayson as Lilybud

== Box office ==
According to MGM records, the film earned $1,187,000 in the US and Canada and $359,000 elsewhere resulting in a profit of $583,000.
