= Edward Lewis (filmmaker) =

American filmmaker and photographer

Edward Lewis was a photographer and filmmaker who documented prominent African Americans and their activities in his documentary film series. He worked as a photographer for the Daily News before becoming a filmmaker.

He made 12 documentary shorts for Million Dollar Productions in the Life in Harlem series in 1936.

Lewis made the film Colored America on Parade. Lewis also produced The Colored Champions of Sports.

== Filmography ==
- Life in Harlem (1938), 12 part documentary series for Million Dollar Productions
- Colored Champions of Sports
- Colored America on Parade
