= Personal Maid's Secret =

1935 film by Arthur Greville Collins

- Directed by: Arthur Greville Collins
- Screenplay by: Lillie Hayward; F. Hugh Herbert
- Story by: Lillian Day
- Produced by: Bryan Foy
- Starring: Margaret Lindsay; Warren Hull; Anita Louise; Ruth Donnelly; Arthur Treacher; Frank Albertson
- Cinematography: Byron Haskin
- Edited by: Thomas Richards
- Music by: Howard Jackson
- Production company: Warner Bros. Pictures
- Distributed by: Warner Bros. Pictures
- Release date: October 26, 1935
- Running time: 58 minutes
- Country: United States
- Language: English

Personal Maid's Secret is a 1935 American comedy film directed by Arthur Greville Collins and written by Lillie Hayward and F. Hugh Herbert. The film stars Margaret Lindsay, Warren Hull, Anita Louise, Ruth Donnelly, Arthur Treacher and Frank Albertson. The film was released by Warner Bros. Pictures on October 26, 1935. A print is held by the Library of Congress.

== Plot ==
Lizzie, a longtime servant of an upperclass Park Avenue family, quits because she has not been paid for months. At an employment agency, she encounters Joan Smith and her young son. Joan is looking for a maid. Lizzie takes a liking to Joan and her child Bobby and negotiates a salary that is higher than what Joan was hoping to pay, but much lower than what she was getting before. Joan's husband, struggling insurance salesman Jimmy, is initially appalled at Lizzie's salary, but Joan gets him to reconsider.

Lizzie repeatedly persuades Joan to upgrade her family's lifestyle so they can mingle with the elite and Jimmy can make valuable business contacts. Joan then talks her husband into paying for it all, despite his strong reservations. It works. Jimmy is able to sell large policies to his new acquaintances.

Meanwhile, Joan's inventor brother, Kent Fletcher, meets and falls in love with Diana Abercrombie, newly returned from a European finishing school. She, however, is infatuated with married womanizer Warren Sherrill, though she does like Kent.

When Lizzie finds Diana and Warren together late one night, she tries to separate them. When that fails, she insists on speaking to Diana alone. She then reveals that she is Diana's mother. She secretly married Diana's father the day before he left for World War I. When he was killed, Lizzie agreed to let his wealthy parents raise Diana as their own, as she, then their upstairs maid, could not provide what they could. At first, Diana is hostile to Lizzie, but as time goes on, she comes to love her mother, breaks up with Warren and warms to Kent. Meanwhile, Lizzie finds love again, with Owen, the former butler of her former employer.

== Cast ==
- Margaret Lindsay as Joan
- Warren Hull as Jimmy
- Anita Louise as Diana
- Ruth Donnelly as Lizzie
- Arthur Treacher as Owen
- Frank Albertson as Kent Fletcher
- Henry O'Neill as Mr. Wilton Palmer
- Ronnie Cosby as Bobby Smith
- Wild Bill Elliott as Warren Sherrill
- Claude King as Mr. Abercrombie
- Etta McDaniel as Maid
