= One Dark Night (1939 film) =

- Directed by: Leo C. Popkin
- Produced by: Harry M. Popkin
- Starring: Mantan Moreland
- Production company: Million Dollar Productions
- Release date: 1939
- Country: USA
- Language: English

One Dark Night is an American film released in 1939. Also known as Night Club Girl. It was directed by Leo C. Popkin. It was produced by Harry M. Popkin. The film features an African American cast including Mantan Moreland in a dramatic role.

== Cast ==
- Mantan Moreland as Samson Brown
- Josephine Pearson as Barbara Brown
- Betty Treadville as Hannah Brown
- Jessie Coles Grayson as Mom

== Production and release ==
Hattie McDaniel reportedly turned down the role played by Bette Treadville. The film was made by Million Dollar Productions and distributed by Sack Amusement Enterprises. It was produced by Clifford Sanforth. The film drew various black celebrities to a showing. Josephine Edwards performs two songs in the lost film.

The film was re-released as Night Club Girl in 1944. It is categorized as a race film, and is now lost. The Yale University Library has a lobby card for the film.
