= Cass Timberlane =

1947 film by George Sidney

- Theatrical poster
- Directed by: George Sidney
- Screenplay by: Donald Ogden Stewart
- Adaptation: Donald Ogden Stewart; Sonya Levien
- Based on: Cass Timberlane: A Novel of Husbands and Wives; 1945 novel by Sinclair Lewis
- Produced by: Arthur Hornblow, Jr.
- Starring: Spencer Tracy; Lana Turner; Zachary Scott
- Cinematography: Robert Planck
- Edited by: John Dunning
- Music by: Roy Webb
- Production company: Metro-Goldwyn-Mayer
- Distributed by: Loew's, Inc.
- Release date: November 6, 1947 (New York City)
- Running time: 119 minutes
- Country: United States
- Language: English
- Budget: $2,733,000
- Box office: $5,186,000 (worldwide rentals)

Cass Timberlane is a 1947 American romantic drama film directed by George Sidney and starring Spencer Tracy, Lana Turner and Zachary Scott. It was based on the 1945 novel Cass Timberlane: A Novel of Husbands and Wives by Sinclair Lewis, which was Lewis' nineteenth novel and one of his last.

== Plot ==
Cass Timberlane is a middle-aged, highly respected judge in a small Minnesota town. One day, he presides over numerous divorce cases and takes particular notice of Virginia "Ginny" Marshland, a much younger woman, when she takes the stand. Cass adjourns for the day and returns Ginny's notebook she left behind the courtroom, though he keeps her sketch of him in his personal library. Back at home, Cass plays his flute until a kitten sneaks in, which inflames his allergies. Cass steps out and walks across the tracks where he finds Ginny playing baseball. Cass offers to serve as umpire, and after which they dine at a local restaurant.

Meanwhile, Cass's upper-class friends gossip about his kindling relationship to Ginny. Ignoring their objections, Cass takes her to the Grand Republic country club and eventually marries her. Back in the courtroom, Cass declines a motion to recuse himself from a shareholders' lawsuit against the Wargates. Ginny becomes pregnant but gives birth to a stillborn daughter. To ease her troubles, Cass pays for Ginny to learn how to fly an airplane. During their flights together, she and Cass's attorney friend Bradd Criley begin to bond. At the same time, Ginny takes up acting and rehearses a love scene with Bradd at the country club. When the performance becomes all too realistic Cass suspects Ginny of adultery. To quiet the rumors, Bradd leaves for New York City.

After her stage performance, Ginny confides to her husband she has grown depressed and suggests relocating elsewhere. They leave for New York City where Cass meets with a college friend in the interest of being a law partner. However, Cass withdraws the offer while Ginny socializes with Bradd. Cass tells Ginny he has declined the job offer and will return home, which infuriates Ginny who decides to remain in New York. Cass reassumes his judicial bench as Ginny and Bradd dine together. Realizing Bradd will not marry her, Ginny leaves. As Bradd drives Ginny, she jumps out of a moving vehicle and suffers internal injuries.

Back in Minnesota, Cass learns of Ginny’s injuries and flies back to New York. At an apartment, where Ginny is resting, Cass stays at her bedside. He takes her back home, where she makes a full recovery. Recognizing Ginny's longing for freedom, Cass agrees to a divorce if she wishes to return to New York. As he pledges to be a faithful husband, Ginny decides to stay.

== Cast ==
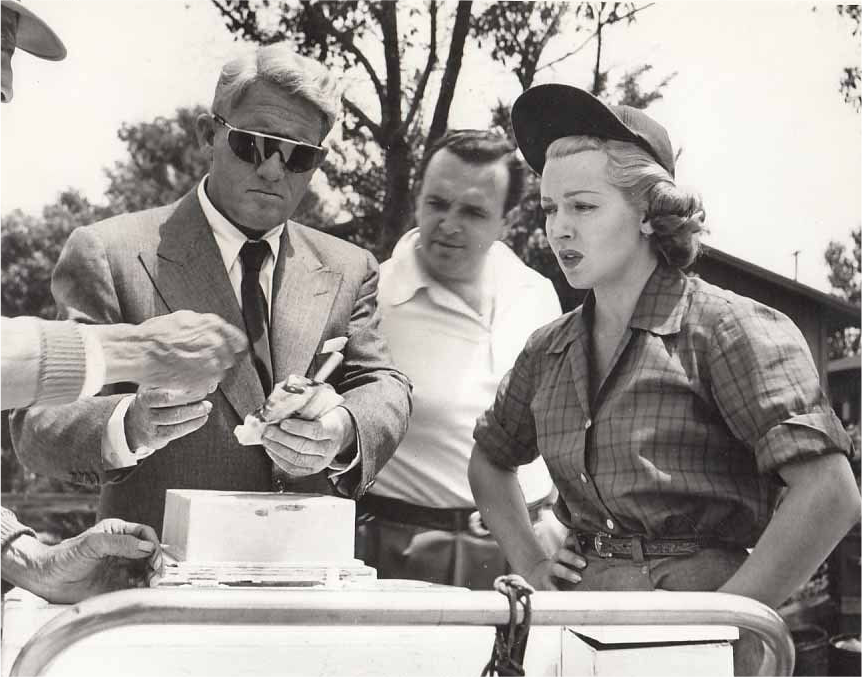
Spencer Tracy, George Sidney and Lana Turner on the set of Cass Timberlane

- Spencer Tracy as Cass Timberlane
- Lana Turner as Virginia "Ginny" Marshland
- Zachary Scott as Bradd Criley
- Tom Drake as Jamie Wargate
- Mary Astor as Queenie Havock
- Albert Dekker as Boone Havock
- Margaret Lindsay as Chris Grau
- Rose Hobart as Diantha Marl
- John Litel as Webb Wargate
- Mona Barrie as Avis Elderman
- Josephine Hutchinson as Lillian Drover
- Selena Royle as Louise Wargate
- Frank Wilcox as Gregg Marl
- Richard Gaines as Dennis Thane
- John Alexander as Dr. Roy Drover
- Cameron Mitchell as Eino Roskinen
- Howard Freeman as Hervey Plint
- Griff Barnett as Herman
- Jessie Grayson as Mrs. Higbee
- Gordon Richards as the Butler (uncredited)

== Production ==
Donald Ogden Stewart, who worked on the script, recalled:

Spencer Tracy was a terribly professional actor who worked on the script and knew it by heart, and Lana’d come onto the set not having the foggiest idea what the thing was about, not knowing the lines or anything. Spencer was very angry during the first couple of weeks. Then it got better, and at the end he said: “That is a good actress.” She got his respect eventually, and I think Cass was quite a good picture.

=== Cultural references ===
Wolcott Gibbs spoofed the novel in The New Yorker as "Shad Ampersand". The song "Cleo the Cat" by the band Benton Harbor Lunchbox was inspired by the novel Cass Timberlane: A Novel of Husbands and Wives.

== Reception ==
Though it received tepid critical reviews, the film was a box office hit, earning $3,983,000 in the U.S. and Canada and $1,203,000 elsewhere, but because of its high production cost, it returned a profit of only $746,000.

== Home media ==
Cass Timberlane was released to DVD by Warner Home Video on July 6, 2010, via Warner Archives as a DVD-on-demand disc available through Amazon.

== In other media ==
=== Radio ===
Cass Timberlane was presented on Theatre Guild on the Air February 15, 1953. The one-hour adaptation starred Fredric March and Nina Foch.
