= Lillian Day =

American novelist and playwright

Lillian Day Lederer or Lillian Ethel Abrams (June 27, 1893 – March 29, 1991) was an American novelist, playwright, screenwriter, and biographer. Some of her work was produced on Broadway and adapted to film. She married and collaborated with mystery writer Lyon Mearson.

== Early life ==
Lillian Ethel Abrams was born on June 27, 1893, in Manhattan, New York City. She was the daughter of Amelia M. Fendler-Abrams and Alexander Abrams, both prominent physicians in New York City the 1890s. Her parents separated in 1907 and had a scandalous divorce case in March 1912, with eighteen-year-old Lillian testifying on her mother's behalf. Fendler-Abrams testified that her husband was consistently under the influence of alcohol. Despite Dr. Alexander Abrams' claims of his wife's infidelity, he was unsuccessful in obtaining a divorce from Fender-Abrams.

== Career ==
She began her career writing for magazines in the 1920s under Lillian Day. Her work appeared in The New Yorker and The Saturday Evening Post. She continued to use her first husband's surname, Day, as her pen name, despite a divorce and two additional marriages.

Day wrote the novel Kiss and Tell in 1931. In 1932, she published the novel Our Wife from a collaboration with her second husband, Lyon Mearson. She later created a play based on the novel that was produced on Broadway in the Booth Theatre on Broadway in March 1933. The play was made into the 1941 film Our Wife by Columbia Pictures.

She co-wrote the screenplay for Wayward, a film released by Paramount in 1932. She collaborated with her third husband, Norbert Lederer, to write the mysteries Murder in Time in 1933 and Death Comes on Friday in 1937. The Chicago Tribune noted that the latter was "a smartly turned mystery with an intreging cast of characters, swift action, and a dénouement that is startling but completely logical and fair to the reader.'

Day's short story, "Living up to Lizzie", was adapted into the film Personal Maid's Secret, released by Warner Bros. Pictures in 1935. The Youngest Profession, a novel she wrote in 1938, was made into a play, A Woman of Fifteen, in 1943 and a film, The Youngest Profession, in 1943. She also co-wrote the play, Collector's Item, which ran on Broadway in the Booth Theatre on in February 1952.

Day also wrote several biographies. Her book on violinist Niccolò Paganini was published in 1929. The Philadelphia Inquirer wrote, "Until this gossipy, but informing biography by Miss Day appeared his profile to posterity was a caricature." In 1946, she wrote a biography for children about composer and Edvard Grieg. In 1957, she published Ninon, a Courtesan of Quality about Ninon de l'Enclos.

== Personal life ==
She married three times. Her first husband was Mr. Day, giving her the surname she used as an author. Her second husband was playwright and author Lyon Mearson, noted as "a master of mystery stories". The couple married in 1928 and divorced in early 1934. However, Walter Winchell reported that they had been seen together in October 1934, and implied a rekindling of the relationship. She announced her engagement to Dr. Norbert Lewis Lederer in December 1934 and married him around 1946. He was a chemical engineer, former attache to Scotland Yard, and author on crime, tropical fish and chess.

In 1950, Day moved to France with Lederer. He died in Paris in November 1955. She lived in Paris and Neuilly-sur-Seine for thirty years.

Day lived in the DeWitt Nursing Home in Manhattan for eight years. She died there of heart failure on March 29, 1991 at the age of 98.

== Selected publications ==
=== Novels ===
- Kiss and Tell. New York: Farrar & Rinehart, Inc.,1931.
- Our Wife. with Lyon Mearson. New York: 1932.
- Murder in Time. with Norbert Lederer/ Green Circle Books, 1933.
- Death Comes on Friday. with Norbert Lederer. New York: E. P. Dutton and Co., 1937.
- The Youngest Profession. Garden City, 1940.
- Domestic Symphony. London: Temple Press, 1947.

=== Biographies ===
- Paganini of Genoa. New York: Macauley Co., 1929.
- Edgar Degas. by Camille Mauclair. Adapted by Lillian Day. New York: Hyperion Press, 1945.
- Ninon, a Courtesan of Quality. New York: Doubleday, 1957.

=== Children's books ===
- Andersen's Fairy Tales. Adapted by Lillian Day. New York: Hyperion Press and Duell Sloan and Pearce, 1946.
- Grieg. New York: Hyperion Press, 1946.

=== Plays ===
- Our Wife with Lyon Mearson (1933)
- Collector's Item with Alfred Golden (1952)

=== Short stories ===
- "Living up to Lizzie," The Saturday Evening Post, December 8, 1934.

=== Adaptations of her work ===
==== Plays ====
- Chadwick, Alice (aka Wilbur Braun). A Woman of Fifteen: A Brisk Comedy of Youth in Three Acts (Samuel French, 1943). Based on Day's novel, The Youngest Profession.

==== Films ====
- Wayward (1932), co-wrote screenplay with Gladys Unger
- Personal Maid's Secret, based on "Living up to Lizzie" (1935)
- Our Wife (1941)
- The Youngest Profession (1943)
