= Midnight Shadow =

- Directed by: George Randol
- Screenplay by: Arthur Reed
- Produced by: George Randol; Alfred N. Sack
- Starring: Frances Redd; Ollie Ann Robinson; Clinton Rosemond; Laurence Criner
- Cinematography: Arthur Reed
- Edited by: Robert Jahns
- Music by: Johnny Lange; Lew Porter
- Production company: George Randol Productions
- Distributed by: Sack Amusement Enterprises
- Release date: 1939
- Running time: 54 min
- Country: United States
- Language: English

Midnight Shadow is a 1939 film with an all African-American cast. It was directed and produced by George Randol, who was also African American.

== Plot ==
The mind-reading Prince Alihabad courts a girl from Oklahoma played by Frances E. Redd. Her parents want to make her happy, but they do not like that Alihabad worships Allah. A killer is on the loose and locals fear that it might be Alihabad.

== Cast ==
- Frances Redd as Margaret Wilson
- Buck Woods as Lightfoot
- Richard Bates as Jr. Lingley
- Clinton Rosemond as Mr. Dan Wilson
- Jesse Lee Brooks as Sergeant Ramsey
- Edward Brandon as Buster Barnett
- Ollie Ann Robinson as Mrs. Emma Wilson
- Laurence Criner (billed as John Criner) as Prince Alihabad
- Pete Webster (actor) as John Mason
- Ruby Dandridge as Mrs. Lingley
- Napoleon Simpson as Mr. Ernest Lingley

== Book coverage ==
The film was briefly discussed in terms of plot and as an African American production in the books Hollywood Be Thy Name: African American Religion in American Film, 1929-1949 and Whispered Consolations: Law and Narrative in African American Life.
