= Pete Nugent =

American tap dancer (1909–1973)

Gary "Pete" Nugent (July 16, 1909 – April 25, 1973) was an American tap dancer known as "Public Tapper, Number 1". He was also part of the class act, Pete, Peaches, and Duke.

Nugent performed all over the world including across Europe in World War II and in Mexico, but had a focus on New York and Harlem in particular. He danced with many of the greats including Honi Coles, Bunny Briggs, Charles 'Cookie' Cook, and Peg Leg Bates.

== Early life ==
Nugent was born in Washington, D.C., July 16, 1909 to Pauline Minerva Bruce, the offspring of a Scottish Loyalist and Richard H. Nugent, Jr., an elevator man. After their father's death, Nugent's mother who could pass as white in New York at the time, boarded her two sons, Pete and Richard Bruce Nugent, who could not pass as white, in Harlem, New York. He started dancing at the age of fourteen while hanging around hoofer’s clubs and then ran away from home and started tapping on the "Black circuit" at age sixteen. While he drew from a great variety of dancers, his biggest influence was Eddie Rector. Nugent was known for his ability to pick up steps from others, particularly George Walker. He worked as messenger at a store in Harlem, until Paul Ford offered Nugent his start as part of his production for $30/week, twice what he had been making before.

== Career ==
The tap dance trio, Pete, Peaches, and Duke, often known as the “Sepia Sons,”[24] was formed by Pete Nugent at age 19 in Chicago with Irving "Peaches" Beaman, with the addition of Duke Miller in 1931. Known not only for their “precision-line military drill”, but also for their various sharply dressed looks, each member of the group was said to have 26 suits, 26 pairs of shoes, and 300 ties. These were accompanied by a great number of accessories including socks, collars, and buttons that numbered well into the hundreds. They performed with a number of solos interspersed with moments of unison all of which culminated in a “one man exit” where they lined up behind each other and walked of stage in sync. A “class act,” the trio stayed away from, “temptation to let go with some flash steps,” and instead leaned into precision and continuity.

In 1935 they performed as part of Connie's Hot Chocolates of 1935 and were called to the International Dance Congress at Broadway and appointed to the faculty of staff. They were only the third people of color to receive this honor. Around the same time, it was noted that the group left shows rapidly after they ended, leaving the public in confusion as to why Pete, Peaches, and Duke were not participating in the nightlife scene. As it turns out, they had been going back to their newly acquired library from Broadway columnist Mark Hellinger and reading.

After Duke's untimely death in 1937, Pete and Peaches performed a few times together, but never reformed as a tap trio and the two remaining dancers set out on their own.

=== Pete, Peaches, and Duke performances ===
- At the Cotton Club, October 1931
- At the Howard Theatre, November 1931
- As part of Irving Mills', “Harlem Scandals,” 1932
- At Lafayette Theatre in Harlem, December 1932
- Performed with Don Redman and his orchestra in Detroit, March 1933
- In the Elida Webb Show at Harlem Opera House, July 1934
- In the Battle of Revues at the Harlem Opera House, July 1934
- At the Apollo Theater, September 1934
- Had the finale in Shuffle Along in Providence, October 1934
- Performed at the Apollo, February 1935
- Performed in Fats Waller's “Song Shop Revue,” February 1934
- At Connie's Inn, Spring 1935
- Performed in the Mammoth Revue at Loew’s State Theater, May 1935
- Played with Lou Holtz, Block and Sully and Belle Baker at Loew’s Fox in Washington, October 1935
- At the Stanley Theatre, October 1935
- At Loew's Theatre, October 1935
- Performed under producer Clarence Robinson at the Douglas Theater in Philadelphia, November 1935
- In Chicago, January 1936
- In Mexico for six weeks at the Theater Almeda, April 1936

On July 15, 1942, Nugent was inducted into the army. As part of the first integrated unit in the army due to the casting that Irving Berlin wanted for his show. Throughout his time in the army, Nugent toured Europe as part of the show, This Is The Army in an octet that he trained. In 1944 he was stationed in the fifth army in Italy and was a corporal. He was honorably discharged from the army sometime between 1944 and 1946.

Despite the lack of video recordings of him, throughout his time as a solo artist, Gary ‘Pete’ Nugent was well regarded as “Public Tapper, Number 1.” His solo career really took off after his army discharge and he worked on his own. In addition to a number of performances, Pete Nugent also went on a number of other ventures in his time. These included opening the Dance Craft studio on Fifty-Second Street in New York City with Charles 'Honi' Coles, serving as the road manager of The Temptations, being part of the original group of Copasetics founded in memory of Bill 'Bojangles' Robinson, worked with the Sidewalks of New York, and worked at Henry LeTang's downtown dance studio starting in November 1947. He worked at the Harlem Casino until its closing in 1939. In 1940, Nugent was hired by Chappie Willet’s Artists Enterprises. Then, in September 1950, Nugent signed with Norma Miller and her company. He was considered not only to be one of the best in her company, but also one of the best in the business. Nugent also taught boxer, Ray Robinson, three dances that he would take on tour in October 1951. This was followed by the staging and presentation of 33 debutantes at Hotel St. George in conjunction with Honi Coles in 1957.

=== Performances during Nugent's solo career- ===
- Performed for one week starting Monday, April 18, 1927 with Irvin C. Miller's Perfect Revue of Desires of 1927
- Performed at the Knickerbocker, November 1927
- Performed with the Davis Brothers in Chicago, May 1928
- Danced with Peaches in Chicago, September 1928
- Danced with Peaches at the Plantation Club, March 1930
- Performed in the Monster Midnight Show to benefit the Florence Mills Memorial Fund, February 18, 1930
- Performed at the Apollo, September 1939
- Returned to the Apollo, June 1940
- Performed at the Apollo, September 1940
- Performed with Ovie Alston and his band at the West End Theatre, October 25, 1940
- Duke Ellington's Jump for Joy, 1941
- Performed at the Rhumboogie Cafe, May 1942
- Performed with Erskine Hawkin's Orchestra at Apollo Theater, June/July 1942
- Performed with Billy Eckstine's band in which he did a soft shoe routine that went with clarinet and piano, 1944
- Performed at the Club Baron, 1946
- Performed at Club 845, March 1947
- Performed at the Apollo, June 1947
- Performed at Club 845, January 1948
- Performed at Club Ebony, March–April 1948
- Starred in the Harlem division of the Cancer Committee’s show, May 1948
- Performed at Club 845, March 1949
- Performed in the Mount Vernon Camp Fund Benefit (in Mount Vernon, for the West Side YMCA), July 1950
- Performed at Club Elegante with Honi Coles, March 1941
- Performed as part of the Jazz Festival in New York, 1963

After an attempted retirement in the fifties, Nugent continued to perform on and off although with less frequency. However, his being hired by The Temptations put a pause in that. After his official retirement from dance, Nugent worked as a bellman at the Holland Hotel.

== Legacy ==
Nugent was said to have “walked with a bounce and there was a nonchalant hunch to his shoulders.” Nugent said of himself and his dancing, “I'm a tap dancer first, last, and always, but if you have to make a choice, I prefer all body motion and no tap to all tap and no body motion. Any hoofer can execute all the steps, but the way a man handles his body and travels is what gives it class."

Throughout his career, Pete Nugent had a focus on the soft shoe side of tap and had a particular aversion to the loud noises and trick steps that the younger generations seemed to be using. In and of his own, he was described as nimble footed,[37] having a military staccato like dance style, being airy, and taking up a lot of space on the stage. Honi Coles said of his dance partner, “He had a different style of dancing completely. It's really hard to find words for that description. He was a beautiful dancer. He was from wing to wing, from the sides of the stage, and my dancing was more lose dancing, close to the floor, and he was airy. He was one of the finest class dancers, without a question . . . in terms of costume, deportment, cleanliness-- all of these things-- beauty, giving a message, a message as far as dancing was concerned-- Pete had all of these things.”

Very few examples of his choreography remain today due to the lack of video recordings (the only known tape of any kind that has a recording of Nugent on it is an audio tape that was made by Voice of America), but those existing include Nugent’s "Breezin'.” This is a routine from 1953 that builds on syncopation and movement. It is known as a result of Nancy Howell who studied with Pete Nugent at the Stanley Brown Studio.

Particularly because of his work with Pete, Peaches, and Duke, Nugent was known for having fabulous and clean costuming. However, it was also noted that he at times used a “high-brown powder finish” on his face rather than cork.

Known as “hard on the outside, soft on the inside,” Nugent was known for his swearing tendencies. However, he was also known as the “smiling boy”[62] and nothing can be found speaking poorly of him. Although there is no record of a marriage, Virginia Ryon sent him a telegram on his 26th birthday and was known to be his, “favorite heart throb.” Towards the end of his life, Nugent became rather solitary and is buried in the Long Island National Cemetery.
