= Straight to Heaven =

1939 film

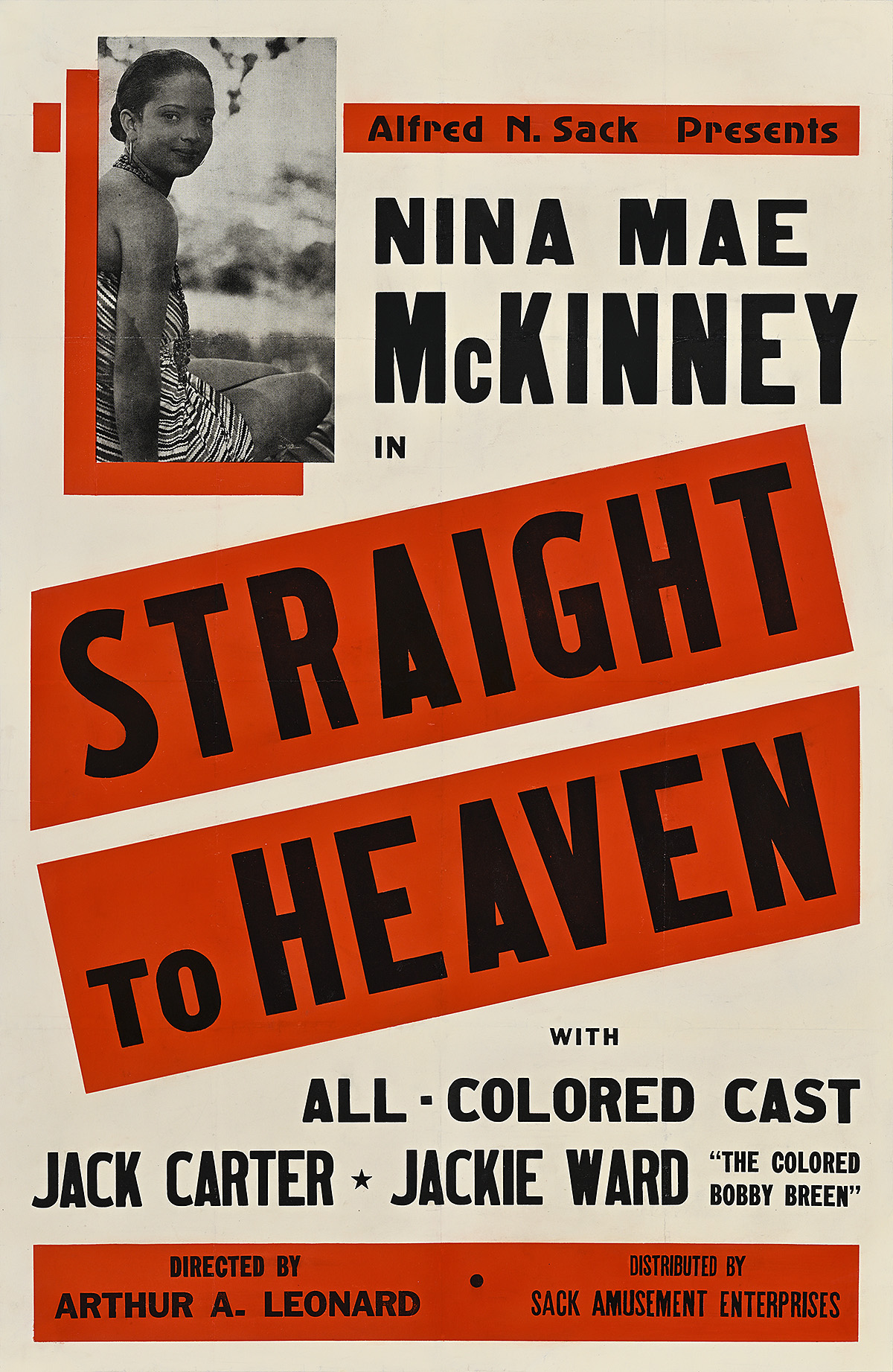
Poster, 1939

Straight to Heaven is an American film released in 1939. It was produced by Million Dollar Productions. It was advertised as having an all colored cast. Arthur A. Leonard directed. Sack Amusement Enterprises was the distributor.

The story features a cabaret singer, her singer son, and the criminal underworld. The film starred Nina Mae McKinney in her last major film role and Jackie Ward, a 12 year old performer from Harlem. Ward performs three songs in the film and McKinney one.

== Cast ==
- Nina Mae McKinney as Cabaret Singer Ida Williams
- Jack Carter
- Jackie Ward
- Lionel Monagas
- James Baskett
