= The Duke Is Tops =

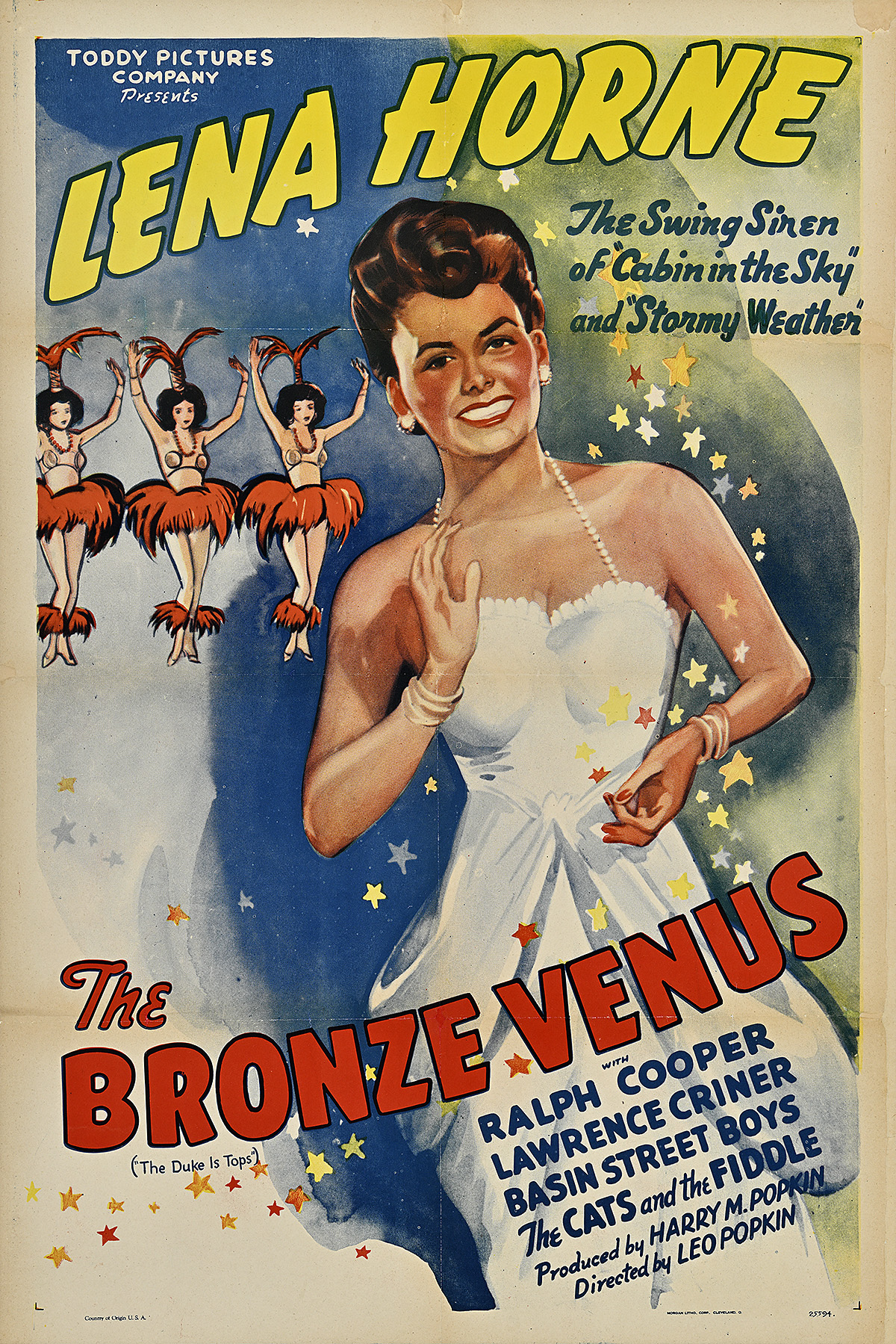
- Poster from the 1943 re-release as The Bronze Venus
- Directed by: William Nolte
- Written by: Adaptation: Phil Dunham
- Produced by: Harry M. Popkin
- Starring: Ralph Cooper; Lena Horne
- Cinematography: Robert E. Cline; J. Henry Kruse
- Edited by: Alice Greenwood; Arthur A. Brooks
- Music by: Harvey Brooks; Ben Ellison
- Production company: Million Dollar Productions
- Distributed by: Million Dollar Productions
- Release date: June 8, 1938
- Running time: 73 minutes
- Country: United States
- Language: English

The Duke Is Tops (full film)

The Duke Is Tops is a 1938 American musical film released by Million Dollar Productions and directed by William Nolte. The film was later released in 1944 under the title The Bronze Venus. It features top-billed Lena Horne in her film debut, along with Ralph Cooper. The film was one of the low-budget musical film "race movies" made in the 1930s and 1940s for the African-American market. The casts and production teams of these films were almost all black, and the music reflected current tastes in jazz and rhythm and blues.

== Plot ==
Duke Davis (Cooper) is a stage-show promoter in love with Ethel Andrews (Horne), a popular singer in his company dubbed "the Bronze Venus". Duke finds out that big-time promoters from New York City want to propel Ethel into the big leagues, but Ethel, out of loyalty and love for Duke, refuses to leave his small-time show. Duke, in a selfless act, orchestrates a deception to force Ethel to leave his show in order to better her career. However, the loss of the Bronze Venus causes Duke's own career to collapse and he soon finds himself working on a travelling medicine show where he goes from town to town, introducing a series of specialty musical acts and helping to sell Doc Dorando's all-purpose elixir. But when he hears that Ethel's New York gig is a flop, Duke goes to New York, where he is reunited with her. Soon after, Duke combines his stage show, the medicine show and Ethel's singing into a top nightclub act.

== Cast ==
- Ralph Cooper as Duke Davis
- Lena Horne as Ethel Andrews
- Laurence Criner as Doc Dorando
- Monte Hawley as George Marshall
- Neva Peoples as Ella
- Vernon McCalla as Mason
- Edward Thompson as Ferdie Fenton
- Johnny Taylor as Dippy ("Prince Alakazoo")
- Ray Martin as Joe
- Guernsey Morrow as Ed Lake
- Charles Hawkins as Sam, the Stage Manager
- Everett Brown as the Sheriff
- Arthur Ray as the druggist

Speciality acts appear throughout the film, including Willie Covan, the Basin Street Boys, Rubberneck Holmes, Cats and the Fiddle, the Marie Bryant Swing Band, and the Harlemania Orchestra.

== Production ==
The film was shot in 10 days on a shoe-string budget.

=== Casting ===
Ralph Cooper planned to star alongside Nina Mae McKinney as the female lead, but her delayed return from her appearances in Australia led to the role to be recast.

The Duke Is Tops features the film debut of singer Lena Horne, then aged 20, who had yet to develop the style she would use in her later films for Metro-Goldwyn-Mayer. She has a rare major acting role in this film, absent from her later career except for 1943's Cabin in the Sky, Stormy Weather and a few others. The original top-billed star, Ralph Cooper, was host of Amateur Night at the Apollo Theater for 50 years.

=== Music ===
The movie features singer Lena Horne and the Cats and the Fiddle singing group. Horne as Ethel sings the Harvey Brooks & Ben Ellison composition "I Know You Remember", with lyrics apropos of the film, "You and I have made a small beginning..." Horne also sings "Don't Let Our Love Song Turn Me Blue", with a lyric that foreshadows one of her future great roles: "True love will guide us through stormy weather"; and she reprises "I Know You Remember". The Cats & the Fiddle sing "Killin' Jive."

"I Know You Remember" and "Don't Let Our Love Song Turn Into a Blues," had words and music by Ben Ellison and Harvey Brooks. The composers of "Harlem is Harmony," "When You Smoke" and "Thursday Evening Swing" are undetermined.

== Reception ==
Variety wrote about Lena Horne that she was "a rather inept actress, but something to look at and hear." The film's premiere was a benefit for the NAACP, but Lena Horne's husband – who was opposed to her making the film – refused to allow her to attend, because she hadn't yet been paid for her work on the film.

== Distribution ==
The Duke Is Tops has been released on DVD in North America. The film is in the public domain in the U.S., and as such is available in multiple editions.
