= Jungle Queen (serial) =

1945 film by Ray Taylor, Lewis D. Collins

- Directed by: Lewis D. Collins; Ray Taylor
- Written by: George H. Plympton; Ande Lamb
- Produced by: Morgan Cox; Ray Taylor
- Starring: Edward Norris; Eddie Quillan; Douglass Dumbrille; Lois Collier; Ruth Roman; Tala Birell; Clarence Muse
- Cinematography: Maury Gertsman; William A. Sickner
- Edited by: Irving Birnbaum; Jack Dolan; Ace Herman; Alvin Todd; Edgar Zane
- Distributed by: Universal Pictures
- Release date: January 23, 1945
- Running time: 13 chapters (219 min)
- Country: United States
- Language: English

Jungle Queen (1945) is a Universal movie serial. This serial was later re-edited into a feature film for television called Jungle Safari (1956).

== Plot ==
In 1939, Nazi Germany sends a team of agents to incite revolt and seize British Middle Africa as a first step in conquering Africa. Attempting to place their own sympathiser in charge of the local tribe, they face resistance from Pamela Courtney searching for her Uncle Allen Courtney, a pair of American volunteers and the mysterious Jungle Queen Lothel, who appears out of nowhere in her nightgown to give advice and instructions to the tribe.

== Cast ==
- Edward Norris as Bob Elliot
- Eddie Quillan as Chuck Kelly
- Douglass Dumbrille as Lang, the Nazi villain
- Lois Collier as Pamela Courtney
- Ruth Roman as Lothel, Jungle Queen
- Tala Birell as Dr. Elise Bork
- Clarence Muse as Kyba
- Cy Kendall as Tambosa Tim
- Clinton Rosemond as Godac
- Lumsden Hare as Mr X
- Lester Matthews as Commissioner Braham Chatterton
- Napoleon Simpson as Maati
- Budd Buster as Jungle Jack
- Emmett Smith as Noma
- James Baskett as Orbon

== Critical reception ==
Cline writes that "although well produced, it often became bogged down with complicated plot twists, psychological debates and confusion as to who was on whose side, and what was really being accomplished." The Jungle Queen herself is never adequately explained.

== Chapter titles ==
1. Invitation to Danger
2. Jungle Sacrifice
3. The Flaming Mountain
4. Wildcat Stampede
5. The Burning Jungle
6. Danger Ship
7. Trip-wire Murder
8. The Mortar Bomb
9. Death Watch
10. Execution Chamber
11. The Trail of Doom
12. Dragged Under
13. The Secret of the Sword!

_{Source:}

== Production ==
The serial reuses aircraft footage from Five Came Back (1939) as well as volcano and crocodile attack footage from East of Borneo (1931).

== See also ==
- List of film serials by year
- List of film serials by studio

Preceded by Mystery of the River Boat (1944)	Universal Serial; Jungle Queen (1945)	Succeeded by The Master Key (1945)
