= Gang War (1940 film) =

1940 film directed by Leo C. Popkin

Gang War is an American film released in 1940. It features an African American cast and was directed by Leo C. Popkin. It was produced by Million Dollar Productions. The film is about the rivalry between two gangs.

In 1998, the Turner Classic Movies (TCM) television channel screened the film as part of a month-long showing of race films.

== Cast ==
- Ralph Cooper as Bob "Killer" Meade
- Gladys Snyder as Mazie "Sugar" Walford
- Reggie Fenderson as Danny
- Lawrence Criner as Lew Baron
- Monte Hawley as Bill
- Jesse Brooks
- Johnny Thomas
- Maceo Sheffield (Maceo Bruce Sheffield)
- Charles Hawkins
- Robert Johnson
- Henry Roberts
- Harold Garrison
