= No Man of Her Own (1932 film) =

1932 film

- Theatrical poster
- Directed by: Wesley Ruggles
- Written by: Milton Herbert Gropper; Maurine Dallas Watkins
- Story by: Benjamin Glazer; Edmund Goulding
- Based on: No Bed of Her Own; 1931 novel by Val Lewton (uncredited)
- Produced by: Albert Lewis
- Starring: Clark Gable; Carole Lombard
- Cinematography: Leo Tover
- Edited by: Otho Lovering (uncredited)
- Music by: W. Franke Harling (uncredited)
- Distributed by: Paramount Pictures
- Release dates: December 15, 1932 (New York City); December 30, 1932 (U.S.)
- Running time: 85 minutes
- Country: United States
- Language: English

No Man of Her Own is a 1932 American pre-Code romantic comedy-drama film starring Clark Gable and Carole Lombard as a married couple in their only film together, several years before their own legendary marriage in real life. The film was directed by Wesley Ruggles, and originated as an adaptation of No Bed of Her Own, a 1931 novel by Val Lewton, but ended up based more on a story by Benjamin Glazer and Edmund Goulding, although it retained the title from Lewton's novel. It is not related to the 1950 film of the same name.

Released just three years after the stock market crash of 1929, the plot focuses on a card sharp and gambling cheat and the street-wise librarian with whom he develops a relationship. Prevalent themes throughout the story include crime, gambling, dishonesty, love, commitment and redemption.

== Plot ==
Card sharp Jerry "Babe" Stewart and his cronies, Kay Everly, Charlie Vane, and Vargas, cheat an unsuspecting Mr Morton at poker. Afterward, when Babe breaks up with his girlfriend Kay, she threatens to turn him in to the police, but he is not worried. Police officer "Dickie" Collins, who has been following Babe, then drops in to inform him that he has told Morton the truth. Worried, Babe decides to leave New York City for a while. He chooses the small town of Glendale, purely by chance.

There he meets librarian Connie Randall, who is bored to death of Glendale, and tries to get better acquainted with her. She plays hard to get, figuring it is the best way to interest someone as experienced as Babe, but finds it difficult to hide her attraction to him. When he is ready to return to New York, she appeals to the gambler in him, getting him to flip a coin to decide whether or not to get married. The coin comes up tails, and they do get married.

Babe continues his cheating ways, while letting Connie think that he has a regular job. To fill the daytime hours when he is supposedly at his job, he persuades a stock broker friend to let him work as his assistant. He turns out to be good at it. Connie does not suspect anything until she sees Babe hide a stacked deck of cards in a secret compartment in the side of their card table prior to a fixed game one evening. She shuffles the cards and puts them back without anybody noticing. Babe and his confederates lose thousands of dollars as a result.

Afterwards, Babe is surprised when Connie is willing to stay with him, even knowing what he does for a living. He decides to take a trip to South America with Vane and Vargas, but without her. At the last minute, he realizes that he loves her, so he does not board the ship. Instead, he tells Collins to charge him with something, and, in return for a confession, he will serve 90 days in jail to pay for his past misdeeds and "come clean". However, in order to keep Connie from discovering that he is in jail, he gets Vargas to send weekly cablegrams in his name to her from South America.

A pregnant Connie receives a visit from Kay just before Babe's "return" from his travels. Kay starts to tell Connie about her husband's shady past, but is surprised to find that Connie already knows and still loves Babe. After informing Connie that Babe is in jail, Kay gives up trying to get Babe back and wishes Connie luck. When Babe gets out of jail, he purchases some South American "souvenirs", including a caged bird, from a local shop before he comes home to Connie. She asks him to tell her about where he has been. The film ends with Babe describing his fictional voyage to South America.

== Cast ==
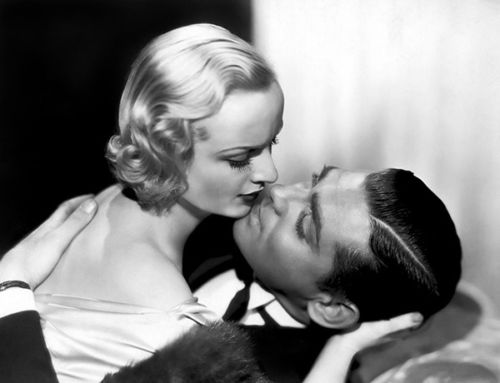
Carole Lombard and Clark Gable in No Man of Her Own

- Clark Gable as Jerry "Babe" Stewart
- Carole Lombard as Connie Randall
- Dorothy Mackaill as Kay Everly
- Grant Mitchell as Charlie Vane
- George Barbier as Mr. Randall
- Elizabeth Patterson as Mrs. Randall
- J. Farrell MacDonald as "Dickie" Collins
- Tommy Conlon as Willie Randall
- Walter Walker as Mr. Morton
- Paul Ellis as Vargas
- Charley Grapewin as George, the clerk
- Oscar Smith as a porter
- Clinton Rosemond as a porter
- Jerry Tucker as little boy in the library (uncredited)

== Production ==
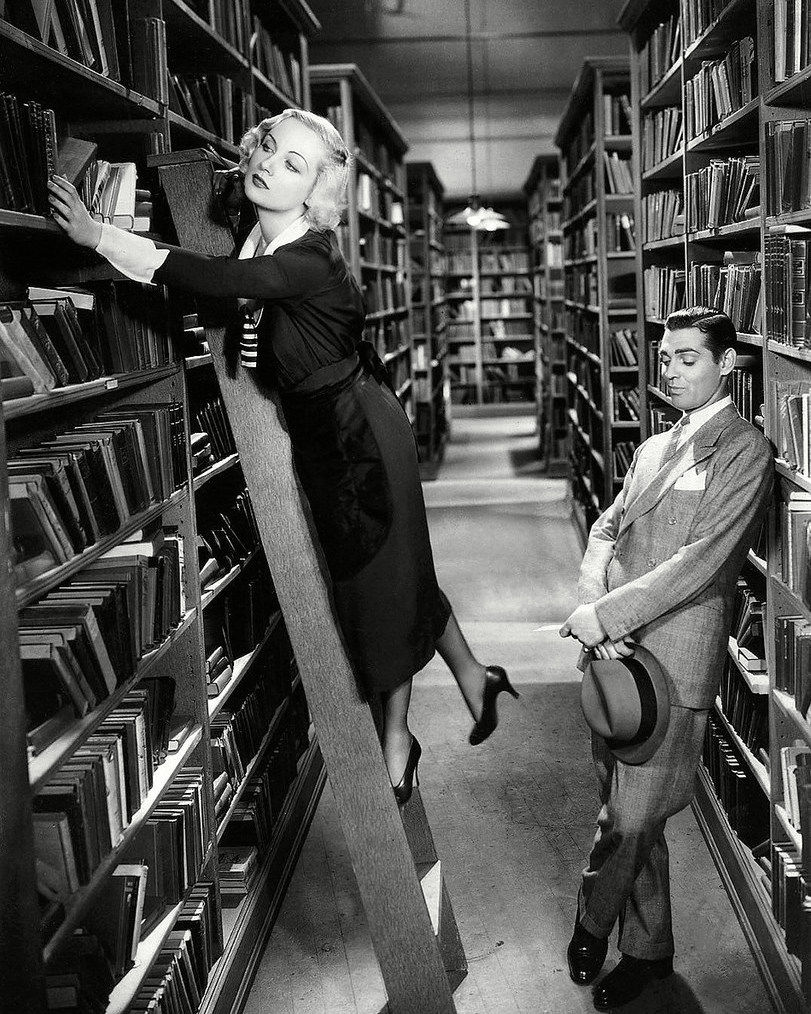
Lombard and Gable in No Man of Her Own

Marion Davies was ultimately responsible for this film being made, as she encouraged MGM to make a trade of Gable for Bing Crosby, who was the only person she wanted for her next project, which became Going Hollywood (1933). Multi-millionaire William Randolph Hearst, Davies' love interest and her partner in a production company, convinced MGM's Louis B. Mayer to make the deal, so Gable was sent to Paramount to work on a project of his choice until Crosby was finished with his picture with Davies. Gable looked over the available properties, and the only one that interested him was the script for No Man of Her Own, which had originally been slated for George Raft.

The original treatment of Val Lewton's 1932 novel No Bed of Her Own, which was the early working title for the film as well, was written by Austin Parker, who also wrote the first screenplay. Because of concerns expressed by the censors at the Hays Office, in August 1932, Paramount purchased another story, "Here Is My Heart" (not the same as the 1934 Bing Crosby film, also released by Paramount), to use to soften the piece. The film was originally to have been directed by James Flood.

Miriam Hopkins was originally offered the lead, but balked at the idea of Gable receiving top billing, and demanded another project. Lombard, who was a rising star on the Paramount lot, but still relegated to roles in which she was second-billed to her male counterparts, was chosen to replace Hopkins.

During filming, Gable and Lombard were entirely indifferent to one another, with Lombard in a foul mood due to her recent unpleasant loan-out to United Artists. She spoke of that experience with her usual colorful vocabulary, which Gable was not certain he approved of. No romantic relationship between the stars came about during the making of this picture, with Lombard still married to actor William Powell and still very much in love. While Gable was still married to socialite Rhea Langham, he could not say that he was in love, but he was certainly not interested in Lombard. He was not so distant from Lombard, however, that he did not give her a nickname, calling her "Ma", as his character did in the film. Lombard retaliated by calling him "Pa."

On the last day of filming, Gable presented Lombard with a pair of ballerina slippers with a card attached that said, "To a true primadonna." Lombard got him back when she presented him with a large ham with his picture on it. Gable kissed her goodbye and they did not stay in touch, as Gable found Lombard to be bawdier than he was willing to handle, and Lombard found Gable to be overly conceited. It was not until four years later that their romance began to take off. Gable and Lombard never appeared together in another film, primarily because they became major stars at different studios, which didn't like to lend them out.
