= Syncopation (1942 film) =

1942 film by William Dieterle

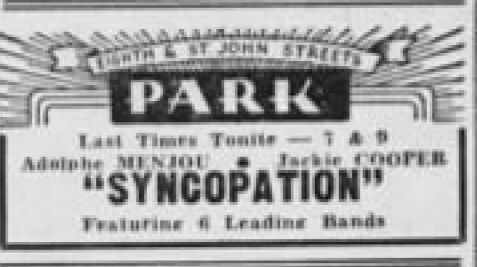
- Newspaper advertisement
- Directed by: William Dieterle
- Screenplay by: Phillip Yordan; Frank Cavett
- Story by: Valentine Davies
- Starring: Adolphe Menjou; Jackie Cooper; Bonita Granville
- Cinematography: J. Roy Hunt
- Edited by: John Sturges
- Music by: Leith Stevens
- Distributed by: RKO Radio Pictures
- Release date: May 22, 1942 (U.S.)
- Running time: 88 minutes
- Country: United States
- Language: English

Syncopation is a 1942 American film from RKO directed by William Dieterle and starring Adolphe Menjou, Jackie Cooper, and Bonita Granville. It is set during the early days of jazz. It is also known as The Band Played On.

== Plot ==
In 1906, the Congo Square Building in New Orleans, which was previously used as a slave market, is transformed into an African-American unemployment bureau. Close by there is also an African-American musical college, where little Reggie Tearbone, seven years old, is learning to play Bach on his cornet. He has trouble following the sheet and starts improvising. It begins to sound more like a jazz piece.

Reggie's mother Ella works as a housekeeper for architect George Latimer. The Latimers are an old aristocratic family who have started to get financial problems. Because of this, when George's old friend Steve Porter come to visit, he offers the Latimer family, including George's daughter Kit and Ella, to return to Chicago with him.

The whole family go to Chicago, but Reggie stays behind, having gotten a permanent spot in King Jeffers' Basin Street Band.

Ten years later, Kit turns seventeen, and is left alone by both the Latimers and the Porters, who are out entertaining a client. Ragtime has developed from the regular jazz, and Kit meets the young street musician Johnny Schumacher when she is out walking alone.

The two youngsters go to a party at a musical promoter, and Kit plays the piano in a new style, leading to her arrest. She gets off by playing the boogie-woogie to the jury.

Then comes World War I and changes everything, making the King Jeffers' Basin Street Band stop playing. Reggie, now known as "Rex Tearbone" and "King of the Cornet", goes to Chicago to continue his career.

Steve's son Paul and Kit are now engaged to be married, but Paul is forced out in the war. He is killed in battle. Soon, Johnny and Kit fall in love with each other and become sweethearts. When the war ends they marry. Johnny gets a job with a big jazz orchestra traveling around, playing the cornet, but Kit does not want to join him on the road. Tired of not getting his place in the spotlight, Johnny soon quits the band and starts looking for true inspiration as a hobo.

After a while, Johnny is contacted by the music promoter whose party he once attended, and is offered to come to New York. Kit has started working for the promoter, and they reunite in New York. Johnny gets to play in a new band and gets a few good gigs with the help of his promoter.

After a slow start for the new band and its "innovative" sound, the audience realize that it is great for dancing. The new sound is named "swing" and it revolutionizes jazz music completely.

== Cast ==
- Adolphe Menjou as George Latimer
- Jackie Cooper as Johnny [Schumacher]
- Bonita Granville as Kit Latimer
- George Bancroft as Mr. [Steve] Porter
- Robert Benchley as Doakes
- Walter Catlett as Spelvin
- Ted North as Paul Porter
- Todd Duncan as Rex Tearbone
- Connie Boswell as herself (Café singer)
- Frank Jenks as Smiley Jackson
- Jessie Grayson as Ella [Tearbone]
- Mona Barrie as Lillian
- Lindy Wade as Paul Porter as a child
- Peggy McIntyre as Kit Latimer as a child
- Charlie Barnet as himself
- Benny Goodman as himself
- Harry James as himself
- Jack Jenney as himself
- Gene Krupa as himself
- Alvino Rey as himself
- Joe Venuti as himself
- Emory Parnell as Judge

Jack Thompson as Rex Tearbone as a child.

== Reception ==
The film recorded a loss at the box office of $87,000.
