= Ralph Cooper =

American actor, screenwriter, dancer and choreographer (1908–1992)

- Cooper in The Duke Is Tops, 1938
- Born: January 16, 1908; Harlem, New York City, U.S.
- Died: August 4, 1992 (aged 84); New York City, U.S.
- Resting place: Woodlawn Cemetery, Bronx, New York
- Other names: The Dark Gable; Bronze Bogart
- Education: New York University (attended)
- Occupations: Actor; dancer; screenwriter; emcee; choreographer
- Years active: 1927–1992
- Known for: Founder of the Apollo Theater's Amateur Night (1935)
- Spouse: Elizabeth (Betti Mays) Cooper (m. 1945)
- Children: 2

Ralph Cooper (January 16, 1908 – August 4, 1992) was an American actor, screenwriter, dancer and choreographer. Cooper is best known as the original master of ceremonies and founder of amateur night at the Apollo Theater in Harlem, New York City, in 1935. He wrote, produced, directed and acted in ten motion pictures. Titles include The Duke Is Tops, Dark Manhattan, Gangsters on the Loose and Gang War. Because of his debonair good looks, he was known as "dark Gable" in the 1930s.

== Biography ==
Cooper was born on January 16, 1908, in Harlem, New York City. He worked as a dancer in small downtown clubs near New York University, which he attended with plans of becoming a medical doctor. In July 1935, Cooper began the Apollo's Amateur Night which ran every Wednesday night. In 1937, Cooper formed Cooper-Randol Productions with black actor George Randol and soon afterwards Million Dollar Productions with white producers Harry Popkin and his brother Leo Popkin to produce race films that he often starred in, wrote, produced and directed. Tino Balio has written that: "Million Dollar, more than any other company, moved black filmmaking away from a marginalized form towards the mainstream, advancing considerably its reputation and ability to attract audiences." In 1963, after the March On Washington, he would narrate an album with the namesake. The full name of the album was The March On Washington (A Chronological History Of Negro Contributions). It was released the same year as the march, and reached No. 102 in the US.

== Later life and death ==
The Apollo closed in the mid-1970s, but the contest was restarted in 1985 after the renovations were completed. Cooper was again the master of ceremonies. His son, Ralph Cooper II, took over the show after his father was hospitalized with cancer in late–1986. He died on August 4, 1992, from cancer. Cooper is interred in Woodlawn Cemetery in The Bronx, New York City.

== Filmography ==
- Lloyd's of London (1936) (uncredited actor in indeterminate role)
- White Hunter (1937, actor)
- Dark Manhattan (1937, actor, director and producer)
- Bargain with Bullets (1937, actor, story and screenwriter)
- Gang Smashers (1938, story)
- The Duke Is Tops (1938, actor, director and screenwriter)
- Gang War (1940, actor)
- Am I Guilty? (1940, actor)
