= Willie Covan =

American tap dancer, actor and vaudeville performer (1898–1989)

- Born: March 4, 1898; Atlanta, Georgia
- Died: May 7, 1989 (aged 91); Los Angeles, California
- Occupations: Dancer, actor, choreographer
- Years active: 1904 - 1978
- Spouse(s): Anna Lee Hampton (m. 1918; 1923 or later); Florence Byers (m. 1929; died 1978)

William McKinley Covan (March 4, 1898 – May 7, 1989) was an American tap dancer, actor, vaudeville performer best known for being a member of the tap quartet The Four Covans and a choreographer for Metro-Goldwyn-Mayer.

Willie Covan was born on March 4, 1898, in Atlanta, Georgia. Shortly after, his family moved to Chicago. By 1903, Willie was already tapping to the rhythms of the city. When was six years old, he began a six-year career as a pickaninny in the numerous vaudeville shows around the city. There he watched dancers and began to pick up technique from miming them. By age 12, he was tired of pick tapping and started out to make a name for himself in the vaudeville circuit.

Covan got his first big break winning an amateur tap contest around 1910. From that he was taken under the wings of legendary tap dancers "Slow Kid" Thompson, and Leonard Ruffin. In 1927, he formed the tap quartet, The Four Covans. They became an instant sensation in the United States and in Europe.

In the early 1930s, Covan moved to Hollywood where he began working with screen stars such as Shirley Temple, Jeanette MacDonald, Mae West, Mickey Rooney, Gregory Peck, Kirk Douglas and Ann Miller. It was at Eleanor Powell's insistence that Covan had his own bungalow on the MGM lot.

Among the handful of films in which he himself appeared, the one that best showcased Covan's talents is The Duke Is Tops.

While at MGM, he opened his own dance studio in Los Angeles, The Willie Covan Dance Studio, where he and his wife Florence taught for 35 years. Later in life he was seen in films such as The Big Fix and Finian's Rainbow. Covan is most credited for creating many classic tap dance steps, including the Rhythm Waltz Clog, and Around the World. Covan died on May 7, 1989, in his home in Los Angeles and is interred at Inglewood Park Cemetery.

== Filmography ==
Year	Title	Role	Notes
1929	On with the Show!	Specialty Tap Dancers	Uncredited
1929	Fox Movietone Follies of 1929	Specialty Tap Dancers	Uncredited
1938	The Duke Is Tops	Specialty Tap Dancer	
1940	Gang War	Dance Specialty	Uncredited
1968	Finian's Rainbow	Sharecropper	Uncredited
1978	The Big Fix	Elderly Servant	(final film role)
