= George Randol =

American film actor, producer and director (1895–1973)

George Randol (1895–1973) was an actor, screenwriter, director, and producer of films in the United States. In 1938 he was honored as an influential film executive in a newspaper writeup of the "Negro" film industry.

== Life and career ==
Randol was born in Buena Vista, Virginia.

Randol had numerous theatrical roles.

He was a partner in the short-lived Cooper-Randol Production Company of Los Angeles that delivered only Dark Manhattan. He continued on with another partnership.

He was in the Broadway production of Anna Lucasta.

== Filmography ==
=== Actor ===
- The Exile as Bill Prescott
- The Green Pastures (1936) as High Priest
- Harlem on the Prairie (1937) as Sheriff

=== Producer ===
- Dark Manhattan (1937, executive producer)
- Double Deal (1939)
- Midnight Shadow (1939)

=== Director ===
- Midnight Shadow (1939)
