= Dark Manhattan =

1937 American film

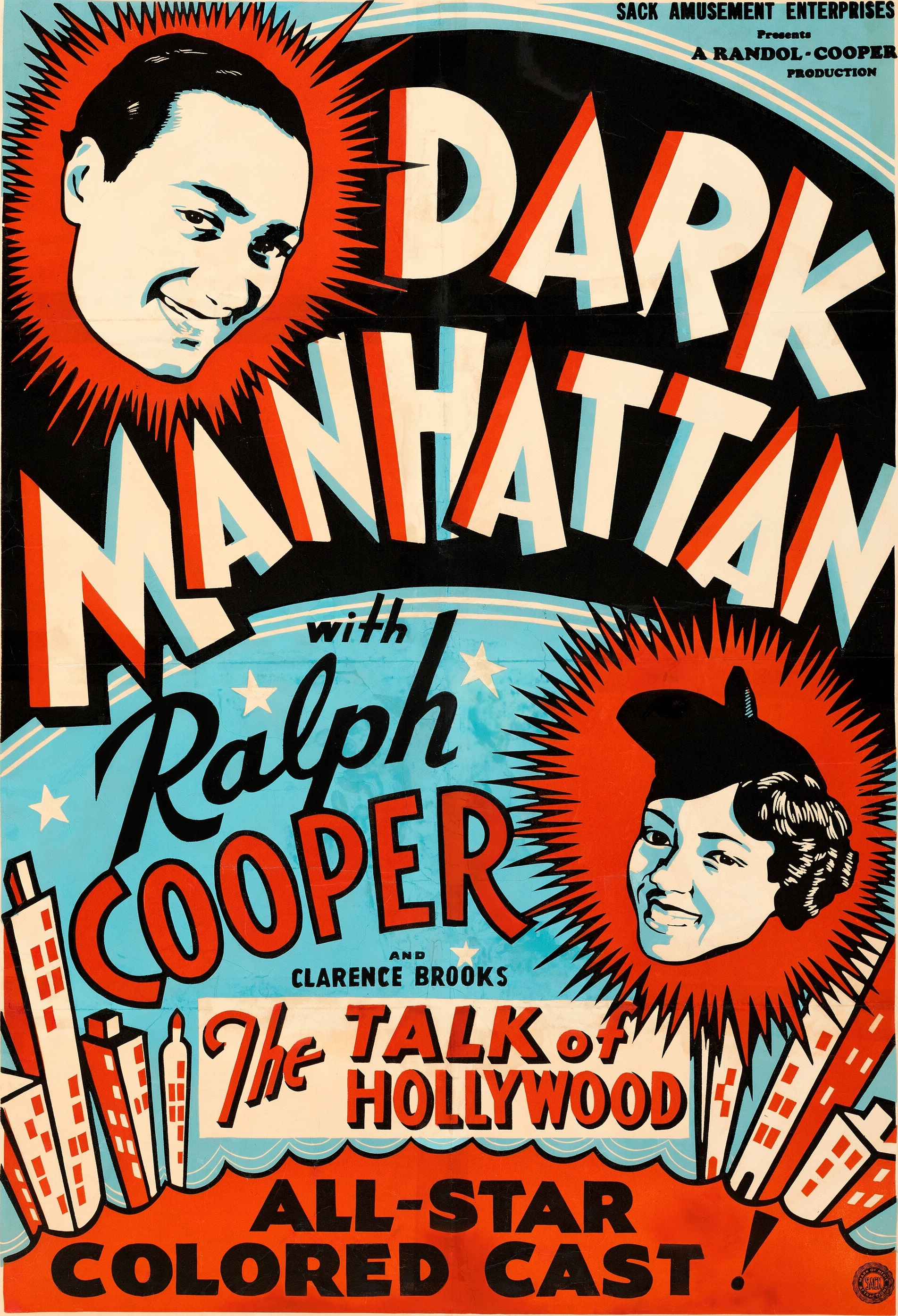
- Directed by: Harry Fraser
- Written by: George Randol
- Produced by: Ralph Cooper; George Randol
- Starring: Ralph Cooper
- Cinematography: Arthur Reed
- Edited by: Arthur A. Brooks
- Music by: Ben Ellison; Harvey O. Brooks
- Production company: Randol-Cooper Productions
- Release date: January 19, 1937
- Running time: 69 minutes
- Country: United States
- Language: English

The film Dark Manhattan

Dark Manhattan is a black and white American film produced in 1937 by a partnership of African Americans Ralph Cooper and George Randol. Harry Fraser directed the film, which was written by Randol who was also the executive producer. The film was the only one made by Randol-Cooper Productions.

The film opens with a dedication to R. B. Harrison, Bert Williams, and Florence Mills "and all the pioneer Negro actors who by their many sacrifices paved the way for this presentation."

Music was by Ellison & Brooks (Ben Ellison and Harvey O. Brooks). Ben Rinaldo was associate producer.

The film had its world premiere on January 19, 1937, at the Lincoln Theater, in the heart of L.A.'s Central Avenue Corridor.

The film is discussed in the book Making a Promised Land.

== Plot ==
An up-and-coming youngster ruthlessly takes control of the numbers racket from the ailing former boss.

== Cast ==
- Ralph Cooper as Curly Thorpe
- Cleo Herndon as Flo Gray
- Clarence Brooks as Larry Lee
- Jess Lee Brooks as Lieut. Ballot
- Sam McDaniel as Jack Johnson
- Corny Anderson as Atty. Brown
- Rubeline Glover as Miss Hall
- James Adamson as Lem
