= Million Dollar Productions =

Film production company

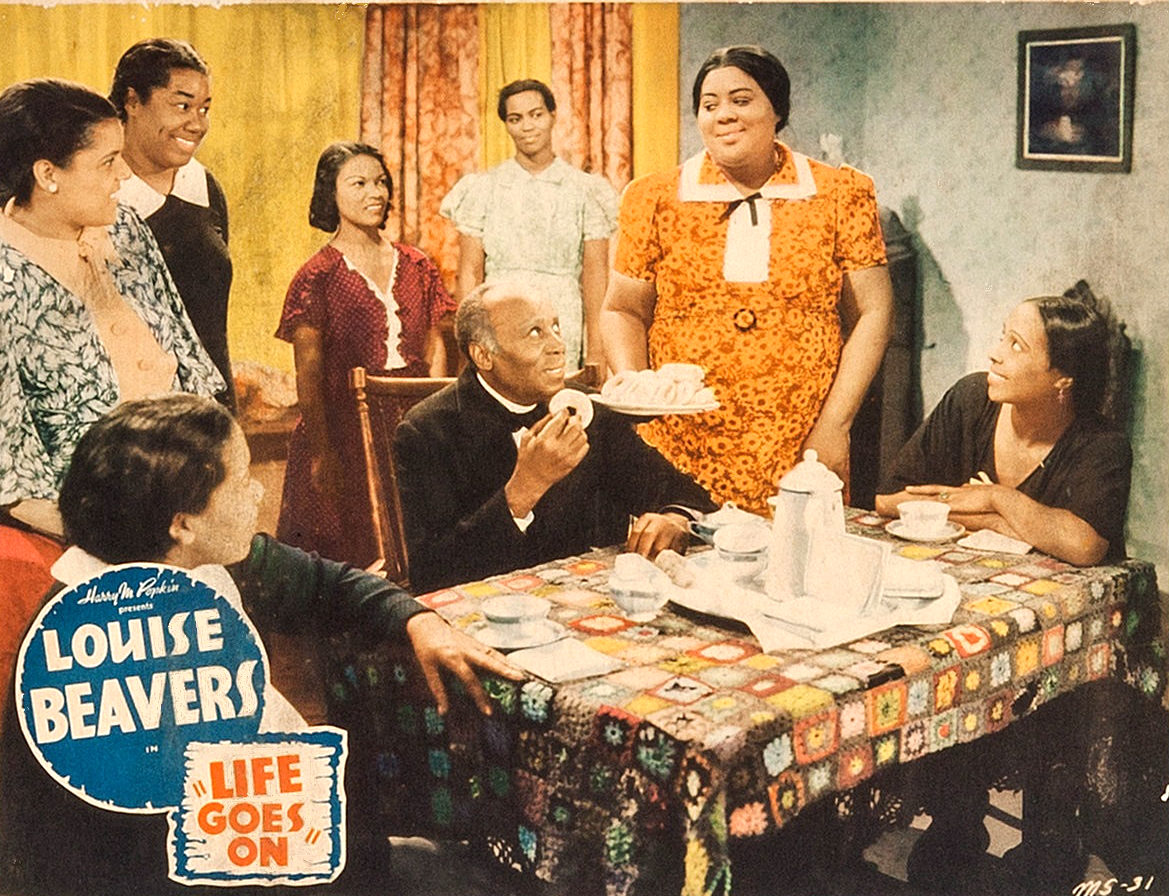
Lobby card for Life Goes On

Million Dollar Productions was a movie studio in the United States active from 1937 until 1940. It was established to produce films with African American casts. It was a partnership between Harry M. Popkin, Leo C. Popkin and Ralph Cooper.

== History ==
Ralph Cooper was an experienced black actor nicknamed "Dark Gable" who was also a singer, dancer, comedian and emcee at the Apollo Theater Amateur Night in Harlem. While contracted to 20th Century Fox, Cooper learned film making skills. Together with George Randol, he formed Cooper-Randol Productions to produce Dark Manhattan (1937). Using the experience he went into partnership with the Popkin brothers, Harry and Leo to form Million Dollar Productions. Harry Popkin owned and managed a chain of Circle Theatres in Los Angeles. One of these was the Million Dollar Theatre that catered to a black clientele.

The production company made several fast moving genre pictures with budgets, despite its name, of approximately $8,000 to $10,000 with the films shot in seven days. Cooper not only starred but wrote and directed several films as well as bringing Lena Horne in to co-star with him. Cooper left the company in 1939, according to one source because he was tired of only making gangster films, with another source feeling he desired the financing and distribution control of the Popkin brothers. In the same year Million Dollar Productions merged with Sack Amusement Enterprises, another film business specializing in race films. It offered better distribution opportunities. Other black stars appearing in Million Dollar Productions were Nina Mae McKinney, Mantan Moreland, Laurence Criner and Louise Beavers. Production ceased at the start of American involvement in World War II.

Following World War II, the Popkin brothers produced several well regarded mainstream Hollywood films such as D.O.A. (1950) and The Well (1951).

News photographer turned film maker Edward Lewis made documentary films such as Life in Harlem and the series' Colored America on Parade and The Colored Champions of Sport for the company.

== Filmography ==
- Bargain with Bullets rereleased as Gangsters on the Loose (1937)
- Life Goes On (1938)
- The Duke Is Tops (1938)
- Gang Smashers (1938)
- Reform School (1939)
- One Dark Night (1939)
- Straight to Heaven (1939)
- Four Shall Die (1940)
- Gang War (1940)
- While Thousands Cheer (1940)
- Colored Americans in the Nation's Capital (short subject, 1942)
