= Dorothy Hall =

Dorothy Hall may refer to:

- Dorothy Hall (actress) (1906–1953), 1920s silent film actress
- Dorothy Manley (1927–2021), 1940s–50s British athlete, sometimes called by her married name "Dorothy Hall"
- Dorothy Hall (scientist), scientist known for her research on snow and ice
- "Dorothy Hall", a historic building at Tuskegee University, Alabama
- Dorothy Hall, Mayor of Cool, Texas.
