= The Broadway Drifter =

1927 film

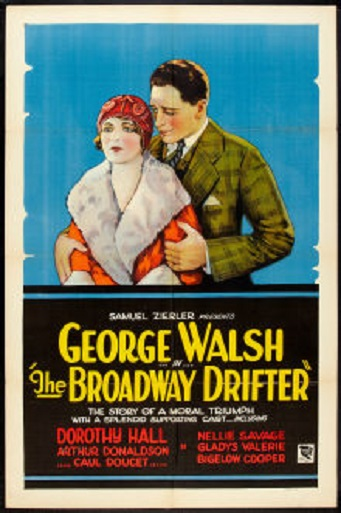
- Film poster
- Directed by: Bernard McEveety
- Written by: William B. Laub
- Produced by: Samuel Zierler
- Starring: George Walsh; Dorothy Hall; Arthur Donaldson
- Cinematography: Marcel Le Picard
- Production company: Excellent Pictures
- Distributed by: Excellent Pictures
- Release date: April 1, 1927
- Running time: 60 minutes
- Country: United States
- Language: Silent (English intertitles)

The Broadway Drifter is a 1927 American silent drama film directed by Bernard McEveety and starring George Walsh, Dorothy Hall, and Arthur Donaldson.

== Synopsis ==
A drifter who hangs around Broadway is disowned by his father. He tries to reform and find employment running a health institution for girls and later working at an airplane factory.

== Cast ==
- George Walsh as Bob Stafford
- Dorothy Hall as Eileen Byrne
- Bigelow Cooper as Myron Stafford
- Arthur Donaldson as Frank Harmon
- Paul Doucet as Phil Winston
- Nellie Savage as Mignon Renee
- Gladys Valerie as Laura Morris
- Donald Laskley as Sam
- George Offerman Jr. as Tommy

== Preservation ==
A print of The Broadway Drifter is held in the Library and Archives Canada.

== Bibliography ==
- Munden, Kenneth White. The American Film Institute Catalog of Motion Pictures Produced in the United States, Part 1. University of California Press, 1997.
