= The Winning Oar =

1927 film

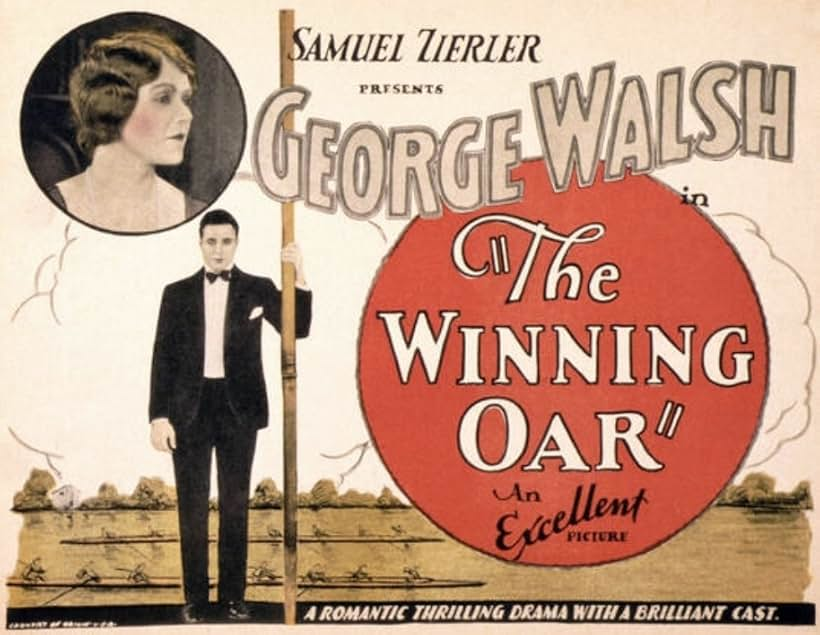
- Directed by: Bernard McEveety
- Written by: Arthur Hoerl
- Produced by: Samuel Zierler
- Starring: George Walsh; Dorothy Hall; Arthur Donaldson
- Cinematography: Marcel Le Picard
- Production company: Excellent Pictures
- Distributed by: Excellent Pictures
- Release date: May 1, 1927
- Running time: 60 minutes
- Country: United States
- Languages: Silent; English intertitles

The Winning Oar is a 1927 American silent drama film directed by Bernard McEveety and starring George Walsh, Dorothy Hall and Arthur Donaldson.

== Cast ==
- George Walsh as Ted Scott
- Dorothy Hall as Gloria Brooks
- William Cain as Fred Blake
- Arthur Donaldson as Robert Brooks
- Harry Southard as Stanley Wharton
- Gladys Frazin as Valerie

== Bibliography ==
- Munden, Kenneth White. The American Film Institute Catalog of Motion Pictures Produced in the United States, Part 1. University of California Press, 1997.
