= Inspiration (1928 film) =

1928 film

- Directed by: Bernard McEveety
- Written by: Harry Chandlee; Arthur Hoerl
- Produced by: Samuel Zierler
- Starring: George Walsh; Gladys Frazin; Marguerite Clayton
- Cinematography: Marcel Le Picard
- Production company: Excellent Pictures
- Distributed by: Excellent Pictures
- Release date: May 10, 1928
- Running time: 75 minutes
- Country: United States
- Languages: Silent; English intertitles

Inspiration is a 1928 American silent drama film directed by Bernard McEveety and starring George Walsh, Gladys Frazin and Marguerite Clayton. It is also known by the alternative title of Love's Test.

== Synopsis ==
When he is falsely accused of having fathered a child with another woman, a man is abandoned by his fiancée and disinherited by his father. He leaves for China. There he meets a dancer, Carlita, who persuades him to return home and establish the truth, despite the fact she herself loves him.

== Cast ==
- George Walsh as Gerald Erskine
- Gladys Frazin as Carlita
- Marguerite Clayton as Mary Keith
- Earle Larrimore as Jimmie
- Bradley Barker as George Gordon
- Ali Yousoff as Pietro
- John Costello as Capt. Broady
- Buddy Harris as Bobby
- Bernice Vert as Anna Martin

== Bibliography ==
- Munden, Kenneth White. The American Film Institute Catalog of Motion Pictures Produced in the United States, Part 1. University of California Press, 1997.
