= Back to Liberty =

Lost 1927 American silent mystery film

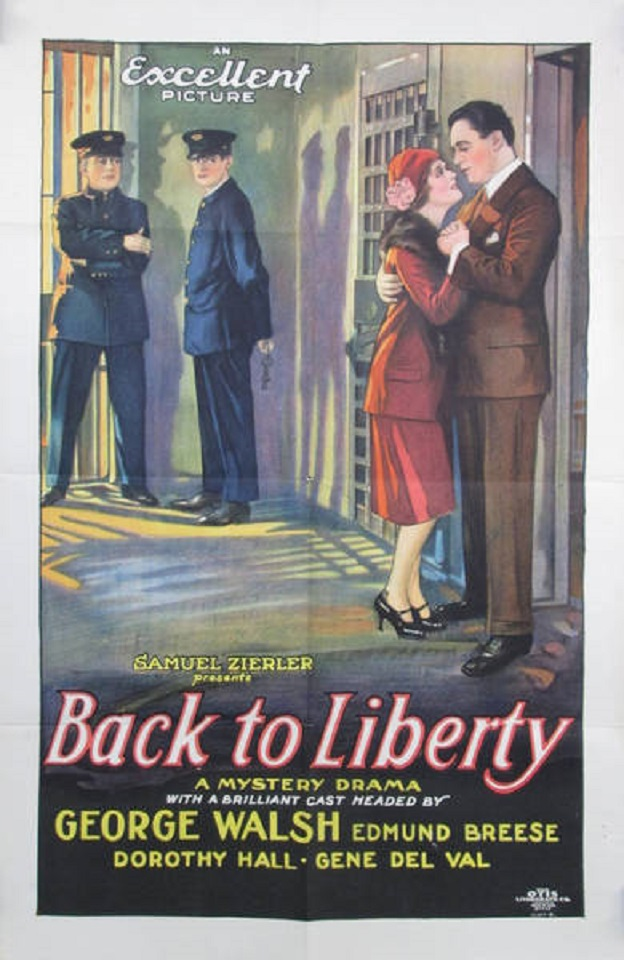
- Directed by: Bernard McEveety
- Written by: Arthur Hoerl; Harry Chandlee
- Produced by: Samuel Zierler
- Starring: George Walsh; Edmund Breese; Dorothy Hall
- Cinematography: Marcel Le Picard
- Production company: Excellent Pictures
- Distributed by: Excellent Pictures
- Release date: November 15, 1927
- Running time: 60 minutes
- Country: United States
- Languages: Silent; English intertitles

Back to Liberty is a lost 1927 American silent mystery film, directed by Bernard McEveety and starring George Walsh, Edmund Breese and Dorothy Hall.

== Cast ==
- George Walsh as Jimmy Stevens
- Edmund Breese as Tom Devon / Reginald Briand
- Dorothy Hall as Floria Briand
- Jean Del Val as Rudolph Gambier
- De Sacia Mooers as Nina Burke

== Preservation ==
With no holdings located in archives, Back to Liberty is considered lost.

== Bibliography ==
- Munden, Kenneth White. The American Film Institute Catalog of Motion Pictures Produced in the United States, Part 1. University of California Press, 1997.
