= Serenade (1921 film) =

1921 film by Raoul Walsh

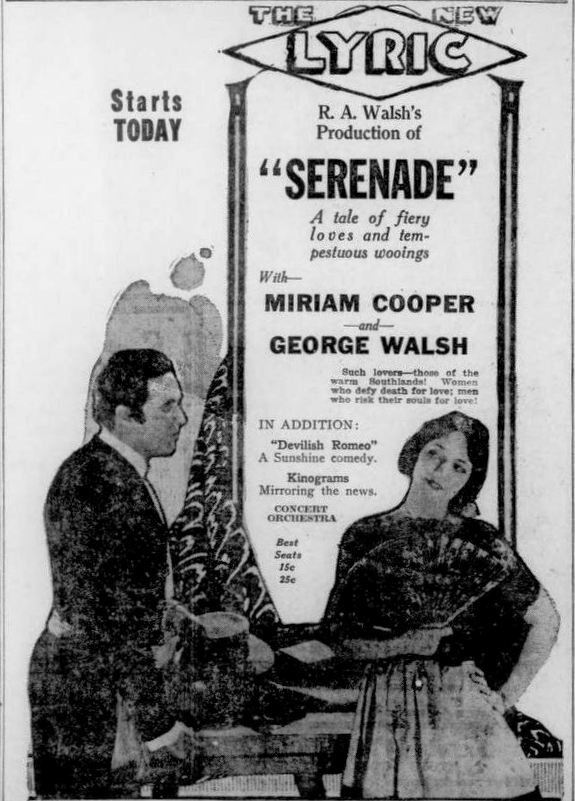
- Advertisement for the film
- Directed by: Raoul Walsh
- Written by: James T. O'Donohoe; Raoul Walsh
- Based on: Maria del Carmen by Josep Feliu i Codina
- Produced by: Raoul Walsh
- Starring: Miriam Cooper; George Walsh; Rosita Marstini
- Cinematography: George Peters
- Production company: R. A. Walsh Productions
- Distributed by: Associated First National Pictures
- Release date: August 1921
- Running time: 7 reels
- Country: United States
- Language: Silent (English [[intertitle]]s)

Serenade is a 1921 American film directed by Raoul Walsh. James T. O’Donohue adapted the screenplay from the short story “María del Carmen” by Josep Feliu i Codina. George Peters was the cinematographer. A romantic adventure, it is set in a Spanish town.

It was an Associated First National release. Some of its scenes were filmed at the Brunton lot.

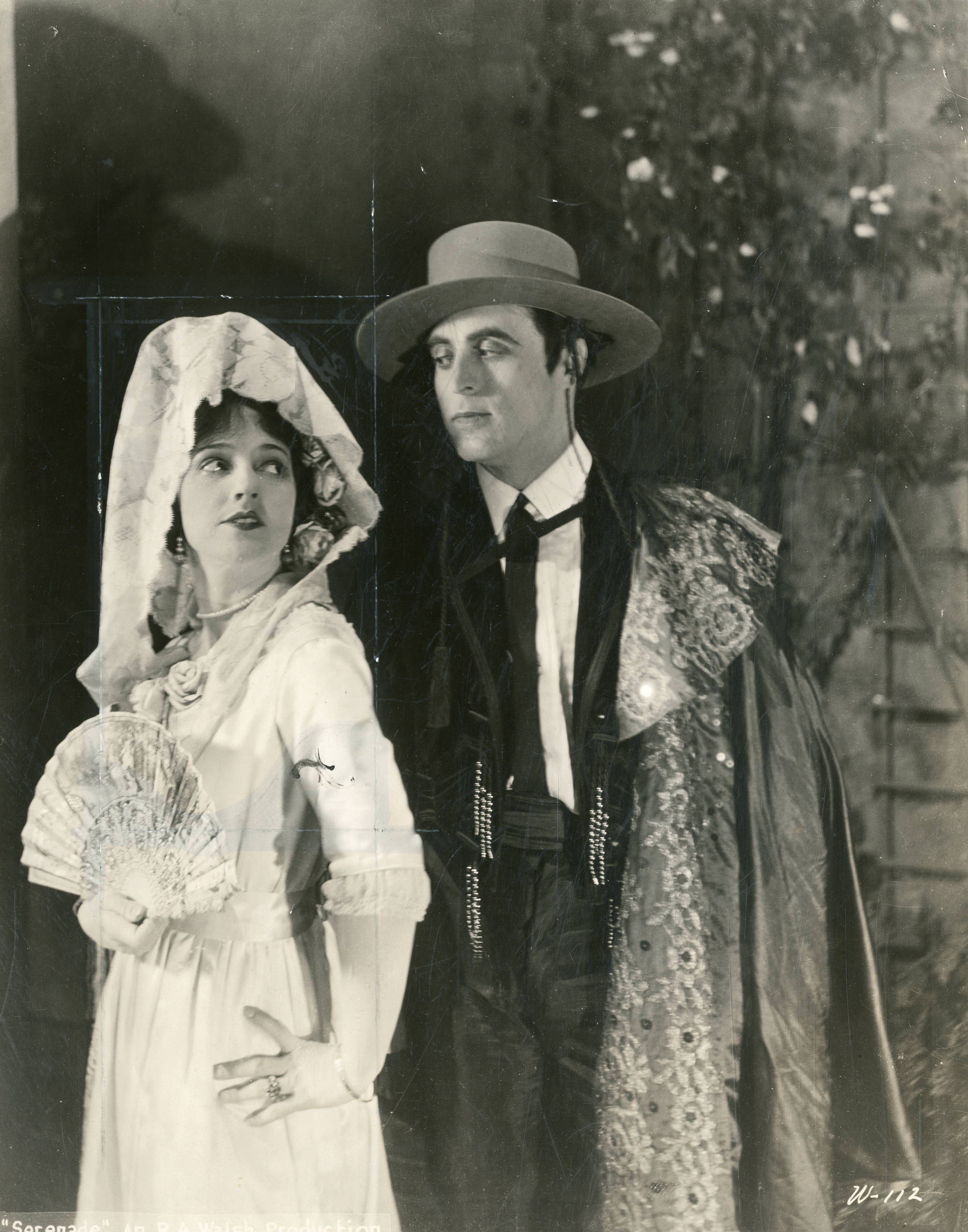

== Cast ==
- Miriam Cooper as María del Carmen
- George Walsh as Pancho
- Rosita Marstini as Maria’s mother
- James A. Marcus as Pepuso
- Josef Swickard as Domingo Maticas
- Bertram Grassby as Ramón Maticas]
- Noble Johnson as Capitan Ramírez
- Adelbert Knott as Don Fulgencio
- William Eagle Eye as Juan
- Ardita Milano as the dancer
- Peter Venzuela as Pedro
- John Eberts as The secretary
- Tom Kennedy as Zambrano
