= I'll Say So =

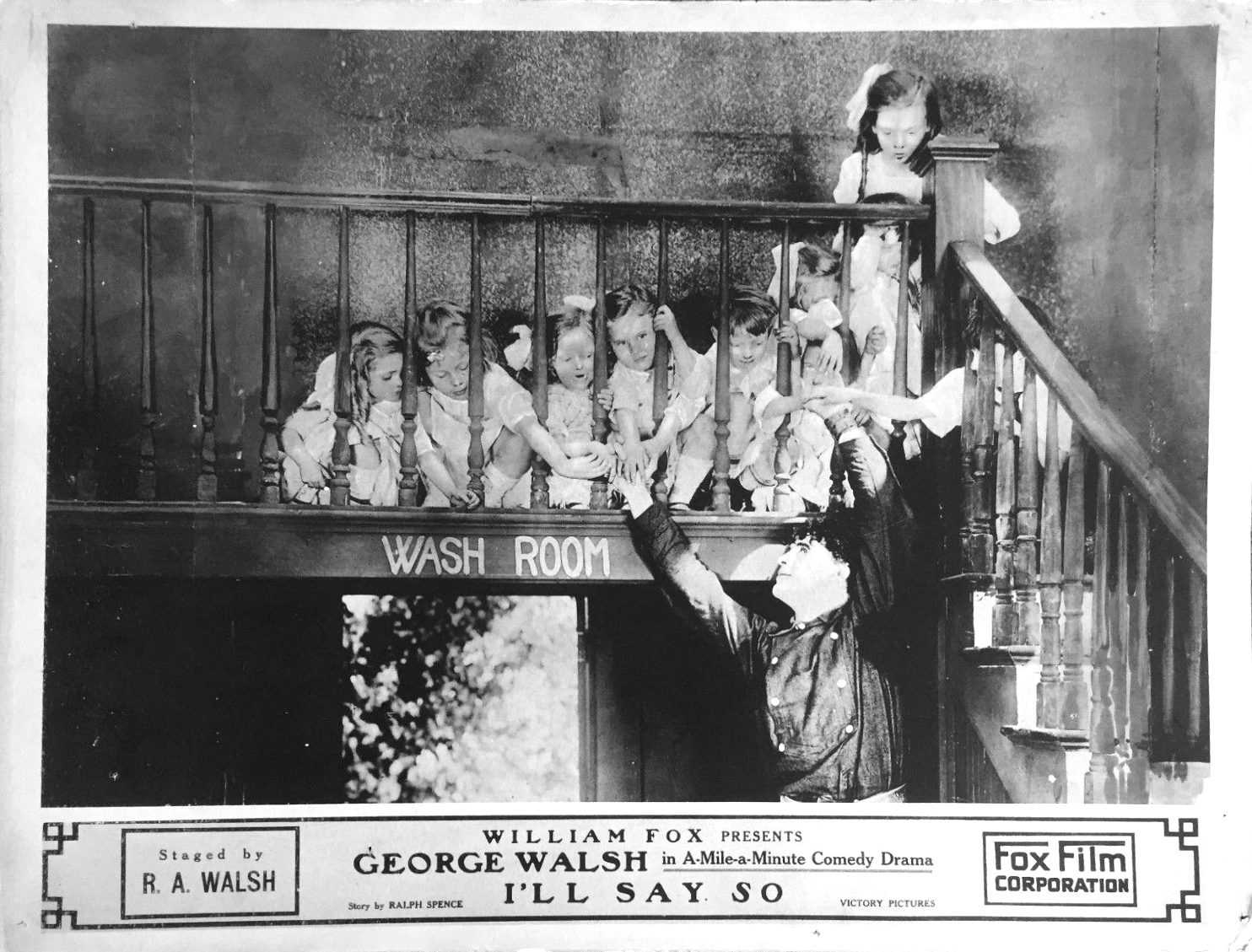
- lobby card
- Directed by: Raoul Walsh
- Written by: Ralph Spence
- Produced by: William Fox
- Starring: George Walsh; Regina Quinn
- Edited by: Ralph Spence
- Distributed by: Fox Film(Fox Victory)
- Release date: December 22, 1918
- Running time: 5 reels
- Country: USA
- Languages: Silent; English

I'll Say So is a lost 1918 silent war comedy film directed by Raoul Walsh and starring his brother George Walsh. It was produced and distributed by Fox Film.

== Cast ==
- George Walsh - Bill Durham
- Regina Quinn - Barbara Knowles
- William Norton Bailey - August Myers (*William Bailey)
- James Black - Carl Vogel
- Ed Keeley - Judge
- May McAvoy - ?unknown role

== See also ==
- 1937 Fox vault fire
