= On the Jump (1918 Fox film) =

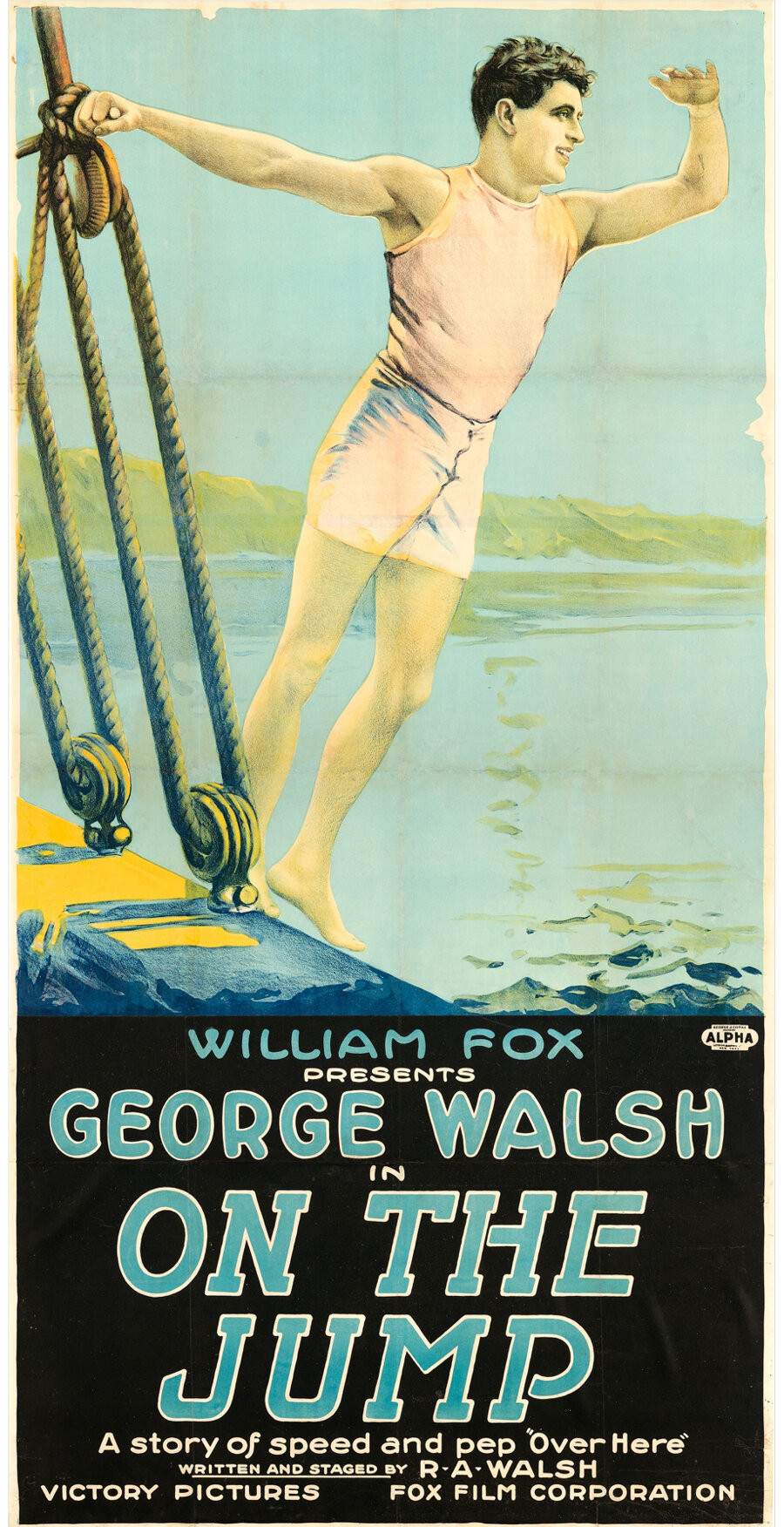
- Directed by: Raoul Walsh
- Written by: Ralph Spence; Raoul Walsh
- Produced by: William Fox
- Starring: George Walsh; Frances Burnham; James A. Marcus
- Cinematography: Roy F. Overbaugh
- Production company: Fox Film
- Distributed by: Fox Film
- Release date: March 31, 1918
- Running time: 60 minutes
- Country: United States
- Languages: Silent; English intertitles

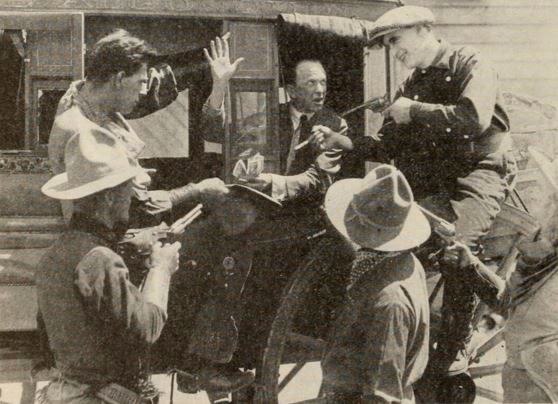
Scene from the film

On the Jump is a 1918 American silent comedy film directed by Raoul Walsh and starring George Walsh, Frances Burnham and James A. Marcus.

== Plot ==
A journalist resigns from a newspaper when it is taken over by a pro-German sympathizer, and sets out to expose him as a German agent.

== Cast ==
- George Walsh as Jack Bartlett
- Frances Burnham as Margaret Desmond
- James A. Marcus as William Desmond
- Henry Clive as Otto Crumley
- Ralph Faulkner as President Woodrow Wilson

== Bibliography ==
- Solomon, Aubrey. The Fox Film Corporation, 1915-1935: A History and Filmography. McFarland, 2011.
