= James Marcus (American actor) =

American actor (1867–1937)

James A. Marcus
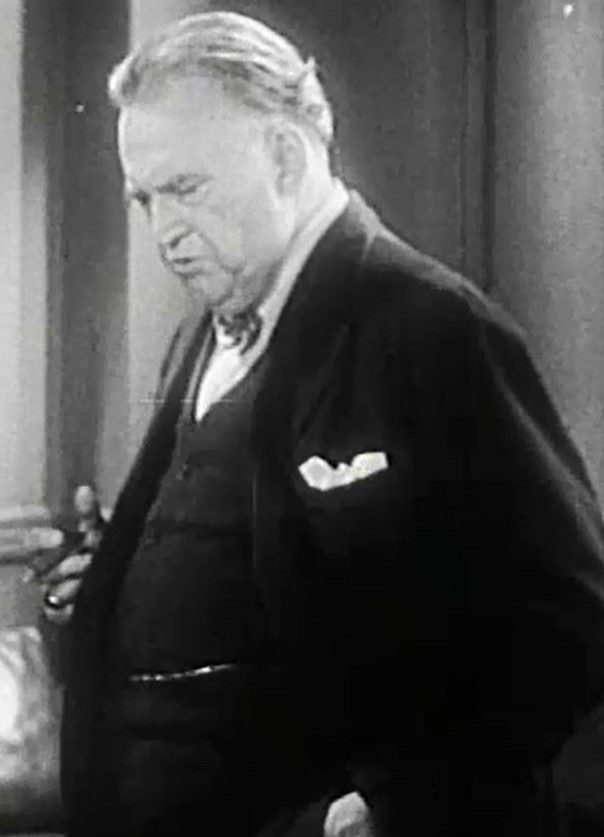
- Marcus in Hell's House (1932).
- Born: January 21, 1867; New York City, U.S.
- Died: October 15, 1937 (aged 70); Hollywood, California, U.S.
- Occupation: Actor
- Years active: 1915–1937

James A. Marcus (January 21, 1867 – October 15, 1937) was an American actor. He appeared in more than 100 films between 1915 and 1937. He was born in New York City. On October 15, 1937, Marcus died in Hollywood, California from a heart attack at age 70. Marcus' most notable films include Regeneration, Oliver Twist and Sadie Thompson.

== Partial filmography ==
- Regeneration (1915)
- Carmen (1915)
- Blue Blood and Red (1916)
- The Serpent (1916)
- The Honor System (1917)
- Betrayed (1917)
- The Conqueror (1917)
- The Pride of New York (1917)
- The Prussian Cur (1918)
- On the Jump (1918)
- Evangeline (1919) – Basil
- The Strongest (1920)
- Serenade (1921)
- Oliver Twist (1922)
- The Strangers' Banquet (1922)
- Come on Over (1922) as Carmody
- Beau Brummel (1924)
- The Iron Horse (1924)
- Dick Turpin (1925)
- The Goose Hangs High (1925)
- Lightnin' (1925)
- The Fighting Heart (1925)
- The Eagle (1925)
- All Around Frying Pan (1925)
- The Love Gamble (1925)
- The Scarlet Letter (1926)
- The Texas Streak (1926)
- Siberia (1926)
- The Eagle of the Sea (1926)
- The Traffic Cop (1926)
- The Bachelor's Baby (1927)
- Duck Soup (1927)
- The Meddlin' Stranger (1927)
- Life of an Actress (1927)
- The Beauty Shoppers (1927)
- Sadie Thompson (1928)
- Isle of Lost Men (1928)
- The Broken Mask (1928)
- Buck Privates (1928)
- The Border Patrol (1928)
- Revenge (1928)
- Whispering Winds (1929)
- Captain of the Guard (1930)
- Back Pay (1930)
- Liliom (1930)
- Fighting Caravans (1931)
- Hell's House (1932)
- The Man from Arizona (1932)
- Strawberry Roan (1933)
- The Trail Beyond (1934)
- Red Morning (1934)
- The Lonely Trail (1936)
