= The Shark (1920 film) =

1920 film directed by Dell Henderson

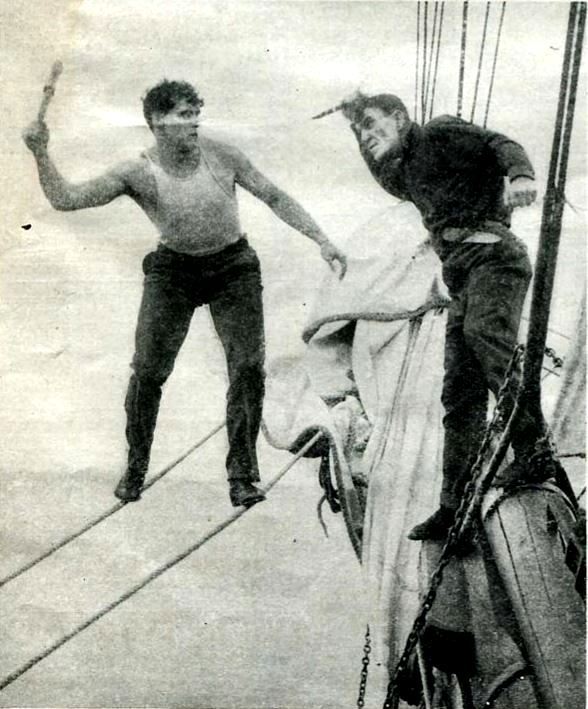
- Film still with George Walsh and William Nally
- Directed by: Dell Henderson; John J. Foley
- Written by: Thomas F. Fallon (story, scenario)
- Produced by: William Fox
- Starring: George Walsh
- Cinematography: Joseph Ruttenberg
- Distributed by: Fox Film Corporation
- Release date: January 1920
- Running time: 5 reels
- Country: United States
- Language: Silent (English intertitles)

The Shark is a lost 1920 American silent film produced and distributed by Fox Film Corporation. It was directed by Dell Henderson and starred George Walsh.

== Plot ==
Shark Rawley is a sailor on a tramp steamer who saves a woman by the name of Doris Hall from the crew of the ship and its captain Sanchez. His adventures lead to the ship burning when a fire breaks out. Rawley and Hall escape and while waiting for the rescue boat they fall in love with each other.

== Cast ==
- George Walsh as Shark Rawley
- Robert Broderick as Rodman Selby
- William Nally as Sanchez
- James T. Mack as Hump Logan
- Henry Pemberton as Juan Najera
- Marie Pagano as Carlotta
- Mary Hall as Doris Selby

== See also ==
- List of Fox Film films
- 1937 Fox vault fire
