= Marcel Le Picard =

American cinematographer

- Born: January 17, 1887; Le Havre, France
- Died: May 25, 1952 (aged 65); Los Angeles, California, United States
- Occupation: Cinematographer
- Years active: 1915-1952 (film)

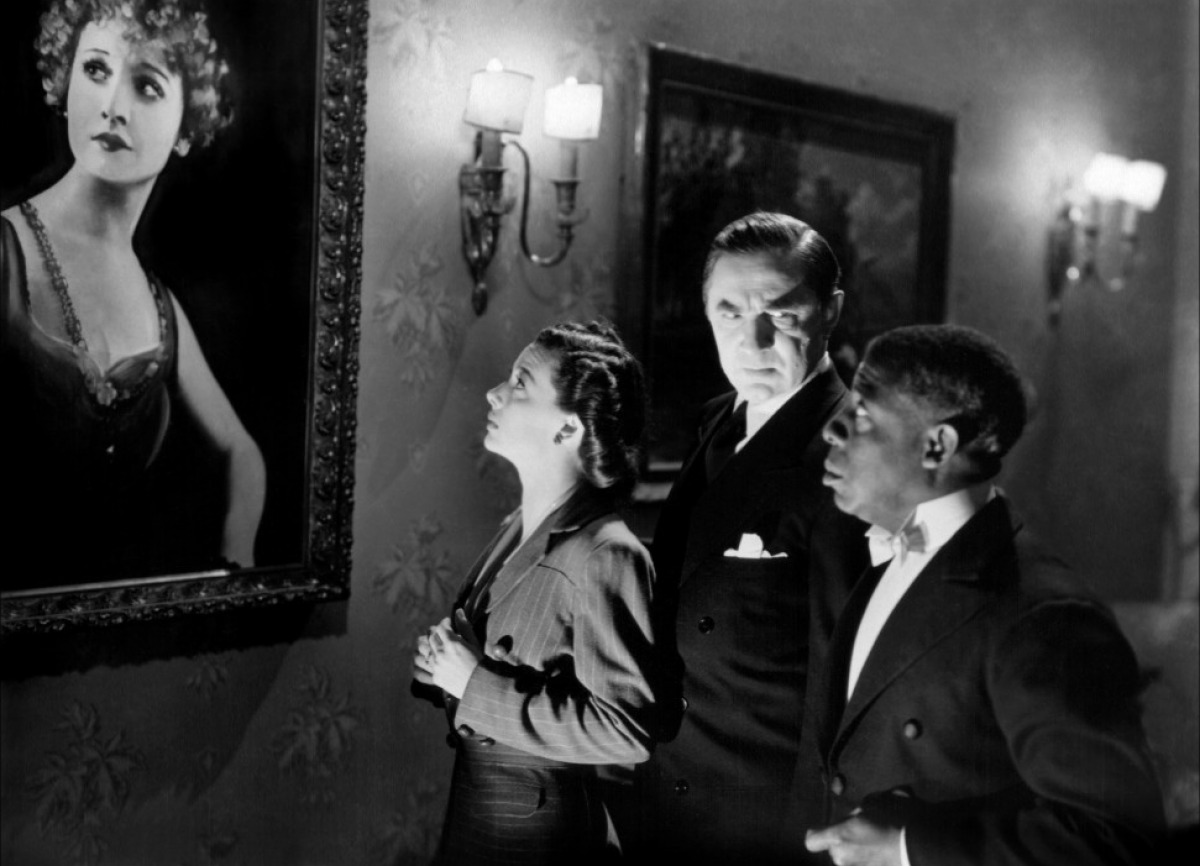
L. to R. : Polly Ann Young, Bela Lugosi, and Clarence Muse in Invisible Ghost (1941) - cropped screenshot

Marcel Le Picard (1887–1952) was a French cinematographer known for his work on American films. He shot around two hundred films between 1916 and 1953. He did much of his prolific work for low-budget studios such as Republic Pictures, Monogram Pictures and Producers Releasing Corporation.

== Selected filmography ==
- The Outlaw's Revenge (1915)
- A Daughter of the Gods (1916)
- Sins of Ambition (1917)
- Day Dreams (1919)
- Through the Wrong Door (1919)
- Leave It to Susan (1919)
- Water, Water, Everywhere (1920)
- Cyclone Jones (1923)
- I Am the Man (1924)
- White Mice (1926)
- The Broadway Boob (1926)
- Back to Liberty (1927)
- His Rise to Fame (1927)
- Combat (1927)
- The Winning Oar (1927)
- The Broadway Drifter (1927)
- Inspiration (1928)
- The Legion of Missing Men (1937)
- The Shadow Strikes (1937)
- Man from Texas (1939)
- The Golden Trail (1940)
- Roll Wagons Roll (1940)
- Invisible Ghost (1941)
- Bowery Blitzkrieg (1941)
- Murder by Invitation (1941)
- Silver Stallion (1941)
- The Pioneers (1941)
- Gentleman from Dixie (1941)
- Riot Squad (1941)
- Miss V from Moscow (1942)
- Phantom Killer (1942)
- The Panther's Claw (1942)
- The Yanks Are Coming (1942)
- One Thrilling Night (1942)
- Submarine Base (1943)
- The Girl from Monterrey (1943)
- Voodoo Man (1944)
- A Fig Leaf for Eve (1944)
- What a Man! (1944)
- Shadow of Suspicion (1944)
- Law of the Valley (1944)
- Gangs of the Waterfront (1945)
- A Sporting Chance (1945)
- Forgotten Women (1949)
- Jet Job (1952)

== Bibliography ==
- John T. Soister, Henry Nicolella, Steve Joyce. American Silent Horror, Science Fiction and Fantasy Feature Films, 1913-1929. McFarland, 2014.
