= A Bowery Cinderella =

1927 film directed by Burton L. King

- Directed by: Burton L. King
- Written by: Harry Chandlee; Melvin Houston; Adrian Johnson
- Produced by: Samuel Zierler; Harry Chandlee
- Starring: Gladys Hulette; Pat O'Malley; Kate Bruce
- Cinematography: Arthur Reeves
- Production company: Excellent Pictures
- Distributed by: Excellent Pictures
- Release date: November 1, 1927
- Running time: 57 minutes
- Country: United States
- Languages: Silent; English intertitles

A Bowery Cinderella is a 1927 American silent drama film directed by Burton L. King and starring Gladys Hulette, Pat O'Malley and Kate Bruce.

== Synopsis ==
A financially struggling fashion designer from the Bowery receives assistance from a wealthy theatrical producer who visits the shop where she works, which causes problems with her boyfriend.

== Cast ==
- Gladys Hulette as Nora Denahy
- Pat O'Malley as Larry Dugan
- Kate Bruce as Bridget Denahy
- Ernest Hilliard as Ned Chandler
- Rosemary Theby as Mrs. Chandler
- Pat Hartigan as Pat Denahy
- Pauline Carr as Maisie Brent

== Bibliography ==
- Munden, Kenneth White. The American Film Institute Catalog of Motion Pictures Produced in the United States, Part 1. University of California Press, 1997.
