= Life's Crossroads =

1928 film

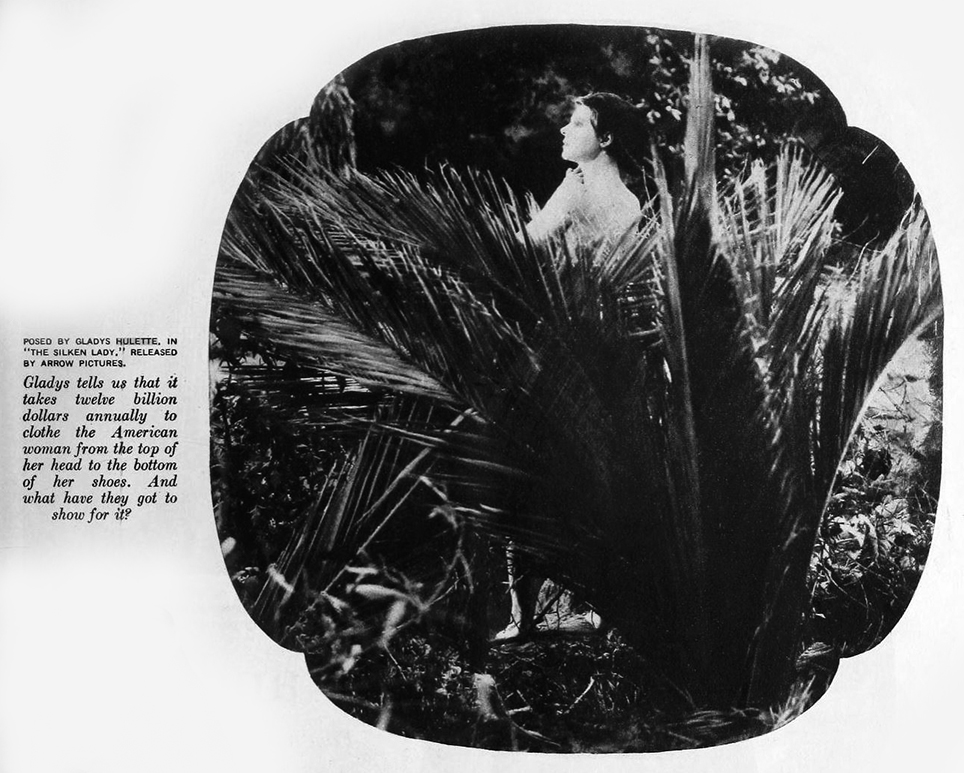
- Directed by: Edgar Lewis
- Written by: Eloise Macie Lewis
- Produced by: Samuel Zierler
- Starring: Gladys Hulette; Mahlon Hamilton; William Conklin
- Production company: Excellent Pictures
- Distributed by: Excellent Pictures
- Release date: October 20, 1928
- Running time: 60 minutes
- Country: United States
- Languages: Silent; English intertitles

Life's Crossroads is a 1928 American silent drama film directed by Edgar Lewis and starring Gladys Hulette, Mahlon Hamilton and William Conklin. It is also known by the alternative title of The Silken Lady.

A man and a woman who strongly dislike each other are the only survivors of a shipwreck on a tropical coastline.

== Cast ==
- Gladys Hulette as The Lady
- Mahlon Hamilton as The Man
- William Conklin as The Stranger
- William J. Humphrey as The Consul

== Bibliography ==
- Munden, Kenneth White. The American Film Institute Catalog of Motion Pictures Produced in the United States, Part 1. University of California Press, 1997.
