= Sergeant York (film) =

1941 biographical film directed by Howard Hawks

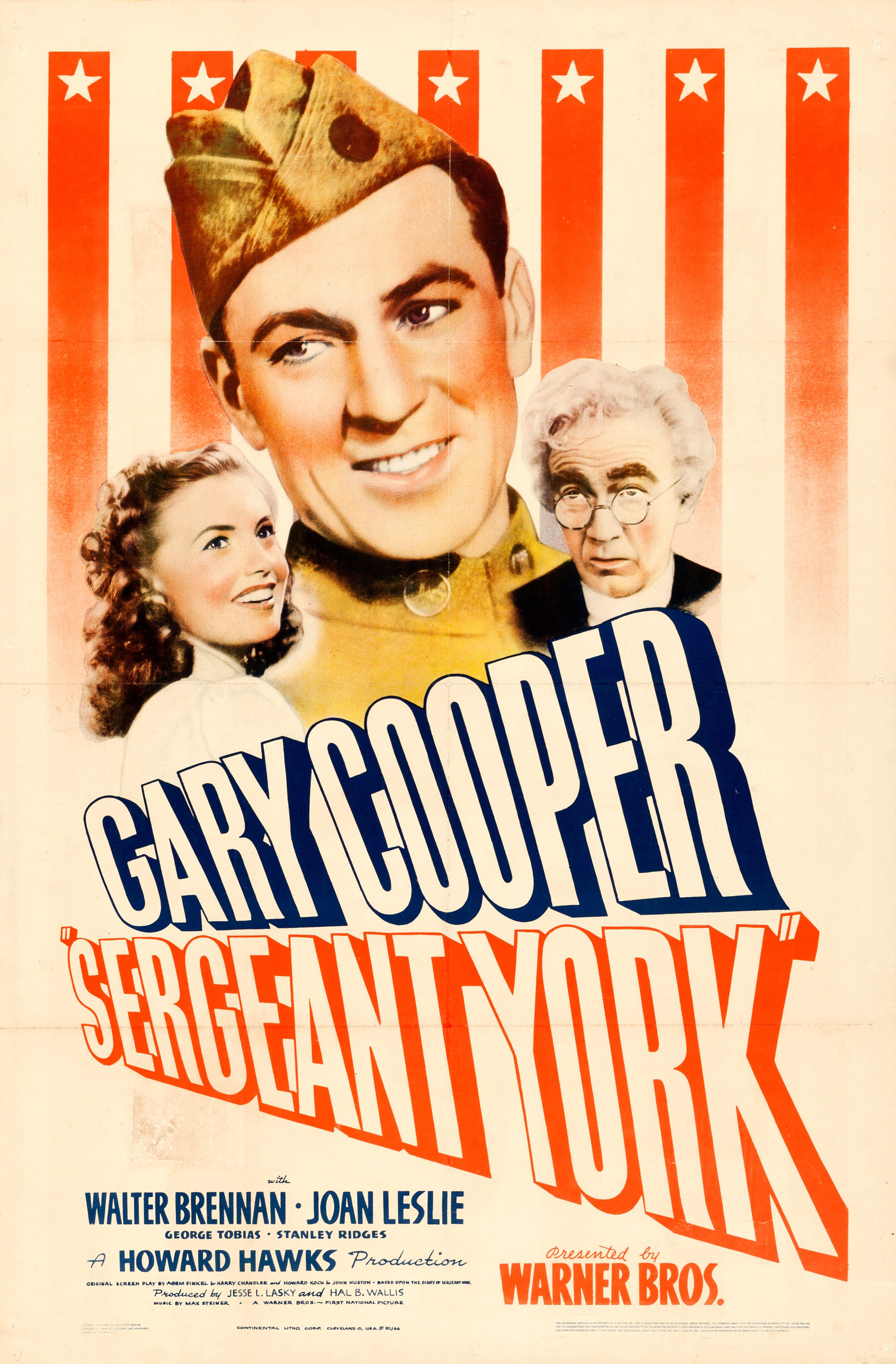
- Theatrical release poster
- Directed by: Howard Hawks
- Screenplay by: Harry Chandlee; Abem Finkel; John Huston; Howard E. Koch
- Based on: Sergeant York: His Own Life Story and War Diary; 1928 book by: Tom Skeyhill; Alvin York
- Produced by: Howard Hawks; Jesse L. Lasky; Hal B. Wallis
- Starring: Gary Cooper; Walter Brennan; Joan Leslie; George Tobias; Stanley Ridges
- Cinematography: Sol Polito
- Edited by: William Holmes
- Music by: Max Steiner
- Production company: Warner Bros. Pictures
- Distributed by: Warner Bros. Pictures
- Release date: July 2, 1941 (New York City)
- Running time: 134 minutes
- Country: United States
- Language: English
- Budget: $1.7 million
- Box office: $8.3 million

Sergeant York is a 1941 American biographical film about the life of Alvin C. York, one of the most decorated American soldiers of World War I. Directed by Howard Hawks, the film stars Gary Cooper in the title role, and was based on York's diary Sergeant York: His Own Life Story and War Diary, as edited by Tom Skeyhill, and adapted by Harry Chandlee, Abem Finkel, John Huston, Howard E. Koch, and Sam Cowan (uncredited). York refused, several times, to authorize a film version of his life story, but finally yielded to persistent efforts to finance the creation of an interdenominational Bible school. The story that York insisted on Cooper for the title role comes from a telegram that producer Jesse L. Lasky wrote to Cooper pleading with him to accept the part, to which he signed York's name.

Sergeant York was a critical and commercial success, and became the highest-grossing film of the year. Cooper went on to win the Academy Award for Best Actor for his performance, while the film also won Best Film Editing and was nominated in nine other categories, including Best Picture, Best Director, Best Supporting Actor (Walter Brennan), and Best Supporting Actress (Margaret Wycherly). The American Film Institute ranked the film 57th in its 100 most inspirational American movies list; it also rated Alvin York 35th in its list of the top 50 heroes in American cinema. In 2008, Sergeant York was selected for preservation in the United States National Film Registry by the Library of Congress as being "culturally, historically, or aesthetically significant".

== Plot ==
Before America's entry into World War I, Alvin York is a poor, young farmer in rural Tennessee, living with his widowed mother Mary Elizabeth, sister Rosie, and younger brother George. He spends his time fighting and getting drunk with friends. Alvin's goal is to purchase a piece of farmland, fertile "bottomland". He works hard to acquire the price for the land, and is given an extension by the owner Nate Tomkins. His sharpshooting skills enable him to raise the money needed, but Nate reneges, making Alvin seek revenge, only for him and his mule to be struck by lightning, prompting him to rejoin his church.

When the U.S. enters World War I, Alvin seeks exemption as a conscientious objector, which is denied. He is torn between fighting for his country and the biblical prohibition against killing. His sympathetic commanding officer gives him leave to go home and come to a decision. He reconciles his moral conflict after reading the biblical injunction to "render unto Caesar the things that are Caesar's, and unto God the things that are God's."

During the Meuse–Argonne offensive, Alvin's qualms vanish when he sees his friends and comrades being killed as they assault a strong German position. With all of his superiors dead or incapacitated, he takes charge. He infiltrates the German lines by himself and finds a position that enfilades the main German defensive trench. He kills so many German soldiers that they eventually surrender to him en masse. After a prisoner of war treacherously throws a grenade that kills Alvin's good friend, "Pusher" Ross, Alvin shoots him dead. He and the handful of survivors from his unit lead their many captives behind their lines, but have a hard time finding anyone to take the Germans off their hands. The officer who finally does is astonished to learn that so few men captured so many of the enemy.

Alvin is decorated and hailed as a national hero, feted in Europe, New York, and Washington, D.C., but he desires to return home. He rejects commercial offers that would make him wealthy, explaining that he could not take money for doing his duty. He returns home to marry his fiancée, Gracie Williams. To his surprise, the state has purchased the bottomland farm and built a house for Gracie and him.

== Cast ==
- Gary Cooper as Alvin C. York
- Walter Brennan as Pastor Rosier Pile
- Joan Leslie as Gracie Williams
- George Tobias as "Pusher" Ross
- Stanley Ridges as Major G. Edward Buxton Jr.
- Margaret Wycherly as Mary Elizabeth York
- Ward Bond as Ike Botkin
- Noah Beery Jr. as Buck Lipscomb
- June Lockhart as Rosie York
- Dickie Moore as George York
- Clem Bevans as Zeke
- Howard Da Silva as Lem
- Charles Trowbridge as Cordell Hull
- Harvey Stephens as Captain Danforth
- David Bruce as Bert Thomas
- Charles Esmond as German Major
- Joseph Sawyer as Sergeant Early
- Pat Flaherty as Sergeant Harry Parsons
- Robert Porterfield as Zeb Andrews
- Erville Alderson as Nate Tomkins

Uncredited cast

- Frank Wilcox as Sergeant
- Russell Hicks as General
- Don Douglas as Captain Tillman
- Arthur Aylesworth as Marten
- Lane Chandler as Corporal Savage
- Frank Marlowe as Beardsley
- Edward Keane as Oscar Tschirky
- Elisha Cook Jr. as Piano Player
- George Irving as Harrison
- Jack Pennick as Corporal Cutting
- James Anderson as Eb
- Guy Wilkerson as Tom
- Tully Marshall as Uncle Lige
- Gig Young as Marching Soldier
- Lee "Lasses" White as Luke
- Si Jenks as Mountaineer

== Reception ==
Sergeant York was a success at the box office and became the highest-grossing film of the year. This was influenced by the attack on Pearl Harbor, which occurred while the film was still playing in theaters. The film's patriotic theme helped recruit soldiers; young men sometimes went directly from the movie theater to military enlistment offices. After its initial release, the film was frequently reshown at theaters all over America during the war as a quick replacement for box-office flops and as a theme program for bond sales and scrap drives.

According to Warners records, the film earned $6,075,000 domestically and $2,184,000 internationally.

On review aggregator Rotten Tomatoes, the film holds an 81% rating based on 26 reviews, with an average rating of 7.4/10.

== Accolades ==
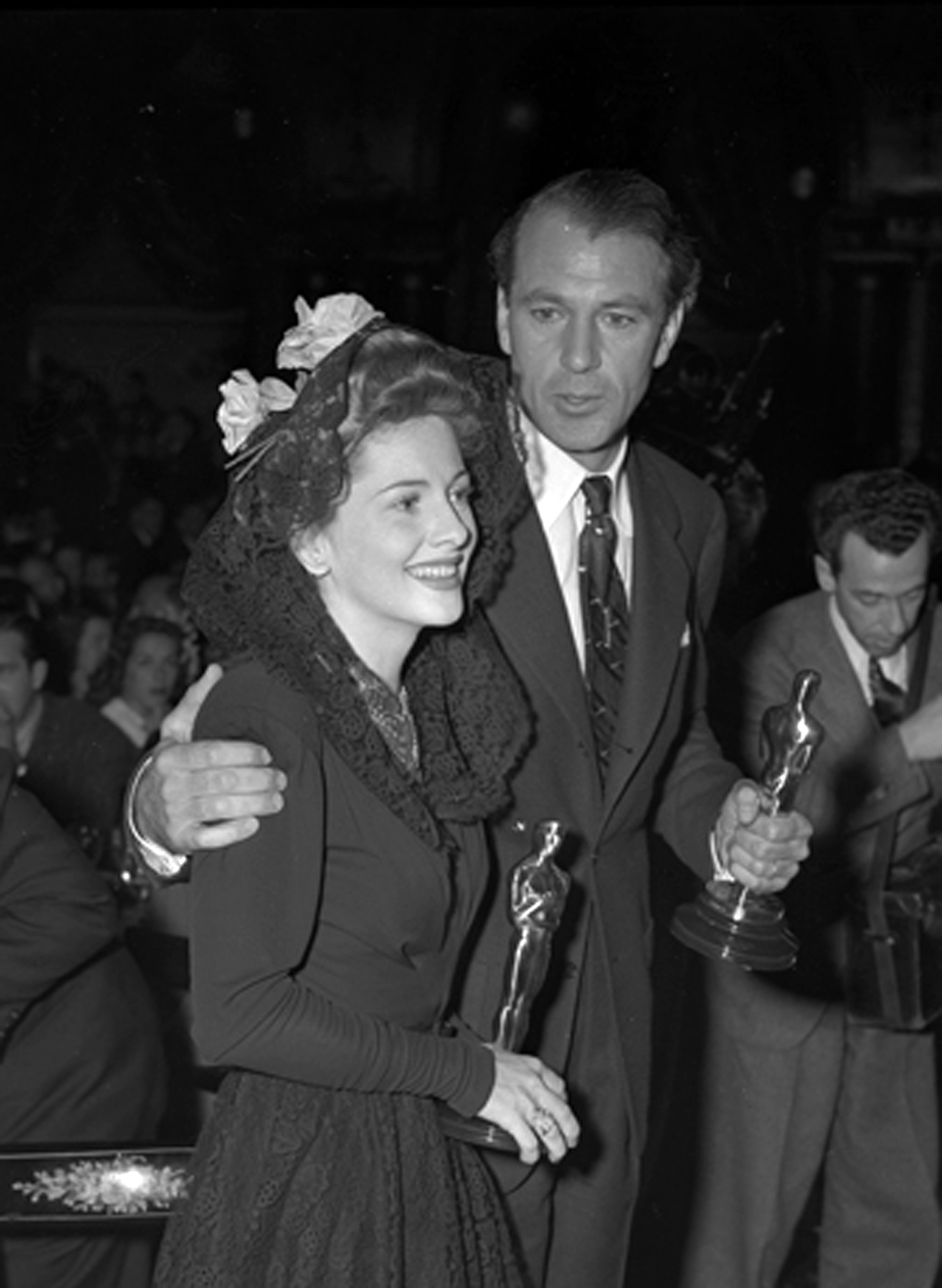
Gary Cooper, with his Academy Award for the film, and Joan Fontaine, 1942

Award	Category	Nominee(s)	Result
Academy Awards	Outstanding Motion Picture	Hal B. Wallis and Jesse L. Lasky	Nominated
Academy Awards	Best Director	Howard Hawks	Nominated
Academy Awards	Best Actor	Gary Cooper	Won
Academy Awards	Best Supporting Actor	Walter Brennan	Nominated
Academy Awards	Best Supporting Actress	Margaret Wycherly	Nominated
Academy Awards	Best Original Screenplay	Harry Chandlee, Abem Finkel, John Huston and Howard Koch	Nominated
Academy Awards	Best Art Direction-Interior Decoration – Black-and-White	John Hughes and Fred M. MacLean	Nominated
Academy Awards	Best Cinematography – Black-and-White	Sol Polito	Nominated
Academy Awards	Best Film Editing	William Holmes	Won
Academy Awards	Best Scoring of a Dramatic Picture	Max Steiner	Nominated
Academy Awards	Best Sound Recording	Nathan Levinson	Nominated
National Board of Review Awards	Best Acting	Gary Cooper	Won
National Film Preservation Board	National Film Registry		Inducted
New York Film Critics Circle Awards	Best Film		Nominated
New York Film Critics Circle Awards	Best Actor	Gary Cooper	Won

The film was nominated by the American Film Institute for its 2006 list of most inspiring movies.
