= Tom Skeyhill =

Australian poet

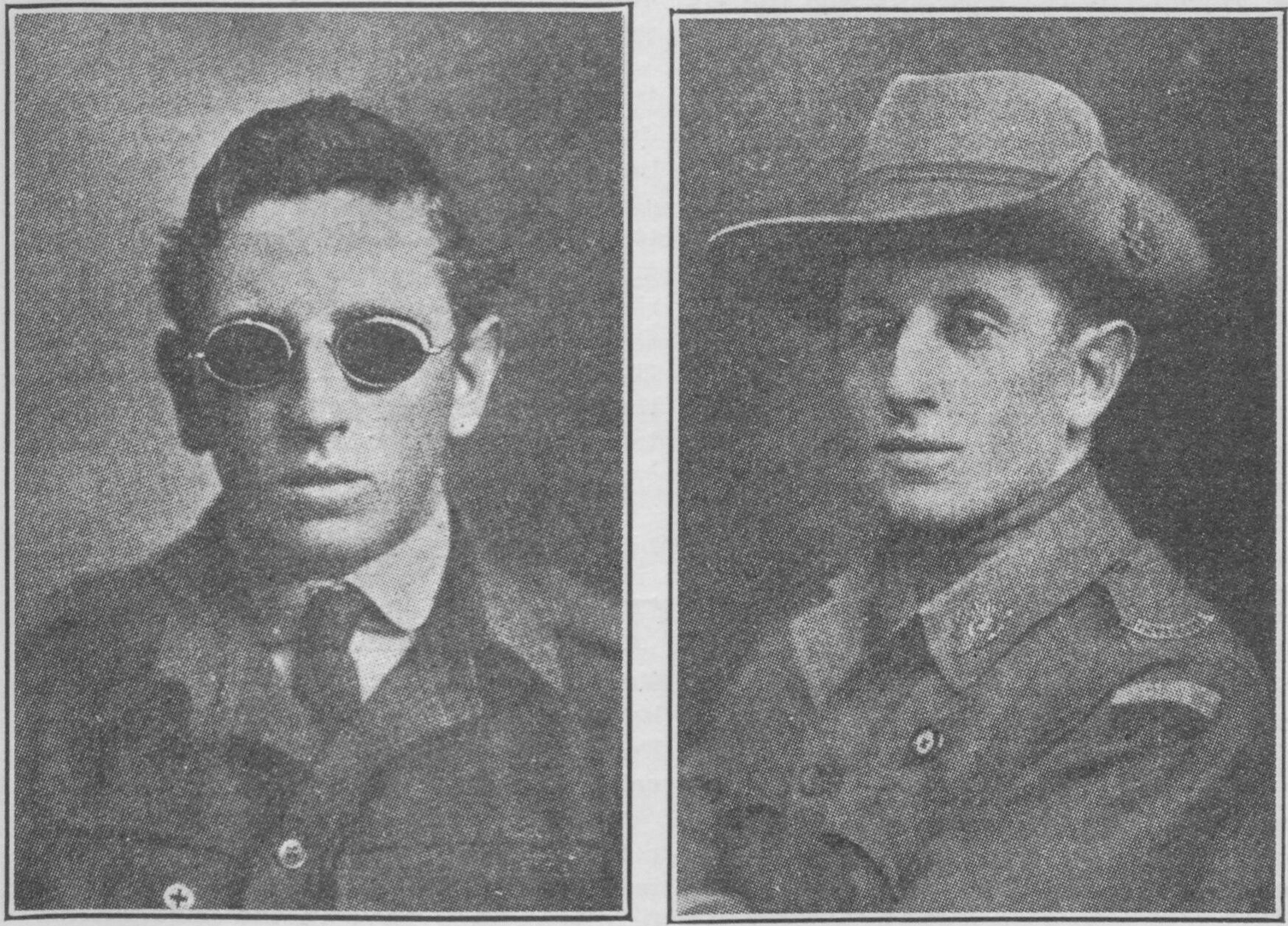
Tom Skeyhill during his period of blindness and shortly after having his sight restored

Thomas John Skeyhill (10 January 1895 – 22 May 1932) was born to Annie and James Percy Skeyhill in Terang, Victoria. He was a signaler in the Australian Army in World War I. On 8 May 1915, during the advance at Cape Helles, he was blinded by an exploding Turkish shell; his sight was successfully restored in 1918. He ghostwrote an account about Alvin York, which was later made into a movie of the same name in 1941. He was killed in a plane crash at Barnstable Municipal Airport and was buried with military honors in West Dennis, Massachusetts, where he had a summer home.

“Halt! Thy tread is on heroes' graves
Australian lads lie sleeping below:
Just rough wooden crosses at their heads
To let their comrades know.

They'd sleep no better for marble slabs,
Nor monuments so grand
They lie content, now their day is done
In that far-off foreign land.” — Tom Skeyhill
