= The Serpent (1916 film) =

1916 film

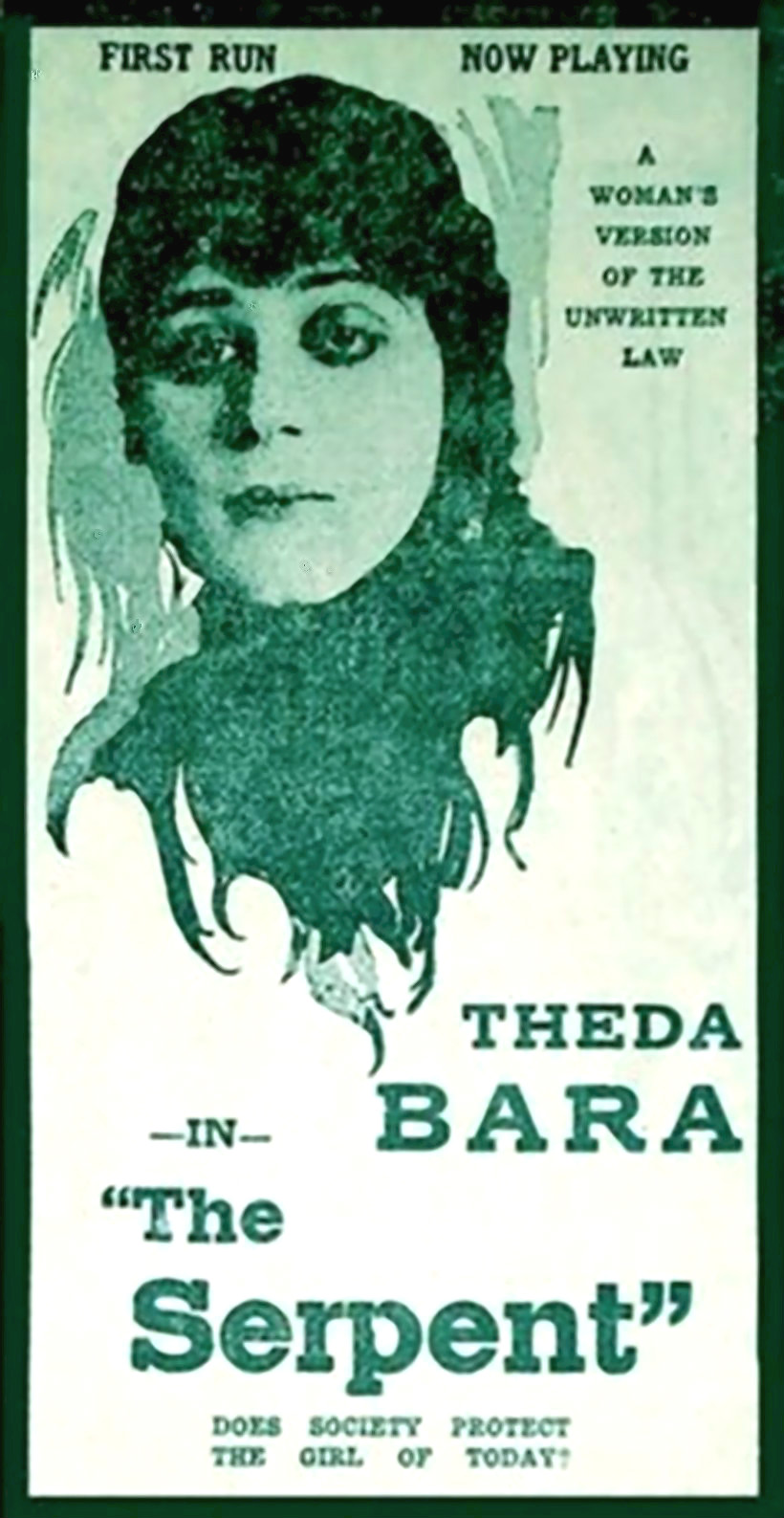
- Film poster
- Directed by: Raoul Walsh
- Written by: George Walsh; Raoul A. Walsh (scenario)
- Based on: "The Wolf's Claw" by Philip Bartholomae
- Produced by: William Fox
- Starring: Theda Bara; James A. Marcus
- Cinematography: Georges Benoît
- Distributed by: Fox Film Corporation
- Release date: January 23, 1916
- Running time: 60 minutes
- Country: United States
- Language: Silent (English intertitles)

The Serpent was a 1916 American silent drama film directed by Raoul Walsh and starring Theda Bara. The film was based on the short story "The Wolf's Claw", by Philip Bartholomae, and its scenario was written by Raoul A. Walsh. Produced and distributed by Fox Film Corporation, The Serpent was shot on location at Chimney Rock, North Carolina, and at the Fox Studio in Fort Lee, New Jersey.

== Plot ==
As described in a film magazine review, after Vania Lazar is betrayed and debauched by Grand Duke Valanoff, she leaves Russia with no thought except to prey upon the sex that has made her what she is. Then comes the war, and she sees wounded Russians being taken to the hospital. In one room, she finds Prince Valanoff, the son of her betrayer, and with her wiles she wins his love and then his name. When the Grand Duke comes to visit, his son the Prince is absent. Not recognizing the new Vania, the Grand Duke responds to her lure, and the son discovers his own father as the betrayer of his happiness.

== Cast ==
- Theda Bara as Vania Lazar
- James A. Marcus as Ivan Lazar
- Lillian Hathaway as Martsa Lazar
- Charles Craig as Grand Duke Valanoff
- Carl Harbaugh as Prince Valanoff
- George Walsh as Andrey Sobi
- Nan Carter as Ema Lachno
- Marcel Morhange as Gregoire
- Bernard Nedell

== Preservation ==
With no prints of The Serpent located in any film archives, it is considered a lost film.

== See also ==
- List of lost films
- 1937 Fox vault fire
