= The Blue Peter (1928 film) =

1928 British film by Arthur Rooke

- Directed by: Arthur Rooke
- Written by: E. Temple Thurston (play); Vivian Thompson
- Starring: Matheson Lang; Gladys Frazin; Mary Dibley; Cameron Carr
- Production company: British Filmcraft
- Distributed by: Woolf & Freedman Film Service
- Release date: 1928
- Running time: 7,665 feet
- Country: United Kingdom
- Languages: Sound (Synchronized); English Intertitles

The Blue Peter is a 1928 British sound adventure film directed by Arthur Rooke and starring Matheson Lang, Gladys Frazin, and Mary Dibley. While the film has no audible dialog, it was released with a synchronized musical score with sound effects using both the sound-on-disc and sound-on-film process. The film was based on the 1925 play The Blue Peter by E. Temple Thurston.

== Premise ==
After returning home to Britain from Nigeria where he has been working, an engineer becomes embroiled in a family melodrama.

== Cast ==
- Matheson Lang as David Hunter
- Gladys Frazin as Rosa Callaghan
- Mary Dibley as Emma
- Cameron Carr as Edward Formby
- A. Bromley Davenport as Mr. Callaghan
- Esmond Knight as Radio operator

== Music ==
The film featured a theme song entitled “Eastern Star” by Fred Elizalde (music) and Pat K. Heale (words).

== Bibliography ==
- Low, Rachael. History of the British Film, 1918-1929. George Allen & Unwin, 1971.
