= Blue Blood and Red =

1916 film directed by Raoul Walsh

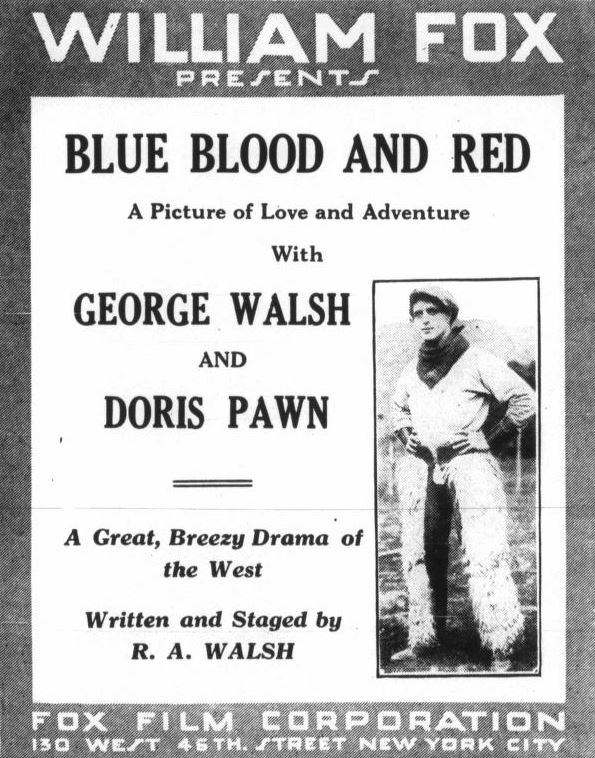
- Directed by: Raoul Walsh
- Written by: Raoul Walsh
- Produced by: Raoul Walsh
- Starring: George Walsh; Martin Kinney; Doris Pawn
- Cinematography: Georges Benoît; Len Powers; George Richter
- Production company: Fox Film
- Distributed by: Fox Film
- Release date: April 2, 1916
- Running time: 50 minutes
- Country: United States
- Language: Silent (English intertitles)

Blue Blood and Red is a 1916 American silent western comedy film directed by Raoul Walsh and starring George Walsh, Martin Kinney, and Doris Pawn.

== Plot ==
After being kicked out of Harvard and thrown out by his millionaire father, a young wastrel heads west in the company of his butler.

== Cast ==
- George Walsh as Algernon DuPont
- Martin Kinney as Peterkin
- Doris Pawn
- James A. Marcus
- Jack Woods
- Augustus Carney
- Vester Pegg

== Preservation ==
With no prints of Blue Blood and Red located in any film archives, it is considered a lost film.

== Bibliography ==
- Solomon, Aubrey. The Fox Film Corporation, 1915-1935: A History and Filmography. McFarland, 2011.
