= The Compulsory Husband =

1930 British film by Monty Banks

- Directed by: Monty Banks; Harry Lachman
- Written by: John Glyder (novel); Rex Taylor; Val Valentine
- Produced by: John Maxwell
- Starring: Monty Banks; Clifford Heatherley; Gladys Frazin
- Cinematography: René Guissart; Theodor Sparkuhl
- Production company: British International Pictures
- Distributed by: Wardour Films
- Release date: 27 February 1930
- Running time: 100 minutes
- Country: United Kingdom
- Language: English

The Compulsory Husband is a 1930 British comedy film directed by Monty Banks and Harry Lachman and starring Banks, Lillian Manton and Clifford Heatherley. It was based on a novel of the same title by John Glyder.

== Cast ==
- Monty Banks as Monty
- Lillian Manton as Joy
- Clifford Heatherley as Mr Pilluski
- Gladys Frazin as Mrs Pilluski
- Trilby Clark as Gilda
- Reginald Fox as Father
- Janet Alexander as Mother
- Michael Powell as Man

== Bibliography ==
- Low, Rachael. Filmmaking in 1930s Britain. George Allen & Unwin, 1985.
- Wood, Linda. British Films, 1927–1939. British Film Institute, 1986.
