= The Dead Line (1920 film) =

1920 film directed by Dell Henderson

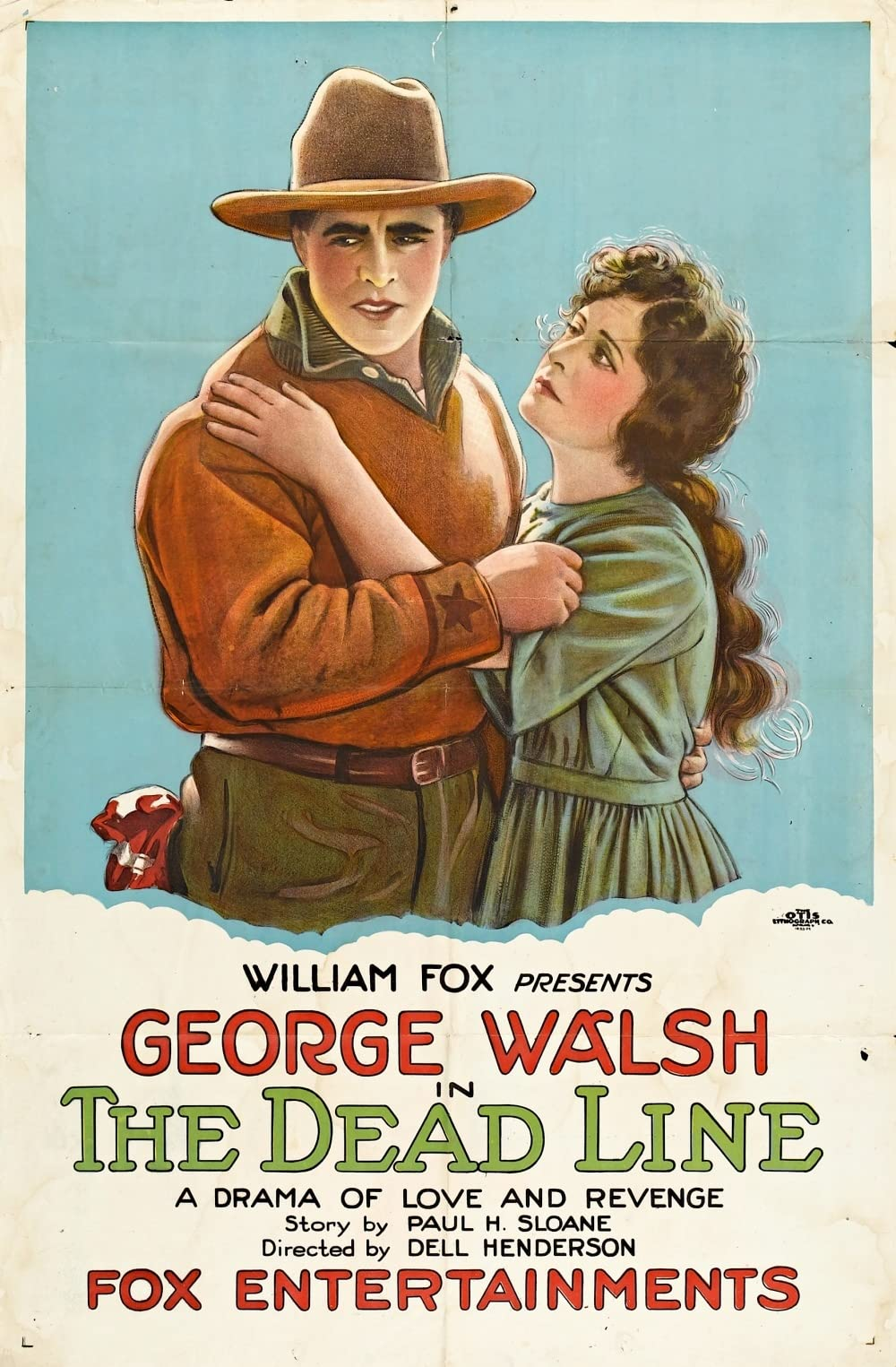
- Directed by: Dell Henderson
- Written by: Paul Sloane
- Produced by: William Fox
- Starring: George Walsh; Irene Boyle; Virginia Valli
- Cinematography: Charles E. Gilson
- Production company: Fox Film Corporation
- Distributed by: Fox Film Corporation
- Release date: May 9, 1920
- Running time: 50 minutes
- Country: United States
- Languages: Silent; English intertitles

The Dead Line is a 1920 American silent drama film directed by Dell Henderson and starring George Walsh, Irene Boyle and Virginia Valli.

== Plot ==
Two families living a hard life in the mountains have a long-standing feud. When one of the younger members of one family refuses to continue the fight, he is branded a coward, but comes to the rescue of a young woman of the opposing family when she is threatened by a moonshiner.

== Cast ==
- George Walsh as Clay Boone
- Irene Boyle as Mollie Powell
- Baby Anita Lopez as 'Bebe' Boone
- Joe Henaway as David Boone
- Al Hart as Lem Harlan
- Henry W. Pemberton as Zeke Harlan
- James Milady as Dan Harlan
- Gus Weinberg as Judge Ramsey
- G.A. Stryker as Dwight Weston
- Virginia Valli as Julia Weston
- James Birdsong as Hamilton Weston
- Jack Hopkins as Buck Gomery

== Bibliography ==
- Connelly, Robert B. The Silents: Silent Feature Films, 1910-36, Volume 40, Issue 2. December Press, 1998.
- Munden, Kenneth White. The American Film Institute Catalog of Motion Pictures Produced in the United States, Part 1. University of California Press, 1997.
- Solomon, Aubrey. The Fox Film Corporation, 1915-1935: A History and Filmography. McFarland, 2011.
