= The Costello Case =

1930 film

- Directed by: Walter Lang
- Written by: F. McGrew Willis
- Produced by: Samuel Zierler
- Starring: Tom Moore
- Distributed by: Sono Art-World Wide Pictures
- Release date: October 15, 1930
- Running time: 65 minutes
- Country: United States
- Language: English

The Costello Case is a 1930 American pre-Code crime film directed by Walter Lang.

== Cast ==
- Tom Moore as Mahoney
- Lola Lane as Mollie
- Roscoe Karns as Blair
- Wheeler Oakman as Mile-Away-Harry
- Russell Hardie as Jimmie
- William B. Davidson as Saunders (as William Davidson)
- Dorothy Vernon as Landlady
- Jack Richardson as Donnelly
- W. E. Lawrence as Babe
- Millard K. Wilson as Henderson (as M.K. Wilson)
