= George Walsh =

American actor (1889–1981)

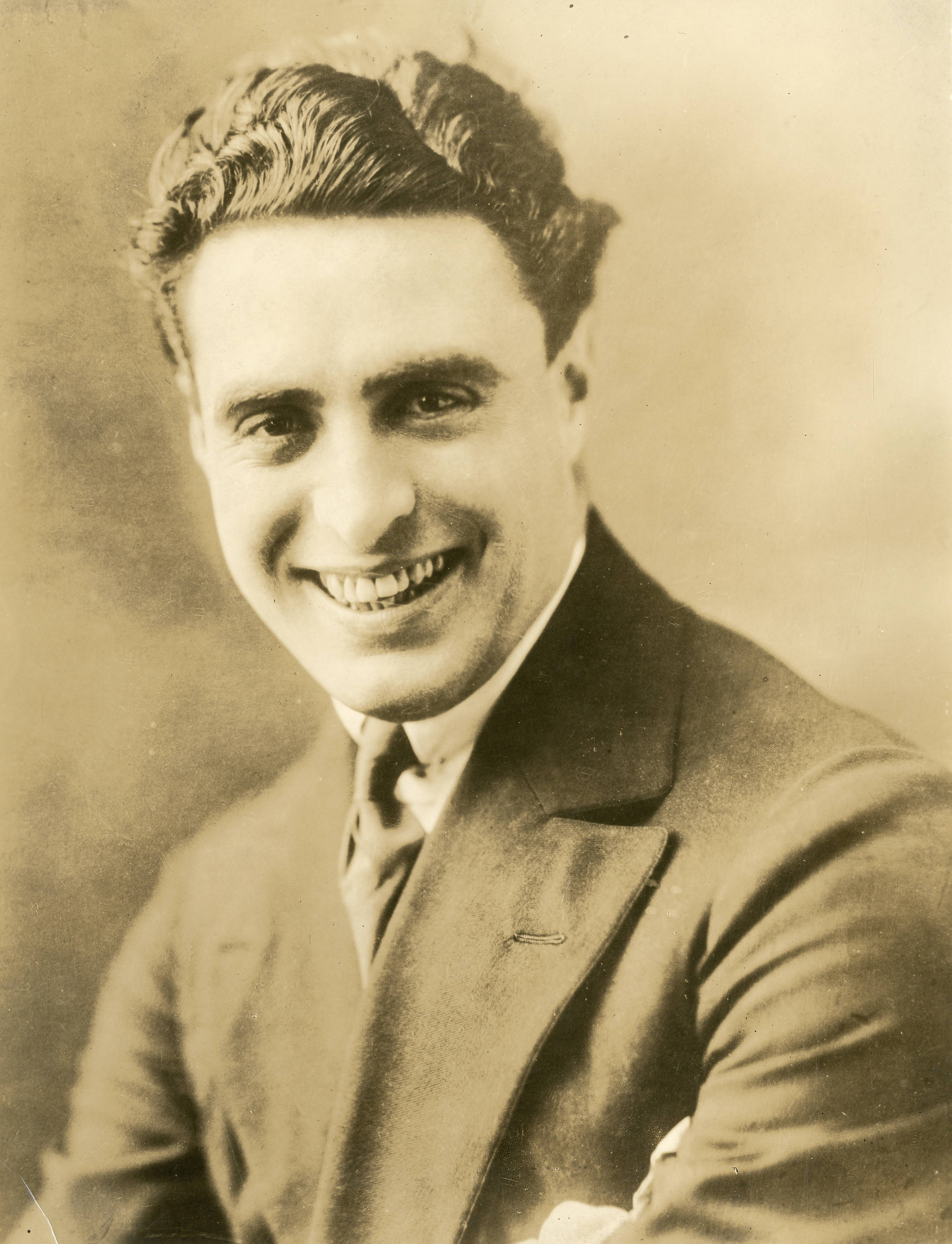
- Walsh c. 1920
- Born: George Frederick Walsh; March 16, 1889; New York City, U.S.
- Died: June 13, 1981 (aged 92); Pomona, California, U.S.
- Occupation: Actor
- Years active: 1914–1936
- Spouse: Seena Owen (m. 1916; div. 1924)
- Children: 1
- Relatives: Raoul Walsh (brother)

George Frederick Walsh (March 16, 1889 – June 13, 1981) was an American actor. An athlete who became an actor and later returned to sport, he enjoyed 40 years of fame and was a performer with dual appeal, with women loving his sexy charm and men appreciating his manly bravura.

Known variously as "the Laughing Athletic Thunderbolt", "the Apollo of the Silver Sheet", "the Screen's Greatest Athlete" and "the King of Smiles", Walsh had a movie career that stretched from the start of true US filmmaking to the Golden Era (22 years), during which time he was featured in approximately 80 productions. He was attached to such studios as Mutual, Chadwick, Triangle, Fox, Universal, Goldwyn, United Artists, and Paramount.

== Early life ==
George Frederick Walsh was born in New York City to Elizabeth T. Bruff, the daughter of Irish Catholic immigrants, and Thomas W. Walsh, a clothing manufacturer who was born in England and came to the United States when he was 14 years old. He had an older brother, who became film director Raoul Walsh, and a sister Alice.

A gifted athlete, Walsh was active in track and field in high school, and he was a running back and punter in football at Fordham University and Georgetown University. He briefly played professionally with the Brooklyn Dodgers.

== Career ==
=== Early career ===
While recuperating in California from an injury in late 1914, Walsh entered motion pictures (thanks to his brother Raoul) when he was engaged as an extra for D. W. Griffith’s epic The Birth of a Nation (1915). Various bit parts followed, until a small role in The Fencing Master (1915) proved he was capable of more.

Griffith’s confidence in him was such that he included Walsh in an important scene in his masterpiece, Intolerance (1916). While a cast member, Walsh met actress Seena Owen. They married and had one child together, a daughter named Patricia.

=== Fox ===
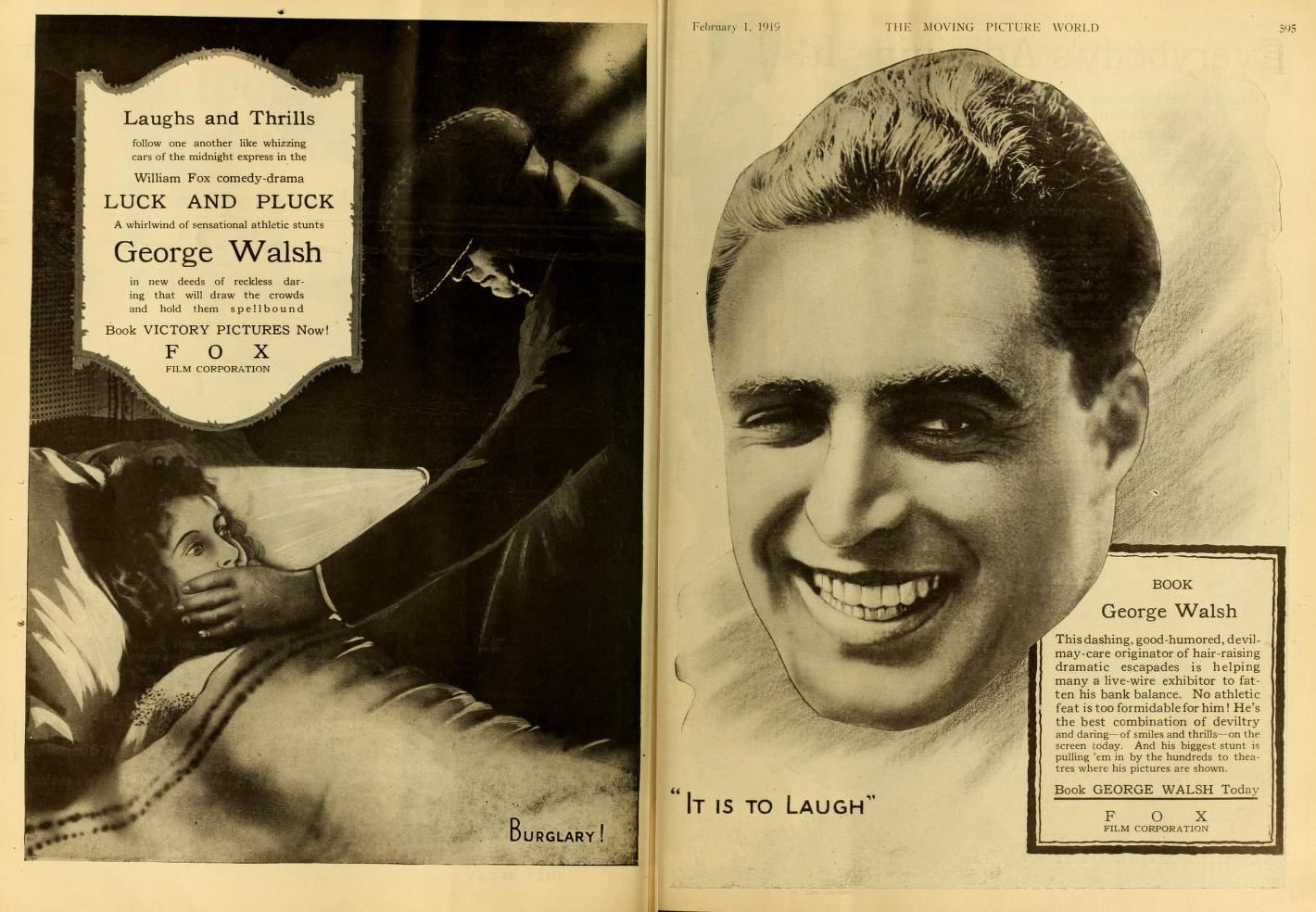
Advertisement in trade journal Moving Picture World for Fox production Luck and Pluck (1919)

Walsh proved himself at Reliance/Majestic on the West Coast and moved to the newly established Fox Film Corporation on the East Coast, becoming a serious rival to Douglas Fairbanks there, as well as a national and international star. His roles for the studio were characterized by daring stunts, fights, dramatic pursuits, and happy endings with his female co-stars. He also perfected his comedy timing and learned how to get laughs. It was far from amusing when he quarreled with William Fox about his salary and departed the studio towards the end of 1920.

Two years of ups and downs followed, during which he played in Serenade (1921), along with his sister-in-law, Miriam Cooper. He also made varied personal appearances; performed vaudeville; endured an unpleasant divorce trial; and appeared in an 18-episode historical serial, entitled With Stanley in Africa (1922).

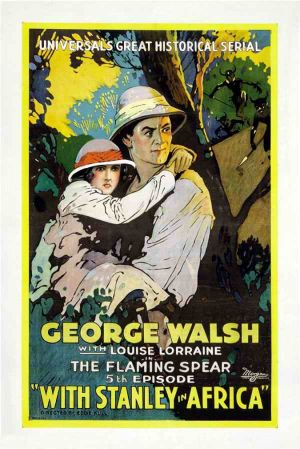
Promotional poster for With Stanley in Africa (1922)

=== Goldwyn ===
A single-picture deal Vanity Fair (1923), at Goldwyn Pictures Corporation, led to a long contract and a quick shift from supporting characters to leads. Walsh emphatically returned to the big time with the role of Don Diego, opposite Mary Pickford, in Rosita (1923). (Global audiences saw "America’s Sweetheart" get her first grown-up kiss from Walsh in this Ernst Lubitsch-directed vehicle.) More spectacular still was the announcement that June Mathis had selected him to portray Judah Ben-Hur, in the planned film adaptation of the classic story Ben-Hur, by Lew Wallace.

=== Ben-Hur ===
The word "fiasco" has been attached to Ben-Hur (1925). Early to mid-production was hampered by problems, both on location in Italy and in Hollywood. The sudden merger of Goldwyn with Metro, in spring of 1924, to form Metro-Goldwyn (soon afterwards Metro-Goldwyn-Mayer) disrupted the production. Despite Mathis’ belief in him, a strong track record, and his physical suitability, George Walsh was unceremoniously cast aside (in favor of Ramon Novarro), as were June Mathis and the director, Charles Brabin. Following the devastating news—from co-star and friend Francis X. Bushman—Walsh was soon on his way back from Italy to the United States. He would remain vexed that the newly formed MGM did little to combat rumors that he had not been up to standard.

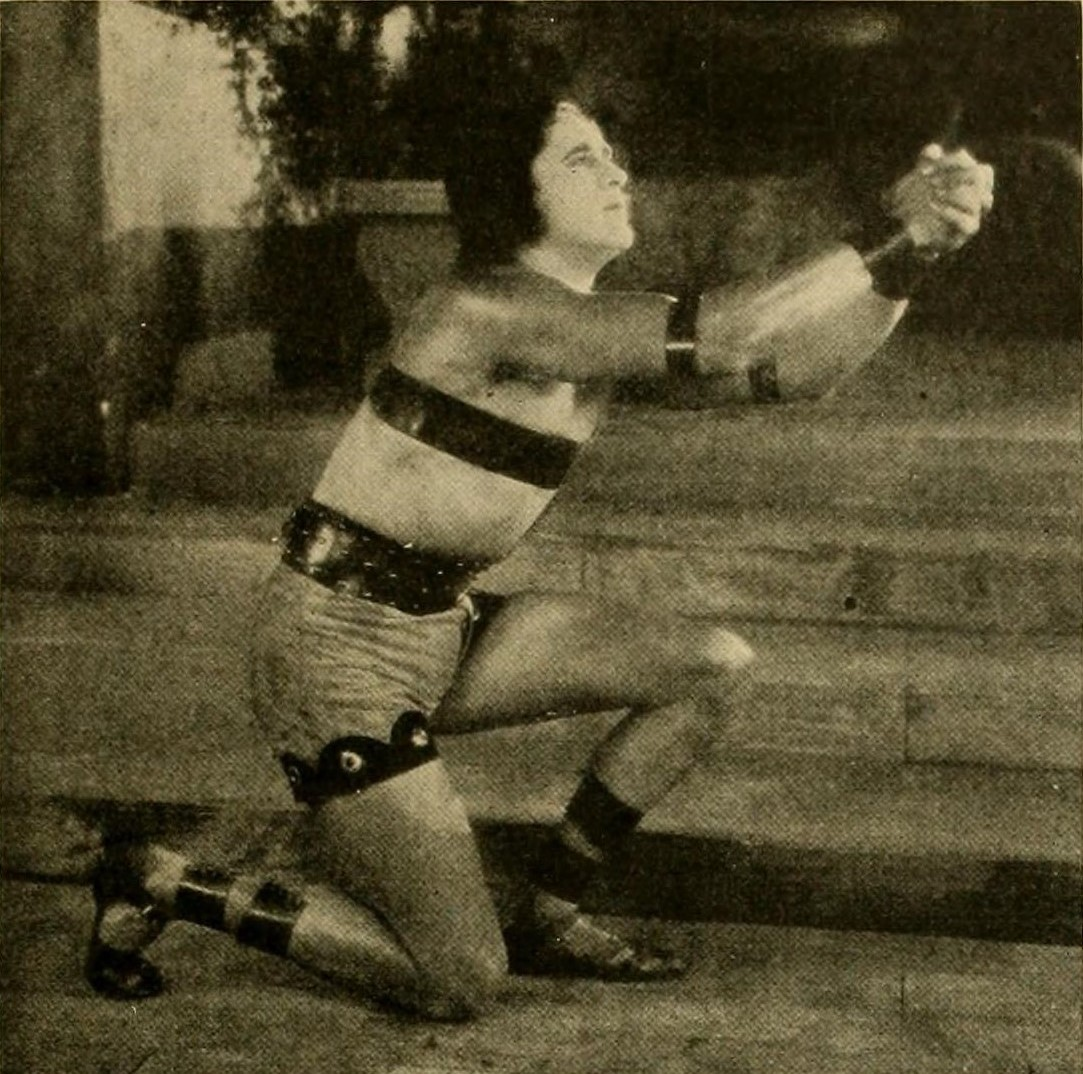
A pre-production image of Walsh in Ben-Hur (1925) before he was replaced by Ramon Novarro

=== After Ben-Hur ===
Despite the loss of the part of a lifetime, Walsh had a following that enabled him to secure a deal with I. E. Chadwick's independent company (which also employed Lionel Barrymore at the time). From 1925 to 1926 Walsh was cast in a series of Fox-like entertainments, most of which were well-received and popular. However, broken promises prompted Walsh to depart for the lower profile, but industrious, Excellent Pictures Corporation. While there, he appeared in several economically produced silents, including The Kick-Off (1926), Broadway Drifter (1927), His Rise to Fame (1927), and Inspiration (1928).

== Later career ==
It was not until 1932 that George Walsh appeared in a talkie. His brother revived his career by casting him as a criminal in Me and My Gal (1932), with Spencer Tracy and Joan Bennett. The part of 'Duke' Castenega convinced Walsh and others that he still had creative life, and for the next four years he kept busy as a supporting actor and bit part player. This was a common fate for actors from the silent era who had to adapt to the age of sound. Walsh retired when he was approaching 50 and was no longer in good physical shape.

== After Hollywood ==
Following the conclusion of his acting career, Walsh returned to horse training and horse breeding, his occupation between silents and talkies. For a time, George trained his brother Raoul's stable of Thoroughbred racehorses. Their horse Sunset Trail competed in the 1937 Kentucky Derby, won by War Admiral, who went on to win the U.S. Triple Crown. Sunset Trail finished 16th in a field of 20 runners.

In the 1940s Walsh married for a second time, and enjoyed many years of happy retirement in California. The destruction/loss of two-thirds of his movies meant he could not be included in silent film compilations on TV in the 1960s and the 1970s. Regardless, he was interviewed by historians and journalists who sought him out for actor profiles, Hollywood articles, and movie anecdotes.

== Death ==
He died in Pomona, California of pneumonia at the age of 92. He is buried in San Gabriel Cemetery, Los Angeles.

== Selected filmography ==
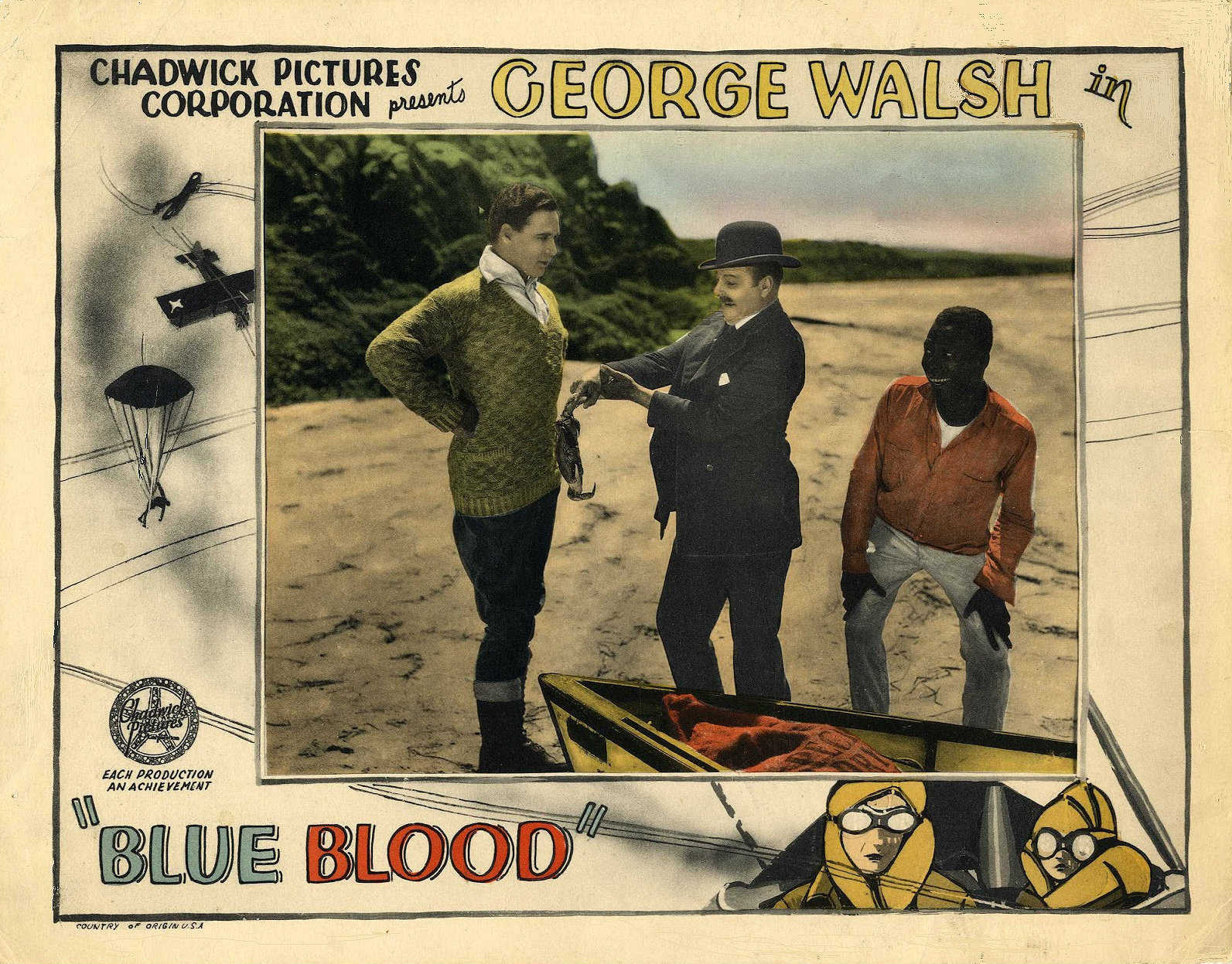
A lobby card for Blue Blood (1925)

- The Birth of a Nation (1915) - Minor Role (uncredited)
- The Fencing Master (1915)
- A Bad Man and Others (1915)
- Don Quixote (1915)
- The Serpent (1916)
- Gold and the Woman (1916)
- Blue Blood and Red (1916)
- The Beast (1916)
- Intolerance (1916)
- The Island of Desire (1917)
- Melting Millions (1917)
- The Book Agent (1917)
- The Honor System (1917)
- The Pride of New York (1917)
- The Yankee Way (1917)
- Some Boy! (1917)
- Jack Spurlock, Prodigal (1918)
- On the Jump (1918)
- The Kid Is Clever (1918) - Himself/Kirk White
- I'll Say So (1918)
- Luck and Pluck (1919)
- Never Say Quit (1919)
- Help! Help! Police! (1919)
- Putting One Over (1919)
- The Winning Stroke (1919)
- The Shark (1920)
- A Manhattan Knight (1920)
- The Plunger (1920)
- The Dead Line (1920)
- Dynamite Allen (1921)
- With Stanley in Africa (1922)
- Vanity Fair (1923)
- Rosita (1923)
- Slave of Desire (1923)
- Reno (1923)
- The Miracle Makers (1923)
- Souls for Sale (1923) - Himself (uncredited)
- American Pluck (1925)
- Ben-Hur: A Tale of the Christ (1925) (he recorded almost the entire film, but was replaced by Ramon Novarro)
- Blue Blood (1925)
- A Man of Quality (1926)
- The Prince of Broadway (1926)
- The Test of Donald Norton (1926)
- Striving for Fortune (1926)
- The Kick-Off (1926)
- Back to Liberty (1927)
- The Broadway Drifter (1927)
- The Winning Oar (1927)
- His Rise to Fame (1927)
- Combat (1927)
- Inspiration (1928)
- Me and My Gal (1932)
- Out of Singapore (1932)
- The Return of Casey Jones (1933)
- The Bowery (1933)
- Black Beauty (1933)
- Cleopatra (1934)
- The Live Wire (1936)
