= The Speed Classic =

1928 film

- Argentine poster
- Directed by: Bruce M. Mitchell
- Written by: Arthur Hoerl; Al Martin
- Produced by: Samuel Zierler
- Starring: Rex Lease; Mildred Harris; Mitchell Lewis
- Cinematography: Max Dupont; William Underhill
- Edited by: Bertha A. Montaigen
- Production company: Excellent Pictures
- Distributed by: Excellent Pictures
- Release date: July 31, 1928
- Running time: 50 minutes
- Country: United States
- Languages: Silent; English intertitles

The Speed Classic is a 1928 American silent action film directed by Bruce M. Mitchell and starring Rex Lease, Mildred Harris and Mitchell Lewis.

== Synopsis ==
A young man obsessed with cars is dumped by his girlfriend, and goes on a binge in Mexico where he ends up in jail. His girlfriend has a change of heart and gets his released in time to compete in a major car race.

== Cast ==
- Rex Lease as Jerry Thornton
- Mildred Harris as Sheila Van Hauten
- Mitchell Lewis as Mr. Thornton
- James Mason as Pedro de Malpa
- Helen Jerome Eddy as Keziah Stubbs
- Otis Harlan as The Thirsty One
- Garry O'Dell as Jonah
- Jack Richardson as Speed Cop

== Preservation ==
The film is now lost.

== Bibliography ==
- Munden, Kenneth White. The American Film Institute Catalog of Motion Pictures Produced in the United States, Part 1. University of California Press, 1997.
