= The Winning Stroke =

1919 film

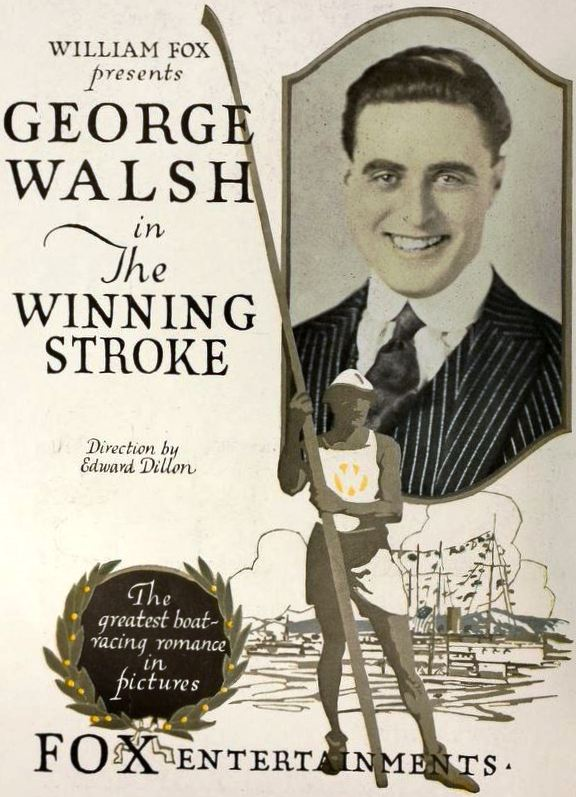
- Advertisement
- Directed by: Edward Dillon
- Written by: Raymond L. Schrock; Edward Sedgwick; Hamilton Thompson
- Produced by: William Fox
- Starring: George Walsh
- Cinematography: Al Leach; Howard Plimpton (Yale race scenes); 10 other cameramen
- Distributed by: Fox Film Corporation
- Release date: September 7, 1919
- Running time: 5 reels
- Country: United States
- Language: Silent (English intertitles)

The Winning Stroke is a lost 1919 silent American college drama film directed by Edward Dillon and starring George Walsh, a former Olympic athlete. Some filming took place at Yale University. The film was produced and distributed by Fox Film Corporation.

== Cast ==
- George Walsh as Buck Simmons
- Jane McAlpine as Aida Courtlandt
- John Leslie as Paul Browning
- William T. Hayes as Burton Hampdon
- Louis Este as 'Crickett' Perry
- John Woodford as The Dean (credited as Mr. Woodford)
- Sidney Marion as 'Chub' Winters
- Byron Douglas as The Head Coach
- Julien Beaubien as Undetermined Role

== See also ==
- 1937 Fox vault fire
