= With Stanley in Africa =

1922 film

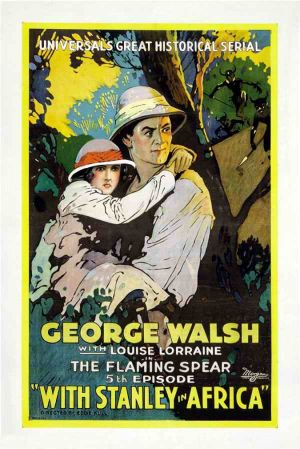
- Film poster for episode 5
- Directed by: William James Craft; Edward A. Kull
- Written by: George H. Plympton
- Starring: George Walsh; Louise Lorraine
- Distributed by: Universal Film Manufacturing Co.
- Release date: January 23, 1922
- Running time: 18 episodes
- Country: United States
- Language: Silent (English intertitles)

With Stanley in Africa is a 1922 American adventure film serial directed by William James Craft and Edward A. Kull and released by Universal Film Manufacturing Co. This serial is considered to be a lost film.

== Plot ==
Jack Cameron, an American scientist, is sent by the U.S. government to join Henry Morton Stanley's expedition to Africa in search of David Livingstone. During the journey, Cameron investigates the legendary White Tribe and the mysterious octopus plant while also seeking information about his missing father. Journalist Nadia Elkins joins the expedition, and the two encounter various dangers, including hostile locals, wildlife, and attempts to sabotage their mission.

== Cast ==
- George Walsh as Jack Cameron
- Louise Lorraine as Nadia Elkins
- Charles Mason as Reynard Lake
- William Welsh as Henry Morton Stanley
- Gordon Sackville
- Jack Mower
- Fred Kohler
- Joe King as David Livingston

== Chapter titles ==
1. Jaws of the Jungle
2. The Grip of the Slavers
3. Paths of Peril
4. Find Livingston
5. The Flaming Spear
6. Lost in the Jungle
7. Trail of the Serpent
8. Pool of Death
9. Menace of the Jungle
10. The Ordeal
11. The Lion's Prey
12. The Forest of Flame
13. Buried Alive
14. The Lair of Death
15. The Good Samaritan
16. The Slave's Secret
17. The White Tribe
18. Out of the Dark

== See also ==
- List of film serials
- List of film serials by studio
- List of lost films
