= The Passion Song =

1928 film

- Directed by: Harry O. Hoyt
- Written by: Camille Collins; Francis Fenton; Elizabeth Hayter
- Produced by: Samuel Zierler
- Starring: Gertrude Olmstead; Noah Beery; Gordon Elliott
- Cinematography: André Barlatier
- Edited by: Leonard Wheeler
- Production company: Excellent Pictures
- Distributed by: Excellent Pictures
- Release date: October 15, 1928
- Running time: 60 minutes
- Country: United States
- Languages: Silent; English intertitles

The Passion Song is a 1928 American silent drama film directed by Harry O. Hoyt and starring Gertrude Olmstead, Noah Beery and Gordon Elliott.

== Plot ==
In England, two former South African prospectors become involved in a love triangle.

== Cast ==
- Gertrude Olmstead as Elaine Van Ryn
- Noah Beery as John Van Ryn
- Gordon Elliott as Keith Brooke
- Edgar Washington Blue as Ulambo

== Bibliography ==
- Munden, Kenneth White. The American Film Institute Catalog of Motion Pictures Produced in the United States, Part 1. University of California Press, 1997.
