= The Pride of New York =

1917 film

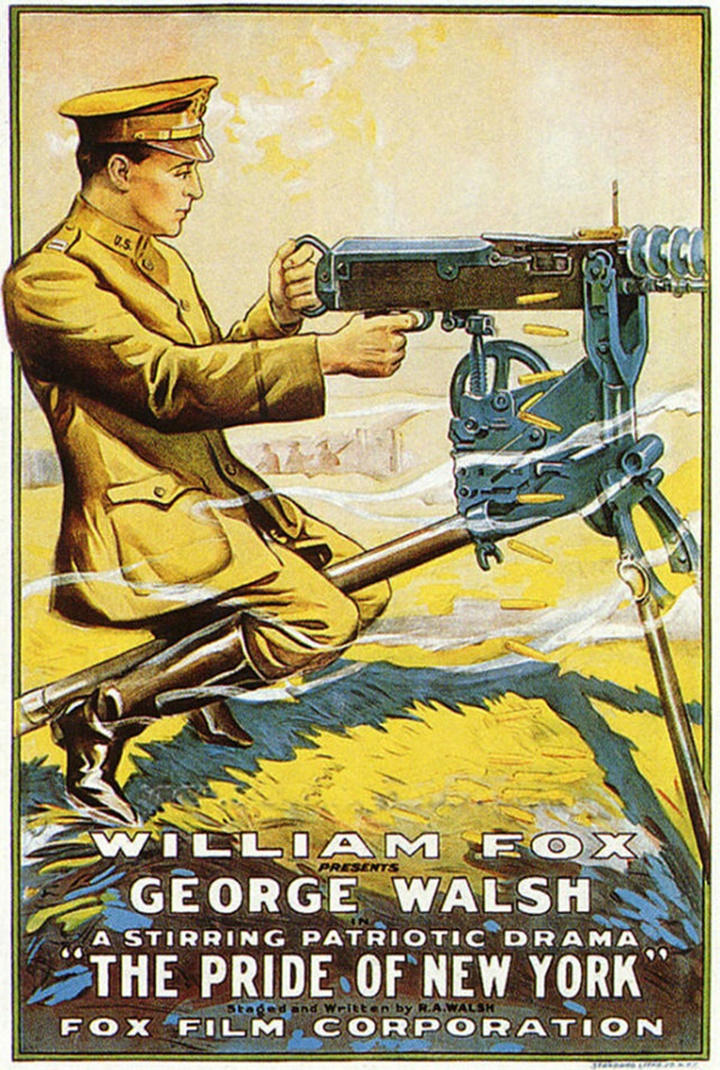
- Film poster
- Directed by: Raoul Walsh
- Written by: Raoul Walsh (scenario)
- Based on: a story for the screen by Ralph Spence
- Produced by: William Fox
- Cinematography: Dal Clawson
- Distributed by: Fox Film Corporation
- Release date: December 9, 1917
- Running time: 5 reels
- Country: United States
- Language: Silent (English intertitles)

The Pride of New York is a lost 1917 American silent war drama film directed by Raoul Walsh and starring his brother George Walsh. It was produced by and distributed through the Fox Film Corporation.

== Plot ==
As described in a film magazine, Jim Kelly (Walsh), a resident of New York City's Ninth Ward and a bricklayer, is one of the men selected in the first draft for World War I. He goes forth eagerly and his ability and daring soon win him a high rank in the army. Harold Whitley (Bailey), a wealthy idler and tango king, trains for a captaincy and wins it. His unfitness for such a position is soon discovered and he is reduced in rank. Jim's regiment goes to Europe and with the downing of six German airplanes and several minor victories to his credit he becomes the "Pride of New York." Pat, a young woman of New York's millionaire class, has gone to Europe to become a nurse. She meets Jim and becomes interested in him because of his bravery and patriotism. When Jim rescues her from the clutches of a German prince, she is grateful and naturally they fall in love.

== Cast ==
- George Walsh - Jim Kelly
- James A. Marcus - Pat Kelly
- William Bailey - Harold Whitley
- Regina Quinn - Mary

== Reception ==
Like many American films of the time, The Pride of New York was subject to cuts by city and state film censorship boards. The Chicago Board of Censors required cuts of the two intertitles "A very small percentage of these young men enlisted because of a desire for comfort rather than patriotism" and "Kill the men and help yourself to the women", closeup of German officer striking man's wounded foot, first two struggle scenes between German officer and nurse in living room, German officer unfastening sword and belt, attempting to unfasten coat, taking coat off, all struggle scenes between German officer and nurse in room where bed is shown including taking nurse to room and excluding other young woman, and the struggle between German officer and young woman on couch.

== See also ==
- 1937 Fox vault fire
