= Harry Chandlee =

American film producer

- Born: December 7, 1882; Washington, District of Columbia, United States
- Died: August 3, 1956 (aged 73); Los Angeles, California, United States
- Occupations: Writer, Producer, Editor
- Years active: 1914-1949 (film)

Harry Chandlee (1882–1956) was an American screenwriter and film editor and occasional producer. He co-wrote the screenplay for Sergeant York, which was nominated for the Academy Award for Best Original Screenplay at the 1941 Oscars.

During the late 1920s he briefly worked in Britain, editing Moulin Rouge for British International Pictures and The Woman in White for Herbert Wilcox.

== Selected filmography ==
=== Writer ===
- The Woman Pays (1915)
- A Magdalene of the Hills (1917)
- Bolshevism on Trial (1919)
- The Law of the Yukon (1920)
- Out of the Chorus (1921)
- Suspicious Wives (1921)
- One Law for the Woman (1924)
- The Man Without a Heart (1924)
- Those Who Judge (1924)
- Back to Life (1925)
- Lilies of the Streets (1925)
- Anything Once (1925)
- No Babies Wanted (1926)
- Broadway Madness (1927)
- A Bowery Cinderella (1927)
- Back to Liberty (1927)
- Women Who Dare (1928)
- Satan and the Woman (1928)
- The Stronger Will (1928)
- Inspiration (1928)
- A Bit of Heaven (1928)
- Reno (1930)
- Platinum Blonde (1931)
- The Dude Ranger (1934)
- Rainbow on the River (1936)
- Our Town (1940)
- Sergeant York (1941)
- Three Is a Family (1944)
- Rhapsody in Blue (1945)
- The Jolson Story (1946)
- Tarzan's Magic Fountain (1949)

=== Editor ===
- Moulin Rouge (1928)
- The Woman in White (1929)
- What a Man (1930)

== Bibliography ==
- Munden, Kenneth White. The American Film Institute Catalog of Motion Pictures Produced in the United States, Part 1. University of California Press, 1997.
