= William Bailey (actor) =

American actor (1886–1962)

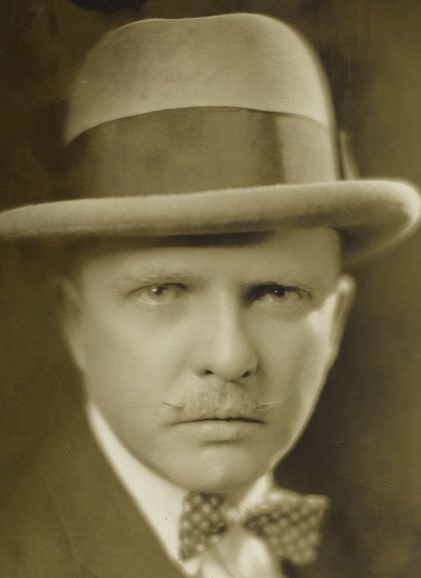
- Bailey in 1925
- Born: Gardner Warren Reineck; September 26, 1886; Omaha, Nebraska, U.S.
- Died: November 8, 1962 (aged 76); Hollywood, Los Angeles, California, U.S.
- Resting place: Holy Cross Cemetery, Culver City
- Occupations: Actor, director
- Years active: 1911–1959
- Spouses: Mary Cannon (m. 1917; died 1952) Aletha Hamilton (m. 1952–1962)

William Norton Bailey (born Gardner Warren Reineck; September 26, 1886 – November 8, 1962) was an American actor and director.

== Personal life ==
William Norton Bailey was born Gardner Warren Reineck on 26 September 1886 in Omaha, Nebraska. His parents, Rebecca Gardener Phillips and Jesse P. Reineck, his father was a Western Union telegraph operator. The family moved around the country based on Jesse’s work. The Reineck’s divorced after 1900 when Jesse was arrested, along with five other telegraph operators, for defrauding American Express. William's mother settled the family for a number of years in Milwaukee.

Bailey was married on 1917 in Philadelphia to Mary Cannon, an actress who worked under the professional names of Polly Vann and Mary/Polly Bailey. They had no children. After their marriage, William, his new wife, and his mother moved to New York City where he was a director at Vitagraph Studios. After her death in 1952, he married a second time to Mrs. Aletha Hamilton Fadden in Los Angeles. They died within a few months of each other and are buried at the Holy Cross Cemetery in Culver City, California.

== Film career ==
Bailey's initial work in motion pictures came with Cosmopolitan Pictures, for which he directed one-reel and two-reel films. Bailey appeared in more than 300 films between 1911 and 1959, but his roles were often uncredited. Bailey also starred in the original cast of No, No Nanette (1925), a smash hit on Broadway. Born in Omaha, Nebraska, Bailey died in Hollywood, California in 1962 at the age of 76.

== Selected filmography ==
| Year | Film | Role | Notes |
|---|---|---|---|
| 1911 | Mae's Suitors | A Suitor | |
| 1912 | The Snare | Tom Ransom | |
| 1912 | The Penitent | Hugh Thompson | |
| 1913 | Dear Old Girl | Friend of Ted Warren | |
| 1913 | The Love Lute of Romany | A Farmer | |
| 1914 | The Banker's Daughter | Harold Routledge | |
| 1915 | Her Husband's Honor | Secret Service Agent Ellen | |
| 1916 | A Coney Island Princess | Jan Kouver | |
| 1916 | A Million A Minute | Mark Seager | |
| 1917 | The Pride of New York | Harold Whitley | |
| 1918 | Bonnie Annie Laurie | Captain Donald McGrego | |
| 1918 | I'll Say So | August Myers | |
| 1919 | Speedy Meade | Cal Merchant | |
| 1920 | The Phantom Foe | Bob Royal | Credited as William Norton Bailey |
| 1921 | The Yellow Arm | Jerry Engleson | Credited as William N. Bailey |
| 1923 | Is Money Everything? | Roy Pelham | |
| 1923 | Three O'Clock in the Morning | Hugo von Strohm | |
| 1924 | The Flaming Forties | Desparde | Credited as William Norton Bailey |
| 1924 | The Uninvited Guest | Fred Morgan | |
| 1924 | The Cyclone Rider | | |
| 1924 | Winner Take All | Jim Devereaux | |
| 1925 | My Neighbor's Wife | Greed's Assistant | |
| 1925 | Bustin' Thru | Harvey Gregg | |
| 1926 | Lightning Bill | William W. Williams | |
| 1926 | The House Without a Key | Harry Jennison | Credited as William Norton Bailey |
| 1927 | The Masked Menace | | Credited as William Norton Bailey |
| 1928 | The Flyin' Cowboy | James Bell | |
| 1928 | The Way of the Strong | Tiger Louie | Credited as William N. Bailey |
| 1928 | Burning Bridges | Jim Black | Credited as William N. Bailey |
| 1929 | The Aviator | Brooks | Credited as William Norton Bailey |
| 1930 | Back Pay | Ed | |
| 1930 | Today | Gregory | |
| 1931 | An American Tragedy | Reporter in Courtroom | Uncredited |
| 1931 | Mata Hari | Dubois' Aide | Uncredited |
| 1932 | Midnight Patrol | Powers | |
| 1934 | Manhattan Melodrama | Al Barnes (croupier) | Uncredited |
| 1936 | I'll Name the Murderer | William Hugo Van Ostrum | |
| 1937 | London by Night | Scotland Yard Detective | Uncredited |
| 1939 | Miracles for Sale | Man in Box | Uncredited |
| 1940 | Bitter Sweet | Man in Bath | Uncredited |
| 1940 | British Intelligence | British Intelligence agent | Uncredited |
| 1944 | Mrs. Parkington | Musician at Ball | Uncredited |
| 1947 | The Egg and I | Reveler at Country Dance | Uncredited |
| 1948 | The Babe Ruth Story | Reporter | Uncredited |
| 1948 | Black Bart | Townsman | |
| 1948 | Silver Trails | John Chambers | |
| 1949 | Flamingo Road | Leo Mitchell | Uncredited |
| 1949 | Across the Rio Grande | Sheriff Reid | |
| 1949 | The Lone Ranger | Townsman Jim | TV, 1 episode |
| 1950 | Where Danger Lives | Man | Uncredited |
| 1951 | Flight to Mars | Coucilman | |
| 1951–1953 | The Range Rider | Indian Agent, Larson | TV, 2 episodes |
| 1952 | Clash by Night | Waiter | Uncredited |
| 1957 | A Hatful of Rain | Man | Uncredited |
| 1958 | Maverick | Banker, Doctor | TV, 2 episodes |
| 1959 | But Not for Me | Doorman | Uncredited |
