= Gladys Frazin =

American actress (1900–1939)

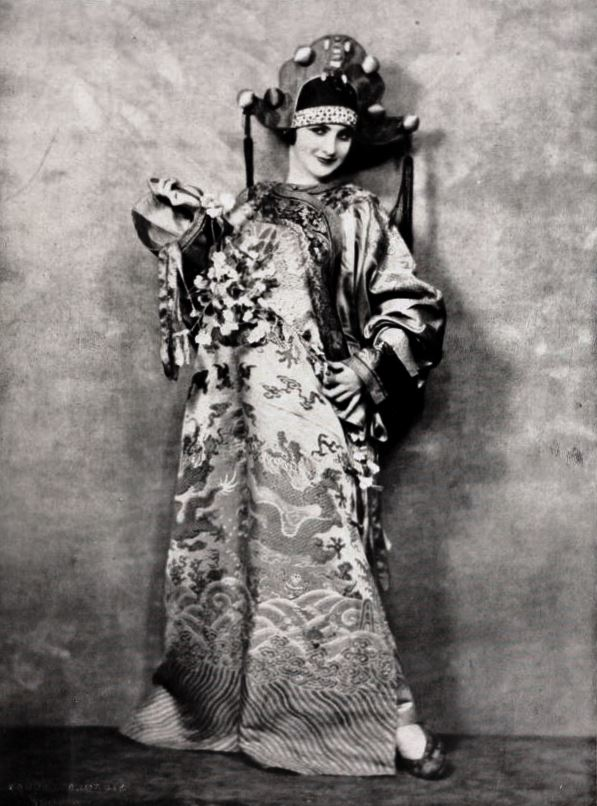
- From a 1923 magazine
- Born: June 21, 1900; Chicago, Illinois, U.S.
- Died: March 9, 1939 (aged 38); New York City, U.S.
- Occupation: Actress
- Years active: 1924–1931 (film)
- Spouses: Leo Lowenstein; Monty Banks (m. 1929; div. 1932)
- Children: 1

Gladys Frazin (June 21, 1900 – March 9, 1939) was an American stage and film actress. She appeared in a mixture of American and British films.

On Broadway, Frazin played Mimi in The Masked Woman (1922). Also on stage she featured in Edgar Wallace's 1930 West End hit On the Spot.

Frazin was the daughter of Mr. and Mrs. Louis Frazin. She was married to comedian Monty Banks, her fourth husband, from 1929 to 1932, when they divorced. Her first husband was Leo Lowenstein, and they had a son, Leo Lowenstein Jr.

On March 9, 1939, Frazin committed suicide by jumping out of a window of an apartment in New York City. She was 38.

== Filmography ==
- Let Not Man Put Asunder (1924)
- The Winning Oar (1927)
- Inspiration (1928)
- The Blue Peter (1928)
- Spangles (1928)
- The Return of the Rat (1929)
- The Compulsory Husband (1930)
- Kiss Me Sergeant (1930)
- The Other Woman (1931)

== Bibliography ==
- Munden, Kenneth White. The American Film Institute Catalog of Motion Pictures Produced in the United States, Part 1. University of California Press, 1997.
