= The Nest (1927 film) =

1927 film by William Nigh

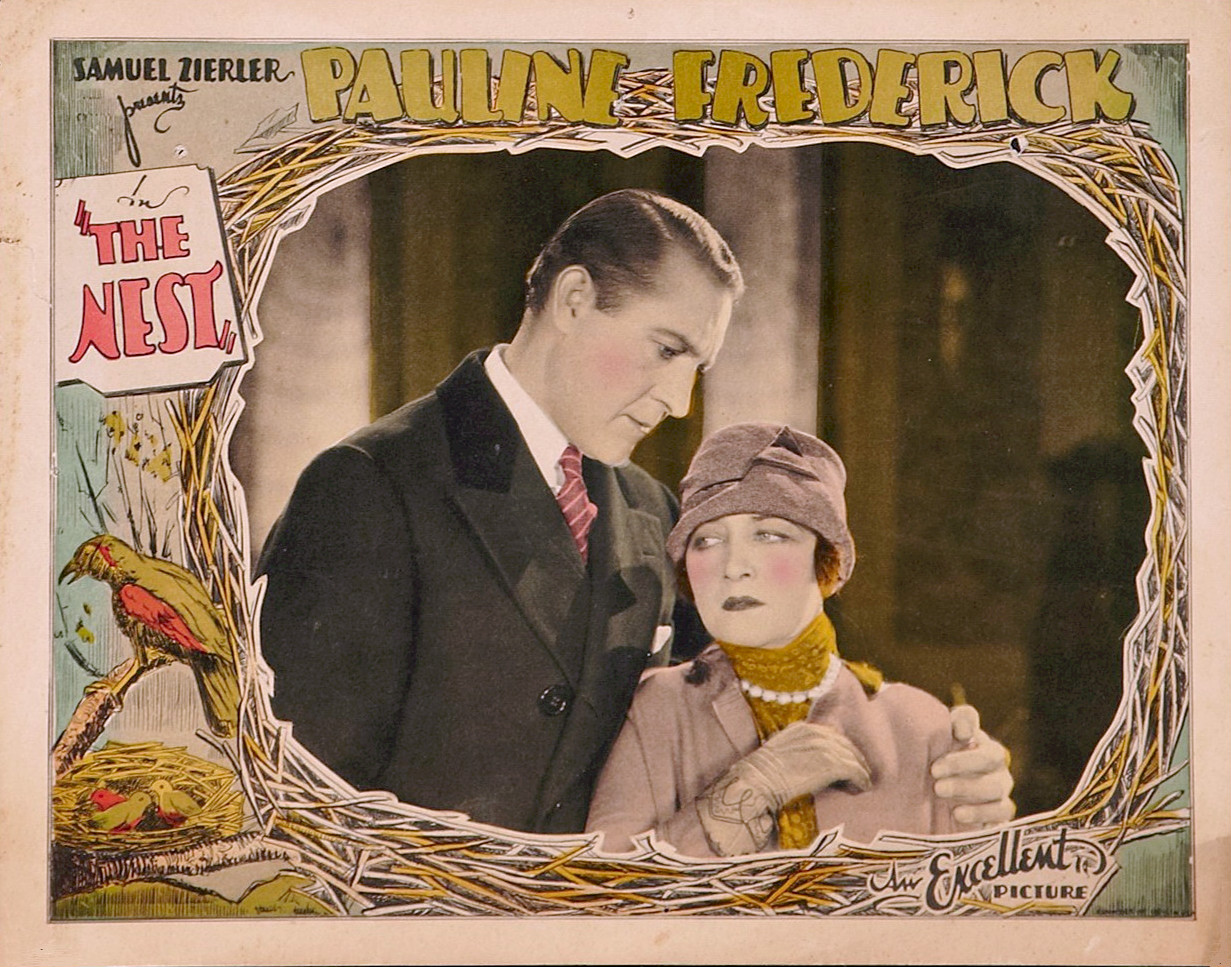
- Lobby card
- Directed by: William Nigh
- Written by: Charles E. Whittaker
- Based on: Les noces d'argent by Paul Géraldy
- Produced by: Samuel Zierler
- Starring: Pauline Frederick; Holmes Herbert
- Cinematography: John W. Brown; Harry Stradling Sr.
- Distributed by: Excellent Pictures
- Release date: September 1, 1927
- Running time: 8 reels
- Country: United States
- Language: Silent (English intertitles)

The Nest is a 1927 American silent drama film directed by William Nigh starring Pauline Frederick and Holmes Herbert. The screenplay by Charles E. Whittaker is based on the play Les noces d'argent by Paul Géraldy.

== Plot ==
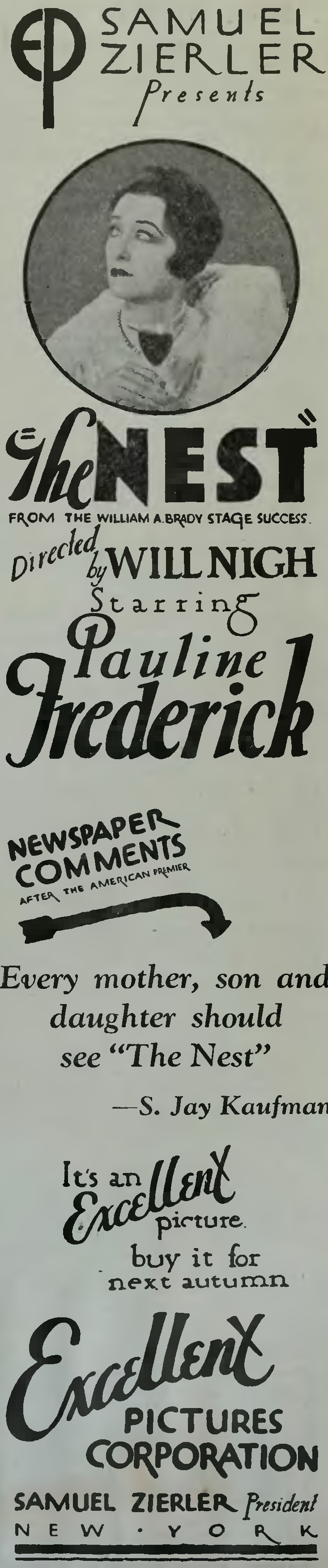
The Nest advertisement in The Film Daily, 1926

A mother discovers her daughter Susan is marrying an insufferable social-climber. Already horrified by the idea, she also finds out her son Martin has gone into a life of crime. She decides to head to Paris to forget about her domestic troubles. She marries Richard Elliot, the executor of her late husband's estate.

== Cast ==
- Pauline Frederick as Mrs. Hamilton
- Holmes Herbert as Richard Elliot
- Thomas Holding as Archer Hamilton
- Ruth Dwyer as Susan Hamilton
- Reginald Sheffield as Martin Hamilton
- Rolland Flander as Monroe
- Jean Acker as Belle Madison
- Wilfred Lucas as Howard Hardy

== Preservation ==
A print of The Nest is located in the Library and Archives Canada.
