= Broken Barriers (1928 film) =

1928 film directed by Burton L. King

- Directed by: Burton L. King
- Written by: Isadore Bernstein; Caroline F. Hayward
- Produced by: Samuel Zierler
- Starring: Helene Costello; Gaston Glass; Joseph W. Girard
- Cinematography: William Miller; Joseph Walters
- Edited by: De Leon Anthony
- Production company: Excellent Pictures
- Distributed by: Excellent Pictures
- Release date: December 1, 1928
- Running time: 70 minutes
- Country: United States
- Languages: Silent; English intertitles

Broken Barriers is a 1928 American silent drama film directed by Burton L. King and starring Helene Costello, Gaston Glass and Joseph W. Girard. The film is currently lost.

== Cast ==
- Helene Costello as Beryl Moore
- Gaston Glass as Charles Hill
- Joseph W. Girard as Stanley Moore
- Frank Beal as George Austin
- Carl Stockdale as Thomas Walker
- Frank Hagney as James Barker

== Bibliography ==
- Munden, Kenneth White. The American Film Institute Catalog of Motion Pictures Produced in the United States, Part 1. University of California Press, 1997.
