= The Laughing Lady (1929 film) =

1929 film by Victor Schertzinger

- Directed by: Victor Schertzinger
- Written by: Bartlett Cormack; Arthur Richman
- Based on: play, The Laughing Lady, by Alfred Sutro
- Produced by: Paramount Famous Lasky Corporation
- Starring: Ruth Chatterton; Clive Brook
- Cinematography: George J. Folsey
- Distributed by: Paramount Pictures
- Release date: December 28, 1929
- Running time: 80 minutes
- Country: United States
- Language: English

The Laughing Lady is a 1929 American sound film melodrama directed by Victor Schertzinger, starring Ruth Chatterton and produced and released by Paramount Famous Lasky Corporation. It is based on a 1922 British play, The Laughing Lady, by Alfred Sutro. The play was brought to New York in 1923 and put on Broadway starring Ethel Barrymore. The film "deal[s] with rape, divorce and hypocrisy in New York's high society".

A 1924 Paramount silent film retitled A Society Scandal starred Gloria Swanson, now lost, was the first adaptation of the play.

In 1930 a sound version, A Kacago Asszony, was produced by Paramount at its studio in Joinville, France, in Hungarian with a Hungarian director and cast. It was released in the US by Paramount in 1931.

Jeanne Eagels was to star in the film but died before production began.

== Cast ==
The film

- Ruth Chatterton – Marjorie Lee
- Clive Brook – Daniel Farr
- Dan Healy – Al Brown
- Nat Pendleton – James Dugan
- Raymond Walburn – Hector Lee
- Dorothy Hall – Flo
- Nedda Harrigan – Cynthia Bell (*as Hedda Harrigan)
- Lillian B. Tonge – Parker
- Marguerite St. John – Mrs. Playgate
- Hubert Druce – Hamilton Playgate
- Alice Hegeman – Mrs. Collop
- Joe King – City Editor
- Helen Hawley – Rose

== See also ==
- List of early sound feature films (1926–1929)
