= Dorothy Hall (scientist) =

Snow and ice scientist

Dorothy K. Hall
- Education: University of Maryland
- Scientific career
- Thesis: Analysis of the origin of water which forms large aufeis fields on the Arctic Slope of Alaska using ground and landsat data (1980)

Dorothy K. Hall is a scientific researcher known for her studies on snow and ice, which she studies through a combination of satellite data and direct measurements. She is a fellow of the American Geophysical Union.

== Education and career ==
Hall grew up near Washington, D.C. and was interested in the space program, astronomy, and geology. By high school, she had her pilot's license and was taking photographs from planes. In college, she combined these interests to pursue a degree in geographic sciences at the University of Maryland. Hall also earned her Ph.D. from the University of Maryland where she combined field measurements and satellite data to measure aufeis in Alaska.

Hall was a scientist at the National Aeronautics and Space Agency's (NASA) Goddard Space Flight Center, where she served as a scientist in the hydrology division from 1975 until 2003, with a promotion to Senior Scientist in 1989. Hall worked in the cryospheric sciences laboratory at NASA where she led the Moderate Resolution Imaging Spectroradiometer snow and ice imaging program. After retiring from NASA, Hall spent two years at Michigan State University before taking a visiting scientist position at the University of Maryland.

In 2018, Hall was elected a fellow of the American Geophysical Union who cited her "for pioneering, innovative, and sustained research for 44 years on global remote sensing of the Earth's cryosphere".

== Research ==
Hall is known for her research measuring the temperature of the snow and sea, and mapping its spatial extent. While at NASA, Hall worked on the Moderate Resolution Imaging Spectroradiometer (MODIS) instruments on the Terra satellite where she focused on the measurements of snow from space. Hall has also used the MODIS instruments on Terra and Aqua to measure the temperature of the ice surface. Hall's research on the surface temperature and extent of ice melt in Greenland has revealed widespread melting of Greenland ice over short periods of time. Her work during field expeditions includes direct measurements of snow and ice, which increases confidence in measurements made from space. Hall's research includes tracking of annual changes in snow levels and the timing of melt in areas including Wyoming, California, and Great Salt Lake in Utah.

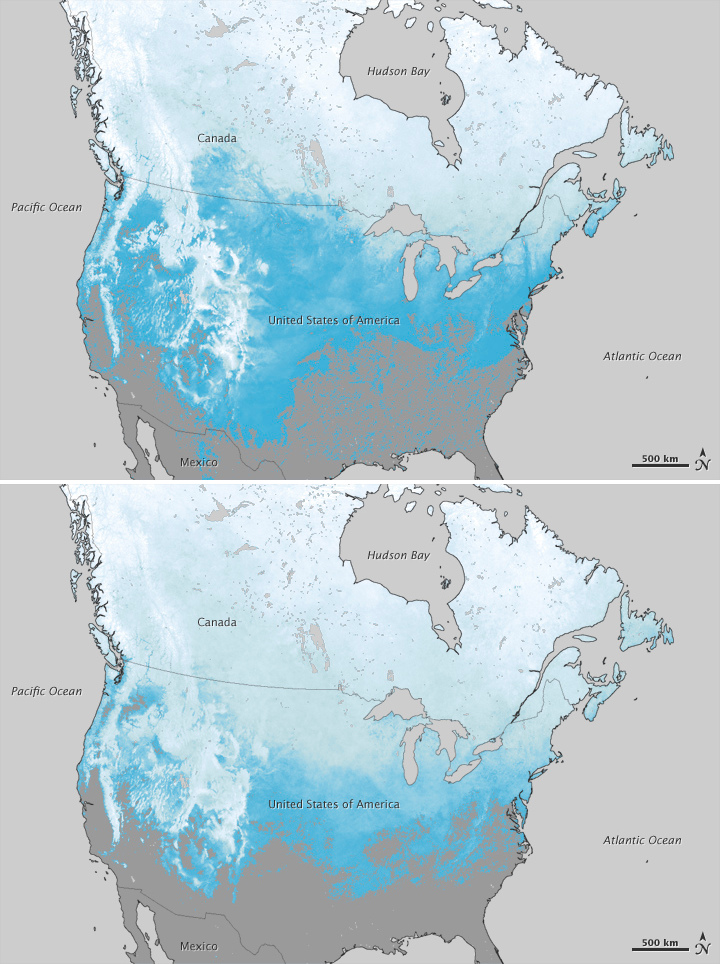
Decreased snow levels in the winter of 2011 to 2012 based on snow maps made by Hall using satellite data

=== Selected publications ===
- Hall, Dorothy K. (1985). Remote Sensing of Ice and Snow. Dordrecht: Springer Netherlands. ISBN 978-94-009-4842-6.
- Hall, Dorothy K.; Riggs, George A.; Salomonson, Vincent V. (November 1995). "Development of methods for mapping global snow cover using moderate resolution imaging spectroradiometer data". Remote Sensing of Environment. 54 (2): 127–140. Bibcode:1995RSEnv..54..127H. doi:10.1016/0034-4257(95)00137-P.
- Justice, C.O.; Vermote, E.; Townshend, J.R.G.; Defries, R.; Roy, D.P.; Hall, D.K.; Salomonson, V.V.; Privette, J.L.; Riggs, G.; Strahler, A.; Lucht, W.; Myneni, R.B.; Knyazikhin, Y.; Running, S.W.; Nemani, R.R.; Huete, A.R.; van Leeuwen, W.; Wolfe, R.E.; Giglio, L.; Muller, J.; Lewis, P.; Barnsley, M.J. (1 November 2002). "MODIS snow-cover products". Remote Sensing of Environment. 83 (1–2): 181–194. Bibcode:2002RSEnv..83..181H. doi:10.1016/S0034-4257(02)00095-0. hdl:2060/20010069265. ISSN 0034-4257. S2CID 129808147.
- Hall, Dorothy K; Riggs, George A; Salomonson, Vincent V; DiGirolamo, Nicolo E; Bayr, Klaus J (2002). "MODIS snow-cover products". Remote Sensing of Environment. 83 (1–2): 181–194. Bibcode:2002RSEnv..83..181H. doi:10.1016/S0034-4257(02)00095-0. hdl:2060/20010069265. S2CID 129808147.
- Hall, Dorothy K.; Bayr, Klaus J.; Schöner, Wolfgang; Bindschadler, Robert A.; Chien, Janet Y.L. (August 2003). "Consideration of the errors inherent in mapping historical glacier positions in Austria from the ground and space (1893–2001)". Remote Sensing of Environment. 86 (4): 566–577. Bibcode:2003RSEnv..86..566H. doi:10.1016/S0034-4257(03)00134-2.
- Hall, Dorothy K.; Riggs, George A. (2007). "Accuracy assessment of the MODIS snow products". Hydrological Processes. 21 (12): 1534–1547. Bibcode:2007HyPr...21.1534H. doi:10.1002/hyp.6715. S2CID 16797236.

== Awards and honors ==
- Exceptional Service Medal, NASA (2009)
- Fellow, American Geophysical Union (2018)
