= Samuel Zierler =

American film producer

- Born: March 5, 1895; Brooklyn, New York, United States
- Died: October 1964 (aged 69); California, United States
- Occupation: Producer
- Years active: 1923-1933 (film)

Samuel Zierler (1895–1964) was an American film producer of the silent and early sound era. As well as working for various studios, in the late 1920s he controlled his own production company, Excellent Pictures. His final film work was for RKO Pictures in 1933.

== Filmography ==
- Cordelia the Magnificent (1923)
- The Woman of Bronze (1923)
- A Wife's Romance (1923)
- A Man of Quality (1926)
- Striving for Fortune (1926)
- The Broadway Drifter (1927)
- The Winning Oar (1927)
- Your Wife and Mine (1927)
- His Rise to Fame (1927)
- Broadway Madness (1927)
- A Bowery Cinderella (1927)
- Back to Liberty (1927)
- The Nest (1927)
- Satan and the Woman (1928)
- The Stronger Will (1928)
- Women Who Dare (1928)
- Inspiration (1928)
- A Bit of Heaven (1928)
- Making the Varsity (1928)
- Manhattan Knights (1928)
- The Speed Classic (1928)
- Into No Man's Land (1928)
- Passion Song (1928)
- Life's Crossroads (1928)
- Broken Barriers (1928)
- Confessions of a Wife (1928)
- The Clean Up (1929)
- The Dream Melody (1929)
- One Splendid Hour (1929)
- Montmartre Rose (1929)
- Daughters of Desire (1929)
- The Talk of Hollywood (1929)
- The Costello Case (1930)
- She Got What She Wanted (1930)
- Hell Bound (1931)
- Women Go on Forever (1931)
- Command Performance (1931)
- Salvation Nell (1931)
- Men Are Such Fools (1932)
- Tomorrow at Seven (1933)
- Racetrack (1933)
- Goodbye Love (1933)
- Sailor Be Good (1933)

== Bibliography ==
- Munden, Kenneth White. The American Film Institute Catalog of Motion Pictures Produced in the United States, Part 1. University of California Press, 1997.
- Pitts, Michael R. Poverty Row Studios, 1929–1940: An Illustrated History of 55 Independent Film Companies, with a Filmography for Each. McFarland & Company, 2005.
