= Dorothy Hall (actress) =

American actress (1906–1953)

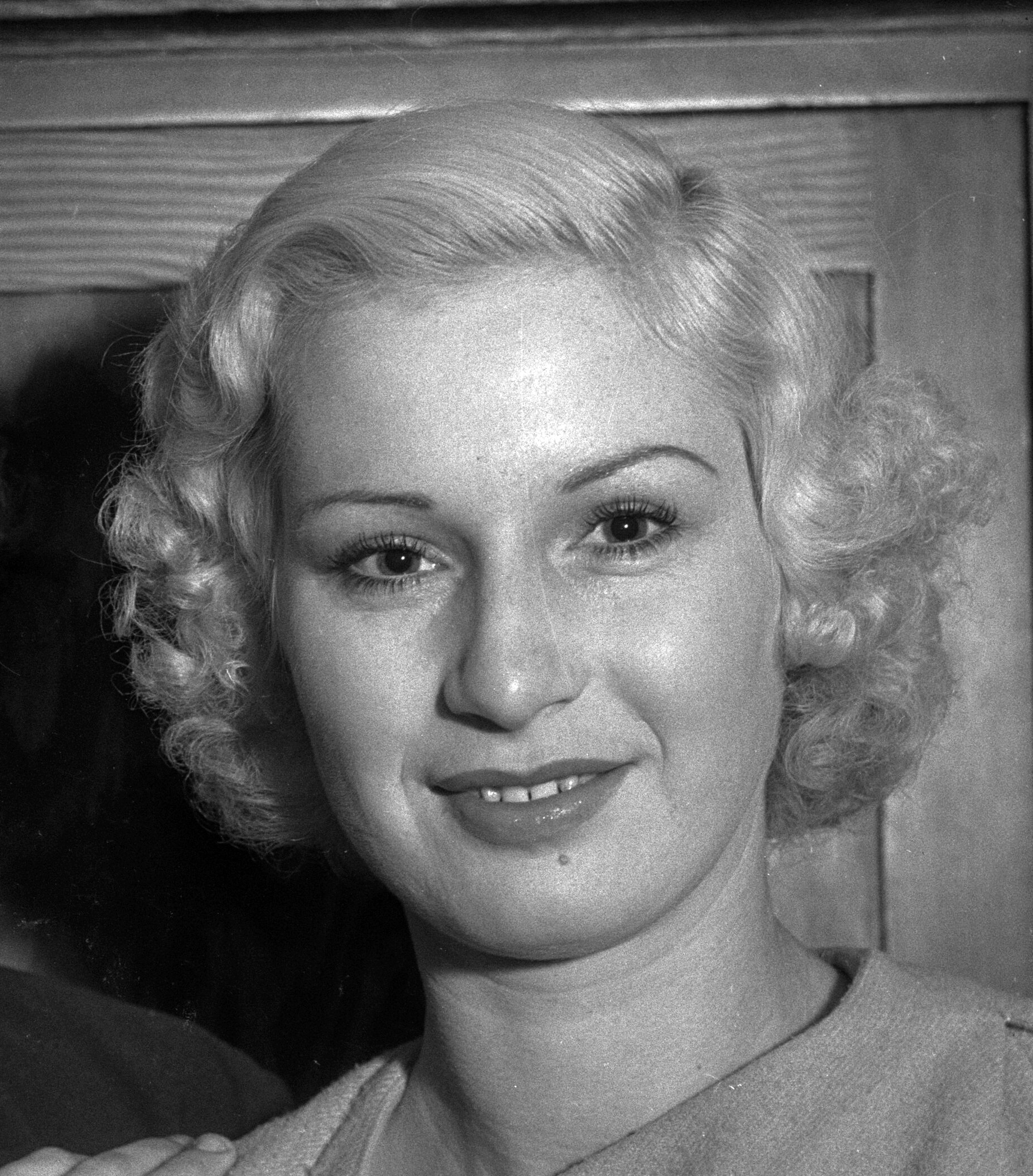
Hall in 1935

Dorothy Miller, better known by her stage name Dorothy Hall (December 3, 1906 – February 3, 1953), was an American actress in the late 1920s and early 1930s.

== Early years ==
Hall was born in Bradford, Pennsylvania. When she was young, her aunt had her harvest vegetables from a garden, clean them, and sell them door to door. The work earned her 5 cents per week, which she regularly spent to see films. Her parents eventually allowed her to go to New York, purportedly to study interior decorating, but she began going to a drama school. While there, she was discovered, which led to her first acting job.

== Career ==
She began her career as an actress in stock theater in Lancaster, Pennsylvania. During her early years on Broadway, she studied acting under Clare Tree Major.

After acting on Broadway and transitioned fully into film acting in the late 1920s. Broadway plays in which she appeared included Louisiana Purchase (1940), Behind Red Lights (1937), On Your Toes (1936), Page Miss Glory (1934), The Pure in Heart (1934), The Wooden Slipper (1934), Lilly Turner (1932), Child of Manhattan (1932), The Greeks Had a Word for It (1930), Flying High (1930), Other Men's Wives (1929), The Love Duel (1929), Precious (1929), Girl Trouble (1928), A Lady for a Night (1928), Speak Easy (1927), The Virgin Man (1927), and The Complex (1925).

Samuel Zierler, an independent producer, put Hall under contract to appear in The Broadway Drifter (1927).

She had small roles in films such as The Winning Oar (1927) and was later featured in the Vitaphone short In the Nick of Time (1929) and The Laughing Lady (1929). In 1929 or 1930, Hall signed with Paramount. Her final and best known film role was in Dorothy Arzner's Working Girls (1931) where she plays Mae Thorpe.

In 1941, Hall shifted from acting to writing plays. Her initial effort, Yesterday's Tomorrow, was tried out at the Pine Grove Theater in Cambridge Springs, Pennsylvania.

== Personal life and death ==
Hall was married to Neal Andrews, who headed the cosmetic manufacturing company Inecto, Inc. In September 1932, they agreed to a separation after six years of marriage, and they later were divorced. She later wed diamond merchant Albert D. Heath, and they were still married when she died.

Hall died on February 3, 1953, age 46, in St. Luke's Hospital in New York City.

== Filmography ==
- The Price of Possession (1921), silent film
- The Broadway Drifter (1927)
- The Winning Oar (1927)
- Back to Liberty (1927)
- Nothing But the Truth (1929), sound film
- In the Nick of Time (1929)
- The Laughing Lady (1929)
- Working Girls (1931)
