= Bernard McEveety =

American film director (1924–2004)

- Born: Bernard E. McEveety, Jr. May 13, 1924; New Rochelle, New York, U.S.
- Died: February 2, 2004 (aged 79); Encino, Los Angeles, California, U.S.
- Occupation: Film director

Bernard E. McEveety, Jr. (May 13, 1924 – February 2, 2004) was an American film and television director.

== Family ==
McEveety was born in New Rochelle, New York. His brothers Vincent McEveety and Joseph McEveety were also Hollywood directors and producers. His nephew is producer Stephen McEveety, who often collaborates with Mel Gibson (The Passion of the Christ).

== Career ==
McEveety worked primarily in TV, but also directed several feature films. He directed The Brotherhood of Satan and Ride Beyond Vengeance, and did second-unit work on another cult horror film, The Return of Dracula. McEveety's huge TV output included 31 episodes of the TV series Combat!. He also directed Jodie Foster in her debut film, Disney's Napoleon and Samantha.

He produced the TV series Cimarron Strip, which he often directed, as well. His Western directing credits include such television series as Rawhide, Gunsmoke, Bonanza, The Virginian, The Big Valley, and Young Maverick, and the miniseries How the West Was Won. His other credits include In the Heat of the Night, Airwolf, Blue Thunder, Knight Rider, Vega$, The Fall Guy, Simon & Simon, Buck Rogers in the 25th Century, Eight Is Enough, Petrocelli, Three for the Road, The Incredible Hulk, The Dukes of Hazzard, and Charlie's Angels, among others.

== Death ==
McEveety died in Encino, Los Angeles, California, aged 79, of undisclosed natural causes, survived by his wife, children and grandchildren.
