= Genies in popular culture =

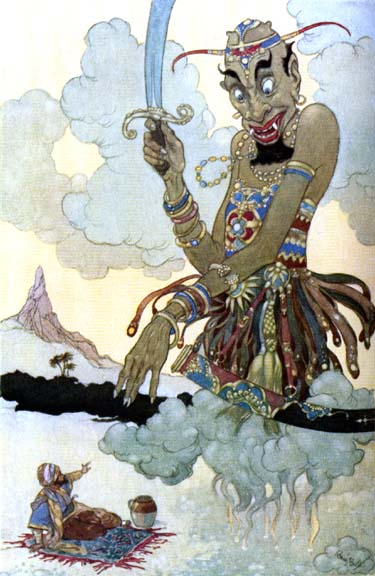
1898 illustration of The Fisherman and the Jinni by René Bull

Genies or djinns are supernatural creatures from pre-Islamic and Islamic mythology. They are associated with shapeshifting, possession and madness. In later Western popular representation, they became associated with wish-granting and often live in magic lamps or bottles. They appear in One Thousand and One Nights and its adaptations, among other stories. The wish-granting djinns from One Thousand and One Nights, however, are the divs of Persian origin, not the Arabian djinns.

== Terminology ==
Djinn is the original term. Genie was first used in the 1704 French translation of One Thousand and One Nights by Antoine Galland and is mostly associated with wish-granting djinns. The terms Ifrit and marid typically refer to evil djinns.

== History ==
Among the earliest depictions in fiction are the tales collated in One Thousand and One Nights. Following its translation into European languages in the early 18th century, djinns or genies started appearing in Western literature. These Western portrayals were often influenced by Orientalism. In the 20th century, djinns started appearing in film and television. The 1964 film The Brass Bottle and the 1965–1970 television sitcom I Dream of Jeannie it inspired represented a turning point in genies being portrayed more comedically.

== Attributes ==
Genies have been depicted in different ways depending on time and location. A central trait is that of shapeshifting. In Western portrayals in particular, they grant wishes, sometimes corrupting the wishes by interpreting them overly literally. They are often depicted as living or being trapped in various types of containers such as lamps, bottles, or jars. They are variously portrayed as good or evil.

== Depictions ==
Djinns and genies have appeared in diverse genres including comedy, horror, and musicals. The mid-10th century story The Case of the Animals versus Man uses a djinn for political allegory. Djinns are depicted in the frame story of One Thousand and One Nights as well as several of the tales within, including "The Fisherman and the Jinni" where a fisher finds a djinn in a jar and forces it to help him and "The Second Kalandar's Tale" where a djinn kidnaps a newlywed woman. The tale of Aladdin, which was not originally included in One Thousand and One Nights, is a famous story of genies being helpful that has been adapted numerous times including as the 1961 film The Wonders of Aladdin and the 1992 animated film Aladdin. The 1879 poem "The Khan's Devil" by John Greenleaf Whittier uses an evil genie as a symbolic representation of alcoholism. Fantasy stories of wish fulfillment occasionally depict the release of djinns sealed away long ago, as in the 1883 short story "Containing Mrs Shelmire's Djinn" by Max Adeler and the 1945 novel Miss Carter and the Ifrit by Susan Alice Kerby.

Films adapting or inspired by One Thousand and One Nights, such as the 1940 film The Thief of Bagdad, frequently feature genies. Genies also appear in stories set in the present, including the 1945 film Where Do We Go from Here? where an inept genie repeatedly fails to fulfil wishes, the 1900 novel The Brass Bottle by Thomas Anstey Guthrie and its multiple adaptations, and the 1963 The Twilight Zone episode "I Dream of Genie" where a man wishes to become a genie. Comedic portrayals of genies, popularized in the 1960s, later appeared in the 1996 film Kazaam where a genie lives in a boombox and the aforementioned 1992 film Aladdin. Malevolent djinns appear in the 1987 film The Outing and several computer games. The 1997 film Wishmaster depicts a malevolent djinn and outright rejects the comedic portrayals in I Dream of Jeannie and the 1992 version of Aladdin.

Rachel Caine's Weather Warden series that begins with the 2003 novel Ill Wind depicts a human being resurrected as a djinn. In the Bartimaeus Sequence by Jonathan Stroud, beginning with the 2003 novel The Amulet of Samarkand, a djinn has a human apprentice. The 2008 novel The Bastard of Istanbul by Elif Shafak portrays two djinns—one good and one evil. In the 2013 science fiction novel HWJN by Ibraheem Abbas and Yasser Bahjatt, djinns reside in a parallel dimension, and one of them has a romantic relationship with a human.

== See also ==
- Devil in the arts and popular culture
- Three wishes joke
