= The Brass Bottle =

The Brass Bottle may refer to:

- The Brass Bottle (novel), a 1900 novel by Thomas Anstey Guthrie under the pen name F. Anstey. It had three film adaptations:
- The Brass Bottle (1914 film), a British silent fantasy film
- The Brass Bottle (1923 film), an American silent fantasy comedy film
- The Brass Bottle (1964 film), an American fantasy film
