= The Last Outlaw =

The Last Outlaw may refer to:

- The Last Outlaw (1919 film), an American Western silent film
- The Last Outlaw (1927 film), an American Western silent film
- The Last Outlaw (1936 film), an American Western film
- The Last Outlaw (1993 film), an American Western television film
- The Last Outlaw (miniseries), a 1980 Australian miniseries based on the life of Ned Kelly
