= Alf's Button =

Alf's Button may refer to:

- Alf's Button (novel), a 1920 novel by W.A. Darlington
- Alf's Button (play), a 1924 play based on the novel
- Alf's Button (1920 film), a 1920 silent film adaptation
- Alf's Button (1930 film), a 1930 sound film adaptation
- Alf's Button Afloat, a 1938 comedy film
