= Edward Rose =

English playwright

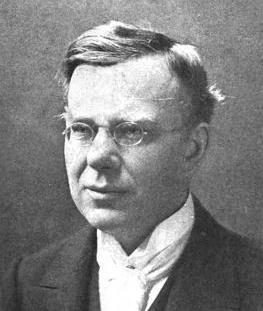
- Rose, c. 1873
- Born: 7 August 1849; Swaffham, Norfolk, England
- Died: 31 December 1904 (aged 55)
- Occupations: Playwright, Theatre Critic
- Spouse: Elizabeth Ann Gould
- Children: Lucy Rose (b. 1888), Dorothy Rose (b. 1889)
- Relatives: Charles Scott Sherrington (Half-brother)

Edward Rose (7 August 1849 – 31 December 1904) was an English playwright, best known for his adaptations of novels for the stage, mainly The Prisoner of Zenda. He was also the theatre critic for The Sunday Times.

== Biography ==
Edward Rose was born in Swaffham, Norfolk, on 7 August 1849, son of Caleb Rose, a physician, and his first wife, Isabella Morse. He attended Islington Proprietary School and Ipswich Grammar School. He worked in the solicitors firm Cobbold and Yarrington (in Ipswich) for four years, from 1868 to 1872. In 1872 he moved to London.

He began writing plays in 1869, and first had a play – Our Farm – produced in London in 1872. He was a regular contributor to the Illustrated London News, specifically, the English Homes series, and was the theatre critic for the Sunday Times starting in 1894 and continuing until at least 1897. His greatest success as a playwright came in 1896 with the premiere of his adaption of The Prisoner of Zenda. He later adapted other works of Anthony Hope, but none reached the same level of success.

He married Elizabeth Ann Gould, and had two daughters, Lucy and Dorothy. His elder daughter, Lucy, died when she was ten, and in her memory Rose endowed a research post at the London School of Economics and paid for the education of a board school girl.

He served for a while as the Vice-President of the Playgoer's Club, and was a member of the Fabian Society. He "took an active interest in the founding of Letchworth Garden City."

In 1902, Rose published The Rose Reader "a new way of teaching to read," that used only words that were spelled the way they sounded, in order to develop the love of reading before complicating the process.

Edward Rose died on 31 December 1904 at the age of 55.

=== Confusion with Edward Everett Rose ===
He is sometimes confused or conflated with Edward Everett Rose (1862–1939), a Canadian-born American dramatist also known for dramatizing novels, notably Richard Carvel and the Penrod stories of Booth Tarkington.

== Partial bibliography ==
- Our Farm (1st perf. 29 June 1872)
- Columbus: A Historical Play in Five Acts (published 1873)
- A Congress at Paris (1st perf. July 1878)
- Incognita (1st perf. 17 February 1879)
- Wild Flowers: A Dramatic Sketch in One Act (published 1880)
- Mad (1st perf. 12 June 1880)
- The Marble Arch: a Comedietta in One Act (published 1882) (with A. J. Garraway) (adapted from Die Versucherin by Gustav von Moser)
- Vice Versa; A Lesson to Fathers (1st perf. 9 April 1883) (Adapted from the novel by F. Anstey)
- Equals: a Comedy in Three Acts (2 July 1883) (Adapted from Le Gendre de Monsieur Poirier by Émile Augier)
- Odd, to Say the Least of It (1886)
- A Girl Graduate: a Varsity Idyll (1st perf. 28 June 1886)
- Her Father (1st perf. 16 May 1889) (with J. Douglass) (adapted from Conflicto Entre dos Deberes by José Echegaray)
- The Adventurers (1st perf. 24 June 1892) (Adapted from L'Aventuriere by Émile Augier)
- Agatha Tylden, Merchant and Shipowner (1st perf. 17 October 1892)
- The Babble Shop; or, Lord Wyndhamere's Fan (1st perf. 30 March 1893)
- The Prisoner of Zenda: A Romantic Play in Prologue and Four Acts (7 January 1896) (Adapted from the novel by Anthony Hope)
- Under the Red Robe (1st perf. 17 October 1896) (Adapted from the novel by Stanley J. Weyman)
- Phroso; A Drama of Adventure in Four Acts (published 1898) (with H. V. Esmond) (Adapted from the novel by Anthony Hope)
- In Days of Old (1st perf. 16 April 1899)
- English Nell (1st perf. 21 August 1900) (Adapted from Anthony Hope's novel Simon Dale)
- Grandmamma (1st perf. 22 March 1904)
