= Herman Finck =

British composer and conductor

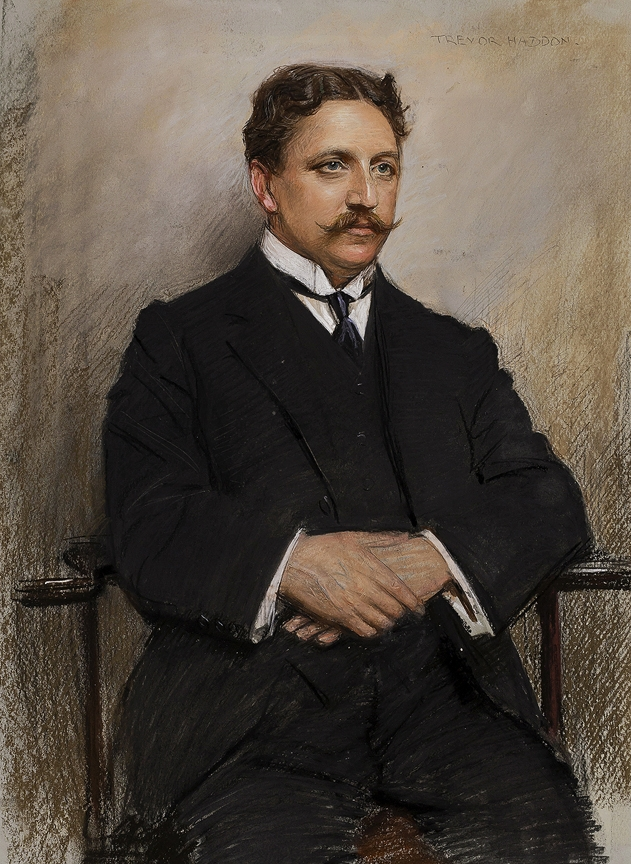
- Pastel portrait of Finck (1939) by Arthur Trevor Haddon
- Born: Hermann Van Der Vinck; 4 November 1872; London, England
- Died: 21 April 1939 (aged 66)
- Education: Guildhall School of Music and Drama
- Occupations: Composer; Conductor
- Employer(s): Palace Theatre, London (1900-1920)
- Known for: First recorded album

Herman Finck (4 November 1872 – 21 April 1939) was a British composer and conductor of Dutch extraction.

Born Hermann Van Der Vinck in London, he began his studies training at the Guildhall School of Music and Drama and established a career as the musical director at the Palace Theatre in London (from 1900 until 1920), with whose orchestra he made many virtuoso recordings. During these decades, he was also a principal conductor at the Queen's Theatre, at Theatre Royal, Drury Lane and at Southport. Finck was a prolific composer throughout the 1910s and 1920s. He composed around thirty theatre shows of most types - operettas (such as Decameron Nights), ballets (like My Lady Dragon Fly), incidental music, revues (annual revues Round the Map and The Passing Show were especially popular), plus songs, "mood music" for the silent cinema and many light orchestral pieces - suites such as Vive La Danse and Marie Antoinette, marches such as Pageant March, Guards Parade March, Splendour and Victory and the individual genre movements Dancing Daffodils, Dignity and Impudence, Land of Roses, Penguin Parade and Queen of the Flowers.

Finck also conducted the first record album ever made (in 1909) of Tchaikovsky's Nutcracker Suite.

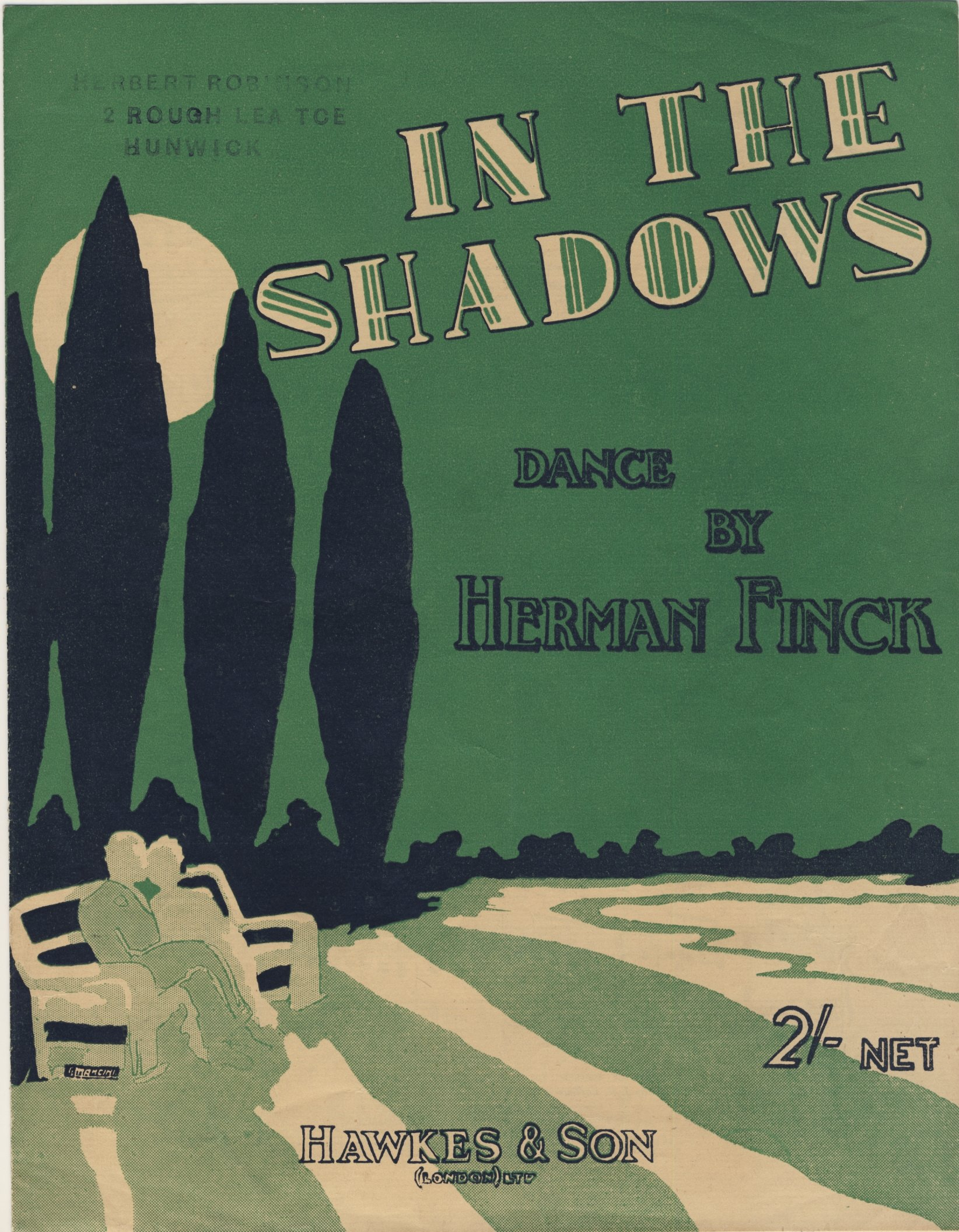
Cover of the sheet music for 'In the Shadows' (1910)

The Palace Theatre was famous not only for its orchestra, but also for the Palace Girls, who had many dances composed by Finck in their honour. In 1911 the Palace Girls performed a song and dance number, which was originally called "Tonight", but became hugely popular as a romantic instrumental piece "In The Shadows". This is the most enduring composition of Finck, largely because "In The Shadows" was one of the last numbers played on the Titanic and has thus made its way into several Titanic-collections.

Another popular song, during the World War I was "Gilbert the Filbert" (also called "The K-Nuts"). It was performed in The Passing Show of 1914 by the popular Basil Hallam, who became Captain B. H. Radford and died in 1916 when his parachute failed to open.

Finck also conducted the first London stage production of Show Boat, in 1928. This was the first production of Show Boat to include Paul Robeson in its cast.

His illustrated autobiography, "My melodious memories" was published in 1937.

The Divine Art Recordings Group (UK and USA) released on its Diversions label, in February 2012, the first CD album dedicated to the music of Herman Finck, performed by the orchestra and principals of the Bel-Etage Theatre from Estonia, conducted by Mart Sander. In addition to Finck's most popular tunes "Gilbert the Filbert" and "In The Shadows" (vocal version), this CD also includes several popular dances, patriotic World War I songs and hits from the revues and musicals, as well as two full orchestral suites - My Lady Dragonfly and the magnificently symphonic Decameron Nights, which had not had a revival since 1923.

In 2012, Divine Music CD label released The Finck Album, the first modern recording of Finck's music, performed by the principals and orchestra of the Bel-Etage Theatre in Tallinn, Estonia, conducted by Mart Sander.

== Selected filmography ==
- The Old Curiosity Shop (1934)
