= The Sunset Trail (1924 film) =

1924 film

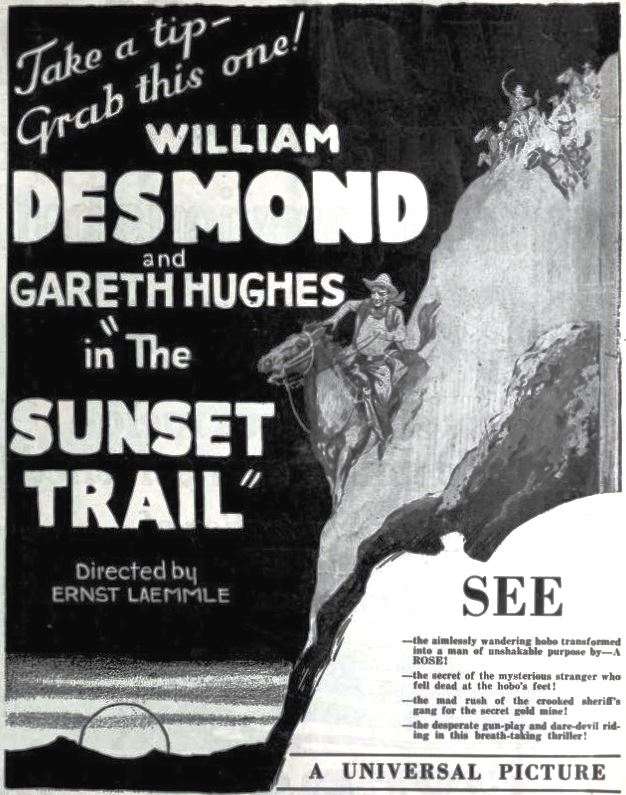
- Directed by: Ernst Laemmle
- Written by: Isadore Bernstein; Wyndham Gittens
- Based on: Overland Red, a Romance of the Moonstone Cañon Trail; 1914 novel by Henry Herbert Knibbs
- Starring: William Desmond; Gareth Hughes; Lucille Hutton
- Cinematography: Jackson Rose
- Production company: Universal Pictures
- Distributed by: Universal Pictures
- Release date: November 2, 1924
- Running time: 5 reels
- Country: United States
- Languages: Silent; English intertitles

The Sunset Trail is a 1924 American silent Western film directed by Ernst Laemmle and starring William Desmond, Gareth Hughes, and Lucille Hutton.

== Cast ==
- William Desmond as Happy Hobo
- Gareth Hughes as Collie King
- Lucille Hutton as Louise Lacharme
- S.E. Jennings as Silent Saunders
- Clark Comstock as Constable Hicks
- Albert J. Smith as Dick Fenlow
- William Steele as Brand William

== Preservation ==
With no prints of The Sunset Trail located in any film archives, it is a lost film.

== Bibliography ==
- Munden, Kenneth White. The American Film Institute Catalog of Motion Pictures Produced in the United States, Part 1. University of California Press, 1997.
