= Little Eve Edgarton =

1916 silent film

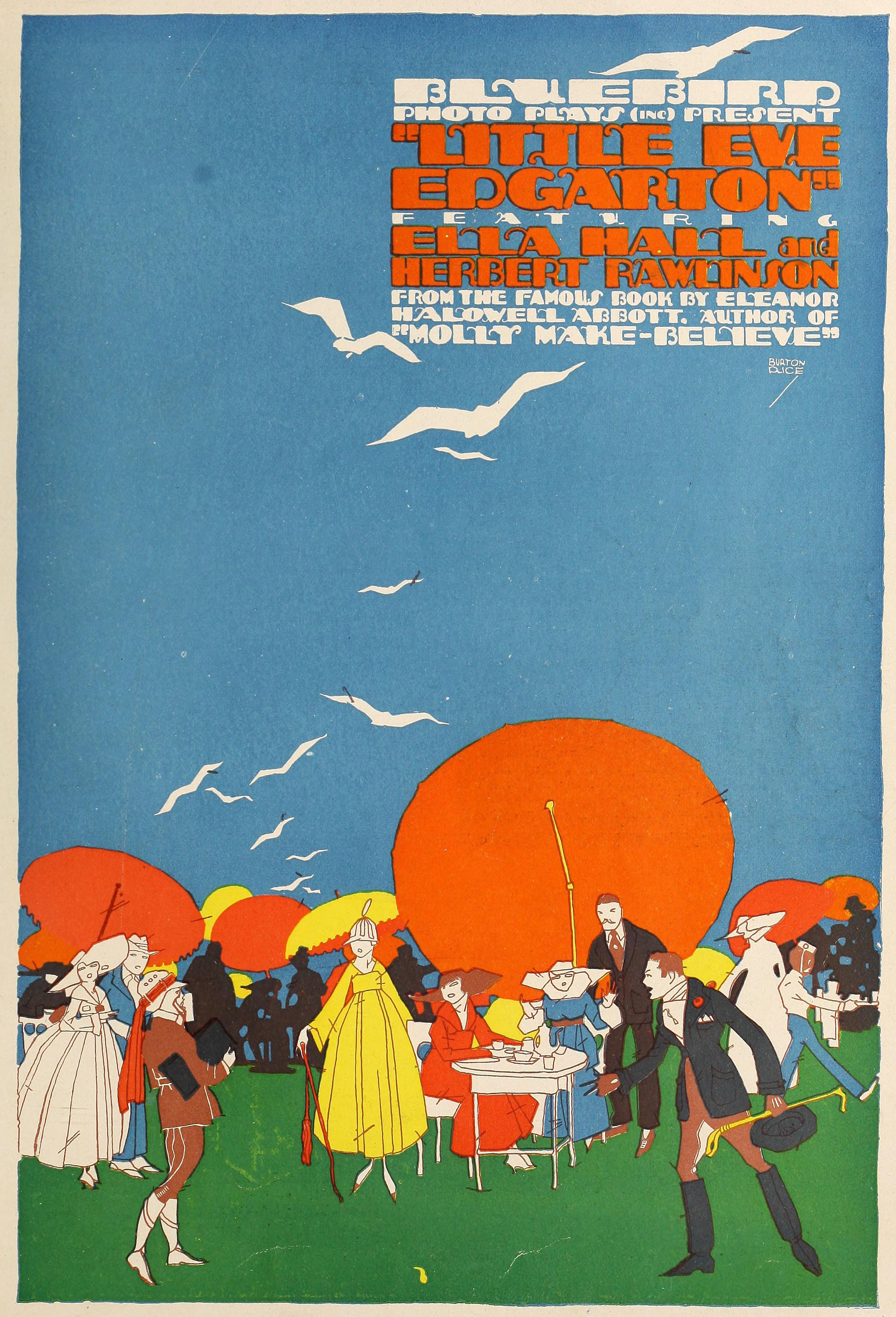
- Directed by: Robert Z. Leonard
- Written by: Eleanor Hallowell Abbott (novel); Robert Z. Leonard
- Starring: Ella Hall; Doris Pawn; Gretchen Lederer
- Cinematography: R.E. Irish
- Production company: Universal Pictures
- Distributed by: Universal Pictures
- Release date: August 21, 1916
- Running time: 50 minutes
- Country: United States
- Languages: Silent; English intertitles

Little Eve Edgarton is a 1916 American silent comedy film directed by Robert Z. Leonard and starring Ella Hall, Doris Pawn and Gretchen Lederer.

== Cast ==
- Ella Hall as Eve Edgarton
- Doris Pawn as Miss Van Eaton
- Gretchen Lederer as Cousin Elsa
- Herbert Rawlinson as James Barton
- Thomas Jefferson as Paul R. Edgarton
- Mark Fenton as John Elbertson

== Production ==
Several scenes for Little Eve Edgarton were filmed at Hotel del Coronado.

== Bibliography ==
- Paul C. Spehr & Gunnar Lundquist. American Film Personnel and Company Credits, 1908-1920. McFarland, 1996.
