= Alf's Button (novel) =

1920 comic novel by William Aubrey Darlington

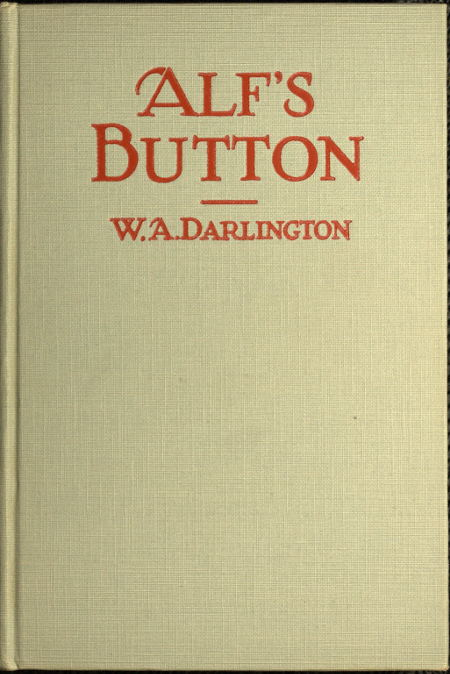
- Author: W.A. Darlington
- Language: English
- Publication date: 1920
- Publication place: United Kingdom
- OCLC: 6620144

Alf's Button is a 1920 British comic novel written by William Aubrey Darlington. A soldier in the British Army comes across a magic button which summons a genie to grant his wishes. It drew inspiration from Thomas Anstey Guthrie's 1900 novel The Brass Bottle.

== Adaptations ==
In 1920, the book was adapted into a silent film, Alf's Button, which starred Leslie Henson and was directed by W.P. Kellino. The success of the film significantly boosted the book's sales.

Darlington adapted his novel for a 1924 play of the same name.

In 1930, a sound film adaptation, Alf's Button, was released, also directed by Kellino.

A third film based on the story Alf's Button Afloat was released in 1938, directed by Marcel Varnel and starring Bud Flanagan and Chesney Allen.

== Bibliography ==
- Darlington, William Aubrey (2010). Alf's Button (1920). Kessinger. ISBN 978-1164323792.
