= Velma Whitman =

American actress (1885–1937)

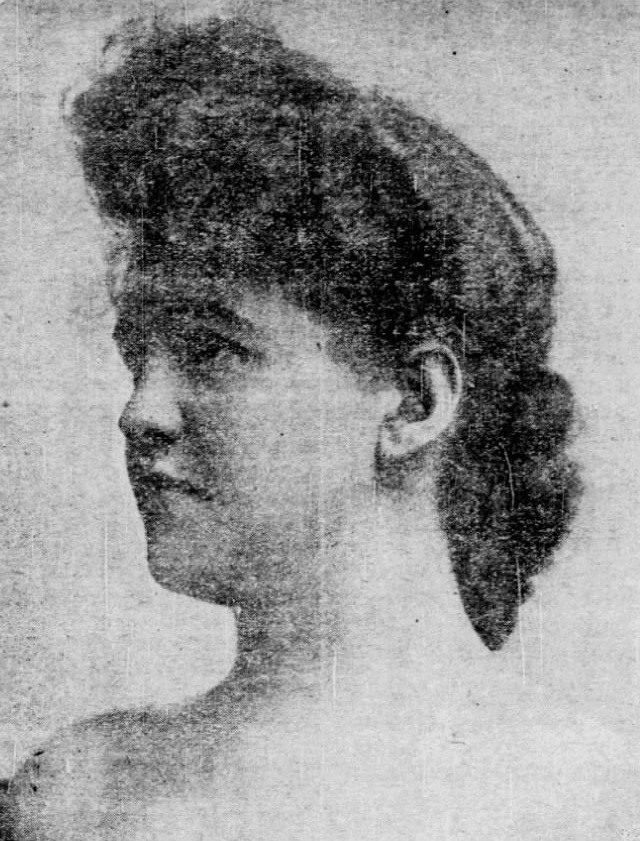
- Whitman c. 1907
- Born: Velma Virginia Barger; December 6, 1885; Portage Township, Hancock County, Ohio, US
- Died: July 18, 1937 (aged 51); Los Angeles, California, US
- Occupation: Actor
- Years active: 1905–1919
- Known for: Whitman's Comedians; Silent films
- Notable work: The Mysterious Model

Velma Virginia Whitman (December 6, 1885 – July 18, 1937) was an American actress who appeared in comedy theatre and silent films during the 1900s and 1910s. A Virginian, she began appearing in theatre roles in 1905 and became known for her portrayal of complicated emotional characters. After appearing with multiple different theatre groups, she established her own in 1906 named Whitman's Comedians, and acted as the leading woman for most performances, alongside her husband as the leading man. The large theatre company became well known throughout the American South for its numerous and varied plays up through 1910.

Performing with other companies once again from 1911 through 1912, including her husband's newly formed theatre company named Own Stock, she moved to California in 1913 and began appearing in a large number of silent films in the just-formed field of motion pictures. She became a lead performer for Siegmund Lubin's Lubin Manufacturing Company and had dozens of major roles up through 1919.

== Early life ==
Velma Virgnina Barger was born on December 6, 1885 in the Portage Township, Hancock County, Ohio. Her parents were Rose Belle (née Gorrell) and Lewis Barger. When she was a young girl, her family moved to Findley, Ohio where her father worked for the nearly opened Marvin Theater. The family lived in the northside of Findley in a house owned by theater owner William Marvin. Whitman's first role was in a performance at the Marvin Theater.

After her parents' divorce, her mother remarried and became Mrs. Frank Underwood and lived in Kansas City, Missouri. Her father also remarried and moved to Goldboro, North Carolina around 1903.

She married Fred S. Whitman of Findley in Newport, Ohio on August 1, 1902.

== Career ==
=== Early roles ===
Whitman started her theatrical career after joining the C.S. Sullivan theatre company and starring in the 1905 production of Dora Thorne in the titular role, based on the novel of the same name by Charlotte Mary Brame. The Twice-a-Week Plain Dealer referred to Whitman's role as highly demanding, where a "less talented woman would fail" in the emotional range needed for the character, but she managed to give a "most worthy portrayal". After having worked with the Boler Stock Company in Denver at the end of 1905, she then joined the Crawford's Comedians group for a 1906 production of Under Two Flags from the novel by Ouida, where Whitman played the role of army mascot Cigarette.

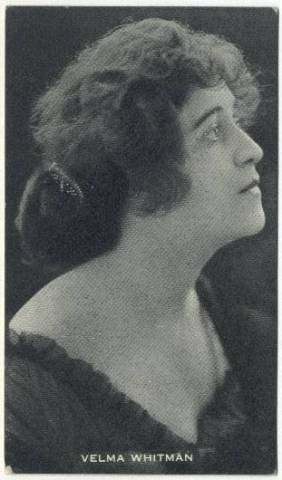
Velma Whitman Trading Card, c. 1916

=== Whitman's Comedians ===
In late 1906, Whitman formed her own vaudeville company under the name Whitman's Comedians, featuring Jack Roseleigh as the leading man and herself as the leading woman. In addition to an entire theater troupe, the company featured 20 musicians so they could provide their own accompaniment during plays. Her company played shows across the American South in large cities, doing shows exclusively in Texas from the end of 1907 through the beginning of 1908. The Atchison Daily Globe noted that their August 1909 show in Atchison, Kansas, was one of the very few they ever did in a city with less than 50,000 people.

Whitman was well known for her extensive collection of English and French gowns from prominent designers that she used in her performances, with her gowns described in a 1909 edition of the Waxahachie Daily Light as "one of the largest and most elaborate wardrobes of any leading woman in the country". One of the frequent theatrical productions by the company was The Mysterious Model, where Whitman played the main female lead Niobe, and is a retelling in modern day based on the mythology of Pygmalion and Galatea. The Winfield Daily Courier described Whitman's depiction of Niobe giving the character "a purity and innocence that were charming in her modern surroundings".

=== Broadening acts ===
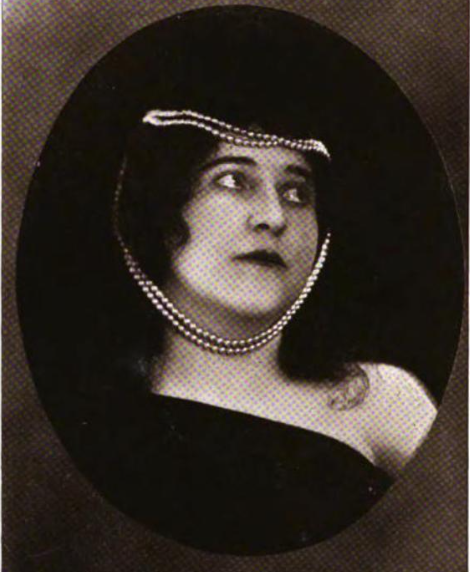
Velma Whitman, c. 1914

In 1911, Whitman started playing roles in other stock company shows for multiple theatrical seasons, frequently as the leading lady, such as the West End Heights Stock Company throughout 1911 and the North Brothers Stock Company throughout 1912. During an extended series of performances in Oklahoma in March 1912 with the latter company, The Daily Oklahoman noted of her role in A Little Brother of the Rich that Whitman "not only possesses beauty of face and figure, but has a graciousness about her that simple charms, and she is an actress, too, in the truest sense of the word". Whitman and her husband would leave the North Brothers Stock Company in August 1912, though still remaining at their home in Oklahoma City. Roseleigh would later form his own company at the end of 1912 named Own Stock, where Whitman would join him as the ongoing leading role opposite him.

During January 1913, Whitman starred in shows held by the Frank North Stock Company in Fort Worth, Texas, to temporarily replace their former lead, Ruth Robinson. For the rest of February and March 1913, she stayed with Mrs. Philip Mohan in Santa Barbara, California, and announced on March 20 that she was planning to move permanently to California to begin starring in films. She joined the Lubin Company run by Wilbert Melville in July of that year as one of two leading women for the company's films. Her first film role for the studio was in the 1913 film Playing With Fire.

== Personal life ==
Whitman was living in Long Beach, California at the time of the 1906 San Francisco earthquake and suffered loss of personal property. She had one brother, Fred Barger, who was also an actor and moved to California with her.

Whitman was married to Mike Levy, stage name Jack Roseleigh, after joining his company. She died at her home in Los, Angeles, California on July 18, 1937 at the age of 51 years. She was buried in Kansas City, Missouri, next to her mother.

== Theatre ==
- Dora Thorne (1905) as Dora Thorne
- Under Two Flags (1906) as Cigarette
- The Mysterious Model (1906) as Niobe
- Nature's Nobleman (1906) as Chick
- Reaping the Harvest (1906) as Lady Isabel
- The Peacemaker (1907) as Nellie Durkin
- Friends; A Comedy Drama in Four Acts (1908) as Marguerite Otto
- Divorçons (1908) as Madam Cyprienne De Prunelles
- Her Greatest Sin (1909) as Alice Rutherford
- The Sign of the Four (1909) as Mary Morton
- Thelma (1909) as Thelma Gouldmar
- Her Sister's Sin (1909) as Bessie Barton
- Van, the Virginian (1909)
- Woman Against Woman (1909) as Florence Grantly
- The Girl and the Sheriff (1909)
- Amy, the Circus Girl (1910) as Amy
- The House of a Thousand Candles (1911) as Marian Devereaux
- The Squaw Man (1911) as Nat-U-Rich
- Old Heidelberg (1911) as Kathie
- The Man on the Box (1911) as Bettie Annessley
- White Squadron (1911) as Onesta De Silveria
- Forgiven (1911) as Annie Dennison
- Going Some (1911) as Helen
- The World and the Leper (1911) as Lady Dolly Mult
- The Blue Mouse (1911) as The Blue Mouse
- The Servant In The House (1911) as the Vicar's wife
- A Little Brother of the Rich (1912) as Sylvia Castle
- A Corner In Coffee (1912) as Miss Livingstone
- The Vinegar Buyer (1912) as Mildred Arlington
- Bobby Burnit (1912) as Agnes Elliston
- Paid the Price (1912) as Madeline Waldron
- East Lynne (1912) as Lady Isabelle and Madam Vine
- His Last Dollar (1912) as Eleanor Downs
- Mam'selle (1912) as Mam'selle
- The New Magdalene (1912) as Mercy Merrick
- Lena Rivers (1912) as Lena Rivers
- Partners (1912) as Mary Brandon
- Alice of Old Vincennes (1912) as Alice
- In Love With Her Husband (1912) as Nellie Lee
- The Melting Pot (1912) as Vera Renendal
- The Golden Ranch Round Up (1912) as Margery
- The Blockhead and the Wise Guy (1912) as Kate Mayne
- Heart of New York (1912) as Ethel Douglas
- Checkers (1912) as Pert Barlow
- The Third Degree (1912) as Mrs. Howard Jeffries Jr.
- Strongheart (1912) as Dorothy
- The Road to Yesterday (1912)
- The Climbers (1912) as Blanche Sterling
- Clothes (1912)
- Mrs. Wiggs of the Cabbage Patch (1912) as Mrs. Wiggs
- Father and the Boys (1912) as Bessie Brayton
- Mary Jane's Pa (1912)
- The Regeneration (1912)
- The Aviator (1912)
- The Barrier (1912) as Necia
- Mr. Raffles (1913) as Gwendoline

== Filmography ==
- Playing With Fire (1913)
- The Medal of Honor (1913)
- A Mexican Tragedy (1913)
- For Her Brother's Sake (1913)
- To Love and Cherish (1913)
- The Mate of the Schooner Sadie (1913)
- When He Sees (1913)
- When the Clock Stopped (1913)
- Turning the Tables (1914) as Salita
- The Squire's Mistake (1914)
- Her Boy (1914)
- Mirrors of Death (1914)
- In Mysterious Ways (1914)
- Out of the Depths (1914) as Vera Rogers
- The Tell-Tale Star (1914)
- Sealed Orders (1914)
- The Secret Marriage (1914) as Maud Maybury
- On The Brink (1914)
- The Death Warrant (1914) as Helen Baxter
- Melita's Sacrifice (1914)
- The Signal (1914)
- Life's Lottery (1914)
- A Girl of the Cafes (1914) as The Cafe Girl
- The Candidate for Mayor (1914)
- The Parent Strain (1914)
- The Get-Away (1914)
- The Doom of Duty (1914)
- The Debt (1914)
- A Traitor to His Country (1914)
- The Lure of the Car Wheels (1914)
- The Downward Path (1914)
- The Stolen Yacht (1914)
- When the Range Called (1915)
- Her Father's Picture (1915)
- The Twig is Bent (1915)
- An Ambassador from the Dead (1915)
- The Silent Man (1915)
- The Stool Pigeon (1915)
- When War Threatened (1915)
- The Secret Room (1915)
- The Wall Between (1915)
- Melting Millions (1917) as Vera Morton
- The Book Agent (1917) as Mollie's Mother
- The Primitive Call (1917) as Elsie Jennings
- Some Boy! (1917) as Dotty Donald
- The Finger of Justice (1918) as Louise Bradley
- The Railroader (1919) as Blanche Conover
