= The Buster =

1923 film

- Directed by: Colin Campbell
- Screenplay by: Jack Strumwasser
- Based on: The Buster by William Patterson White
- Starring: Dustin Farnum; Doris Pawn; Francis McDonald; Gilbert Holmes; Lucille Hutton
- Cinematography: David Abel
- Production company: Fox Film Corporation
- Distributed by: Fox Film Corporation
- Release date: February 18, 1923
- Running time: 50 minutes
- Country: United States
- Languages: Silent; English intertitles

The Buster is a 1923 American silent Western film directed by Colin Campbell and written by Jack Strumwasser. It is based on the 1920 novel The Buster by William Patterson White. The film stars Dustin Farnum, Doris Pawn, Francis McDonald, Gilbert Holmes and Lucille Hutton. The film was released on February 18, 1923, by Fox Film Corporation.

== Cast ==
- Dustin Farnum as Bill Coryell
- Doris Pawn as Charlotte Rowland
- Francis McDonald as Swing
- Gilbert Holmes as Light Laurie
- Lucille Hutton as Yvonne

== Preservation ==
With no holdings located in archives, The Buster is considered a lost film.
