= Augusta Amherst Austen =

British organist and composer (1827–1877)

Augusta Amherst Austen (2 August 1827 – 5 August 1877) was a British organist and composer, chiefly of hymn tunes. She studied at the Royal Academy of Music, and learned organ from Mrs G. F. Anderson, who was Queen Victoria's teacher. Austen was a church organist for most of her active career, from 1844 to 1848 at Ealing Church, and from 1848 to 1857 at Paddington Chapel. She composed various hymn tunes, of which one, "St. Agnes", was published in Charles Steggall's Church Psalmody (1849).

== Life ==
Austen was born in London on 2 August 1827, and studied at the Royal Academy of Music. She learned organ from Mrs G. F. Anderson (née Lucy Philpott), who was Queen Victoria's teacher. She was a church organist for most of her active career, from 1844 to 1848 at Ealing Church, and from 1848 to 1857 at Paddington Chapel. She composed various hymn tunes, of which one, "St. Agnes", was published in Charles Steggall's Church Psalmody (1849).

She married military tailor Thomas Anstey Guthrie shortly after leaving Paddington Chapel. One of her sons, also named Thomas Anstey Guthrie, became a well-known novelist. She died suddenly in Glasgow on 5 August 1877.
