= Charlotte Merriam =

American actress

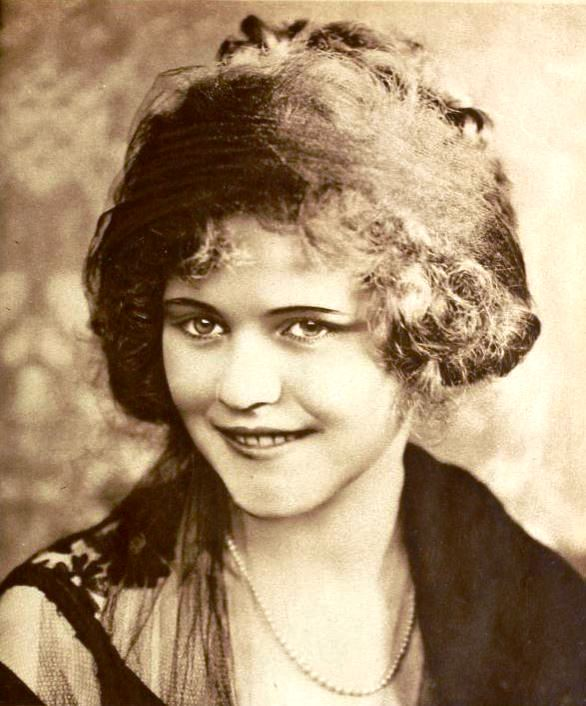
- Merriam in 1920
- Born: April 5, 1903; Sheridan, Illinois, U.S.
- Died: July 10, 1972 (aged 69); Los Angeles, California, U.S.
- Years active: 1919–1934
- Spouses: Rex Lease (m. 1925; div. 1929) Don Douglas (died 1946): Russell Kennedy Woodward
- Children: 2

Charlotte Merriam (April 5, 1903 – July 10, 1972) was an American motion picture actress.

== Career ==
Charlotte Merriam was the daughter of army colonel Henry Clay Merriam (1879-1955) and born in Fort Sheridan, Illinois. Her film career began in 1919 at the age of 16 with a role in The Flip of a Coin. While visiting Universal Pictures that year, she was offered a part in a comedy series starring Eddie Lyons and Leo Moran, possibly to replace their female regular, Betty Compson, who graduated to features. Merriam accepted. Afterward, she played leads in one- and two-reel comedies, and appeared in important parts in longer features. She performed with Colleen Moore in The Nth Commandment (1923) and was the female lead in The Brass Bottle (1923), directed by Maurice Tourneur.

She signed a long-term contract with Vitagraph Studios in June 1924. Her role of Mary Trail in Captain Blood (1924) was her transition from comedy to more serious films. Merriam was associated with Warner Brothers Pictures from 1929, when she signed to play the role of Camilla in Dumbbells in Ermine (1930). She was cast with Paul Hurst in an orphanage drama produced by the Tiffany Pictures about children of a deceased firefighter. The early sound film is titled The Third Alarm (1930). After the advent of sound, Merriam's roles consisted of portrayals of pre-Code tarnished society women, notably the drunken mother of two little girls who are in great danger in Night Nurse (1931) starring Barbara Stanwyck and Clark Gable, and as the syphilis-infected Elise in Damaged Lives (1934).

== Personal life and death ==
In December 1923, Merriam was named a co-respondent in a divorce suit brought by May Morris, the wife of film director Reggie Morris. Merriam married actor Rex Lease in 1925. The two met when he appeared in one of her films two years earlier. The actress filed for divorce in 1929. Merriam later married actor Don Douglas, who died in 1946. They had two children, Douglas Merriam Kinleyside (1937–1964) and Duncan William Kinleyside (1940–1994). Their residence was at 12423 Laurel Terrace, Studio City, California. Lastly, Merriam married Russell Kennedy Woodward (1910–1974).

Her childhood ambition was to become a concert pianist. She continued her musical education as a screen actress. She studied to be a vocalist with Felix Hughes. In January 1931, Merriam was operated on for an emergency appendicitis in San Francisco, California. She was in the Bay Area to participate in the entertainment for an automobile show.

Merriam died in Los Angeles on July 10, 1972, aged 69.

== Partial filmography ==
- The Blue Bonnet (1919)
- The Honey Bee (1920)
- The Brass Bottle (1923) as Sylvia Hamilton
- The Nth Commandment (1923) as Angie Sprunt
- Painted People (1924)
- The Breathless Moment (1924)
- Borrowed Husbands (1924)
- Code of the Wilderness (1924)
- Captain Blood (1924) as Mary Traill
- So Big (1924) as Julie Hempel
- Pampered Youth (1925)
- Steele of the Royal Mounted (1925)
- Oh Billy, Behave (1926)
- One Punch O'Day (1926)
- The Candy Kid (1928)
- The Broadway Hoofer (1929)
- Queen of the Night Clubs (1929) as Girl
- Pleasure Crazed (1929)
- Second Choice (1930) as Satterlee
- Dumbbells in Ermine (1930) as Camilla
- The Third Alarm (1930)
- Night Nurse (1931) as Mrs Ritchey
- Man Wanted (1932) as Miss Smith, Receptionist (uncredited)
- Damaged Lives (1933) as Elise Cooper
- Broken Dreams (1933)
- The Avenger (1933)
- Alimony Madness (1933)
- Dancing Man (1934)
