= The Beloved Cheater =

1919 film directed by Christy Cabanne

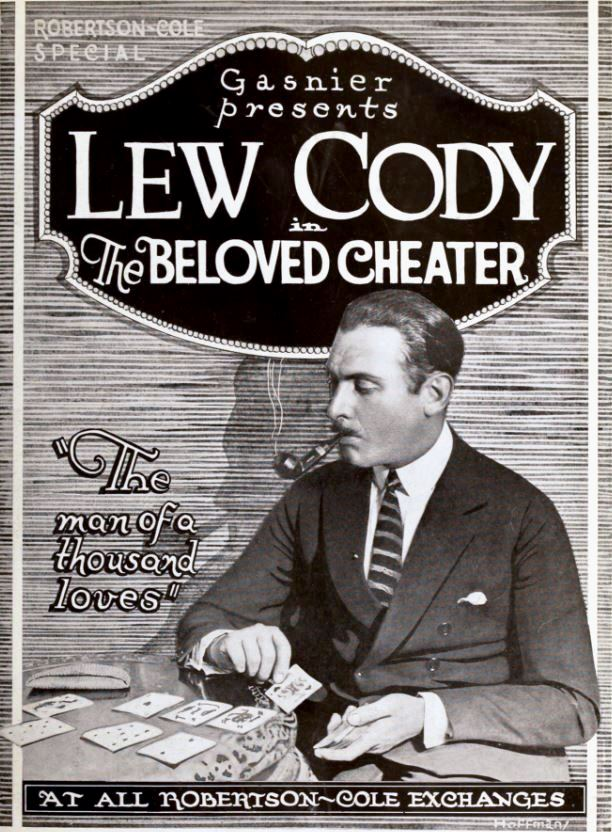
- Advertisement
- Directed by: Christy Cabanne
- Screenplay by: Lew Cody; Louis Gasnier
- Story by: Jules Furthman
- Produced by: Louis Gasnier
- Starring: Lew Cody; Doris Pawn; Eileen Percy
- Cinematography: Joseph A. Dubray
- Production companies: Astra Film Corp.; Lew Cody Films Corp.
- Distributed by: Robertson-Cole Distributing Corp.
- Release date: December 6, 1919 (US)
- Running time: 5 reels; 4921 feet
- Country: United States
- Language: Silent (English intertitles)

The Beloved Cheater (originally titled The Pleasant Devil) is a 1919 American silent comedy film, directed by Christy Cabanne. It stars Lew Cody, Doris Pawn, and Eileen Percy, and was released on December 6, 1919.

== Plot ==
Kingdon Challoner is in love with and engaged to Eulalie Morgan. The problem is that Eulalie is of the belief that kissing and petting are forbidden prior to marriage. Beside himself, Bruce enlists the help of Bruce Sands, a renowned playboy. The two concoct a plot whereby Sands will have the opportunity to seduce Eulalie, with her believing it is Kingdon. The plan is successful with the exception of Eulalie realizing it is not Kingdon who has seduced her. She breaks off her engagement with Kingdon and proclaims her love for Bruce.

However, when Eulalie goes to Bruce's place to let him know the good news, she finds a woman in his bed. Believing the woman to be Bruce's lover, she flees the scene. The woman is not a lover, but Bruce's sister, who is staying with him. When Kingdon arrives, he believes that Bruce has stolen Eulalie away from him. Bruce calms Kingdon down, getting him to understand that he has no design on Eulalie. He instructs Kingdon on how to properly seduce a woman. Kingdon pursues Eulalie, the two are reconciled and move forward with their plans for marriage.

== Cast ==
- Lew Cody as Bruce Sands
- Doris Pawn as Dorothy Sands
- Eileen Percy as Eulalie Morgan
- Jack Mower as Kingdon Challoner
- Alice Fleming as Mrs. Thorndyke-Brook
- Frederick Vroom as Mr. Challoner
- Andrew Robson as Mr. Morgan
- James Wang as himself
- Kathleen Kirkham

== Production ==
In July 1919, it was announced that Lew Cody's first film for Astra Film would be entitled The Beloved Cheater. The film was produced at Gasnier's studio in Glendale, California. In conjunction with the release of the film, the Robertson-Cole Exchange conducted a "love-letter" campaign, which offered $500 to the best love letter submitted. There were also monetary prizes for second, third, fourth and 5 fifth places. By the time of the picture's release, the studio had received over 3,500 entries from all over the United States.

The film was in post-production, with the finishing touches being put in place by September 20, 1919, and by mid-October the film was ready for release. It was shown for the first time at a preview in the Astor Hotel on October 6, 1919. Robertson-Cole purchased the rights to distribute The Beloved Cheater, along with five other upcoming Lew Cody films, in mid-October 1919. The film premiered in Atlantic City, New Jersey on December 29, 1919, at the Criterion Theatre. Fifteen hundred movie-goers braved a snowstorm standing in line for the film's opening.

== Reception ==
Pre-release critiques of the film called it "strikingly original". The Film Daily gave the film a positive review, calling it a "pleasing and very satisfying production". They complimented the performances the entire cast, and specifically highlighted those of Cody and Percy. They also found the title cards unobtrusive, the sets done with elegance and taste, and the overall production quality excellent. While they did take issue with a thin plot, they found the overall script contained "very interesting character studies in situations that at times are quite dramatic and always interesting.

== Notes ==
The film spawned a hit popular song, "That Beloved Cheater of Mine", which was distributed by Gilbert & Friedland.
