= Suspect (play) =

1937 play

- Original language: English
- Written by: Edward Percy; Reginald Denham
- Genre: Mystery thriller
- Setting: Cornwall, present day

Premiere
- Date: 16 February 1937
- Place: St Martin's Theatre, London

Suspect is a 1937 mystery thriller play by the British authors Edward Percy and Reginald Denham, written under the pen name Rex Judd. It ran at the St Martin's Theatre in London's West End for 84 performances between 16 February and 1 May 1937. The West End cast included Peter Murray-Hill, Campbell Gullan, David Horne, Mary Morris, Jean Cadell and Doris Lytton. It is a murder mystery set at a country house in Cornwall. It first appeared on Broadway at the Playhouse Theatre in 1940.

It was adapted several times for television. In 1939 it was adapted by the BBC for a television film of the same title and featuring a number of the original cast. Further BBC television films followed in 1946 and 1958. In addition a 1952 episode of the American show Broadway Television Theatre was based on the play.

== Bibliography ==
- Maxford, Howard. Hammer Complete: The Films, the Personnel, the Company. McFarland, 2018.
- Wearing, J. P. The London Stage 1930–1939: A Calendar of Productions, Performers, and Personnel. Rowman & Littlefield, 2014.
