= The Strange Boarder =

1920 film directed by Clarence G. Badger

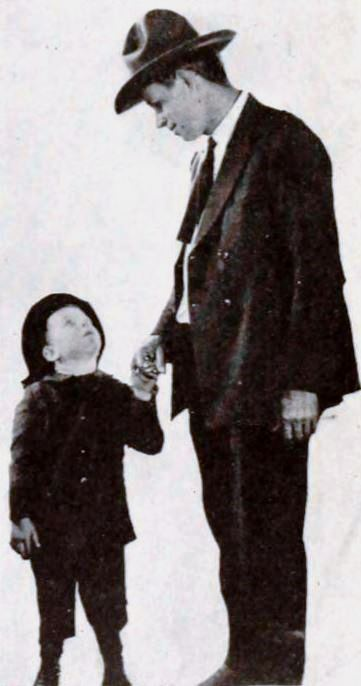
- Still with Will Rogers and his son Jimmy
- Directed by: Clarence G. Badger
- Screenplay by: Edfrid A. Bingham
- Story by: Will J. Payne
- Produced by: Samuel Goldwyn
- Starring: Will Rogers; Irene Rich; Jimmy Rogers; James Mason; Doris Pawn; Lionel Belmore
- Cinematography: Marcel Le Picard
- Production company: Goldwyn Pictures
- Distributed by: Goldwyn Pictures
- Release date: April 1920
- Running time: 50 minutes
- Country: United States
- Language: Silent (English intertitles)

The Strange Boarder is a lost 1920 American silent drama film directed by Clarence G. Badger and written by Edfrid A. Bingham. The film stars Will Rogers, Irene Rich, Jimmy Rogers, James Mason, Doris Pawn, and Lionel Belmore. The film was released in April 1920, by Goldwyn Pictures.

== Cast ==
- Will Rogers as Sam Gardner
- Irene Rich as Jane Ingraham
- Jimmy Rogers as Billy Gardner
- James Mason as Kittie Hinch
- Doris Pawn as Florry Hinch
- Lionel Belmore as Jake Bloom
- Jack Richardson as Westmark
- Sydney Deane as Dawson
- Louis Durham as Sergeant Worrill
