= Doris Pawn =

American actress (1894–1988)

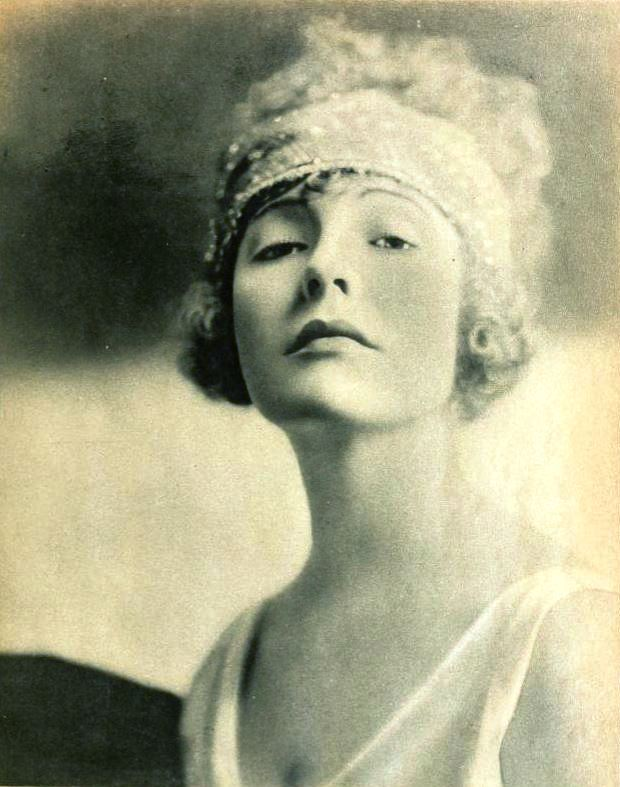
- Pawn in 1920
- Born: Doris Alice Pahn; December 29, 1894; Norfolk, Nebraska, U.S.
- Died: March 30, 1988 (aged 93); La Jolla, California, U.S.
- Occupation: Actress
- Years active: 1914–1923
- Spouses: Rex Ingram (m. 1917; div. 1920) Paul Reiners (m. 1928, divorced) Samuel William Dunaway (m. 1937; died 1969)

Doris Pawn (born Doris Alice Pahn; December 29, 1894 – March 30, 1988) was an American silent era film actress.

== Early life ==
Born and raised in Norfolk, Nebraska, Pawn spent her vacations on the ranch of an uncle. There, she learned to ride horseback. She entered a business college to prepare for life as a typist. She came to California with her mother and brother and stayed in San Diego, California while her family returned east.

Pawn eventually met director Wilfred Lucas. She was offered work as a fill in in the film Trey of Hearts (1914), while the company was on location in San Diego. So impressed were the filmmakers that she was offered additional work if she came along to Los Angeles, California. Pawn worked for a period of three months as an extra.

== Career ==
Director Sydney Ayres coveted Pawn as a leading lady early in her screen career. In 1916, she appeared in her first Fox Film feature, Blue Blood and Red, directed by Raoul Walsh. Studios were impressed with her personal charm and ability to act naturally. She was especially gifted in the art of pantomime.

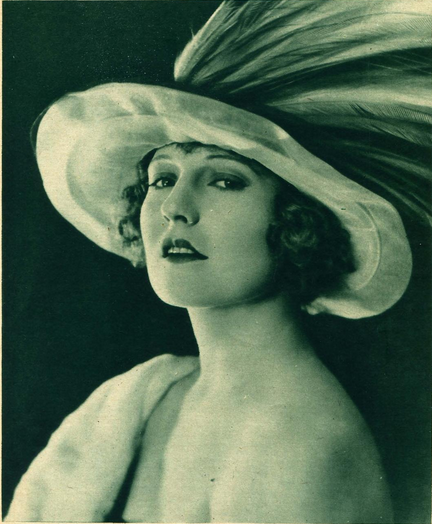
Doris Pawn in 1923

In addition to Fox, Pawn made movies with Universal, Goldwyn, and Paramount Pictures. She returned to Fox in 1921 for the making of Shame. She starred alongside John Gilbert and Anna May Wong. Her final films were two dramas, Fools and Riches and The Hero, along with a western, The Buster. Each of these productions was released in 1923.

== Selected filmography ==
- The Trey o' Hearts (1914)
- Blue Blood and Red (1916)
- Little Eve Edgarton (1916)
- The Book Agent (1917)
- Some Boy! (1917)
- The City of Dim Faces (1918)
- Toby's Bow (1919)
- The Beloved Cheater (1919)
- The Penalty (1920)
- Li Ting Lang (1920)
- The Strange Boarder (1920)
- Out of the Storm (1920)
- What Happened to Rosa (1920)
- Shame (1921)
- A Midnight Bell (1921)
- Guile of Women (1921)
- Fightin' Mad (1921)
- The Millionaire (1921)
- Cheated Hearts (1921)
- Always the Woman (1922)
- Strange Idols (1922)
- One Clear Call (1922)
- Fools and Riches (1923)
- The Buster (1923)
- The Hero (1923)
