= Alf's Button (1930 film) =

1930 British film by W. P. Kellino

- Theatrical release poster
- Directed by: W. P. Kellino
- Written by: L'Estrange Fawcett
- Based on: Alf's Button by William Darlington
- Produced by: L'Estrange Fawcett
- Starring: Tubby Edlin; Alf Goddard; Nora Swinburne; Polly Ward
- Cinematography: William Shenton; Percy Strong
- Music by: Louis Levy
- Production company: Gaumont British Picture Corporation
- Distributed by: Gaumont British Distributors
- Release date: 24 March 1930
- Running time: 96 minutes
- Country: United Kingdom
- Language: English

Alf's Button is a 1930 British comedy film directed by W. P. Kellino and starring Tubby Edlin, Alf Goddard and Nora Swinburne. It was written by L'Estrange Fawcett based on the 1920 novel Alf's Button by William Aubrey Darlington, which had previously been filmed in 1920.

The film features some singing and dancing sequences in an early colour process, which is believed to be Pathécolor.

== Premise ==
A Cockney soldier discovers that a button on his uniform was made from Aladdin's lamp. When rubbed, the button grants wishes.

== Cast ==
- Tubby Edlin as Alf Higgins
- Alf Goddard as Bill Grant
- Nora Swinburne as Lady Isobel Fitzpeter
- Polly Ward as Liz
- Humberston Wright as Eustace the genie
- Annie Esmond as Mrs. Gaskins
- Gypsy Rhoumaje as Lucy (as Gypsy Rhouma)
- Peter Haddon as Lieutenant Allen
- Cyril McLaglen as Sergeant Major
- Bruce Winston as Mustapha
- Spencer Trevor as Lord Dunwater
- Anton Dolin
- Merle Oberon
- Jimmy Nervo
- Teddy Knox

== Reception ==
Kine Weekly wrote: "The introduction of dialogue certainly brings fresh interest to this popular extravaganza, which, with its broad Cockney humour, dispensed by Tubby Edlin and Alf Goddard, is sufficiently universal in 1ts appeal to make the picture a safe attraction for the majority of houses. ... Tubby Edlin and Alf Goddard are very well cast as Alf and Bill respectively, and succeed in extracting every ounce of humour from their parts. ... W. P. Kellino has presented a rather too literal version of the stage play, and has not fully availed himself of the possibilities presented by the camera, but he has successfully transferred to the film the essential broad Cocknéy humour which is the basis of the play. The production generally is not smooth and lacks polish, but the lavish ballet scenes are presented in colour, and give a popular spectacular touch to the proceedings."

Picturegoer wrote: "When this was presented two years ago I considered that it relied chiefly on broad Cockney humour, and Tubby Edlin and Alf Goddard for its appeal. The technical qualities were rather neglected, as were camera possibilities. With the further advance in technical polish these facts will probably be accentuated. However, it will be worth seeing for the irresponsible fooling of the two leading comedians, as well as for the extremely funny knockabout ballet scene, which is graced by Nervp and Knox; these cannot date."

== See also ==
- Alf's Button (1920)
- List of early color feature films
