= Vice Versa (novel) =

1882 novel by Thomas Anstey Guthrie

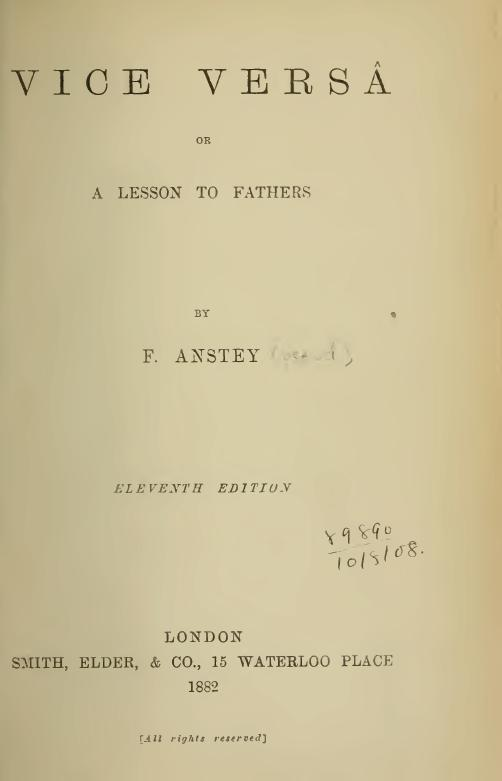
- Title page of an 1882 edition
- Author: F. Anstey
- Language: English
- Genre: Fantasy novel
- Publisher: D. Appleton & Company
- Publication date: 1882
- Publication place: United Kingdom
- Media type: Print (hardback)
- Pages: 349 pp

Vice Versa: A Lesson to Fathers is a comic novel by Thomas Anstey Guthrie, writing under the pseudonym "F. Anstey", first published in 1882. The title originates from the Latin phrase "vice versa", meaning "the other way around".

In Victorian London, a father and son switch places by means of a magic stone from India, thus live each other's lives, and gain a better understanding for each other before they switch back.

== Plot summary ==
Set in contemporary Victorian times, the novel concerns stuffy businessman Paul Bultitude and his son Dick. Dick is about to leave home to return to a boarding school run by the cane-wielding headmaster, Dr. Grimstone. Mr. Bultitude, seeing Dick's fear of returning to school, dismisses his son's concerns by asserting that schooldays are the best years of a boy's life, and how he wishes he were the one going.

At this point, thanks to a magic stone brought by Dick's uncle from India which grants the possessor one wish, the father and son find themselves magically transformed into identical versions of the other. Dick, holding the stone, is ordered by his father to return him to his own body, but Dick refuses. Paul has to begin the new term at his son's boarding school, while Dick gets a chance to run his father's business in the City. In the end, both are restored to their own bodies, with a better understanding of each other.

== Adaptations ==
=== Theatre ===
In 1883, playwright Edward Rose adapted the story as a West End play, also titled Vice Versa.

=== Radio ===
The BBC made a six-part radio series in 1947, adapted and produced by Felix Felton. Paul Bultitude was played by Ronald Simpson, and his mischievous son Dick by John Clark. Dr. Grimstone was played by veteran radio actor Ralph Truman. An early example of creative sound effects before the days of tape meant that when the father succeeds in his wish to be just like his son going off to school, juvenile actor John Clark had to talk to himself. He had to pre-record the father's dialogue on the 15 inch disks used at that time, and leave gaps for the son's character to speak. After much careful rehearsal, the broadcast went out live, with naturalistic speech overlaps.

=== Film and television ===
The story has also been adapted for film at least four times, and for television at least once. The first film adaptation was a British silent film released in 1916: it was directed by Maurice Elvey, and starred Charles Rock, Douglas Munro and Guy Newall. The second, also British, was released in 1937.

The third film, again British, was released in 1948. It was written and directed by Peter Ustinov, and starred Roger Livesey as Paul Bultitude and Anthony Newley (fresh from the Italia Conti Academy) as Dick. John Clark, who had played Dick in the radio adaptation, was initially auditioned and cast by Ustinov, with a seven-year Rank contract. However, his agent had overlooked a clause in his Just William theatre contract, which gave an option for the tour to be repeated across England for another year. Newley was therefore cast in his place.

The 1981 ITV television adaptation featured Peter Bowles as Paul Bultitude.

The 1988 American film version, adapted into a modern setting, stars Judge Reinhold and Fred Savage as the father and son. It did not credit F. Anstey's novel as its source in its initial release, but retained the title.

== Allusions/references from other works ==
The novels Freaky Friday and Summer Switch by Mary Rodgers are modern re-tellings of the same story.

Mr. Bultitude (but not the name of the novel) is mentioned in The Gold Bat by P. G. Wodehouse, in the first paragraph of Chapter XII. The book had previously been referred to as one of those vandalised in Chapter VII.

Mr. Bultitude is also the name of the tame bear (the last of the Seven Bears of Logres) in the third book of C. S. Lewis' science fiction trilogy, That Hideous Strength.

Vice Versa is also mentioned in Episode 15, "Circe", of James Joyce's Ulysses (1922); in Chapter 6 of Malcolm Lowry's Under the Volcano (1947); in Evelyn Waugh's Officers and Gentlemen (1955) (the second in his Sword of Honour trilogy) as the novel Guy was reading in the summer-garden; in Surprised by Joy by C. S. Lewis (1955); in Chapter V of A Prisoner in Fairyland by Algernon Blackwood (1913); in Chapter 3, section 3 of Evil Under the Sun by Agatha Christie (1941); and in In Search of Treasure by Horatio Alger (1907).

== See also ==
- Body swap appearances in media
