= What Happened to Rosa =

1920 film by Victor Schertzinger

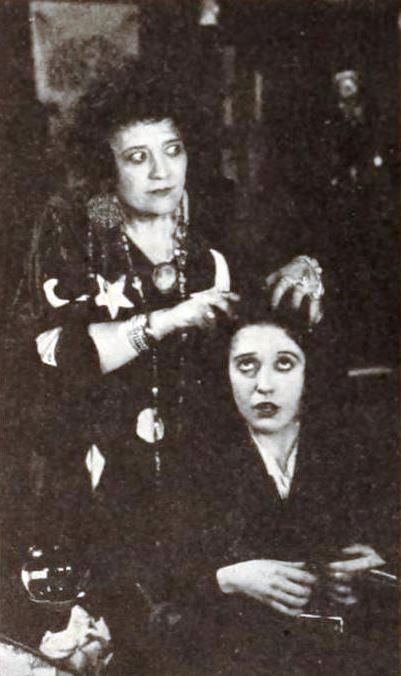
- Directed by: Victor Schertzinger
- Produced by: Samuel Goldwyn
- Starring: Mabel Normand
- Cinematography: George Webber
- Distributed by: Goldwyn Pictures
- Release date: December 1920
- Running time: 54 minutes
- Country: United States
- Language: Silent with English intertitles

What Happened to Rosa is a 1920 American silent comedy film directed by Victor Schertzinger and featuring Mabel Normand and Doris Pawn.

== Plot ==
A fortune teller tells a store clerk with a romantic disposition that she was a Spanish noblewoman in an earlier life. The girl begins to live the part of the Spanish noblewoman and romance and comedy ensue.

== Cast ==
- Mabel Normand as Mayme Ladd/Rosa Alvaro
- Doris Pawn as Gwen Applebaum
- Tully Marshall as Percy Peacock
- Hugh Thompson as Dr. Maynard Drew
- Eugenie Besserer as Madame Yvette O'Donnell
- Buster Trow as Jim
- Adolphe Menjou as Reporter Friend of Dr. Drew (uncredited)

== See also ==
- List of American films of 1920
