= Lucille Hutton =

American actress (1898–1979)

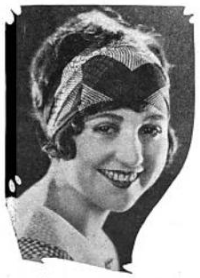
- Born: 1898; Los Angeles, California, U.S.
- Died: 1979 (aged 80–81)
- Occupation: Actress
- Years active: 1916–1931
- Spouse(s): Donald Carlos Jacobson (1929–1930, divorced); George G. Buckingham (1930–?)

Lucille Hutton (1898–1979) was an American film actress of the silent era. She appeared in 56 films between 1916 and 1931.

== Biography ==
Hutton was born in Los Angeles, California, and attended Sacred Heart Academy there. Before working in films, she performed on stage in Los Angeles with the Morosco Stock Company and in vaudeville on the Keith and Orpheum circuits.

Hutton's first feature film was The Miracle Man (1919). She appeared opposite Bobby Vernon in a series of comedy films.

Hutton married Donald Carlos Jacobson in March 1929 in Honolulu. They were divorced on August 26, 1930, and on August 27, 1930, she married George G. Buckingham. She filed for divorce from Buckingham on February 21, 1931.

== Selected filmography ==
- The Miracle Man (1919)
- The Last Outlaw (1919)
- Ladies Must Live (1921)
- The Village Blacksmith (1922)
- East Side - West Side (1923)
- The Buster (1923)
- Desire (1923)
- The Breathless Moment (1924)
- Wine of Youth (1924)
- The Sunset Trail (1924)
- Dick Turpin (1925)
- Fire Away (1925)
- The Winner (1926)
- Listen Lena (1927)
