= Tourmalin's Time Cheques =

1891 novel by F. Anstey

Tourmalin's Time Cheques is a novel by F. Anstey published in 1891.

== Plot summary ==
Tourmalin's Time Cheques is a novel in which Tourmalin deposits his long uninteresting seagoing hours in a Time Bank, and he can reclaim these hours later to use however he needs.

== Reception ==
Dave Langford reviewed Tourmalin's Time Cheques for White Dwarf #87, and stated that "Antsey can only resolve things by a hoary literary device [...] Otherwise, it's still fun."

== Reviews ==
- Review by Agatha Taormina (1987) in Fantasy Review, April 1987
- Review by Don D'Ammassa (1987) in Science Fiction Chronicle, #92 May 1987
- Review by Tom A. Jones (1987) in Vector 138
