= Vice Versa (play) =

Play by Edward Rose

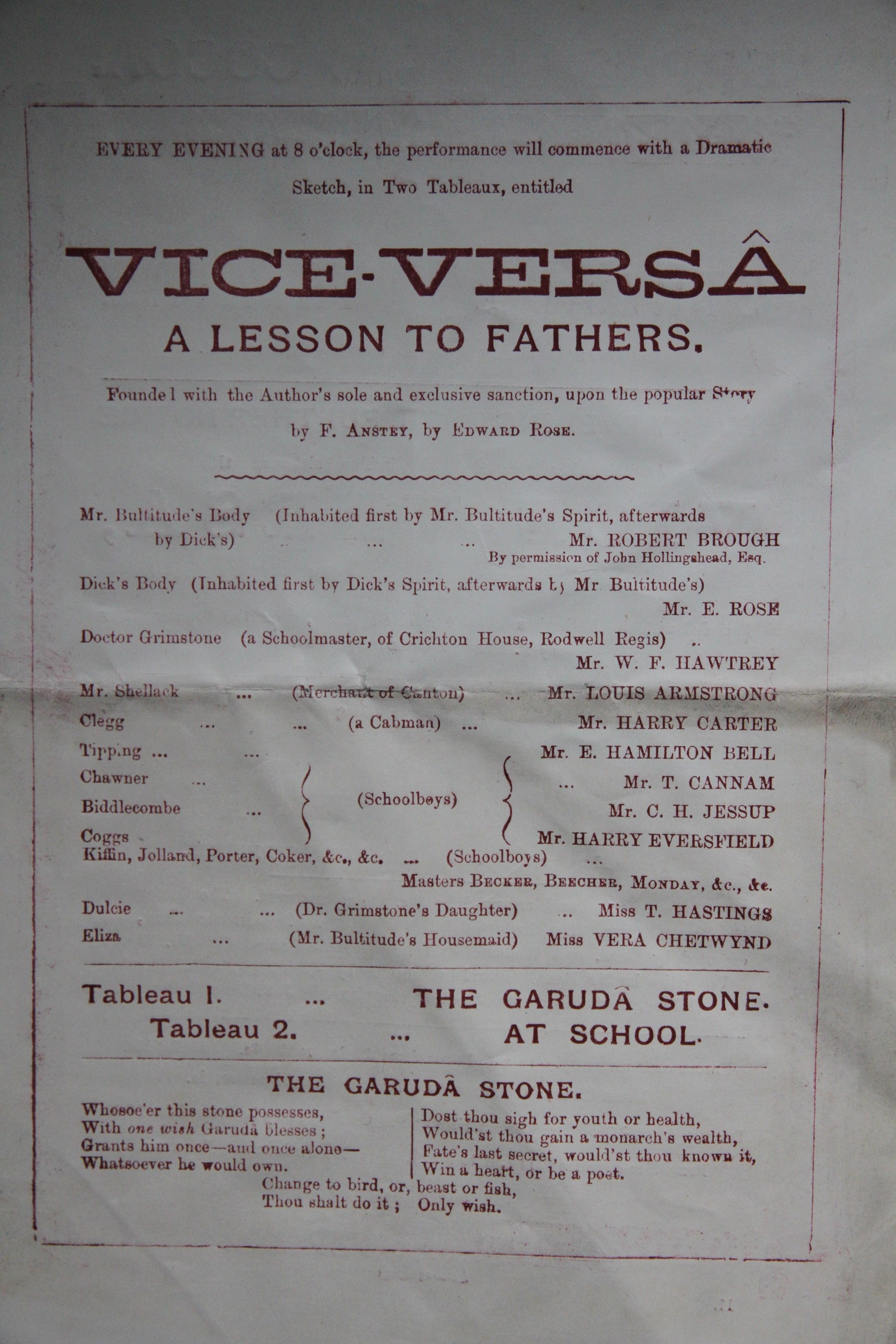
- Cast list for a Strand Theatre production
- Original language: English
- Written by: Edward Rose
- Based on: Vice Versa by Thomas Anstey Guthrie
- Genre: Fantasy

Premiere
- Date: 9 April 1883
- Place: Gaiety Theatre, London

Vice Versa: A Lesson to Fathers is a play by Edward Rose that adapted the 1882 novel of the same name by Thomas Anstey Guthrie. The play debuted at the Gaiety Theatre, London on 9 April 1883. The story is about a body swap between a father and son. Rose played the son in the debut production; Charles Hawtrey played the father.

Guthrie authorized Rose's adaptation, but later decided to write his own stage version of the story, which debuted in 1910.

== Plot ==
Mr. Bultitude, a middle-aged man with a school-aged son named Dick, has unknowingly come into possession of the "Garuda stone", a magical object that grants its holder one wish. When Dick complains about school, Bultitude expresses a wish that he could be young again and take his son's place. The stone fulfills the wish by causing the two to swap bodies. Although Bultitude wants to swap back, Dick is pleased to be an adult and wishes for his body-swapped father to be sent off to boarding school. Bultitude's middle-aged habits are out of place at school, and he is surprised by romantic attention from Dulcie Grimstone, the schoolmaster's daughter. When Dulcie learns about the swap, she obtains the stone and wishes for them to be swapped back.

== Cast and characters ==
The characters and cast from the Gaiety Theatre production are given below:

Cast of the Gaiety production
Character	Cast
Mr. Bultitude's body	C. H. Hawtrey
Dick's body	Edward Rose
Dr. Grimestone (a schoolmaster)	W. F. Hawtrey
Mr. Shellack (a merchant)	Louis Armstrong
Clegg (a cabman)	Frank Wood
Tipping (a schoolboy)	E. Hamilton Bell
Chawner (a schoolboy)	T. Cannam
Dulcie (Grimstone's daughter)	Laura Linden
Eliza (a housemaid)	Rose Roberts

== Reception ==
Punch described the production at the Gaiety as "thoroughly successful, very funny, and well played all around", with the exception of some overacting by Rose. When the play moved to the Royal Strand Theatre, The Academy said the story was better handled as a play than it was as a novel and said it was well handled, especially in the second act. The Athenaeum said the story was difficult to adapt for the stage, and the result was "diverting" but sometimes hard to follow. The Theatre said the play was "cleverly done", but "did not wholly succeed". In his reviews of the plays of 1883, drama critic Austin Brereton said the adaptation was "rather cleverly done", but the story was "unsatisfactory as a play".

The Oxford Magazine praised an 1886 production in that city, especially the acting of Agnes Verity in the role of Dulcie.
