= The Brass Bottle (1923 film) =

1923 film by Maurice Tourneur

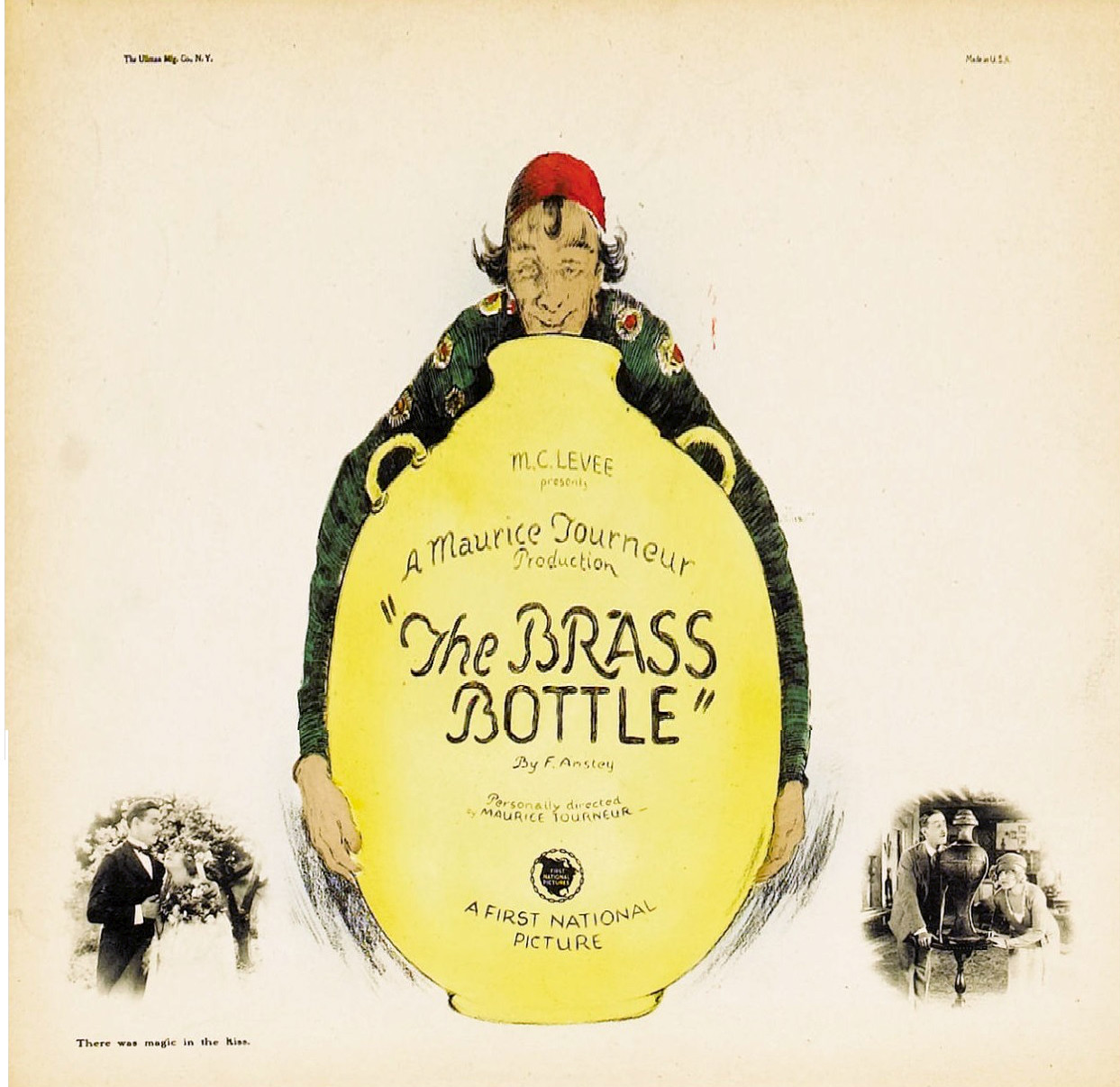
- Lobby card
- Directed by: Maurice Tourneur
- Written by: Fred Myton (scenario)
- Based on: The Brass Bottle by Thomas Anstey Guthrie
- Produced by: Maurice Tourneur
- Cinematography: Arthur L. Todd
- Distributed by: First National Pictures (as Associated First National)
- Release date: July 22, 1923
- Running time: 6 reels
- Country: United States
- Language: Silent (English intertitles)

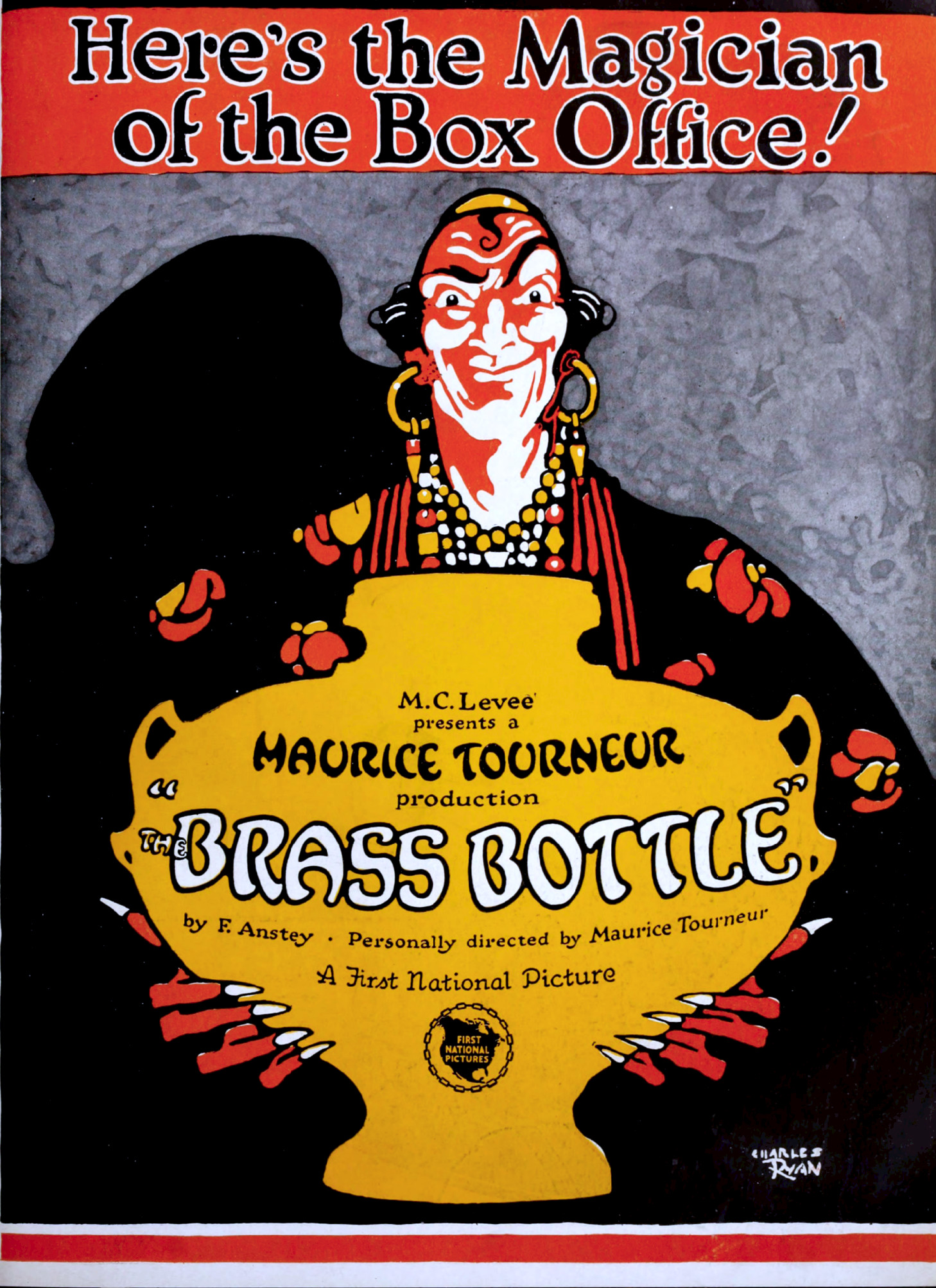
Contemporary advertisement.

The Brass Bottle is a 1923 American silent fantasy comedy film produced and directed by Maurice Tourneur and distributed by First National Pictures. The original 1900 novel The Brass Bottle by Thomas Anstey Guthrie was produced as a Broadway play in 1910. A 1914 silent followed. Both silent versions are lost. A 1964 adaptation starred Tony Randall and Barbara Eden.

== Cast ==
- Harry Myers as Horace Ventimore
- Ernest Torrence as Fakresh-el-Aamash
- Tully Marshall as Professor Hamilton
- Clarissa Selwynne as Mrs. Hamilton
- Ford Sterling as Rapkin
- Aggie Herring as Mrs. Rapkin
- Charlotte Merriam as Sylvia Hamilton
- Edward Jobson as Samuel Wackerbath
- Barbara La Marr as The Queen
- Otis Harlan as Captain of the Guard
- Hazel Keener
- Julanne Johnston
- Roy Coulson as One-eyed evil spirit (uncredited)

== Preservation ==
With no prints of The Brass Bottle located in any film archives, it is considered a lost film.
