= Broadway Television Theatre =

- Country of origin: United States
- Original language: English
- No. of seasons: 3
- No. of episodes: 73

Production
- Camera setup: Single-camera
- Running time: 60 minutes
- Production company: WOR-TV

Original release
- Release: 14 April 1952 – 18 January 1954

Broadway Television Theatre is a one-hour syndicated television anthology series produced by WOR-TV in New York City. The series premiered April 14, 1952 and ran through January 25, 1954.

== Overview ==
Broadway Television Theatre featured a new adaptation of a famous play each week "with a brand-new performance every night of the week". Christopher Plummer, who starred in two episodes, described the performances as "like doing summer stock with cameras".

== Production ==
The shows were performed live on WOR, and kinescope recordings were made for potential syndication to stations in other markets, with limited success.

Warren Wade created the program and was its producer. Ray Boyle directed the show.

== Episodes ==
Ann Dvorak starred in the title role in the premiere episode, The Trial of Mary Dugan.

The list of shows adapted include:

- Angel Street, written by Patrick Hamilton (writer)
- Craig's Wife, written by George Kelly (playwright)
- Dark Victory
- The Front Page, written by Ben Hecht and Charles MacArthur
- Gramercy Ghost, written by John Cecil Holm
- The Hasty Heart, written by John Patrick (dramatist)
- Janie
- Kind Lady, written by Edward Chodorov
- The Last of Mrs. Cheyney, written by Frederick Lonsdale
- The Letter, written by W. Somerset Maugham
- Night Must Fall, written by Emlyn Williams
- Night of January 16th, written by Ayn Rand
- Reflected Glory, written by George Kelly (playwright)
- R.U.R., written by Karel Čapek
- Room Service
- Suspect by Reginald Denham
- The Bat by Mary Roberts Rinehart and Avery Hopwood
- The Jazz Singer, written by Samson Raphaelson
- The Thirteenth Chair, written by Bayard Veiller
- Three Men on a Horse, written by George Abbott
- The Trial of Mary Dugan, written by Bayard Veiller
- Twentieth Century, written by Ben Hecht and Charles MacArthur
- Your Uncle Dudley, written by Howard Lindsay and Bertrand Robinson

== See also ==
- 1952–53 United States network television schedule
- 1953–54 United States network television schedule
