= The Breathless Moment =

1924 film directed by Robert F. Hill

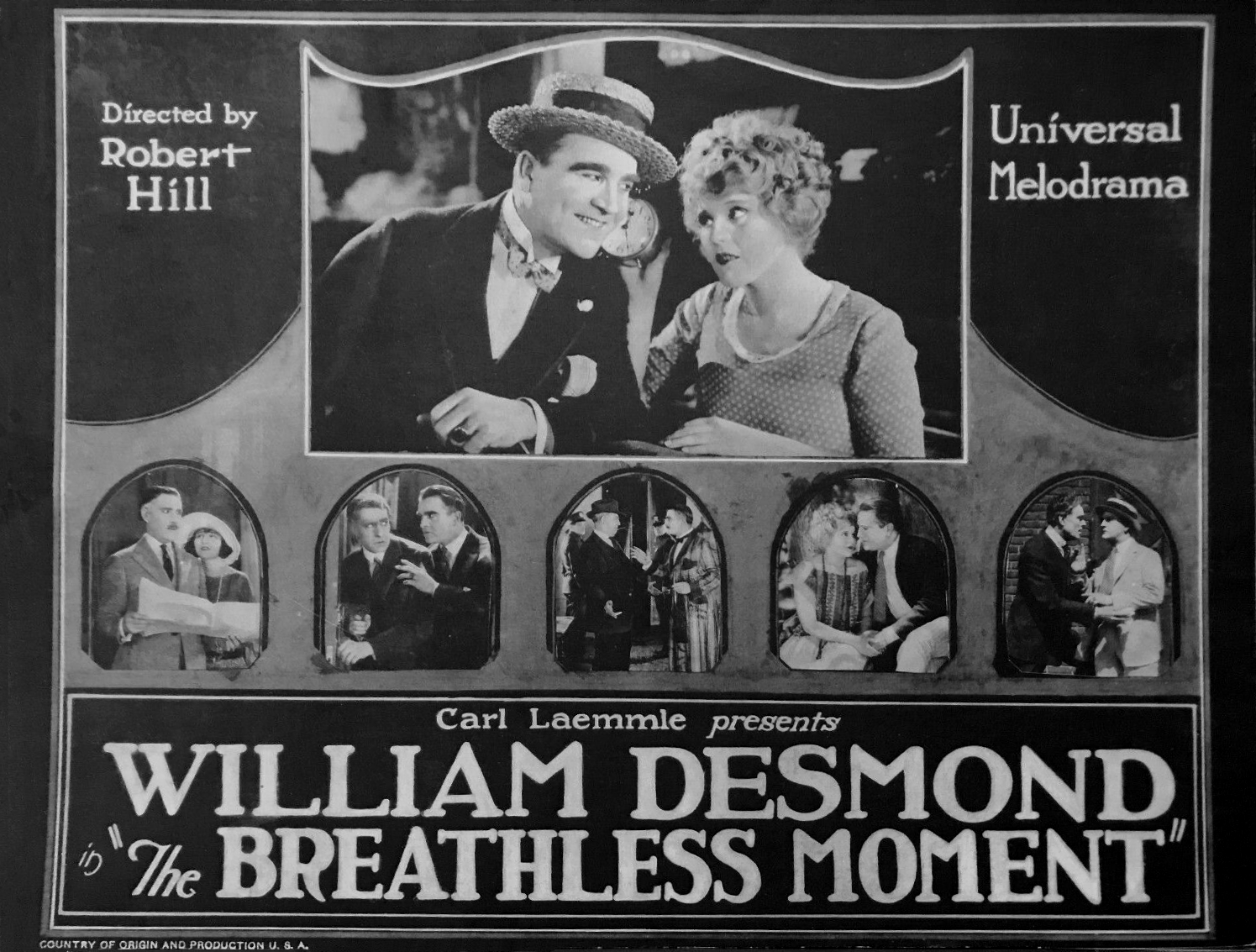
- Lobby card
- Directed by: Robert F. Hill
- Written by: Harvey Gates; Raymond L. Schrock; William E. Wing
- Based on: Richard by Marguerite Bryant
- Produced by: Carl Laemmle
- Starring: William Desmond; Charlotte Merriam; Alfred Fisher
- Cinematography: William Thornley
- Production company: Universal Pictures
- Distributed by: Universal Pictures
- Release date: February 3, 1924
- Running time: 1 hour
- Country: United States
- Language: Silent (English intertitles)

The Breathless Moment is a 1924 American silent comedy drama film directed by Robert F. Hill and starring William Desmond, Charlotte Merriam, and Alfred Fisher.

== Plot ==
As described in a film magazine review, Billy Carson and Dan Cassidy, pals and crooks, are contrasting types, with Carson a cheerful individual who loves a joke and turns a sunny gaze upon the world, while his partner Cassidy a pronounced pessimist with an ingrowing grouch against everyone and everything with the exception of his pal. They visit the home of a millionaire while he is in Europe and, when Detective Quinn arrives at the mansion, Carson poses as the millionaire as he removes a number of priceless paintings. Quinn is put on their trail. After a variety of complications, by chance it happens that Carson saves the wife of Quinn and is slightly injured in the process. Quinn, feeling an obligation towards the criminal, offers Carson the alternatives of settling down and living quietly in a small village or going to jail. Carson and his pal go to a village, and the former falls in love when he discovers the fascinations of a young woman of the village, going straight and finding happiness.

== Cast ==
- William Desmond as Billy Carson
- Charlotte Merriam as June Smart
- Alfred Fisher as David Smart
- Robert Homans as Detective Quinn
- Lucille Hutton as Mildred Day
- John Steppling as Banker Day
- Margaret Cullington as Evangeline Clementine Jones
- Harry von Meter as Tricks Kennedy
- Al Hart as Dan Cassidy

== Bibliography ==
- Darby, William. Masters of Lens and Light: A Checklist of Major Cinematographers and Their Feature Films. Scarecrow Press, 1991. ISBN 0-8108-2454-X
