= Some Boy! =

1917 film

- Directed by: Otis Turner
- Written by: William Parker
- Produced by: William Fox
- Starring: George Walsh; Doris Pawn; Herschel Mayall
- Cinematography: R. E. Irish
- Production company: Fox Film
- Distributed by: Fox Film
- Release date: June 17, 1917
- Running time: 50 minutes
- Country: United States
- Languages: Silent; English intertitles

Some Boy! is a 1917 American silent comedy-drama film directed by Otis Turner, and starring George Walsh, Doris Pawn, and Herschel Mayall.

A review of the film in the trade publication Exhibitors Herald said, "The story is too slight to hold interest, and the action is slow, with Mr. Walsh ever in the limelight."

== Cast ==
- George Walsh as Joyous Johnson
- Doris Pawn as Marjorie Milbank
- Herschel Mayall as William Johnson
- Caroline Rankin as Arminta Simpkins
- Hector V. Sarno as Count I. Boccacio
- Velma Whitman as Dotty Donald
- Norbert A. Myles as Ned Milbank

== Censorship ==
Before Some Boy! could be exhibited in Kansas, the Kansas Board of Review required the elimination of several scenes, one where a man is dressed as a woman, all smoking, and "exposure of limbs."

== Bibliography ==
- Solomon, Aubrey. The Fox Film Corporation, 1915-1935: A History and Filmography. McFarland, 2011.
