= Listen Lena =

1927 film

- Directed by: Clem Beauchamp; Stephen Roberts
- Produced by: Jack White
- Starring: Al St. John; Lucille Hutton
- Cinematography: Dwight Warren
- Distributed by: Educational Pictures
- Release date: February 13, 1927
- Running time: 2 reels
- Country: United States
- Languages: Silent; English intertitles

Listen Lena is a 1927 American comedy film directed by Clem Beauchamp. According to the Internet Movie Database, Fatty Arbuckle appears in this film as a "fat man with strategically covered face", although the role is uncredited and unconfirmed.

== Cast ==
- Al St. John as Al Adams
- Lucille Hutton as Lena
- Jack Lloyd as Lena's father
- Clem Beauchamp as Cyril
- Glen Cavender
- Al Thompson
- Roscoe "Fatty" Arbuckle as Fat man with strategically covered face (uncredited) (unconfirmed)

== See also ==
- Fatty Arbuckle filmography
