= Basil Hallam =

English actor and singer (1888–1916)

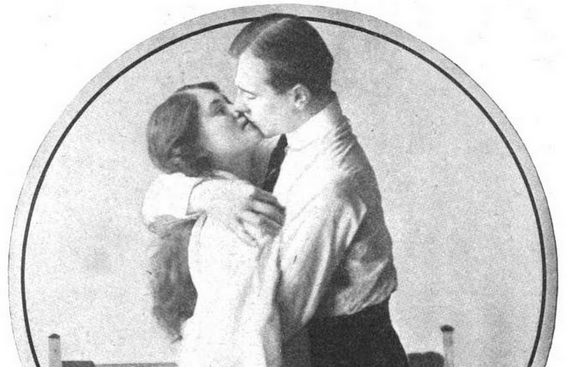
Doris Lytton as Effie and Hallam as Archie in Cosmo Hamilton's The Blindness of Virtue (1913).

Basil Hallam Radford (3 April 1888 – 20 August 1916) was an English actor and singer, known for the character of Gilbert the Filbert in The Passing Show. He died in action on the Western Front during World War I.

== Early life ==
Basil Hallam was born on 3 April 1888 at 55 Marine Parade, Brighton, East Sussex, England, the youngest son and child of Walter Thomas Hindmarsh Radford, a ship and insurance broker (1845–1927), and Ann Louisa Maria Radford (née Wulff) (1847–1924). He was the youngest of six siblings: Annie Marguerite (1874–1943), Walter Guy (1875–1947), Ethel May (1880–?), Archibald Campbell (1881–1958) and Maurice Clive (1884–1915). Hallam was baptised on 23 May 1888 in St Mary's, Hendon, Middlesex. He was educated at the Meads preparatory school in Eastbourne, Charterhouse School and the University of Oxford.

== Theatrical career ==
He began his career in Shakespearean roles with Sir Herbert Beerbohm Tree's company in 1908. He had an early success as Archie Graham in Cosmo Hamilton's The Blindness of Virtue, opposite Doris Lytton as Effie. He appeared in New York City with Billie Burke in Mrs. Dot. On 2 April 1911, he was resident at 25 Park Crescent, St Marylebone, London, England.

He created the character of a privileged young "knut", Gilbert the Filbert, for The Passing Show (1914), the original revue of that title by Herman Finck, which opened at the Palace Theatre, London, on 20 April 1914. He also recorded the song of the same name for the His Master's Voice label on 4 June 1914. (The song can be heard on a 2012 release by the Diversions record label, The Finck Album, sung by Mart Sander.)

== Personal life ==
Before entering service for World War I, Hallam fell in love with Elsie Janis, with whom he had starred in The Passing Show of 1915. They set up home in the city of Liverpool.

== Death ==
Granville Bradshaw bitterly claimed that his friend Basil Hallam, who was famous for his song "Gilbert the Filbert the Colonel of the Knuts", was de facto killed by White Feather Campaign women. According to Bradshaw, the two men were walking down Shaftesbury Avenue after Hallam's show when "we were both surrounded by young, stupid, and screaming girls who stuck white feathers into the lapels of our coats. When we extricated our selves Basil said, 'I shall go and join-up immediately'—he did. I heard a few weeks later that my friend Basil Hallam had joined the para troops (balloon observer) and in his first descent with a parachute it failed to open. He was killed and he died during the afternoon."

Hallam died on 20 August 1916, aged 28, while serving as a Captain with a Kite Balloon Section of the Royal Flying Corps in France at the Battle of the Somme. In the afternoon of 20 August 1916 on the Northern part of the Somme battlefield he was crewing a tethered un-powered observation balloon watching the German line near the village of Gommecourt, when its steel cable tether snapped, and the balloon, caught in an Easterly wind, began to drift towards enemy lines out of control. To avoid capture, Hallam bailed out of the balloon's basket but he was obstructed from jumping clear, and fell several hundred feet to his death after his emergency parachute failed to deploy. His body was buried at a British military cemetery at the nearby village of Couin.
