= The Nth Commandment =

1923 film by Frank Borzage

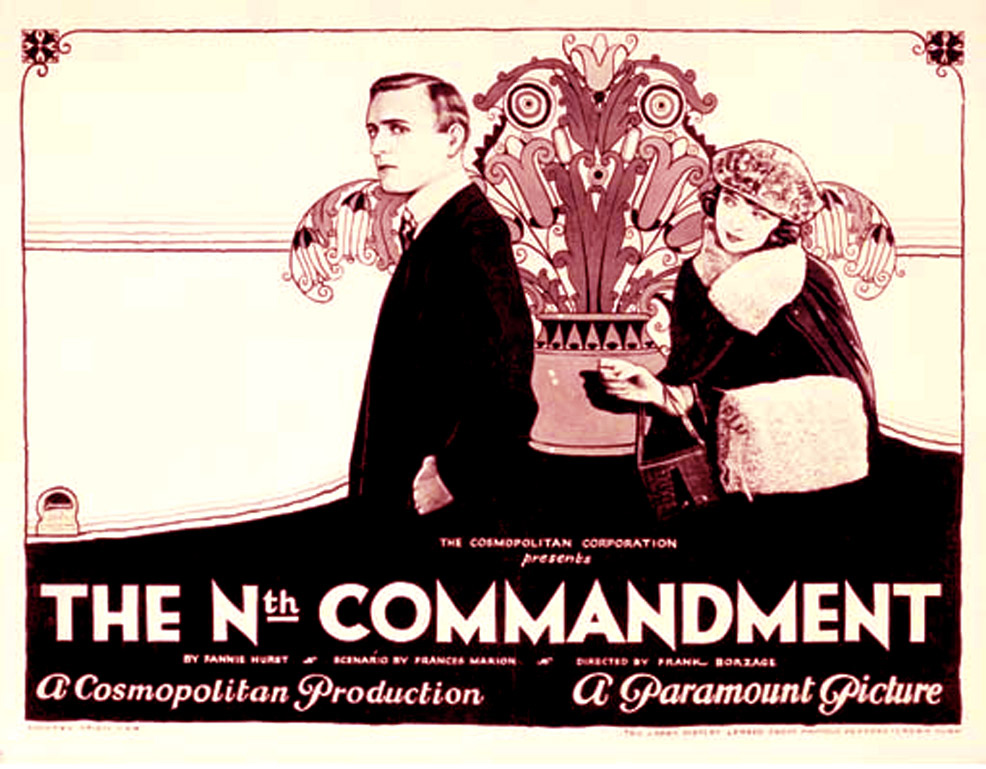
- Lobby poster
- Directed by: Frank Borzage
- Written by: Frances Marion (scenario)
- Based on: "The Nth Commandment" by Fannie Hurst
- Produced by: Cosmopolitan Productions
- Starring: Colleen Moore
- Cinematography: Chester A. Lyons
- Production company: Cosmopolitan Productions
- Distributed by: Paramount Pictures
- Release date: March 18, 1923
- Running time: 80 minutes
- Country: United States
- Language: Silent (English intertitles)

The Nth Commandment is a 1923 American silent drama film directed by Frank Borzage and starring Colleen Moore. It is based on a story, The Nth Commandment, by Fannie Hurst, a well-known novelist of the day.

The film's title jests somewhat Cecil B. DeMille's upcoming epic The Ten Commandments (1923) which was released later that same year.

== Cast ==
- Colleen Moore as Sarah Juke
- James W. Morrison as Harry Smith
- Eddie Phillips as Jimmie Fitzgibbons
- Charlotte Merriam as Angine Sprunt
- George Cooper as Max Plute
- Mary Marguerite as Little Girl (uncredited)

== Preservation ==
An incomplete copy of The Nth Commandment is in the Library of Congress collection.
