= Vane Featherston =

English actress (1864–1948)

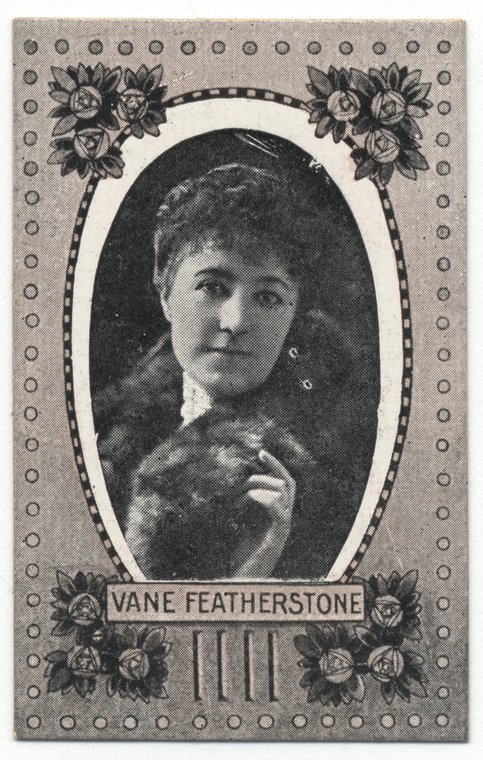
- Born: Alicia Frederica Vane Featherstonhaugh; 16 December 1864; London, England
- Died: 6 November 1948 (aged 83); Maidenhead, England
- Occupation: Actress

Alicia Frederica Vane Featherstonhaugh (1864–1948), known professionally as Vane Featherston, was an English theatre actress.

== Biography ==
Alicia Frederica Vane Featherstonhaugh was born in London on 16 December 1864.

She debuted at the Olympic Theatre, and had small roles in plays in other London theatres, initially as "Miss Vane". As her career progressed, she used the name "Miss Vane Featherston". In 1884, she joined Charles Hawtrey's company. She was eventually signed to a three-year engagement. Featherston has 33 credits listed in the book The London Stage 1890–1899: A Calendar of Productions, Performers, and Personnel alone. She also appeared in a number of Broadway plays from 1905 to 1922 and the film The Brass Bottle (1914).

On 16 August 1884, her image was published on the cover of Illustrated Sporting and Dramatic News. There are two photographs of her in the National Portrait Gallery, London.

She died at her home in Maidenhead on 6 November 1948.
