= Steele of the Royal Mounted =

1925 film

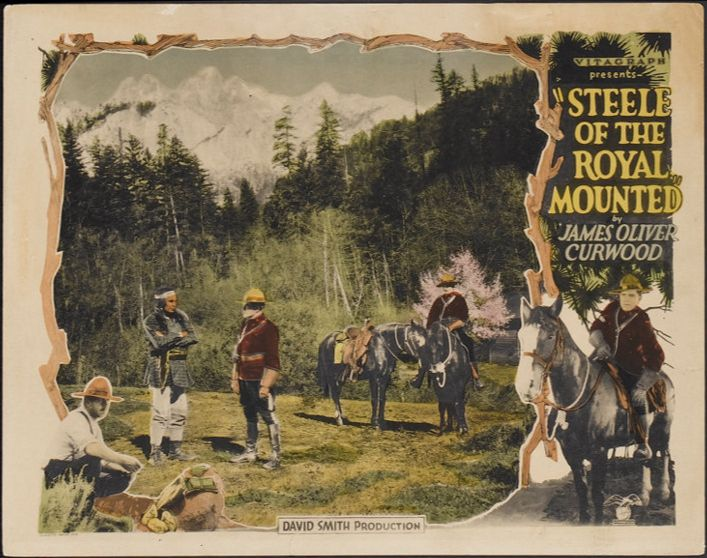
- Lobby card
- Directed by: David Smith
- Written by: Jay Pilcher
- Based on: Steele of the Royal Mounted by: James Oliver Curwood
- Produced by: Albert E. Smith
- Starring: Bert Lytell; Stuart Holmes; Charlotte Merriam
- Cinematography: W. Steve Smith Jr.
- Production company: Vitagraph Company of America
- Distributed by: Vitagraph Company of America
- Release date: June 15, 1925
- Running time: 60 minutes
- Country: United States
- Language: Silent (English intertitles)

Steele of the Royal Mounted is a 1925 American silent Western film directed by David Smith and starring Bert Lytell, Stuart Holmes and Charlotte Merriam. It is based on a novel by James Oliver Curwood about the Royal Canadian Mounted Police, and was shot on location in the San Bernardino National Forest.

== Plot ==
As described in a film magazine review, Isobel, an Eastern young woman, introduces Philip Steele to her father Colonel Becker, but as a trick implies that her father is her husband. Philip becomes disillusioned and goes to Canada and joins the North-West Mounted Police. Here he pursues a bad man. In the meantime, the young woman seeks him out so she can explain the mistake she made. When she finds him, he has bagged his man, and there is a reconciliation.

== Cast ==
- Bert Lytell as Philip Steele
- Stuart Holmes as Bucky Nome
- Charlotte Merriam as Isobel Becker
- Mabel Julienne Scott as Mrs. Thorpe
- Sidney De Gray as Colonel Becker
- John Toughey as Colonel MacGregor

== Bibliography ==
- Munden, Kenneth White. The American Film Institute Catalog of Motion Pictures Produced in the United States, Part 1. University of California Press, 1997.
