= Doris Lytton =

English actress (1893–1953)

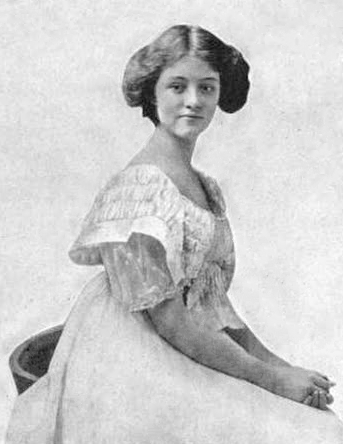
Doris Lytton, from a 1910 publication.

Doris Lytton (January 23, 1893 – December 2, 1953) was an English actress on stage and in silent films, and a businesswoman in the 1920s. Later, as Doris Lytton Toye, she wrote a cookbook tailored for post-war shortages, Contemporary Cookery (1947).

== Early life ==
Doris Lytton Partington was born in Manchester.

== Career ==
Doris Lytton performed in plays on the London stage from her girlhood, including The Conqueror (1905), For the Crown (1905), J. M. Barrie's Peter Pan (1907), Cicely Hamilton's feminist comedy Diana of Dobson's (1908, 1909), Might is Right (1909), Inconstant George (1910), Cosmo Hamilton's The Blindness of Virtue (1913), Never Say Die (1913), J. M. Barrie's Dear Brutus (1917), Husbands for All (1920), Reginald Berkeley's French Leave (1920), The Fulfilling of the Law (1921), A Matter of Fact (1921), Trespasses (1923), The Confession (1925), Harley Granville-Barker's The Madras House (1925-1926), Behold the Bridegroom (1931), King Queen Knave (1932), Suspect (1937).

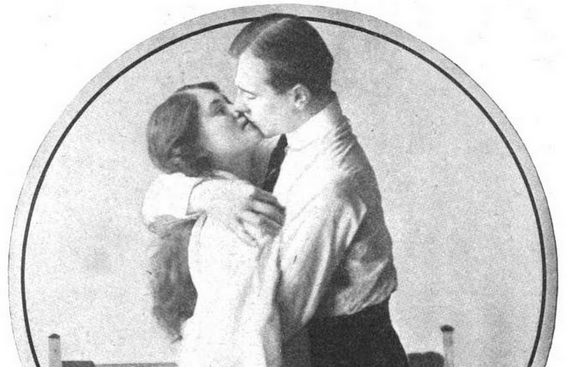
Doris Lytton as Effie and Basil Hallam as Archie, in Cosmo Hamilton's The Blindness of Virtue (1913).

Silent films featuring Doris Lytton included The Blue Bird (1910), The Brass Bottle (1914), The Single Man (1919), Mutiny (1925). She was also in the cast of a 1942 BBC Home Service production of The King Comes to His Own, a Biblical drama by Dorothy L. Sayers.

In 1920, Lytton opened a shop called "Cinderella" in the West End of London, offering repairs for "expensive evening dress shoes". A newspaper writer praised her effort as "an example of the new woman who has gone into business for herself and made good."

Lytton was known to sew and embroider backstage, and enjoyed cooking. "I have loved to cook ever since I was a wee thing and had a toy cook stove," she explained to an American reporter while on tour in the United States in 1913. From 1945 to 1947 Doris Lytton Toye wrote a monthly cookery column for Vogue magazine, with illustrations by Denton Welch. It featured advice particular to the rationing conditions in England during and after World War II. For example, it suggested barley or pasta as workable alternatives to rice, which was not available. A cookbook based on her columns, Contemporary Cookery, was published in 1947. The cookbook's additional illustrations were provided by John Minton.

== Personal life ==
Doris Lytton married opera composer and conductor Geoffrey Toye in 1915. They divorced before 1936. She died in London in 1953, aged 60 years, after falling from the window of her fifth floor apartment.
