= The Book Agent =

1917 American silent comedy film

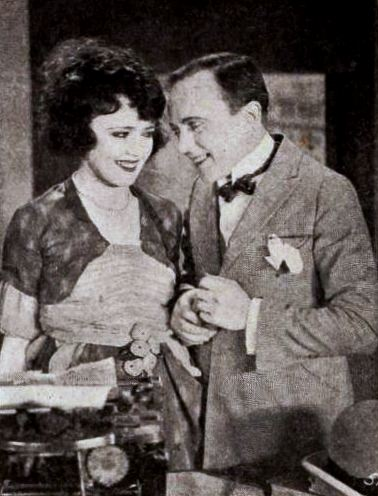
- Directed by: Otis Turner
- Written by: Walter Woods (story); F. McGrew Willis; Otis Turner
- Produced by: William Fox
- Starring: George Walsh; Doris Pawn; William Burress
- Cinematography: R. E. Irish
- Production company: Fox Film
- Distributed by: Fox Film
- Release date: May 14, 1917
- Running time: 50 minutes
- Country: United States
- Languages: Silent; English intertitles

The Book Agent is a 1917 American silent comedy film directed by Otis Turner and starring George Walsh, Doris Pawn, and William Burress.

== Cast ==
- George Walsh as Harry Kelly
- Doris Pawn as Mollie Lester
- William Burress as Crandall Barker
- Reginald Everett as Dana Sneed
- Willard Louis as Rev. A. Ginem
- Josef Swickard as Dr. Newdope
- Velma Whitman as Mollie's Mother
- Phil Gastrock as The Lawyer

== Bibliography ==
- Solomon, Aubrey. The Fox Film Corporation, 1915-1935: A History and Filmography. McFarland, 2011.
