= The Railroader =

1919 silent film

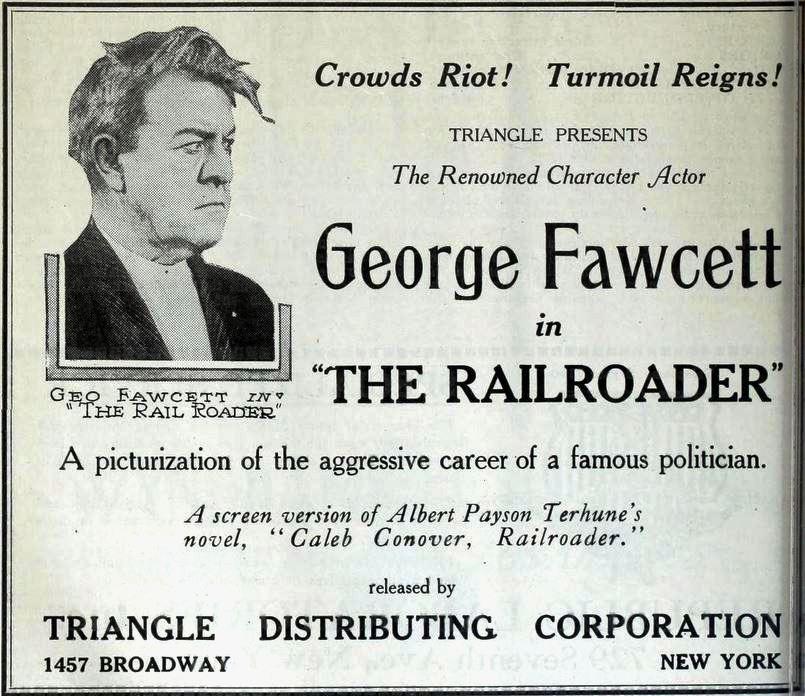
- Directed by: Colin Campbell
- Based on: Caleb Conover, Railroader by Albert Payson Terhune
- Starring: George Fawcett; Virginia True Boardman; Frank Elliott
- Production company: Triangle Film Corporation
- Distributed by: Triangle Distributing
- Release date: March 9, 1919
- Running time: 50 minutes
- Country: United States
- Language: Silent (English intertitles)

The Railroader is a 1919 American silent drama film directed by Colin Campbell and starring George Fawcett, Virginia True Boardman, and Frank Elliott.

== Cast ==
- George Fawcett as Caleb Conover
- Virginia True Boardman as Letty Conover
- Frank Elliott as Gerald Conover
- Velma Whitman as Blanche Conover
- Tom Santschi as Clive Standish
- Fritzi Brunette as Anice Lanier
- Goldie Colwell as Enid Montmorency

== Bibliography ==
- Donald W. McCaffrey & Christopher P. Jacobs. Guide to the Silent Years of American Cinema. Greenwood Publishing, 1999. ISBN 0-313-30345-2
