= The Brass Bottle (1914 film) =

1914 British film by Sidney Morgan

- Directed by: Sidney Morgan
- Based on: The Brass Bottle by Thomas Anstey Guthrie
- Produced by: Nicholas Ormsby-Scott
- Distributed by: World Film Company
- Release date: May 1914
- Country: United Kingdom
- Language: Silent film..(English intertitles)

The Brass Bottle is a 1914 British-produced silent fantasy film based on Thomas Anstey Guthrie's 1900 novel of the same name. It was directed by Sidney Morgan. The film was a joint production between the British and Americans whereas it was produced by and has an all-British cast but was distributed by the American World Film Company.

The film was remade in the United States by French director Maurice Tourneur in 1923 as The Brass Bottle. Both versions appear to be lost.

== Cast ==
- E. Holman Clark - Fakrash-al-Amash
- Alfred Bishop - Professor Futvoye
- Doris Lytton - Sylvia Futvoye
- Lawrence Grossmith - Horace Ventmire
- Tom Mowbray - Samuel Wackerbath
- Joseph R. Tozer - King Solomon (*as J.R. Tozer)
- Mary Brough - Mrs. Futovye
- Vane Featherston -
- Rudge Harding -
- Molly Farrell -

== Reviews ==
In the London Evening News the film was described as "artistic and very amusing".
