= The Brass Bottle (1964 film) =

1964 American film by Harry Keller

- Theatrical release poster
- Directed by: Harry Keller
- Screenplay by: Oscar Brodney
- Based on: The Brass Bottle by Thomas Anstey Guthrie
- Produced by: Robert Arthur
- Starring: Tony Randall; Burl Ives; Barbara Eden
- Cinematography: Clifford Stine
- Edited by: Ted J. Kent
- Music by: Bernard Green
- Distributed by: Universal Pictures
- Release date: May 20, 1964
- Running time: 87 minutes
- Country: United States
- Language: English

The Brass Bottle is a 1964 American fantasy-comedy film about a modern man who accidentally gains the friendship of a long-out-of-circulation genie. It stars Tony Randall, Burl Ives and Barbara Eden.

The film is based on the 1900 novel of the same title by Thomas Anstey Guthrie. The novel had been adapted for the screen twice before, in the silent film era, in 1914 and 1923. It inspired the American fantasy sitcom I Dream of Jeannie, starring Eden.

== Plot ==
The eccentric, unsuccessful architect Harold Ventimore is taking the next big step in his life: he has become engaged to his girlfriend Sylvia Kenton. Her father Anthony, an Egyptology professor, immediately interrupts a trip to Europe and returns to the United States to prevent Harold from marrying Sylvia. To make his future in-laws happy, Harold buys a large, sealable Middle Eastern brass bottle at an auction, only to discover that they had bought the same one the day before, so he takes the vase back with him.

When Harold opens the lid of the bottle, he unwittingly releases the djinn Fakrash Al-Amash, who was once imprisoned in the container by King Solomon 3,000 years ago. Harold, suspecting Fakrash is pulling a joke, calls the police, but when they arrive, the djinn has disappeared. The next day, he is visited by Samuel Wackerbath, who wants to build a new settlement and chooses Harold, granting him a generous advance. The djinn reappears, admitting that he put the idea in Wackerbath's ear. Harold's boss William Beevor suspects he is doing business behind his back and throws him out of the company. Harold uses the advance to open his own architect's office.

One evening, Harold invites Sylvia and her parents to dinner. He is horrified to discover that his living room has been transformed into a Middle Eastern dining room complete with slaves, harem girls, and even a belly dancer. The shocked Kentons start to leave, while Harold tells Anthony about the djinn and the bottle, but Anthony accuses him of insanity.

Fakrash tries to instigate Harold to end his relationship with Sylvia, offering him many women. When Harold replies that polygamy is forbidden in the US, the latter conjures up the beautiful Tezra, a princess of the blue djinn, dressed in a revealing harem outfit, but Harold insists on remaining faithful to Sylvia. Fakrash unsuccessfully tries to conjure away Tezra, as blue djinns have their own magic powers and she doesn't want to leave Harold. The next day, Sylvia visits Harold with a psychoanalyst but assumes he is cheating on her with Tezra and leaves.

Harold asks Fakrash to reveal himself to Anthony, who rudely rejects him; Fakrash turns Anthony into a mule. Harold takes Anthony in his car to Fakrash, who only turns him back into a human when Harold decides to set up a property company with Fakrash.

Six months later, Fakrash and Harold have ‘built’ over a thousand houses. The state authorities, realizing that such mass construction could not have been done in a short amount of time, open a commission of inquiry. When Harold testifies that Fakrash is a djinn, he is committed to a locked psychiatric ward. Fakrash seeks him out and defends him in court by displaying his powers, but this causes new problems. Fakrash explains that he can reset everything to the way it was before Harold met him, and he grants Harold's wish to do so. Harold returns with no memory of Fakrash to when Mr. Wackerbath visits him to offer him the settlement project. He also introduces him to his partner and his wife, though Harold does not recognize them as Fakrash and Tezra.

== Cast ==
- Tony Randall as Harold Ventimore, an architect seeking to improve his career. At this point in his career, Randall was one of Hollywood's leading supporting players, and this film represented a "rare opportunity" for him to get first billing.
- Burl Ives as Fakrash Al-Amash, an immensely powerful genie imprisoned by King Solomon in the titular bottle
- Barbara Eden as Sylvia Kenton, Harold's fiancée
- Kamala Devi as Tezra, a female blue genie
- Edward Andrews as Professor Anthony Kenton, Sylvia's father
- Lulu Porter as a belly dancer
- Richard Erdman as Seymour Jenks
- Kathie Browne as Hazel Jenks
- Ann Doran as Martha Kenton, Sylvia's mother
- Philip Ober as William Beevor, Harold's boss
- Parley Baer as Samuel Wackerbath, one of Harold's clients
- Howard Smith as Senator Grindle
- Herburt Vigran as Police Officer

== Production ==
The Brass Bottle was made on a modest budget and shot primarily on the back lot of Universal Studios, with a few exterior sequences made with rear screen projection, "giving the feature film the look of a standard sitcom from the era."

== Critical response ==
=== Contemporary ===
The New York Times critic A. H. Weiler found the film "about as funny as your own funeral", and dismissed it as "one of the duller fantasies dreamed up by Hollywood's necromancers."

=== Retrospective ===
Tony Mastroianni says The Brass Bottle is 'not a bad little movie" for what it is: "well-made but rather unpretentious." Craig Butler calls The Brass Bottle a "silly and fairly predictable comedy, the kind that Hollywood was making in the early 1960s before it figured out that people were more and more getting this kind of fluff on television, where it was more at home." While not a great comedy, it is "pleasant, amiable and diverting".

Jack G. Shaheen criticized the film for its usage of stereotypical images of Arabs. Fakrash transforms Harold's home to look more like Baghdad, but the depiction of this transformation is inaccurate and exoticized. Furthermore, the movie contains a stereotypical portrayal of a harem.

=== Home media ===
The Brass Bottle was released on DVD for Region 1 (U.S. and Canada only) as part of the Universal Vault Series in January 2010.

== Legacy ==
Eden's role was instrumental in getting her cast as the star of the TV series I Dream of Jeannie, even though she did not play a genie in this film.

== Remakes ==
This film was remade in Tamil by Javar Sitaraman as Pattanathil Bhootham (or Ghost in the City) in 1967.

== See also ==
- List of American films of 1964
- Old Khottabych
- Khottabych
