= The Last Outlaw (1919 film) =

1919 film directed by John Ford

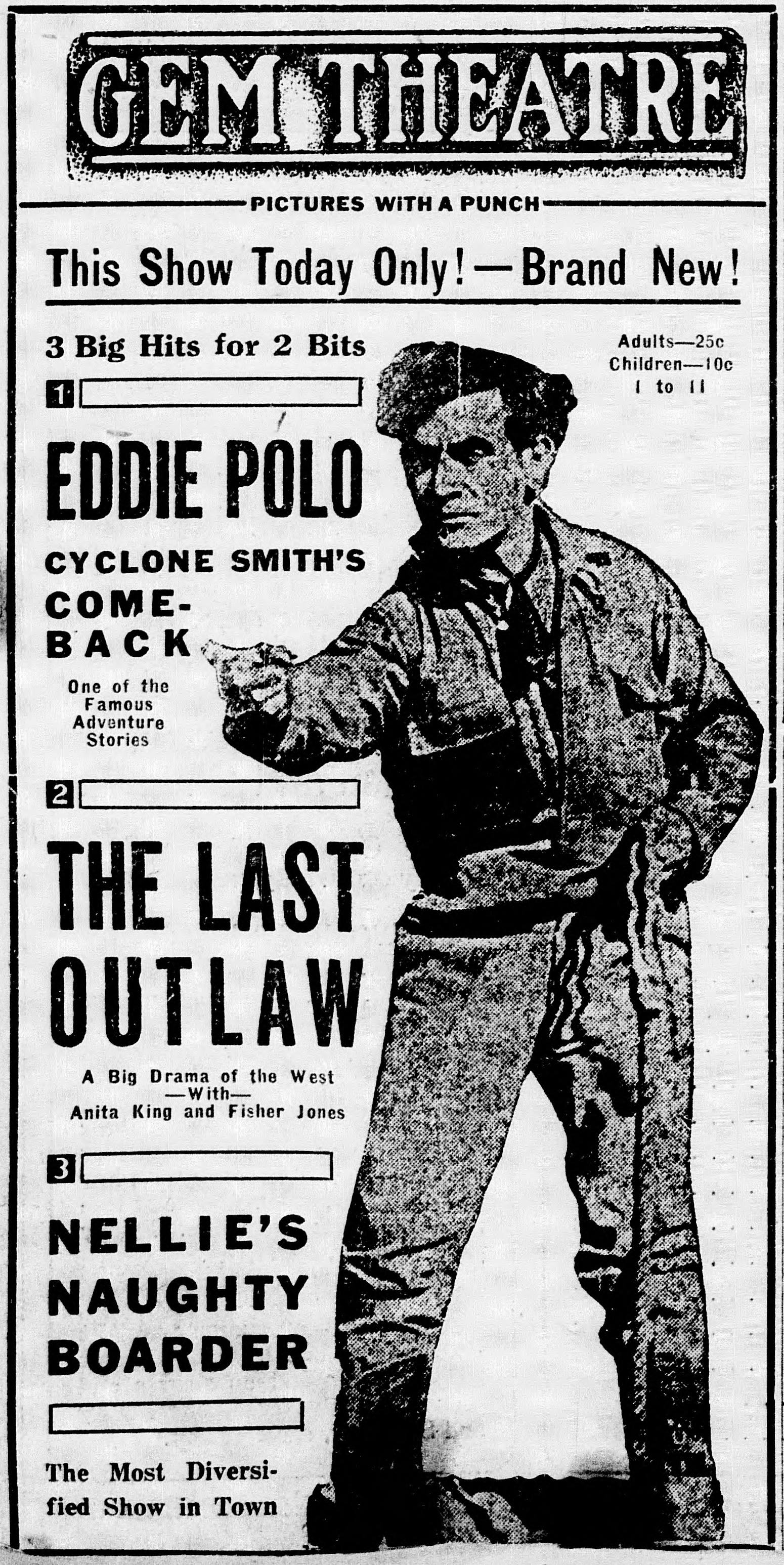
- Contemporary newspaper advertisement.
- Directed by: John Ford
- Written by: Evelyn Campbell; John Ford; H. Tipton Steck
- Starring: Edgar Jones
- Distributed by: Universal Film Manufacturing Company
- Release date: June 15, 1919
- Country: United States
- Languages: Silent; English intertitles

The Last Outlaw is a 1919 American short silent Western film directed by John Ford. Only the first reel of the film survives, in the British Film Institute film archive and in the Museum of Modern Art film archive. It was remade in 1936.

== Cast ==
- Edgar Jones
- Lucille Hutton
- Richard Henry Cummings
- Jack Walters
