= The Last Outlaw (1936 film) =

1936 film directed by Christy Cabanne

- Directed by: Christy Cabanne
- Screenplay by: John Twist; Jack Townley
- Story by: John Ford; E. Murray Campbell
- Produced by: Samuel J. Briskin; Robert Sisk
- Starring: Harry Carey; Hoot Gibson
- Cinematography: Jack MacKenzie
- Edited by: George Hively
- Music by: Alberto Colombo
- Production company: RKO Radio Pictures
- Distributed by: RKO Radio Pictures
- Release dates: June 12, 1936 (New York premiere); June 19, 1936
- Running time: 62 minutes
- Country: United States
- Language: English

The Last Outlaw is a 1936 American Western film directed by Christy Cabanne from a screenplay by John Twist and Jack Townley. The original story was credited to "E. Murray Campbell" (Evelyne Murray Campbell, who wrote it in 1919) and John Ford, who directed the 1919 version. Harry Carey starred in both versions.

RKO Radio Pictures previewed the film with a running time of 73 minutes. It was edited to 68 minutes, and finally released as a standard "program western" running 62 minutes. In the trade it was considered a "sleeper", with a novel storyline and treatment. Variety reported that studio executives were upset about the picture being mishandled, and that it might have succeeded as a higher-budgeted "A" picture. In recent years the UCLA Film Archives restored the film to 72 minutes; this is the version shown on Turner Classic Movies.

== Plot ==
Dean Payton is a notorious outlaw jailed in 1911. Twenty-five years later he is released, and finds that the world has moved on without him. His reputation as the terror of the west has been forgotten, and he has trouble adjusting to life in the city. He joins forces with the sheriff who originally caught him to track down the new terror, Al Goss.

== Cast ==
- Harry Carey as Dean Payton
- Hoot Gibson as Chuck Wilson
- Tom Tyler as Al Goss
- Henry B. Walthall as Cal Yates
- Margaret Callahan as Sally Mason
- Ray Mayer as Henchman
- Harry Jans as Jess - Henchman
- Frank M. Thomas as Dr. Charles Mason
- Russell Hopton as Sheriff Arthur Billings
- Frank Jenks as Deputy Tom
- Harry Woods as Traffic Cop
- Maxine Jennings as Billings's Secretary
- Ralph Byrd as Pilot
- Fred Scott as Larry Dixon, Singing Movie Cowboy
- Stanley Blystone as Jailer (uncredited)
- Alan Curtis as Driver (uncredited)
