= The Brass Bottle (novel) =

1900 novel by Thomas Anstey Guthrie

- 1946 edition
- Author: Thomas Anstey Guthrie
- Language: English
- Genre: Fantasy
- Publication date: 1900
- Publication place: United Kingdom
- Media type: Print

The Brass Bottle is a 1900 comedy novel by the British writer Thomas Anstey Guthrie, under the pen name of F. Anstey, about a man who awakens a genie. In a much later review George Orwell praised the work, and noted how strong an influence it had on William Aubrey Darlington's 1920 work Alf's Button.

== Film adaptations ==
It has been made into films on three occasions a 1914 British silent film The Brass Bottle, a 1923 American silent film The Brass Bottle, and a 1964 American sound film The Brass Bottle.

== Bibliography ==
- Goble, Alan. The Complete Index to Literary Sources in Film. Walter de Gruyter, 1999.
