= Alice Elizabeth Burton =

British-Canadian novelist and popular historian

Alice Elizabeth Burton or Aitken (4 October 1908 – 20 July 1990) was a British-Canadian novelist, journalist and popular historian.

== Early life and education ==
Born in Cairo to Richard Burton and Alice Gwendolyn (née Kerby, later Duck), she grew up in Windsor, Ontario. She later studied privately in Rome.

== Writing ==
In the 1940s, she wrote comic fantasy novels under the pseudonym Susan Alice Kerby. In Miss Carter and the Ifrit (1945), a Muslim spirit helped a spinster to find love during the Second World War. In Mr Kronion (1949), a Greek god defended English village life.

From 1945 to 1965, she was the London correspondent of a Canadian daily, the Windsor Star. Changing her surname by deed poll from Aitken to Burton in 1950, she published her historical writing as Elizabeth Burton.

== Personal life ==
In 1935, Burton married John Theodore Aitken at Windsor, Ontario. They were later divorced.

Burton died in Witney, Oxfordshire, in 1990.

== Works ==
=== Novels ===
As Alice Elizabeth Burton

- Cling to her, waiting. London: A. Dakers, 1939.

As Susan Alice Kerby

- Fortnight in Frascati. London: A. Dakers, 1940.
- Miss Carter and the Ifrit. London: Hutchinson, 1945.
- Many Strange Birds. London: Hutchinson, 1947. Published in the US as Fortune's Gift. New York: Dodd, Mead & Co., 1947.
- Gone to Grass: a novel. London: Hutchinson, 1948. Published in the US as The Roaring Dove. New York: Dodd, Mead & Co., 1948.
- Mr Kronion: a novel. London: Werner Laurie, 1949.

=== Historical writing ===
- The Elizabethans at Home. Secker & Warburg, 1958. Illustrated by Felix Kelly. Published in the US as The Pageant of Elizabethan England, Scribner, 1959.
- The Jacobeans at Home. Secker & Warburg, 1962. Illustrated by Felix Kelly. Published in the US as The Pageant of Stuart England, Scribner, 1962.
- Here is England. New York: Ariel Books, 1965.
- The Georgians at Home, 1714-1830. London: Longman, 1967. Illustrated by Felix Kelly. Published in the US as The Pageant of Georgian England, Scribner, 1967.
- The Early Victorians at Home, 1837-1861. London: Longman, 1972. Illustrated by Felix Kelly. Published in the US as The Pageant of Early Victorian England, Scribner, 1972.
- The Early Tudors at Home, 1485-1558. London: Allen Lane, 1976. Illustrated by Felix Kelly. Published in the US as The Pageant of Early Tudor England, Scribner, 1976.
