= William Aubrey Darlington =

British writer and journalist (1890–1979)

William Aubrey Cecil Darlington or W.A. Darlington (1890–1979), was a British writer and journalist who worked for many years as the drama critic of the Daily Telegraph newspaper.

== Life and career ==
Darlington was primarily a journalist, working as a drama critic for the New York Times and The Daily Telegraph.

Darlington also wrote novels, most successfully with his 1920 comic work Alf's Button which was adapted into several films. He wrote an autobiography, I Do What I Like.

He was educated at Shrewsbury School and St John’s, Cambridge, before joining the army during the First World War.

== Works ==
- Alf's Button (1920)
- Egbert (1925)
- Carpet Slippers (1931)
- I Do What I Like (MacDonald, 1947)
- The World of Gilbert and Sullivan (1950)
- Six Thousand and One Nights: Forty Years a Drama Critic (1960)
