= Thomas Anstey Guthrie =

English author (1856–1934)

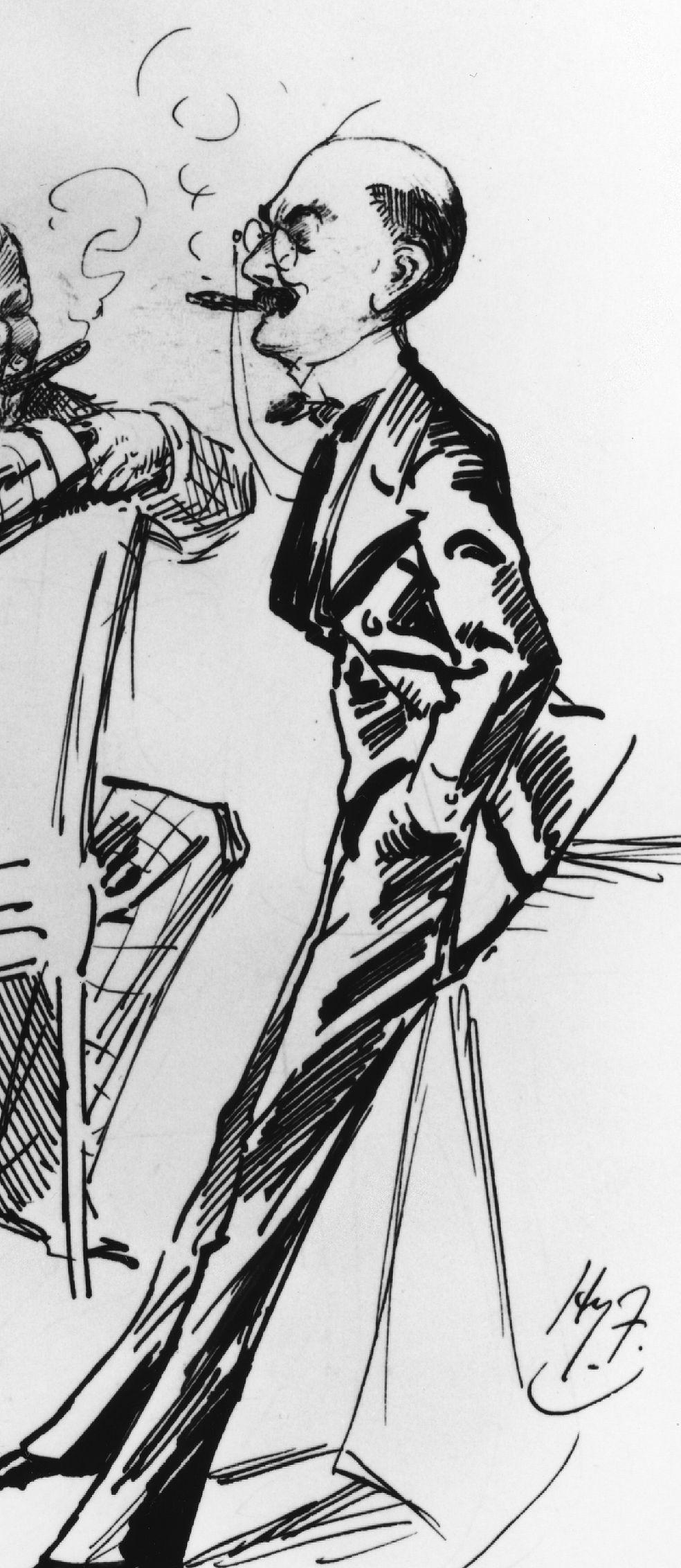
- Born: 8 August 1856
- Died: 10 March 1934 (aged 77)
- Occupation: Writer, humorist
- Language: English language

Sir Thomas Anstey Guthrie (8 August 1856 – 10 March 1934) was an English writer (writing as F. Anstey or F. T. Anstey), most noted for his comic novel Vice Versa about a boarding-school boy and his father exchanging identities. His reputation was confirmed by The Tinted Venus and many humorous parodies in Punch magazine.

== Early life and family ==
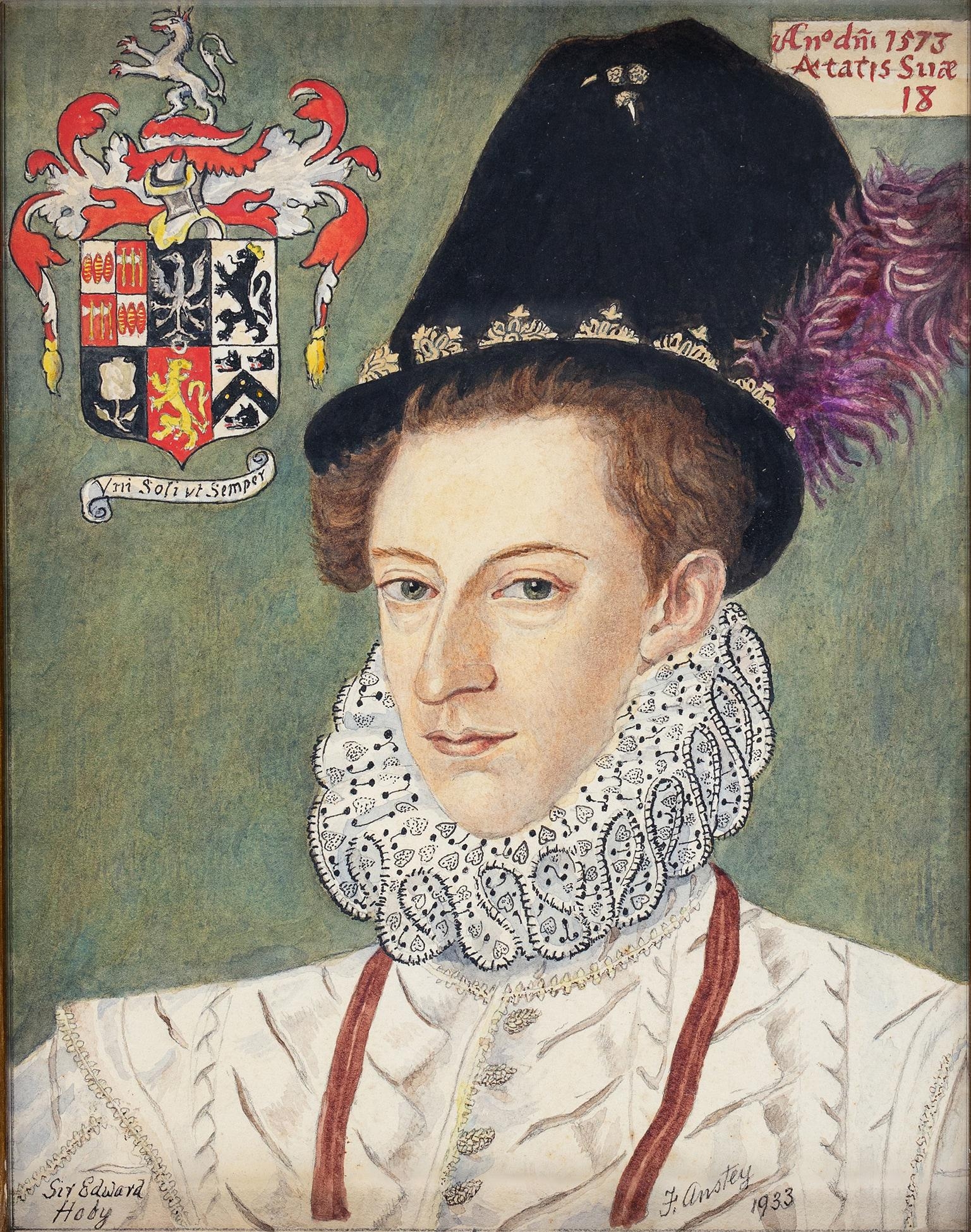
Edward Hoby (1560-1617) - 1933 watercolour by Guthrie, After the painting in Ipswich Museum

He was born in Kensington, London, to Augusta Amherst Austen, an organist and composer, and Thomas Anstey Guthrie. He was educated at King's College School and at Trinity Hall, Cambridge, and was called to the bar in 1880.

Guthrie's younger brother was the physician Leonard Guthrie (1858–1918).

== Writing career ==
The popular success of his story Vice Versa (1882) with its topsy turvy substitution of a father for his schoolboy son, at once made his reputation as a humorist of an original type. In 1883, he published a serious novel, The Giant's Robe, which George Gissing described as 'very poor stuff'. Anstey discovered (and again in 1889 with The Pariah) that it was not as a serious novelist but as a humorist that the public insisted on regarding him. As such, his reputation was further confirmed by The Black Poodle (1884), The Tinted Venus (1885), A Fallen Idol (1886), and other works.

Guthrie became an important member of the staff of Punch magazine, in which his voces populi and his humorous parodies of a reciter's stock-piece (Burglar Bill, &c.) represent his best work. In 1903, his successful farce The Man from Blankley's based on a story that originally appeared in Punch, was first produced by Sir Charles Hawtrey at the Prince of Wales Theatre, in London. It starred Hawtrey, Arthur Playfair and Faith Stone. After London, it played in New York, Washington DC, Detroit and Chicago. He wrote Only Toys (1903) and Salted Almonds (1906).

Many of Anstey's stories have been adapted into theatrical productions and motion pictures.

The Tinted Venus was adapted into a silent film, The Tinted Venus, in 1921.

The Tinted Venus was adapted by S. J. Perelman, Ogden Nash, and Kurt Weill into One Touch of Venus in 1943. A 1948 film, One Touch of Venus, was based on Guthrie's book and the musical.

Vice Versa was adapted as a play in 1883 and has been filmed many times, usually transposed in setting and without any credit to the original book. Another of his novels, The Brass Bottle, has also been filmed more than once, including The Brass Bottle (1964). His Tourmalin's Time Cheques (1891) is one of the earliest stories featuring the science fiction concept of intentional and frequent movement in time, and probably the first to investigate the practical paradoxes such a concept would create.

Guthrie wrote an autobiography, under both his pen and true names, in 1936 entitled A Long Retrospect.

== Death ==
Guthrie died on 10 March 1934.

== Selected publications ==
=== 1880s ===
- Vice Versa (1882)
- The Black Poodle And Other Tales (1884)
- The Giant's Robe (1884)
- The Tinted Venus (1885)
- A Fallen Idol (1886)
- Burglar Bill And Other Pieces (1888)
- The Pariah (1889)

=== 1890s ===
- Voces Populi (1890)
- Tourmalin's Time Cheques (1891)
- Mr. Punch's Model Music-Hall Songs And Dramas (1892)
- The Talking Horse And Other Tales (1892)
- The Travelling Companions (1892)
- The Man From Blankley's And Other Sketches (1893)
- Mr. Punch's Pocket Ibsen (1893)
- Under the Rose (1894)
- Lyre and Lancet (1895)
- The Statement of Stella Maberly, Written By Herself (1896) (First Italian Edition) La confessione di Stella Maberly, traduzione e cura di Piero Bocci, Independently Published, Amazon, 2025.
- Baboo Jabberjee, B. A. (1897)
- Puppets at Large (1897)
- Love Among The Lions (1898)
- Paleface And Redskin (1898)

=== 1900s ===
- The Brass Bottle (1900)
- A Bayard From Bengal (1902)
- Only Toys! (1903)
- Salted Almonds (1906)
- Winnie, An Everyday Story (1909)

=== Later ===
- In Brief Authority (1915)
- Percy and Others (1915)
- The Last Load (1925)
- The Would-Be Gentleman (Adapted From Molière's Le Bourgeois gentilhomme) (1927)
- The Imaginary Invalid (Adapted From Molière's Le Malade imaginaire) (1929)
- Humour and Fantasy (1931 – omnibus volume of short stories and four novels)
- A Long Retrospect (1936 – autobiography)
