= October 23 =

October 23 this year in various calendars
- Friday, 23 October 2026
Akan	Kurufie
Armenian	5 Trē 1476
Aztec	Atlcahualo 1, 1 Ocēlōtl
Babylonian	10 Tashritu, 2337 SE
Balinese pawukon	Luang, Pepet, Pasah, Menala, Pon, Paniron, Sukra of Dukut, Uma, Dangu, Duka
Bengali	7 Kartik, BS 1433
Chinese	Yang Metal Horse・Ox Mansion; Fire Horse Year, Month 9, Day 14 (Shuangjiang, 15 days until Lidong)
Common Era	23 October 2026 CE
Coptic	13 Paopi, AM 1743
Egyptian	10 Phamenoth, 2775 NE
Ethiopian	13 Ṭeqemt, 2019 Amätä Məhrät
French Republican	Décade I, Primidi de Brumaire de l'Année 235 de la République
Gregorian	23 October, AD 2026
Hebrew	12 Cheshvan, AM 5787
Hindu	Pūrvabhādrapada・Dhruva; Solar: 6 Kārtika, 1948 SE; Lunisolar: Dvādaśī, Śukla pakṣa of Āśvina, 2083 VE; Rāudra・5127 KY・1,872,871
Icelandic	Föstudagur, 30 Haustmánuður 2026
Islamic	11 Jumada al-awwal, AH 1448 (using tabular method)
ISO week date	2026-W43-5
Japanese	13 Nagatsuki, Reiwa 8 (Sōkō, 15 days until Rittō)
Julian	10 October, AD 2026 (AM 7535)
Julian day	2461337
Korean	13 Gaedal, 4359 DE
Maya	13.0.14.0.14; 7 Zac, 1 Ix
Roman	ante diem VI Idus Octobres, MMDCCLXXIX AUC
Solar Hijri	1 Aban, SH 1405
Tibetan	12 tha skar, me pho rta 2153 or 1772 or 1000

<<	October					>>
Su	Mo	Tu	We	Th	Fr	Sa
				1	2	3
4	5	6	7	8	9	10
11	12	13	14	15	16	17
18	19	20	21	22	23	24
25	26	27	28	29	30	31
2026

October 23 in recent years
2026 (Friday)
2025 (Thursday)
2024 (Wednesday)
2023 (Monday)
2022 (Sunday)
2021 (Saturday)
2020 (Friday)
2019 (Wednesday)
2018 (Tuesday)
2017 (Monday)

October 23 is the 296th day of the year (297th in leap years) in the Gregorian calendar; 69 days remain until the end of the year.

== Events ==
=== Pre-1600 ===
- 4004 BC – James Ussher's calculated First day of the world based on the Old Testament. Creation, he believed, occurred at what would have been nightfall on the previous day.
- 42 BC – Liberators' civil war: Mark Antony and Octavian decisively defeat an army under Brutus in the second part of the Battle of Philippi, with Brutus committing suicide and ending the civil war.
- 425 – Valentinian III is elevated as Roman emperor at the age of six.
- 502 – The Synodus Palmaris, called by Gothic king Theoderic, absolves Pope Symmachus of all charges, thus ending the schism of Antipope Laurentius.
- 1086 – Spanish Reconquista: At the Battle of Sagrajas, the Almoravids defeat the Castilians, but are unable to take advantage of their victory.
- 1157 – The Battle of Grathe Heath ends the Danish Civil War.
- 1295 – The first treaty forming the Auld Alliance between Scotland and France against England is signed in Paris.
- 1448 – Scotland wins a decisive victory over England at the Battle of Sark, the last pitched battle to be fought between the two kingdoms during the Medieval period.

=== 1601–1900 ===
- 1641 – Irish Catholic gentry from Ulster attempt to seize control of Dublin Castle, the seat of English rule in Ireland, so as to force concessions.
- 1642 – The Battle of Edgehill is the first major battle of the English Civil War.
- 1666 – The most intense tornado on record in English history, an F4 storm on the Fujita scale or T8 on the TORRO scale, strikes the county of Lincolnshire, with winds of more than 213 miles per hour (343 km/h).
- 1707 – The First Parliament of the Kingdom of Great Britain convenes.
- 1732 – The siege of Isfahan comes to an end when Safavid ruler Soltan Hoseyn capitulates to the besieging Afghan forces under Mahmud Hotak.
- 1798 – The forces of Ali Pasha of Janina defeat the French and capture the town of Preveza in the Battle of Nicopolis.
- 1812 – General Claude François de Malet begins a conspiracy to overthrow Napoleon, claiming that the Emperor died in the Russian campaign.
- 1850 – The first National Women's Rights Convention begins in Worcester, Massachusetts.
- 1856 – Second Opium War: Dissatisfied with imperial commissioner Ye Mingchen's reparations for the alleged slighting of a British-owned vessel and at Consul Harry Parkes's urging, British Rear-Admiral Michael Seymour launches an assault on the Barrier Forts outside Canton in the first military engagement of the Second Opium War.
- 1864 – American Civil War: The Battle of Westport is the last significant engagement west of the Mississippi River, ending in a Union victory.
- 1868 – Meiji Restoration: Having taken the shogunate's seat of power at Edo and declared it his new capital as Tokyo, Mutsuhito proclaims the start of the new Meiji era.
- 1882 – Assommoir bombing: Anarchists such as Fanny Madignier commit the first deadly anarchist attack in France.

=== 1901–present ===
- 1906 – Alberto Santos-Dumont flies an airplane in the first heavier-than-air flight in Europe.
- 1911 – The Italo-Turkish War sees the first use of an airplane in combat when an Italian pilot makes a reconnaissance flight.
- 1912 – First Balkan War: The Battle of Kumanovo between the Serbian and Ottoman armies begins.
- 1923 – German October: Due to a miscommunication with the party leadership, a militant section of the Communist Party of Germany launches an insurrection in Hamburg.
- 1924 – Second Zhili–Fengtian War: Warlord Feng Yuxiang, with the covert support of the Empire of Japan, stages a coup in Beijing against his erstwhile superiors in the Zhili clique, crippling their nearly victorious war effort against the Fengtian clique and forcing them to withdraw from northern China.
- 1927 – The Imatra Cinema is destroyed in a fire in Tampere, Finland, during showing the 1924 film Wages of Virtue; 21 people die in the fire and almost 30 are injured.
- 1940 – Adolf Hitler and Francisco Franco meet at Hendaye to discuss the possibility of Spain entering the Second World War.
- 1941 – The Holocaust: Nazi Germany prohibits Jews from emigrating, including in its occupied territories.
- 1942 – World War II: Allied forces commence the Second Battle of El Alamein, which proves to be the key turning point in the North African campaign.
- 1942 – All 12 passengers and crewmen aboard American Airlines Flight 28 are killed when it collides with a U.S. Army Air Force bomber near Palm Springs, California.
- 1942 – World War II: The Battle for Henderson Field begins on Guadalcanal.
- 1944 – World War II: The Battle of Leyte Gulf begins.
- 1945 – Jackie Robinson of the Kansas City Monarchs signs a contract with the Brooklyn Dodgers' minor league team, the Montreal Royals, breaking Major League Baseball's color barrier.
- 1955 – Prime Minister Ngô Đình Diệm defeats former emperor Bảo Đại in a referendum and founds the Republic of Vietnam.
- 1955 – The people of the Saar region vote in a referendum to unite with West Germany instead of France.
- 1956 – Secret police shoot several anti-communist protesters, igniting the Hungarian Revolution.
- 1958 – Canada's Springhill mining disaster kills seventy-five miners, while ninety-nine others are rescued.
- 1958 – Belgian artist Peyo's comic characters, the Smurfs, make their debut in Spirou magazine.
- 1959 – Aeroflot Flight 200 crashes while attempting to land at Vnukovo International Airport, killing 28.
- 1965 – Vietnam War: The 1st Cavalry Division (Airmobile), in conjunction with the Army of the Republic of Vietnam, launches an operation seeking to destroy Communist forces during the siege of Plei Me.
- 1970 – Gary Gabelich sets a land speed record in a rocket-powered automobile called the Blue Flame, fueled with natural gas.
- 1972 – Vietnam War: Operation Linebacker, a US bombing campaign against North Vietnam in response to its Easter Offensive, ends after five months.
- 1978 – Aeroflot Flight 6515 crashes off Syvash, killing all 26 people aboard.
- 1982 – A gunfight breaks out between police officers and members of a religious cult in Arizona. The shootout leaves two cultists dead and dozens of cultists and police officers injured.
- 1983 – Lebanese Civil War: The U.S. Marines Corps barracks in Beirut is hit by a truck bomb, killing 241 U.S. military personnel. A French Army barracks in Lebanon is also hit that same morning, killing 58 troops.
- 1989 – The Hungarian Republic officially replaces the communist Hungarian People's Republic.
- 1989 – Bankruptcy of Wärtsilä Marine, the biggest bankruptcy in the Nordic countries up until then.
- 1989 – An explosion at the Houston Chemical Complex in Pasadena, Texas, which registered a 3.5 on the Richter magnitude scale, kills 23 and injures 314.
- 1991 – Signing of the Paris Peace Accords which ends the Cambodian–Vietnamese War.
- 1993 – The Troubles: A Provisional IRA bomb prematurely detonates in Belfast, killing the bomber and nine civilians.
- 1995 – Yolanda Saldívar is found guilty of first-degree murder in the shooting death of popular Latin singer Selena.
- 1998 – Israel and the Palestinian Authority sign the Wye River Memorandum.
- 2001 – Apple Computer releases the iPod.
- 2002 – Second Chechen War: Chechen separatist terrorists seize the House of Culture theater in Moscow and take approximately 700 theater-goers hostage.
- 2004 – A powerful earthquake and its aftershocks hit Niigata Prefecture in northern Japan, killing 35 people, injuring 2,200, and leaving 85,000 homeless or evacuated.
- 2007 – A storm causes the Mexican Kab 101 oil platform to collide with a wellhead, leading to the death and drowning of 22 people during rescue operations after evacuation of the platform.
- 2007 – Space Shuttle Discovery is launched on STS-120, with Pamela Melroy becoming the second female space shuttle commander.
- 2011 – A powerful 7.2 magnitude earthquake strikes Van Province, Turkey, killing 582 people and injuring thousands.
- 2011 – The Libyan National Transitional Council deems the Libyan Civil War over.
- 2011 – Motorcycle racer Marco Simoncelli dies in a racing accident at the Malaysian Grand Prix.
- 2015 – The lowest sea-level pressure in the Western Hemisphere, and the highest reliably-measured non-tornadic sustained winds, are recorded in Hurricane Patricia, which strikes Mexico hours later, killing at least 13 and causing over $280 million in damages.
- 2017 – War against the Islamic State: Philippine defense secretary Delfin Lorenzana declares the end of the Siege of Marawi.
- 2020 – Second Libyan Civil War: The Second Libyan Civil War comes to an end as all parties to the 5+5 Joint Libyan Military Commission agree to a ceasefire.
- 2022 – Xi Jinping is elected as General Secretary of the Chinese Communist Party by the Central Committee, beginning a third term of the paramount leader of China.
- 2022 – Myanmar Air Force airstrikes a concert in Hpakant Township, Kachin state killing at least 80 people, including senior Kachin Independence Organisation officials, in the Hpakant massacre.

== Births ==
=== Pre-1600 ===
- 1006 – Wen Yanbo, Chinese grand chancellor (died 1097)
- 1255 – Ferdinand de la Cerda, Spanish noble (died 1275)
- 1491 (estimated) – Ignatius of Loyola, Catholic priest (died 1556)
- 1516 – Charlotte of Valois, French princess (died 1524)

=== 1601–1900 ===
- 1634 – Hedwig Eleonora of Holstein-Gottorp, Swedish queen (died 1715)
- 1654 – Johann Bernhard Staudt, Austrian composer (died 1712)
- 1698 – Ange-Jacques Gabriel, French architect, designed the École Militaire (died 1782)
- 1705 – Maximilian Ulysses Browne, Austrian field marshal (died 1757)
- 1713 – Pieter Burman the Younger, Dutch philologist, poet, and educator (died 1778)
- 1762 – Samuel Morey, American engineer (died 1843)
- 1766 – Emmanuel de Grouchy, Marquis de Grouchy, French general (died 1847)
- 1790 – Chauncey Allen Goodrich, American minister, lexicographer, and educator (died 1860)
- 1796 – Stefano Franscini, Swiss statistician and politician (died 1857)
- 1801 – Albert Lortzing, German singer-songwriter and actor (died 1851)
- 1805 – John Russell Bartlett, American linguist and historian (died 1886)
- 1813 – Ludwig Leichhardt, German-Australian explorer (died 1848)
- 1815 – João Maurício Vanderlei, Baron of Cotejipe, Brazilian politician (died 1889)
- 1817 – Pierre Larousse, French lexicographer and author (died 1875)
- 1822 – Gustav Spörer, German astronomer (died 1895)
- 1832 – Johan Gabriel Ståhlberg, Finnish priest and father of K. J. Ståhlberg, the first President of Finland (died 1873)
- 1835 – Adlai Stevenson I, American lawyer and politician, 23rd Vice President of the United States (died 1914)
- 1837 – Moritz Kaposi, Hungarian dermatologist (died 1902)
- 1844 – Robert Bridges, English poet and playwright (died 1930)
- 1857 – Juan Luna, Filipino painter and sculptor (died 1899)
- 1863 – Mirko Breyer, Croatian writer, bibliographer, antiquarian, and one of the notable alleged and false victims of the Stara Gradiška concentration camp (died 1946)
- 1865 – Neltje Blanchan, American historian and author (died 1918)
- 1869 – John Heisman, American football player and coach (died 1936)
- 1870 – Francis Kelley, Canadian-American bishop (died 1948)
- 1873 – William D. Coolidge, American physicist and engineer (died 1975)
- 1874 – Charles Kilpatrick, American runner and educator (died 1921)
- 1875 – Gilbert N. Lewis, American chemist and academic (died 1946)
- 1876 – Franz Schlegelberger, German judge and politician, Reich Ministry of Justice (died 1970)
- 1878 – Jaan Lattik, Estonian pastor and politician, 9th Estonian Minister of Foreign Affairs (died 1967)
- 1880 – Dominikus Böhm, German architect (died 1955)
- 1880 – Una O'Connor, Irish-American actress and singer (died 1959)
- 1883 – Hugo Wast, Argentine writer (died 1962)
- 1885 – Lawren Harris, Canadian painter and educator (died 1970)
- 1888 – Onésime Gagnon, Canadian scholar and politician, 20th Lieutenant Governor of Quebec (died 1961)
- 1892 – Speckled Red, American blues/boogie-woogie piano player and singer-songwriter (died 1973)
- 1894 – Rube Bressler, American baseball player (died 1966)
- 1894 – Emma Vyssotsky, American astronomer and academic (died 1975)
- 1896 – Hilario Abellana, Filipino politician (died 1945)
- 1896 – Lilyan Tashman, American actress (died 1934)
- 1897 – John Baker, English air marshal (died 1978)
- 1897 – Juan Ignacio Luca de Tena, Spanish writer (died 1975)
- 1899 – Bernt Balchen, Norwegian aviator (died 1973)
- 1900 – Douglas Jardine, Indian-English cricketer and lawyer (died 1958)

=== 1901–present ===
- 1902 – Robert Eberan von Eberhorst, Austrian engineer (died 1982)
- 1902 – Luther Evans, American political scientist and politician (died 1981)
- 1904 – Harvey Penick, American golfer and coach (died 1995)
- 1905 – Felix Bloch, Swiss physicist and academic, Nobel Prize laureate (died 1983)
- 1905 – Yen Chia-kan, Chinese lawyer and politician, President of the Republic of China (died 1993)
- 1905 – Gertrude Ederle, American swimmer (died 2003)
- 1908 – František Douda, Czech shot putter (died 1990)
- 1908 – Ilya Frank, Russian physicist and academic, Nobel Prize laureate (died 1990)
- 1909 – Zellig Harris, American linguist and methodologist (died 1992)
- 1910 – Richard Mortensen, Danish painter and educator (died 1993)
- 1910 – Hayden Rorke, American actor (died 1987)
- 1911 – Jack Keller, American hurdler (died 1978)
- 1915 – Simo Puupponen, Finnish writer (died 1967)
- 1918 – Augusta Dabney, American actress (died 2008)
- 1918 – James Daly, American actor (died 1978)
- 1918 – Paul Rudolph, American architect and academic, designed the Lippo Centre (died 1997)
- 1919 – Manolis Andronikos, Greek archaeologist and academic (died 1992)
- 1920 – Ted Fujita, Japanese-American meteorologist and academic (died 1998)
- 1920 – Bob Montana, American illustrator (died 1975)
- 1920 – Gianni Rodari, Italian writer (died 1980)
- 1920 – Vern Stephens, American baseball player (died 1968)
- 1922 – Jean Barker, Baroness Trumpington, English politician (died 2018)
- 1922 – Coleen Gray, American actress (died 2015)
- 1923 – Aslam Farrukhi, Indian-Pakistani linguist, author, and scholar (died 2016)
- 1923 – Ned Rorem, American composer and author (died 2022)
- 1923 – Frank Sutton, American actor (died 1974)
- 1924 – Arthur Brittenden, English journalist (died 2015)
- 1925 – Johnny Carson, American television host (died 2005)
- 1925 – Fred Shero, Canadian-American ice hockey player and coach (died 1990)
- 1927 – Sonny Criss, American saxophonist and composer (died 1977)
- 1927 – Dezső Gyarmati, Hungarian water polo player and coach (died 2013)
- 1927 – Leszek Kołakowski, Polish-English historian and philosopher (died 2009)
- 1928 – Zhu Rongji, Chinese engineer and politician, 5th Premier of the People's Republic of China (died 2026)
- 1929 – Luis Alarcón, Chilean actor (died 2023)
- 1929 – Shamsur Rahman, Bangladeshi poet and journalist (died 2006)
- 1930 – Boozoo Chavis, American zydeco pioneer, accordion player, singer-songwriter and bandleader (died 2001)
- 1930 – Unto Mononen, Finnish musician (died 1968)
- 1931 – Jim Bunning, American baseball player and politician (died 2017)
- 1931 – William P. Clark, Jr., American judge and politician, 12th United States National Security Advisor (died 2013)
- 1931 – Diana Dors, English actress (died 1984)
- 1931 – Johnny Kitagawa, Japanese businessman, and talent manager (died 2019)
- 1932 – Vasily Belov, Russian novelist, poet and playwright (died 2012)
- 1933 – Carol Fran, American singer-songwriter and pianist (died 2021)
- 1933 – Carlos Lemos Simmonds, sixth Vice President of Columbia (died 2003)
- 1934 – Caitro Soto, Afro-Peruvian musician (died 2004)
- 1935 – JacSue Kehoe, American neuroscientist (died 2019)
- 1936 – Charles Goodhart, English economist and academic
- 1936 – Philip Kaufman, American director, producer, and screenwriter
- 1937 – Johnny Carroll, American rockabilly musician (died 1995)
- 1937 – Carlos Lamarca, Brazilian captain (died 1971)
- 1937 – Deven Verma, Indian actor, director, and producer (died 2014)
- 1938 – Alan Gilzean, Scottish footballer and manager (died 2018)
- 1939 – Archie Fisher, Scottish folk musician, singer-songwriter, and radio presenter (died 2025)
- 1939 – Charlie Foxx, American R&B/soul singer and guitarist (died 1998)
- 1939 – C. V. Vigneswaran, Sri Lankan lawyer, judge, and politician, 1st Chief Minister of the Northern Province
- 1940 – Ellie Greenwich, American singer-songwriter and producer (died 2009)
- 1940 – Jane Holzer, American model, actress, producer, and art collector
- 1940 – Pelé, Brazilian footballer and actor (died 2022)
- 1941 – René Metge, French rally driver (died 2024)
- 1941 – Colin Milburn, English cricketer (died 1990)
- 1941 – Igor Smirnov, Moldovan engineer and politician, 1st President of Transnistria
- 1942 – Douglas Dunn, Scottish poet, critic, and academic
- 1942 – Bernd Erdmann, German footballer and manager
- 1942 – Anita Roddick, English businesswoman and activist, founded The Body Shop (died 2007)
- 1942 – Michael Crichton, American author and screenwriter (died 2008)
- 1943 – Alida Chelli, Italian actress and singer (died 2012)
- 1944 – Mike Harding, English singer-songwriter and comedian
- 1945 – Maggi Hambling, English sculptor and painter
- 1945 – Kim Larsen, Danish singer-songwriter and guitarist (died 2018)
- 1945 – Graça Machel, Mozambican politician and humanitarian
- 1945 – Ernie Watts, American saxophonist
- 1945 – Maury Yeston, American composer, lyricist, and music theorist
- 1946 – Graeme Barker, English archaeologist and academic
- 1946 – Alicia Borinsky, Argentine writer
- 1946 – Mel Martínez, American lawyer and politician, 12th United States Secretary of Housing and Urban Development
- 1946 – Miklós Németh, Hungarian javelin thrower
- 1947 – Abdel Aziz al-Rantisi, co-founder of the Palestinian movement Hamas (died 2004)
- 1947 – Kazimierz Deyna, Polish footballer (died 1989)
- 1947 – Greg Ridley, English bass player (died 2003)
- 1948 – Hermann Hauser, Austrian-English businessman, co-founded Acorn Computers and Olivetti Research Laboratory
- 1948 – Gerry Robinson, Irish-born British businessman, arts patron and television personality (died 2021)
- 1948 – Brian Ross, American journalist
- 1948 – Jordi Sabatés, Spanish musician (died 2022)
- 1949 – Krešimir Ćosić, Croatian soldier and politician
- 1949 – Oscar Martínez, Argentine theater actor
- 1949 – Nick Tosches, American journalist, author, and poet (died 2019)
- 1949 – Würzel, English singer and guitarist (died 2011)
- 1950 – Maths O. Sundqvist, Swedish businessman (died 2012)
- 1951 – Ángel de Andrés López, Spanish actor (died 2016)
- 1951 – Charly García, Argentine singer-songwriter and keyboard player
- 1951 – Fatmir Sejdiu, Kosovan academic and politician, 2nd President of Kosovo
- 1951 – David Wills, American country music singer-songwriter and guitarist
- 1952 – Pierre Moerlen, French drummer (died 2005)
- 1952 – Ken Tipton, American actor, director, producer, and screenwriter
- 1953 – Taner Akçam, Turkish sociologist and historian
- 1953 – Joaquín Lavín, Chilean politician and economist
- 1953 – Pauline Black, English singer, actress and author
- 1954 – Ang Lee, Taiwanese-American director, producer, and screenwriter
- 1955 – Toshio Hosokawa, Japanese composer
- 1956 – Adam Nawałka, Polish football player and manager
- 1956 – Darrell Pace, American archer
- 1956 – Dianne Reeves, American singer
- 1956 – Dwight Yoakam, American singer-songwriter, guitarist, and actor
- 1957 – Paul Kagame, Rwandan soldier and politician, 6th President of Rwanda
- 1957 – Graham Rix, English footballer and coach
- 1957 – Martin Luther King III, American human rights activist, philanthropist and advocate
- 1958 – Michael Eric Dyson, American activist, author, and academic
- 1958 – Rose Nabinger, German singer
- 1958 – Frank Schaffer, German sprinter
- 1959 – "Weird Al" Yankovic, American comedy musician, writer, and actor
- 1959 – Sam Raimi, American director, screenwriter and producer
- 1960 – Mirwais Ahmadzaï, Swiss-French keyboard player, songwriter, and producer
- 1960 – Katoucha Niane, French model and actress (died 2008)
- 1960 – Randy Pausch, American author and academic (died 2008)
- 1960 – Wayne Rainey, American motorcycle racer
- 1961 – Laurie Halse Anderson, American author
- 1961 – Vinicio Gómez, Guatemalan politician (died 2008)
- 1961 – Andoni Zubizarreta, Spanish footballer and sportscaster
- 1963 – Gordon Korman, Canadian-American author
- 1963 – Rashidi Yekini, Nigerian footballer (died 2012)
- 1964 – Eddy Cue, American computer scientist and businessman
- 1964 – Robert Trujillo, American bass player and songwriter
- 1965 – Augusten Burroughs, American author and screenwriter
- 1965 – Al Leiter, American baseball player and sportscaster
- 1966 – Alex Zanardi, Italian racing driver and cyclist (died 2026)
- 1967 – Dale Crover, American musician
- 1967 – Omar Linares, Cuban baseball player
- 1967 – Jaime Yzaga, Peruvian tennis player
- 1969 – Dolly Buster, Czech film producer and director, actress and author
- 1969 – Trudi Canavan, Australian author and illustrator
- 1969 – Bill O'Brien, American football player and coach
- 1969 – Brooke Theiss, American actress
- 1970 – Matthew Barzun, American diplomat, United States Ambassador to the United Kingdom
- 1970 – Grant Imahara, American television presenter and engineer (died 2020)
- 1970 – Kenji Nomura, Japanese voice actor
- 1970 – Zoe Wiseman, American model and photographer
- 1971 – Carlo Forlivesi, Italian-Japanese composer and scholar
- 1971 – Chris Horner, American cyclist
- 1972 – Tiffeny Milbrett, American soccer player
- 1972 – Dominika Paleta, Polish-Mexican actress
- 1972 – Eduardo Paret, Cuban baseball player
- 1972 – Bryan Pratt, American lawyer and politician
- 1972 – Jasmin St. Claire, Virgin Islander-American actress
- 1972 – Jimmy Wayne, American singer-songwriter and guitarist
- 1973 – Christian Dailly, Scottish footballer
- 1974 – Aravind Adiga, Indian journalist and author
- 1974 – Beatrice Faumuina, New Zealand discus thrower
- 1974 – Sander Westerveld, Dutch footballer
- 1974 – Christine Yoshikawa, Canadian pianist
- 1975 – Michelle Beadle, American sportscaster
- 1975 – Odalys García, Cuban actress
- 1975 – Phillip Gillespie, Australian cricket umpire
- 1975 – Jessicka, American singer-songwriter
- 1975 – Yoon Son-ha, South Korean actress and singer
- 1975 – Keith Van Horn, American basketball player
- 1975 – Manuela Velasco, Spanish actress
- 1976 – Cat Deeley, English model, actress, and television host
- 1976 – Sergio Diduch, Argentine footballer
- 1976 – Ryan Reynolds, Canadian-American actor and producer
- 1977 – Brad Haddin, Australian cricketer
- 1977 – Alex Tudor, English cricketer and coach
- 1978 – Jimmy Bullard, English footballer
- 1978 – Steve Harmison, English cricketer and sportscaster
- 1978 – John Lackey, American baseball player
- 1978 – Archie Thompson, New Zealand-Australian footballer
- 1979 – Ramón Castro, Venezuelan baseball player
- 1979 – Simon Davies, Welsh footballer
- 1979 – Lynn Greer, American basketball player
- 1979 – Prabhas, Telugu film actor
- 1979 – Jorge Solís, Mexican boxer
- 1979 – Bud Smith, American baseball player
- 1980 – Mate Bilić, Croatian footballer
- 1980 – Pedro Liriano, Dominican baseball player
- 1981 – Daniela Alvarado, Venezuelan actress
- 1981 – Jeroen Bleekemolen, Dutch racing driver
- 1981 – Leticia Dolera, Spanish actress
- 1981 – Ben Francisco, American baseball player
- 1981 – Lee Ki-woo, South Korean actor
- 1981 – Mirel Rădoi, Romanian footballer
- 1982 – Valentin Badea, Romanian footballer
- 1982 – Kristjan Kangur, Estonian basketball player
- 1982 – Aleksandar Luković, Serbian footballer
- 1982 – Rickey Paulding, American basketball player
- 1982 – Rodolfo, Brazilian footballer
- 1983 – Filippos Darlas, Greek footballer
- 1983 – Valentin Demyanenko, Ukrainian-born Azerbaijani canoeist
- 1983 – Goldie Harvey, Nigerian singer-songwriter (died 2013)
- 1984 – Izabel Goulart, Brazilian model
- 1984 – Jeffrey Hoogervorst, Dutch footballer
- 1984 – Simone Masini, Italian footballer
- 1984 – Meghan McCain, American journalist, author, and television personality
- 1984 – Michael Sim, Australian golfer
- 1984 – Keiren Westwood, English footballer
- 1985 – Mohammed Abdellaoue, Norwegian footballer
- 1985 – Masiela Lusha, Albanian-American actress, poet, and humanitarian
- 1985 – Miguel, American singer-songwriter and producer
- 1985 – Chris Neal, English footballer
- 1985 – Luca Spinetti, Italian footballer
- 1985 – Panagiotis Vouis, Greek footballer
- 1986 – Emilia Clarke, English actress
- 1986 – Briana Evigan, American actress and dancer
- 1986 – Inbar Lavi, Israeli actress
- 1986 – Jovanka Radičević, Montenegrin handball player
- 1986 – Jake Robinson, English footballer
- 1986 – Jessica Stroup, American actress
- 1987 – Carmella, American wrestler
- 1987 – Robin Copeland, Irish rugby player
- 1987 – Félix Doubront, Venezuelan baseball player
- 1987 – Faye, Swedish singer-songwriter
- 1987 – Kyle Gibson, American baseball player
- 1987 – Seo In-guk, South Korean singer and actor
- 1987 – Miyuu Sawai, Japanese model and actress
- 1987 – Naomi Watanabe, Japanese actress
- 1988 – Jordan Crawford, American basketball player
- 1988 – Aleksandr Salugin, Russian footballer
- 1988 – Carolin Schiewe, German footballer
- 1989 – Viktor Agardius, Swedish footballer
- 1989 – Alain Baroja, Venezuelan footballer
- 1989 – Zach Brown, American football player
- 1989 – Jonita Gandhi, Indo-Canadian singer
- 1989 – Anisya Kirdyapkina, Russian race walker
- 1989 – Andriy Yarmolenko, Ukrainian footballer
- 1991 – Emil Forsberg, Swedish footballer
- 1991 – Princess Mako of Akishino, member of the Japanese Imperial Family
- 1991 – Jorge Taufua, Australian rugby league player
- 1992 – Álvaro Morata, Spanish footballer
- 1993 – Josh Ruffels, English footballer
- 1994 – Margaret Qualley, American actress
- 1995 – Ireland Baldwin, American model
- 1997 – Nick Bosa, American football player
- 1997 – Élie Okobo, French basketball player
- 1997 – Jaydn Su'A, New Zealand rugby league player
- 1997 – Minnie, Thai singer
- 1998 – Amandla Stenberg, American actress
- 1998 – Jordan Goodwin, American basketball player
- 1999 – Yui Kobayashi, Japanese idol
- 2002 – Ningning, Chinese singer
- 2003 – Jacob Bethell, English cricketer
- 2004 – Niccolò Pisilli, Italian footballer

== Deaths ==
=== Pre-1600 ===
- 42 BC – Marcus Junius Brutus the Younger, Roman general and politician (born 85 BC)
- 877 – Ignatios of Constantinople, Byzantine patriarch (born 797)
- 891 – Yazaman al-Khadim, Abbasid general and politician
- 902 – Ibrahim II of Ifriqiya, Aghlabid emir (born 850)
- 930 – Daigo, Japanese emperor (born 885)
- 945 – Hyejong of Goryeo, Korean king (born 912)
- 949 – Yōzei, Japanese emperor (born 869)
- 1134 – Abu al-Salt, Andalusian polymath
- 1157 – Sweyn III, Danish king (born c. 1125)
- 1456 – John of Capistrano, Italian priest and saint (born 1386)
- 1550 – Tiedemann Giese, Polish bishop (born 1480)
- 1581 – Michael Neander, German mathematician and astronomer (born 1529)

=== 1601–1900 ===
- 1616 – Leonhard Hutter, German theologian and academic (born 1563)
- 1688 – Charles du Fresne, sieur du Cange, French philologist and historian (born 1610)
- 1730 – Anne Oldfield, English actress (born 1683)
- 1764 – Emmanuel-Auguste de Cahideuc, Comte Dubois de la Motte, French admiral (born 1683)
- 1774 – Michel Benoist, French missionary and astronomer (born 1715)
- 1852 – Georg August Wallin, Finnish explorer, orientalist, and professor (born 1811)
- 1867 – Franz Bopp, German linguist and academic (born 1791)
- 1869 – Edward Smith-Stanley, 14th Earl of Derby, English lawyer and politician, Prime Minister of the United Kingdom (born 1799)
- 1872 – Théophile Gautier, French journalist, author, and poet (born 1811)
- 1885 – Charles S. West, American lawyer, jurist, and politician, Secretary of State of Texas (born 1829)
- 1893 – Alexander of Battenberg (born 1857)

=== 1901–present ===
- 1910 – Chulalongkorn, Thai king (born 1853)
- 1915 – W. G. Grace, English cricketer and physician (born 1848)
- 1916 – Richard McFadden, Scottish footballer and soldier (born 1889)
- 1917 – Eugène Grasset, Swiss illustrator (born 1845)
- 1921 – John Boyd Dunlop, Scottish businessman, founded Dunlop Rubber (born 1840)
- 1933 – Maurice de la Taille, French Jesuit priest (born 1872)
- 1935 – Charles Demuth, American painter and educator (born 1883)
- 1939 – Zane Grey, American dentist and author (born 1872)
- 1942 – Ralph Rainger, American pianist and composer (born 1901)
- 1943 – Wakashima Gonshirō, Japanese sumo wrestler, the 21st Yokozuna (born 1876)
- 1944 – Charles Glover Barkla, English-Scottish physicist and academic, Nobel Prize laureate (born 1877)
- 1944 – Hana Brady, Czech holocaust victim (born 1931)
- 1950 – Al Jolson, Lithuanian-American actor and singer (born 1886)
- 1953 – Adrien de Noailles, French son of Jules Charles Victurnien de Noailles (born 1869)
- 1959 – George Bouzianis, Greek painter (born 1885)
- 1959 – Gerda Lundequist, Swedish actress (born 1871)
- 1964 – Frank Luther Mott, American historian and journalist (born 1886)
- 1969 – Tommy Edwards, American singer-songwriter (born 1922)
- 1975 – Marjorie Maynard British artist and farmer (born 1891)
- 1978 – Maybelle Carter, American singer and autoharp player (Carter Family) (born 1909)
- 1980 – Tibor Rosenbaum, Hungarian-born Swiss rabbi and businessman (born 1923)
- 1983 – Jessica Savitch, American journalist (born 1947)
- 1984 – Oskar Werner, Austrian-German actor (born 1922)
- 1986 – Edward Adelbert Doisy, American biochemist and academic, Nobel Prize laureate (born 1893)
- 1988 – Asashio Tarō III, Japanese sumo wrestler, the 46th Yokozuna (born 1929)
- 1989 – Armida, Mexican-American actress, singer, and dancer (born 1911)
- 1990 – Thomas Williams, American author and academic (born 1926)
- 1994 – Robert Lansing, American actor (born 1928)
- 1996 – Bob Grim, American baseball player (born 1930)
- 1997 – Bert Haanstra, Dutch director, producer, and screenwriter (born 1916)
- 1998 – Barnett Slepian, American physician (born 1946)
- 1998 – Eric Ambler, English author, screenwriter, and producer (born 1909)
- 1999 – Eric Reece, Australian politician, 32nd Premier of Tasmania (born 1909)
- 2000 – Yokozuna, American wrestler (born 1966)
- 2001 – Josh Kirby, English illustrator (born 1928)
- 2001 – Daniel Wildenstein, French art dealer and historian (born 1917)
- 2002 – Adolph Green, American playwright and songwriter (born 1915)
- 2003 – Tony Capstick, English actor and singer (born 1944)
- 2003 – Soong Mei-ling, Chinese wife of Chiang Kai-shek, 2nd First Lady of the Republic of China (born 1898)
- 2004 – Robert Merrill, American actor and singer (born 1919)
- 2004 – Bill Nicholson, English footballer, coach, and manager (born 1919)
- 2005 – William Hootkins, American actor (born 1948)
- 2005 – John Muth, American economist and academic (born 1930)
- 2005 – Stella Obasanjo, Nigerian wife of Olusegun Obasanjo, 10th First Lady of Nigeria (born 1945)
- 2006 – Lebo Mathosa, South African singer (Boom Shaka) (born 1977)
- 2007 – John Ilhan, Turkish-Australian businessman, founded Crazy John's (born 1965)
- 2007 – Lim Goh Tong, Malaysian-Chinese businessman (born 1918)
- 2008 – Kevin Finnegan, English boxer (born 1948)
- 2009 – Lou Jacobi, Canadian-American actor (born 1913)
- 2010 – Fran Crippen, American swimmer (born 1984)
- 2010 – Stanley Tanger, American businessman and philanthropist, founded the Tanger Factory Outlet Centers (born 1923)
- 2011 – Herbert A. Hauptman, American chemist and mathematician, Nobel Prize laureate (born 1917)
- 2011 – Marco Simoncelli, Italian motorcycle racer (born 1987)
- 2012 – William Joel Blass, American lawyer and politician (born 1917)
- 2012 – Wilhelm Brasse, Polish photographer (born 1917)
- 2012 – Roland de la Poype, French soldier and pilot (born 1920)
- 2012 – Sunil Gangopadhyay, Indian author and poet (born 1934)
- 2012 – Michael Marra, Scottish singer-songwriter (born 1952)
- 2013 – Wes Bialosuknia, American basketball player (born 1945)
- 2013 – Anthony Caro, English sculptor and academic (born 1924)
- 2013 – Niall Donohue, Irish hurler (born 1990)
- 2013 – Gypie Mayo, English guitarist and songwriter (Dr. Feelgood and The Yardbirds) (born 1951)
- 2013 – Bill Mazer, Ukrainian-American journalist and sportscaster (born 1920)
- 2014 – Ghulam Azam, Bangladeshi politician (born 1922)
- 2014 – John Bramlett, American football player (born 1941)
- 2014 – Bernard Mayes, English-American journalist and academic (born 1929)
- 2014 – Joan Quigley, American astrologer and author (born 1927)
- 2014 – Tullio Regge, Italian physicist and academic (born 1931)
- 2014 – Alvin Stardust, English singer and actor (born 1942)
- 2015 – Leon Bibb, American-Canadian singer (born 1922)
- 2015 – Roger De Clerck, Belgian businessman (born 1924)
- 2015 – Jim Roberts, Canadian-American ice hockey player and coach (born 1940)
- 2015 – Fred Sands, American businessman and philanthropist, co-founded the Museum of Contemporary Art (born 1938)
- 2016 – Jack Chick, American cartoonist and publisher (born 1924)
- 2016 – Wim van der Voort, Dutch speed skater (born 1923)
- 2016 – Pete Burns, English singer-songwriter (born 1959)
- 2017 – Walter Lassally, German cinematographer (born 1926)
- 2018 – Todd Reid, Australian tennis player (born 1984)
- 2020 – Jerry Jeff Walker, American singer-songwriter (born 1942)
- 2022 – Adriano Moreira, Portuguese politician, Minister of the Overseas Provinces, President of the CDS – People's Party (born 1922)
- 2023 – Aira Samulin, Finnish entrepreneur and dance teacher (born 1927)
- 2023 – Bishan Singh Bedi, Indian cricketer (born 1946)
- 2024 – Geoff Capes, British shot putter and strongman (born 1949)
- 2024 – Gary Indiana, American writer, playwright and poet (born 1950)
- 2024 – Jack Jones, American singer and actor (born 1938)
- 2025 – June Lockhart, American actress (b. 1925)

== Holidays and observances ==
- Christian feast day:
  - Feast of the Most Holy Redeemer
  - James the Just (i.e. James, brother of Jesus) (Lutheran, Episcopal Church (USA), Eastern Orthodox)
  - Æthelflæd of Romsey
  - Allucio of Campugliano
  - Amon of Toul (Diocese of Toul)
  - Boethius
  - Ignatios of Constantinople
  - John of Capistrano
  - Joséphine Leroux
  - Paul Tong Viet Buong
  - Peter Pascual
  - Romain (Romanus) of Rouen
  - Servandus and Cermanus
  - Severin of Cologne
  - Blessed Thomas Thwing
  - October 23 (Eastern Orthodox liturgics)
  - Christmas or the Feast of Señor Noemi (the Child Jesus) in the Apostolic Catholic Church
- Mole Day (International observance)
