= Lisle Leigh =

American actress (1869–1927)

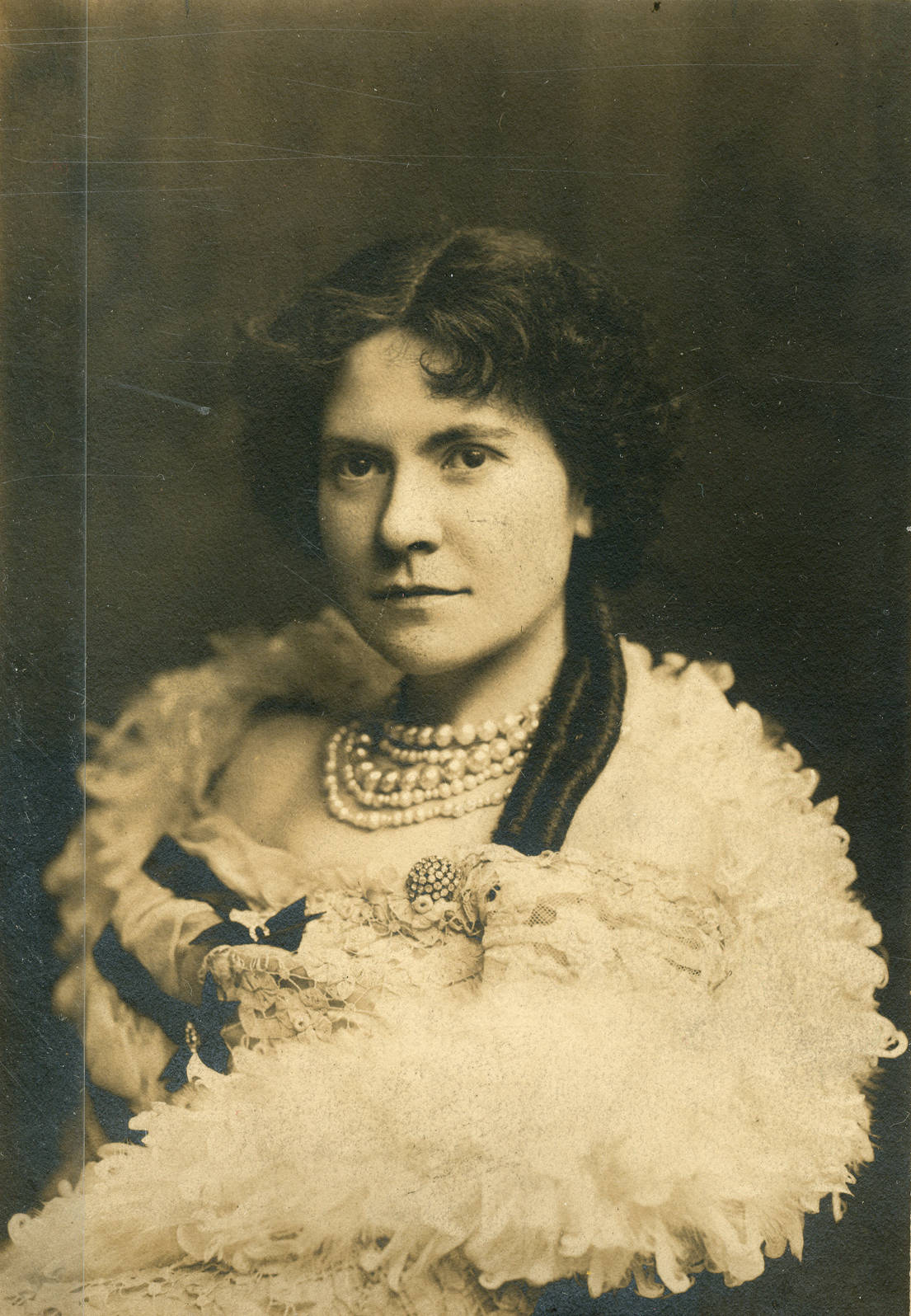

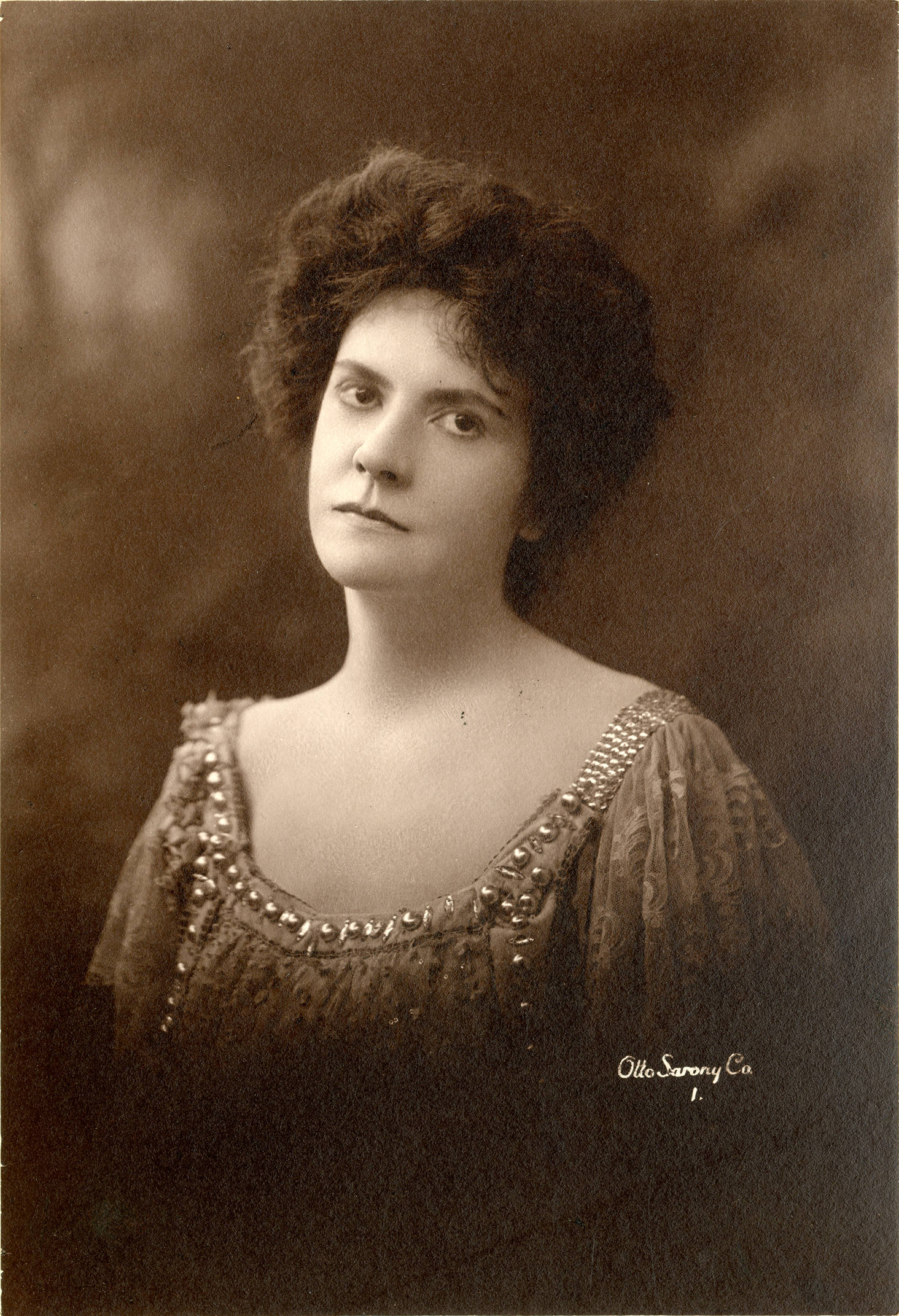

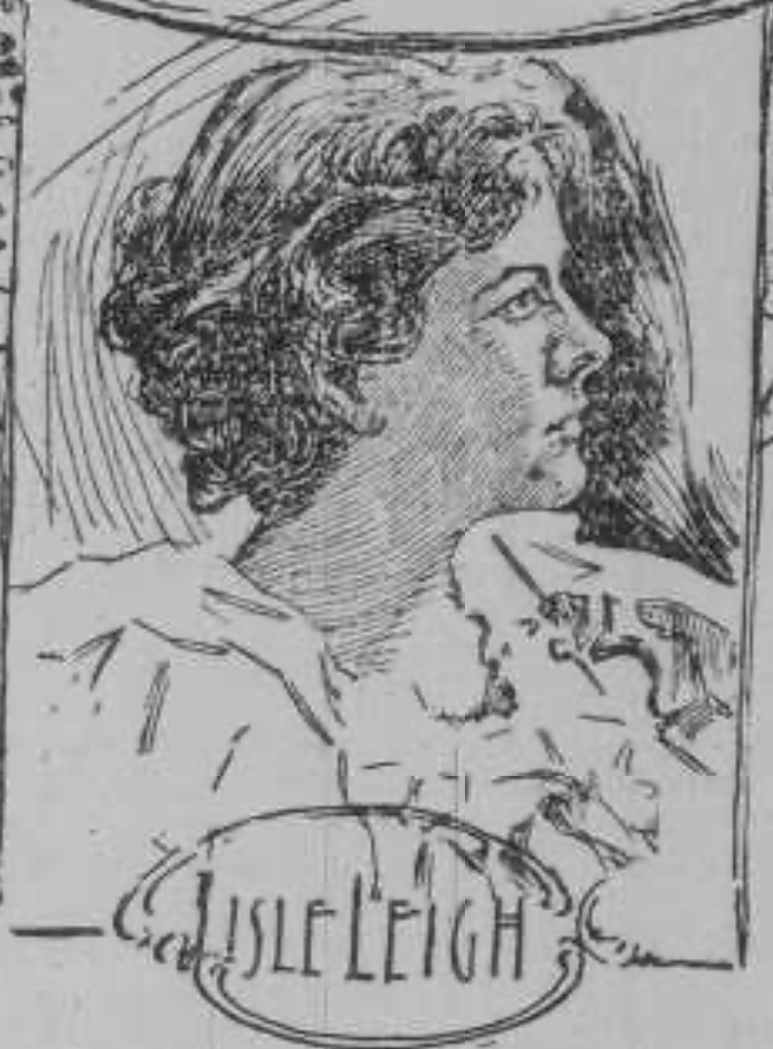
An 1895 sketch of the actress

Lisle Leigh Fitzgerald (July 4, 1869 – May 19, 1927) was an actress in the United States who had theatrical and film roles. She had numerous theatrical roles.

Leigh was born in 1869 in Utah to a Latter Day Saint (Mormon) family. Her mother died when she was young and she was raised by her performer aunt Sara Alexander. She began performing as a child in 1874. She was a performer with the Edward Albee Stock Company.

The California Photo Engraving Co. produced an image of her. She died of heart disease on May 19, 1927.

== Filmography ==
- Caprice of the Mountains (1916) as Maria Baker
- The Forbidden Path (1918) as Mrs. Byrne
- The American Way (1919)
- The Custard Cup (1923) as Mrs. Percy
