= The Red Dance =

1928 film by Raoul Walsh

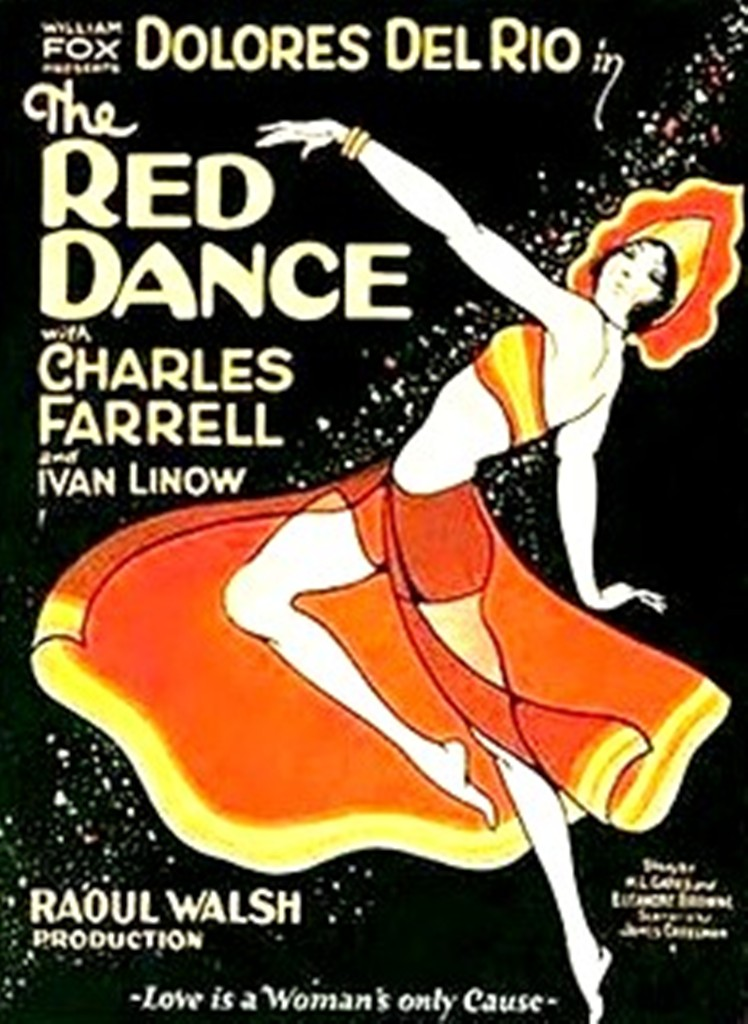
- Theatrical poster
- Directed by: Raoul Walsh
- Written by: Malcolm Stuart Boylan; Eleanor Browne
- Based on: The Red Dancer of Moscow by Henry Leyford Gates
- Starring: Dolores del Río; Charles Farrell; Ivan Linow
- Cinematography: Charles G. Clarke; Jack A. Marta
- Edited by: Louis R. Loeffler
- Music by: Ernö Rapée; S.L. Rothafel
- Distributed by: Fox Film Corporation
- Release date: June 25, 1928
- Running time: 103 minutes
- Country: United States
- Languages: Sound (Synchronized) (English intertitles)
- Box office: $1.3 million

The Red Dance (also known as The Red Dancer of Moscow) is a 1928 American synchronized sound film directed by Raoul Walsh and starring Dolores del Río and Charles Farrell that was inspired by the novel by Henry Leyford Gates. While the film has no audible dialog, it was released with a synchronized musical score with sound effects using the sound-on-film movietone process.

== Plot ==
The Red Dance (1928)

In the years leading up to the Russian Revolution, Tasia, a young peasant schoolteacher, lives in a rural village oppressed by the cruelty of the Cossacks. Her mother is killed during one of their raids, and her father is sent to prison. Filled with bitterness and a desire for revenge, Tasia’s life is upended when the towering peasant-soldier Ivan Petroff pays her relatives for her hand in marriage. On their wedding night, Petroff’s heavy drinking causes him to pass out before the ceremony can be consummated, and Tasia escapes his grasp.

Meanwhile, in the imperial capital, Grand Duke Eugene has become entangled in court intrigue. Co-conspirators with the Czarina, fearing Eugene knows too much about their political dealings, send him away to a provincial post. There, fate places him in Tasia’s path. Unaware of his royal identity, she is struck by his kindness and begins to feel the stirrings of love.

Court orders soon summon Eugene back to the capital, where he is commanded to marry Princess Varvara to secure a political alliance. Revolutionary agitators, led by an unnamed firebrand, decide this is their moment to strike. They convince Tasia—still not realizing Eugene is the intended bridegroom—that she must assassinate the man to aid the cause.

On the wedding day, Tasia takes aim but at the last moment recognizes Eugene and deliberately misses. She flees before she can be apprehended. With the Revolution breaking out across Russia, Petroff—no longer a simple peasant—rises to the rank of general in the new Red regime. Tasia becomes celebrated as “The Red Dancer of Moscow,” a revolutionary heroine whose performances are staged in theaters where conspirators plot in the shadows beneath the boards.

The new order soon turns on Eugene. Powerful General Tanaroff, a suave but dangerous political climber, orders his arrest as a counter-revolutionary. When Tasia learns of this, she seeks out Petroff and pleads for his help, confessing her love for the Grand Duke. Though Petroff is deeply in love with Tasia himself, he is moved by her distress and agrees to intervene.

Petroff is assigned to execute Eugene, but when the moment comes he fires a blank cartridge, staging the Duke’s “death” for the benefit of the revolutionary authorities. Eugene is buried with full ceremony, then quietly exhumed by Petroff, who hides him from Tanaroff’s agents. Finally, Petroff arranges for an airplane to carry Eugene and Tasia out of Russia, sacrificing his own happiness so that the woman he loves may find freedom with the man she has chosen.

== Cast ==
- Dolores del Río as Tasia
- Charles Farrell as Grand Duke Eugene
- Ivan Linow as Ivan Petroff
- Boris Charsky as An agitator
- Dorothy Revier as Princess Varvara
- Andrés de Segurola as General Tanaroff
- Demetrius Alexis as Rasputin
- Henry Armetta as Prisoner (uncredited)
- Nigel De Brulier as Bishop (uncredited)
- Soledad Jiménez as Tasia's Mother (uncredited)
- Muriel McCormac as Tasia as a child (uncredited)
- Barry Norton as Rasputin's Assassin (uncredited)
- Magda Sonja as Undetermined Role (uncredited)

== Music ==
The film featured a theme song entitled "Someday, Somewhere (We'll Meet Again)" which was composed by Erno Rapee and Lew Pollack.

== Critical reception ==
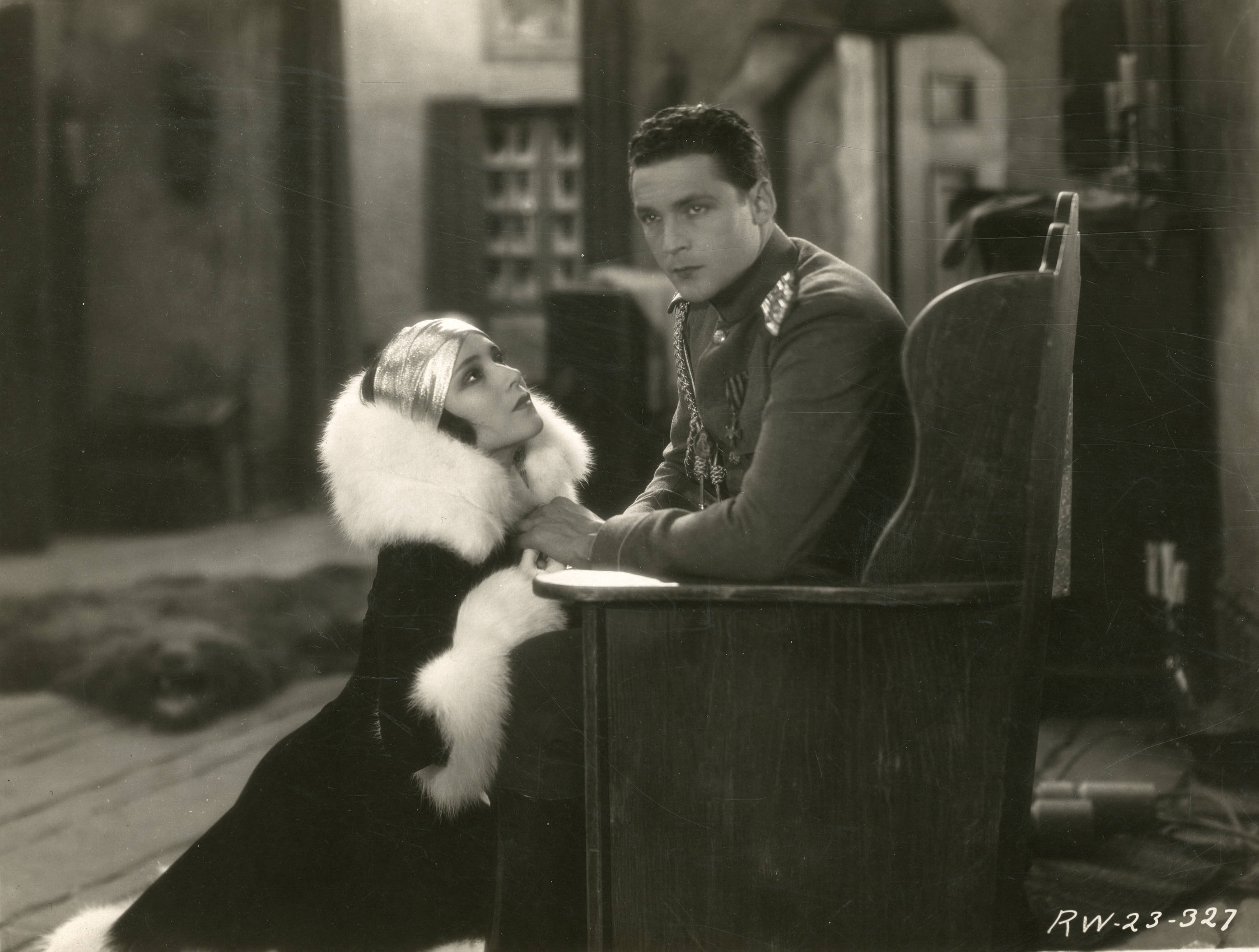
del Rio and Farrell in a publicity image

"There is a good deal of lethargy about the opening chapters of this offering, but interest picks up in the latter passages", wrote Mordaunt Hall of The New York Times. "There are some good scenes in this somewhat wild piece of work, but it is often incoherent." Variety singled out Ivan Linow's performance for praise and reported that the scenes of the uprising were successful, but "otherwise there wasn't much to direct in this story except to keep it going." Oliver Claxton of The New Yorker panned the film, writing, "how anybody with the slightest modicum of intelligence could fashion such a tale is beyond me....a little criticism would shoot the film so full of holes that it would resemble a Swiss cheese without the cheese. The odor, I am afraid, would still remain."

== See also ==
- List of early sound feature films (1926–1929)
