= A Stage Romance =

1922 film

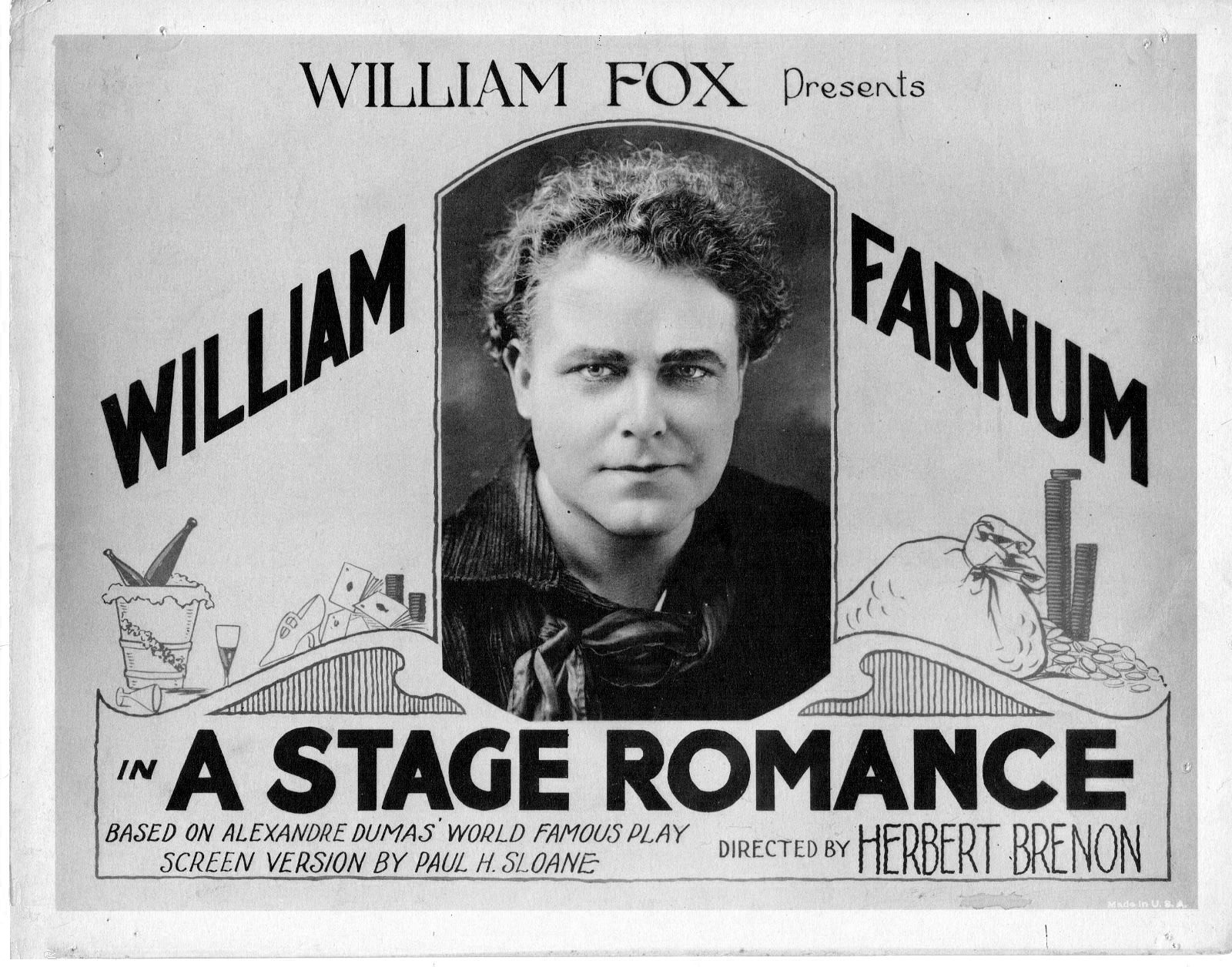
- Lobby card
- Directed by: Herbert Brenon
- Written by: Paul Sloane
- Based on: Kean by Alexandre Dumas
- Produced by: William Fox
- Starring: William Farnum; Peggy Shaw; Holmes Herbert
- Cinematography: Tom Malloy
- Production company: Fox Film Corporation
- Distributed by: Fox Film Corporation
- Release date: March 5, 1922
- Running time: 70 minutes
- Country: United States
- Language: Silent (English intertitles)

A Stage Romance is a 1922 American silent historical drama film directed by Herbert Brenon and starring William Farnum, Peggy Shaw, and Holmes Herbert.

It is an adaptation of the play Kean by Alexandre Dumas about the adventures of the British actor Edmund Kean.

== Plot ==
As described in a film magazine, Edmund Kean (Farnum), at the height of his popularity in London, has as his inspiration the Countess Koefeld (Bonillas). Among his devoted followers is Anna Damby (Shaw), whose guardian is attempting to force her into marriage with the roue Lord Melville (Carillo). Anna goes to Edmund for advice, and Melville's spy Needles (Boring) reports at a reception, given at the Koefeld home where the Prince of Wales (Herbert) is a guest, that Edmund has eloped with Anna. Edmund arrives shortly and refutes the rumor, and hands a note to Countess Koefeld asking her to come to his dressing room. Edmund advises Anna to forget her stage ambitions. He then announces a benefit performance for a crippled child. Meanwhile, Melville lures Anna to an inn with a decoy note that has Edmund's name, intending to kidnap her. Edmund, who was entertaining at the inn, thrashes the gang of kidnappers. On the night of the benefit the Countess goes to the Kean dressing room and makes violent love to him. Her husband the Count (McAllister) and the Prince of Wales later arrive, and the Count picks up a fan that his wife had left behind in the dressing room. Edmund, believing that the Prince is a rival for the affections of the Countess, begs him not to appear in the Koefeld box after the performance begins, but the Prince refuses. Edmund discovers that the fan is missing and, angered, refuses to go on. However, when Little Emily (Goodwin) hobbles in, he relents. Edmund sees the Prince in the Koefeld box and a fit of madness seizes him. He denounces the Prince from the stage and is carried fainting to his dressing room, his career apparently ended. Edmund tells Anna that his madness was feigned. Melville sends the police to arrest Edmund. The Prince and Count Koefeld arrive and the Prince, shielding Edmund, explains that he had borrowed the fan from the Countess. The Count apologizes to the actor. Dismissing the police, the Prince tells Edmund that he had better leave England. He and Anna are married and go to America.

== Cast ==
- William Farnum as Edmund Kean
- Peggy Shaw as Anna Damby
- Holmes Herbert as Prince of Wales
- Mario Carillo as Lord Melville
- America Chedister as Lady Anne Boyle
- Paul McAllister as Count Koefeld
- Etienne Girardot as Salomon
- Bernard Siegel as Mr. Sleeker
- Hal De Forrest as Old Bob
- Myrta Bonillas as Countess Koefield

== Bibliography ==
- Krefft, Vanda. The Man Who Made the Movies: The Meteoric Rise and Tragic Fall of William Fox. HarperCollins, 2017.
- Aubrey Solomon. The Fox Film Corporation, 1915–1935: A History and Filmography. McFarland, 2011.
