= Who Are My Parents? =

1922 film

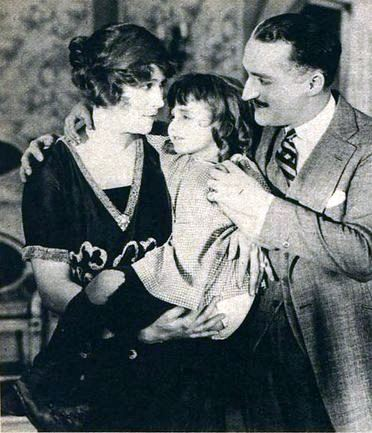
- Still of the scene in Who Are My Parents? with L. Rogers Lytton and Peggy Shaw
- Directed by: J. Searle Dawley
- Written by: Paul Sloane
- Story by: Julien Josephson
- Starring: L. Rogers Lytton; Peggy Shaw; Florence Billings; Ernest Hilliard; Robert Agnew
- Cinematography: Joseph Ruttenberg
- Production company: Fox Film Corporation
- Distributed by: Fox Film Corporation
- Release date: November 26, 1922
- Running time: 9 reels
- Country: United States
- Languages: Silent film (English intertitles)

Who Are My Parents? (also known as A Little Child Shall Lead Them) is a 1922 American silent drama film directed by J. Searle Dawley and starring L. Rogers Lytton, Peggy Shaw, Florence Billings, Ernest Hilliard, and Robert Agnew. The film was released by Fox Film Corporation on November 26, 1922.

== Cast ==
- L. Rogers Lytton as Colonel Lewis (as Roger Lytton)
- Peggy Shaw as Betty Lewis
- Florence Billings as Barbara Draper
- Ernest Hilliard as Frank Draper
- Robert Agnew as Bob Hale
- Adelaide Prince as Mrs. Tyler
- Niles Welch as Ken (her son)
- Marie Reichardt as Hannah
- Florence Haas as Orphan
- Jimmie Lapsley as Orphan
- Leonard Rosenfeld as Lazy Bill

== Preservation ==
In February 2021, Who Are My Parents? was cited by the National Film Preservation Board on their Lost U.S. Silent Feature Films list and is therefore presumed lost.

== See also ==
- List of lost films
- 1937 Fox vault fire
