= The Blue Danube (1928 film) =

1928 film

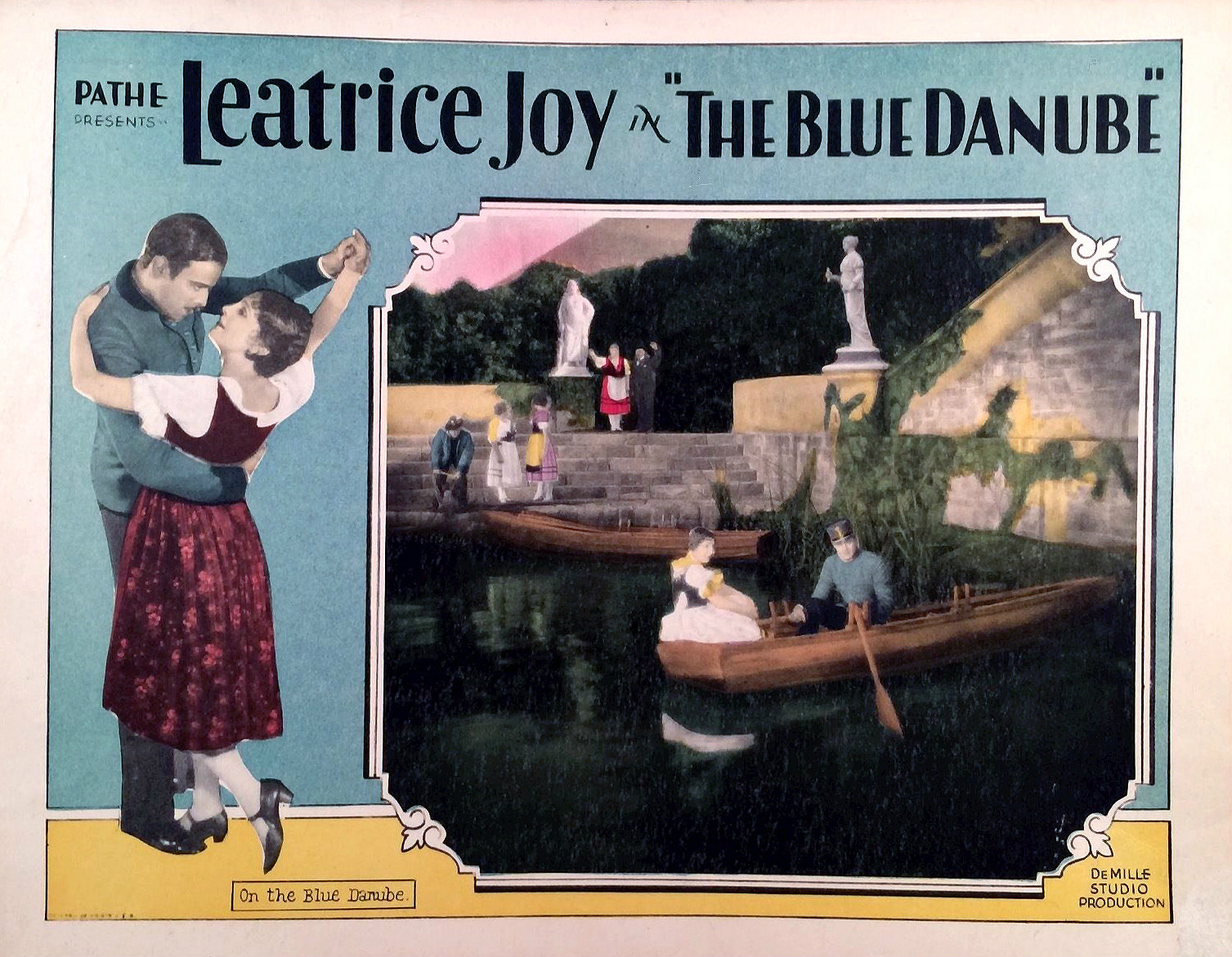
- Lobby card
- Directed by: Paul Sloane
- Written by: Harry Carr (writer); Paul Sloane (writer); John W. Krafft (titles); Edwin Justus Mayer (titles)
- Story by: John Farrow
- Produced by: Cecil B. DeMille; Ralph Block
- Starring: Leatrice Joy; Joseph Schildkraut
- Cinematography: Arthur C. Miller
- Edited by: Margaret Darrell
- Distributed by: Pathé Exchange
- Release date: March 11, 1928
- Running time: 7 reels
- Country: United States
- Languages: Silent Version; Sound Version (English Intertitles)

The Blue Danube is a 1928 American silent romantic drama film starring Leatrice Joy. Due to the public apathy towards silent films, a sound version was also prepared. While the sound version has no audible dialog, it was released with a synchronized musical score with sound effects using both the sound-on-disc and sound-on-film process. This picture was produced by Cecil B. DeMille and directed by Paul Sloane with a distribution through Pathé Exchange.

== Plot ==
A romance set in Austria before, during, and after World War I.

== Cast ==
- Leatrice Joy as Marguerite
- Joseph Schildkraut as Ludwig
- Nils Asther as Erich von Statzen
- Seena Owen as Helena Boursch
- Albert Gran as Herr Bourscch
- Frank Reicher as Baron
- May Robson
- Edna Mae Cooper
- Oliver Eckhardt as Fritz

== Music ==
The sound version featured a theme song entitled “Moonlight on the Danube” which was composed by Byron Gay.

== Preservation ==
A print of The Blue Danube is preserved at the Library of Congress, Archives Du Film Du CNC(Bois d'Arcy), BFI National Film And Television Archive.
