= Myrta Bonillas =

American actress (1890-1959)

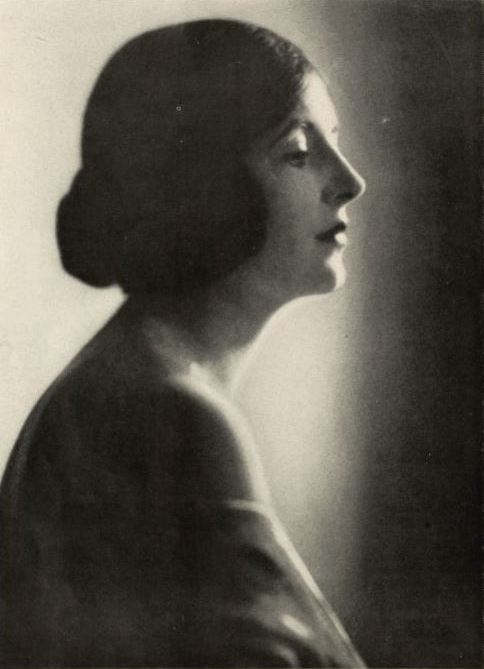
- Born: November 3, 1890
- Died: November 13, 1959 (aged 69)

Myrta Bonillas (November 3, 1890 – November 13, 1959) was an American actress of the silent film era known for her roles in films such as Shackles of Gold (1922), The Custard Cup (1923), The Claw (1927) and Lummox (1930).

== Career ==
Bonillas reportedly worked as an extra for Fox Film Corporation for only one day in 1922 before her beauty inspired director Herbert Brenon to offer her the role of Countess Koefield in his film A Stage Romance, which starred William Farnum. Some sources also report that she was discovered by actor Christy Cabanne. The same year, Bonillas in another film by Brenon, Shackles of Gold (1922), this time as Farnum's love interest. Bonillas collaborated with Brenon on several other films during her career, including The Custard Cup (1923) and Lummox (1930).

Bonillas married in 1924, and stopped acting until 1927. After 1930, she appeared primarily in uncredited roles, with the exception of 1939's Así es la vida (Such is Life), an Argentinian film directed by Francisco Múgica.

Filmography
Title	Role	Year
Así es la vida (Such is Life)	Margarita	1939
A Damsel in Distress	uncredited	1937
Charlie Chan at the Opera	Villager in Opera (uncredited)	1936
Ramona	uncredited	1936
One Night of Love	uncredited	1934
Running with Charles Paddock (short film)		1932
Lummox	Veronica Neidringhouse	1930
American Beauty		1927
The Claw	Saba Rockwood	1927
The Gingham Girl	Sonia Mason	1927
The Custard Cup	Gussie Bosley	1923
Shackles of Gold	Marie Van Dusen	1922
A Stage Romance	Countess Koefield	1922

== Private life ==
Bonillas married army captain John S. Peters on December 13, 1924. In the fall of 1928, Bonillas filed for divorce from Peters, citing mental anguish caused by Peters' physical abuse of a friend of hers.
