= His Dog =

1927 film by Karl Brown

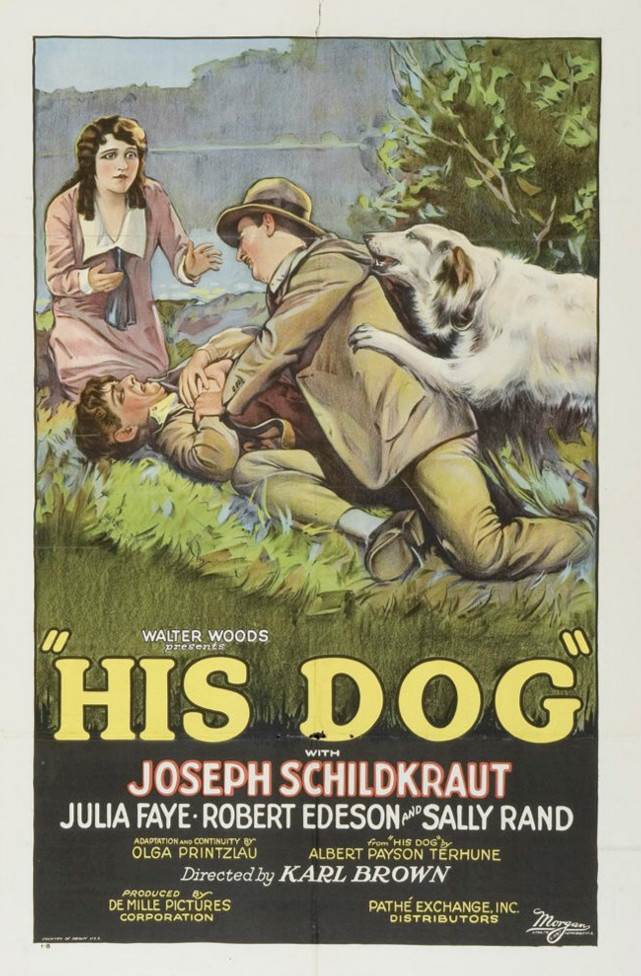
- Film poster
- Directed by: Karl Brown
- Screenplay by: Olga Printzlau; John W. Krafft (titles)
- Based on: His Dog by Albert Payson Terhune
- Starring: Joseph Schildkraut; Julia Faye
- Cinematography: Fred Westerberg
- Edited by: Margaret Darrell
- Production company: DeMille Pictures Corporation
- Distributed by: Pathé Exchange
- Release date: July 25, 1927 (United States)
- Running time: 70 minutes
- Country: United States
- Language: Silent (English intertitles)

His Dog is a 1927 American silent drama film directed by Karl Brown for DeMille Pictures Corporation. It stars Joseph Schildkraut and Julia Faye in one of her rare leading roles. A complete print of the film exists at the Cinematheque Royale de Belgique in Brussels, Belgium.

== Cast ==
- Joseph Schildkraut as Peter Olsen
- Julia Faye as Dorcas
- Crauford Kent as Mr. Gault
- Sally Rand as Marian Gault
- Robert Edeson as Colonel Marsden
- Annabelle Magnus as Olive
- Fred Walton as Chatham
