= The Grail (film) =

1923 film

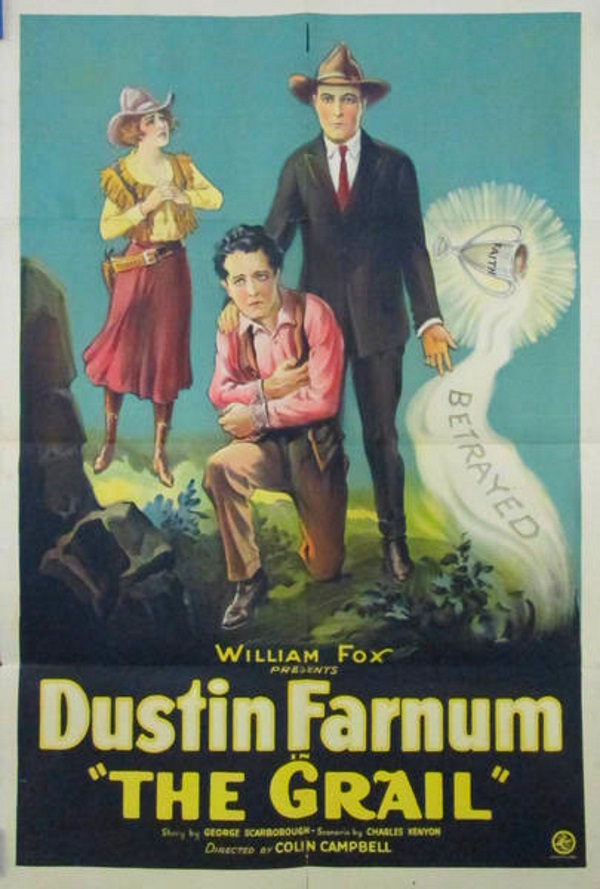
- Theatrical release poster
- Directed by: Colin Campbell
- Screenplay by: Charles Kenyon
- Based on: The Grail by George Scarborough
- Starring: Dustin Farnum; Peggy Shaw; Carl Stockdale; Frances Raymond; James Gordon; Jack Rollens
- Cinematography: Joseph Brotherton
- Production company: Fox Film Corporation
- Distributed by: Fox Film Corporation
- Release date: October 14, 1923
- Running time: 50 minutes
- Country: United States
- Languages: Silent; English intertitles

The Grail is a 1923 American silent Western film directed by Colin Campbell and written by Charles Kenyon. The film stars Dustin Farnum, Peggy Shaw, Carl Stockdale, Frances Raymond, James Gordon and Jack Rollens. The film was released on October 14, 1923, by Fox Film Corporation.

== Cast ==
- Dustin Farnum as Chic Shelby
- Peggy Shaw as Dora Bledsoe
- Carl Stockdale as Reverend Bledsoe
- Frances Raymond as Mrs. Bledsoe
- James Gordon as James Trammel
- Jack Rollens as John Trammel
- Frances Hatton as Mrs. Trammel
- Alma Bennett as Susie Trammel
- Léon Bary as Sam Hervey

== Preservation ==
With no prints of The Grail located in any film archives, it is considered a lost film.
