= Peggy Shaw (silent film actress) =

American silent film actress

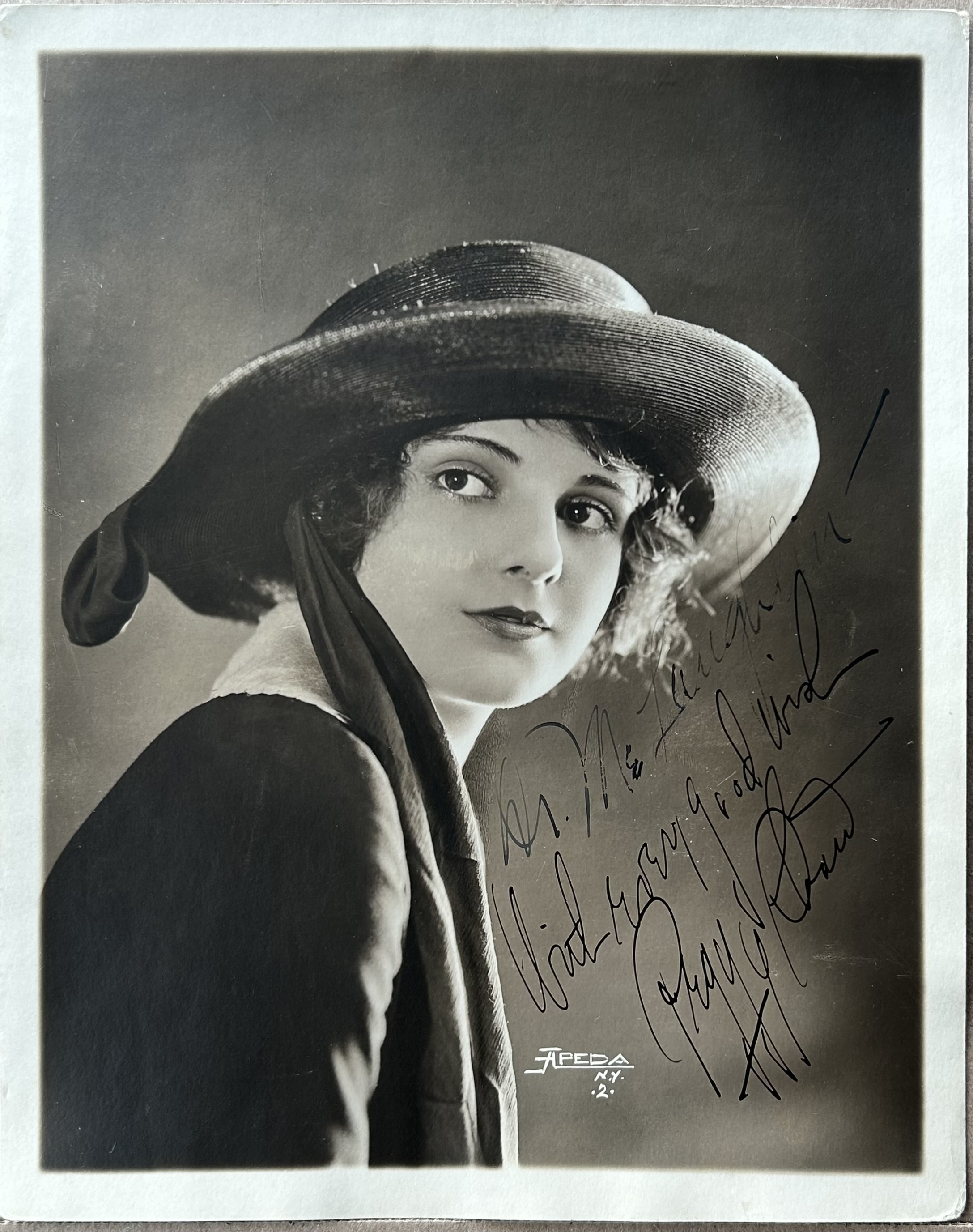
- Peggy Shaw Inscribed Photo
- Born: August 31, 1905; Pittsburgh, Pennsylvania
- Died: November 1990 (aged 85); United States
- Occupation: Actress
- Years active: 1920 - 1928 (film)

Peggy Shaw (1905–1990) was an American film actress of the silent era. Prior to her film career she had appeared in the shows of Florenz Ziegfeld.

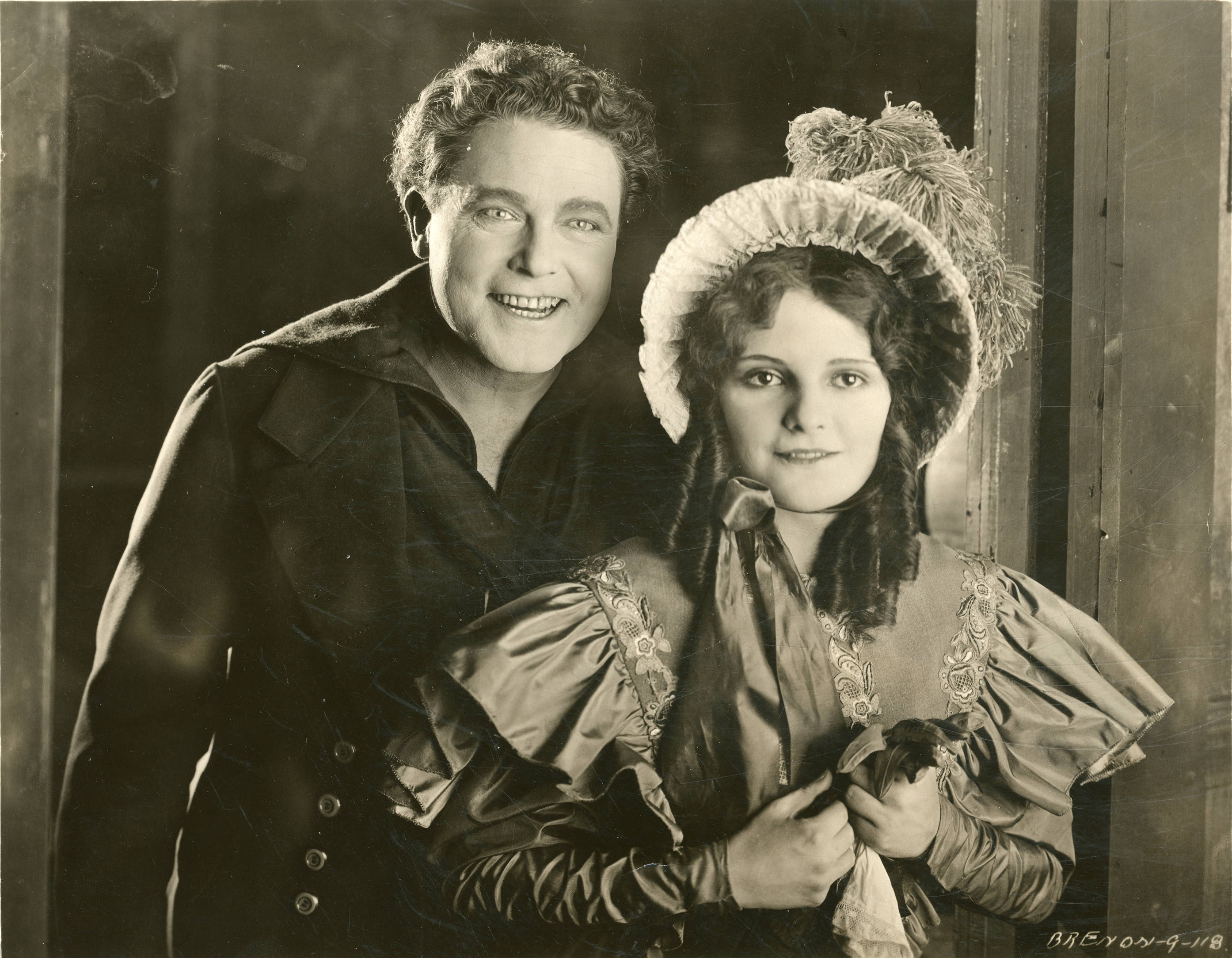
With William Farnum in A Stage Romance

== Selected filmography ==
- A Stage Romance (1922)
- Who Are My Parents? (1922)
- My Friend the Devil (1922)
- The Custard Cup (1923)
- Skid Proof (1923)
- Does It Pay? (1923)
- The Grail (1923)
- The Plunderer (1924)
- In Hollywood with Potash and Perlmutter (1924)
- Winner Take All (1924)
- Gold Heels (1924)
- The Fighting Demon (1925)
- Subway Sadie (1926)
- Hoof Marks (1927)
- His Rise to Fame (1927)
- The Little Buckaroo (1928)
- The Ballyhoo Buster (1928)

== Bibliography ==
- Solomon, Aubrey. The Fox Film Corporation, 1915-1935: A History and Filmography. McFarland, 2011.
