= The Custard Cup =

1923 film directed by Herbert Brenon

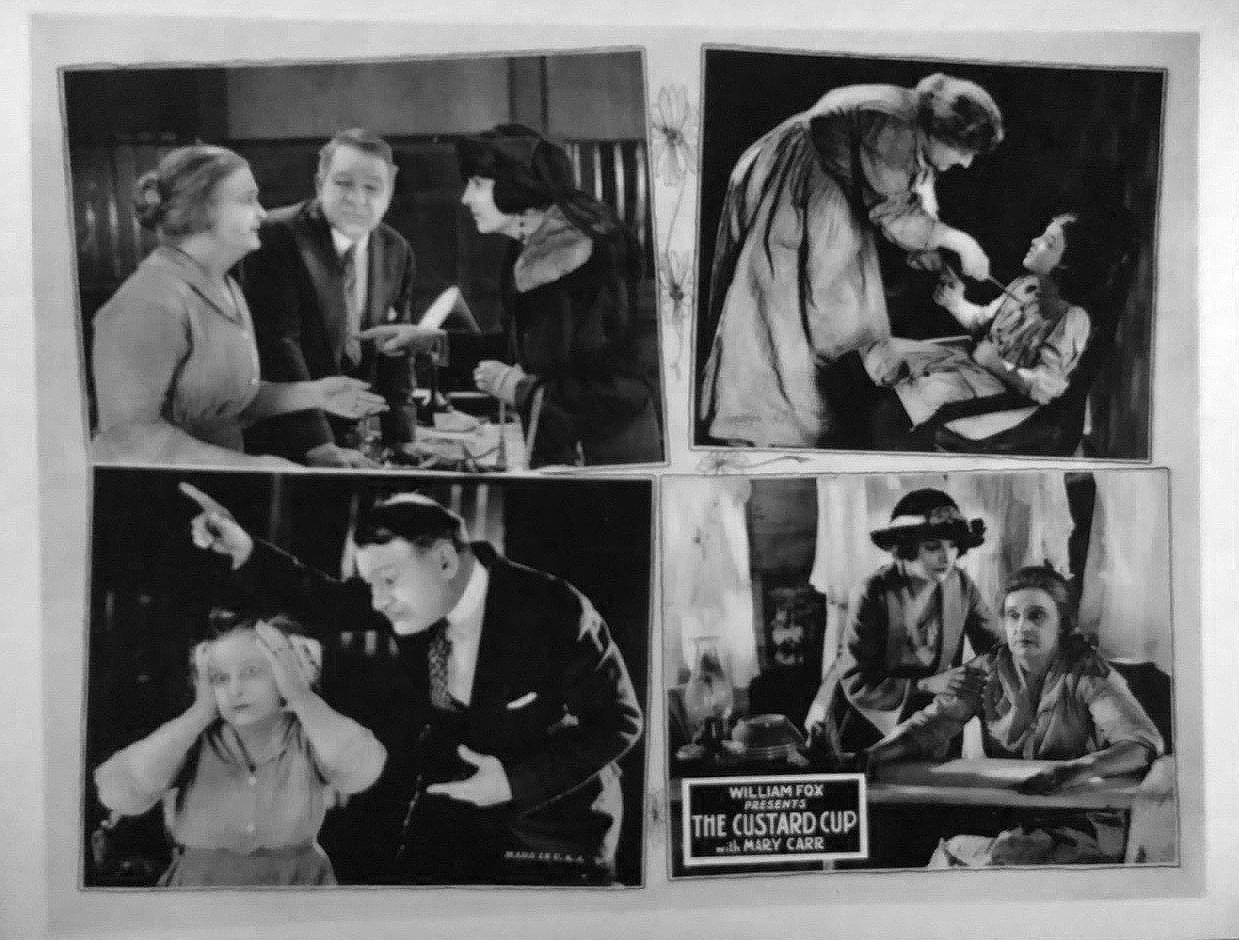
- Lobby card
- Directed by: Herbert Brenon
- Screenplay by: G. Marion Burton; Ralph Spence
- Based on: The Custard Cup by Florence Bingham Livingston
- Starring: Mary Carr; Myrta Bonillas; Miriam Battista; Jerry Devine; Ernest McKay; Peggy Shaw
- Cinematography: Tom Malloy
- Production company: Fox Film Corporation
- Distributed by: Fox Film Corporation
- Release date: January 1, 1923
- Running time: 70 minutes
- Country: United States
- Language: Silent (English intertitles)

The Custard Cup is a 1923 American drama film directed by Herbert Brenon and written by G. Marion Burton and Ralph Spence. It is based on the 1921 novel The Custard Cup by Florence Bingham Livingston. The film stars Mary Carr, Myrta Bonillas, Miriam Battista, Jerry Devine, Ernest McKay, and Peggy Shaw. The film was released on January 1, 1923, by Fox Film Corporation.

== Plot ==
As described in a film magazine, Mrs. Penfield, or Penzie, known for her goodness, lives in a little group settlement with her two adopted children. Crink, the eldest boy, finds little waif Lettie, who joins the family. Through Penzie's care the girl improves. Also in the neighborhood are the mysterious couple Frank and Gussie Bosley who are counterfeiters. During a boat excursion sponsored by Alderman Curry, Frank is discovered passing off his false notes and Gussie gives Penzie a large bill to buy refreshments for the children but to return the change to her. Frank tries to destroy the evidence and burns the remaining bills in his pockets. Through his carelessness, the boat catches fire, forcing all on board to flee. Later, as the law enforcement net begins to close on them, the Bosleys prepare to leave but are apprehended by Secret Service men. Penzie, who has been falsely accused of passing false money, is exonerated.

== Cast ==
- Mary Carr as Mrs. Penfield
- Myrta Bonillas as Gussie Bosley
- Miriam Battista as Lettie
- Jerry Devine as Crink
- Ernest McKay as Thad
- Peggy Shaw as Lorene Percy
- Lisle Leigh as Mrs. Percy
- Fred Esmelton as Jeremiah Winston
- Henry Sedley as Frank Bosley
- Louis Hendricks as Alderman Curry
- Edward Boring as Mr. Wopple
- Emily Lorraine as Perennial Prue
- Ben Lyon as Dick Chase
- Richard Collins as Counterfeiter
- Nick Hollen as Detective

== Preservation ==
With no copies located in film archives, The Custard Cup is a lost film.
