= Winner Take All (1924 film) =

1924 film

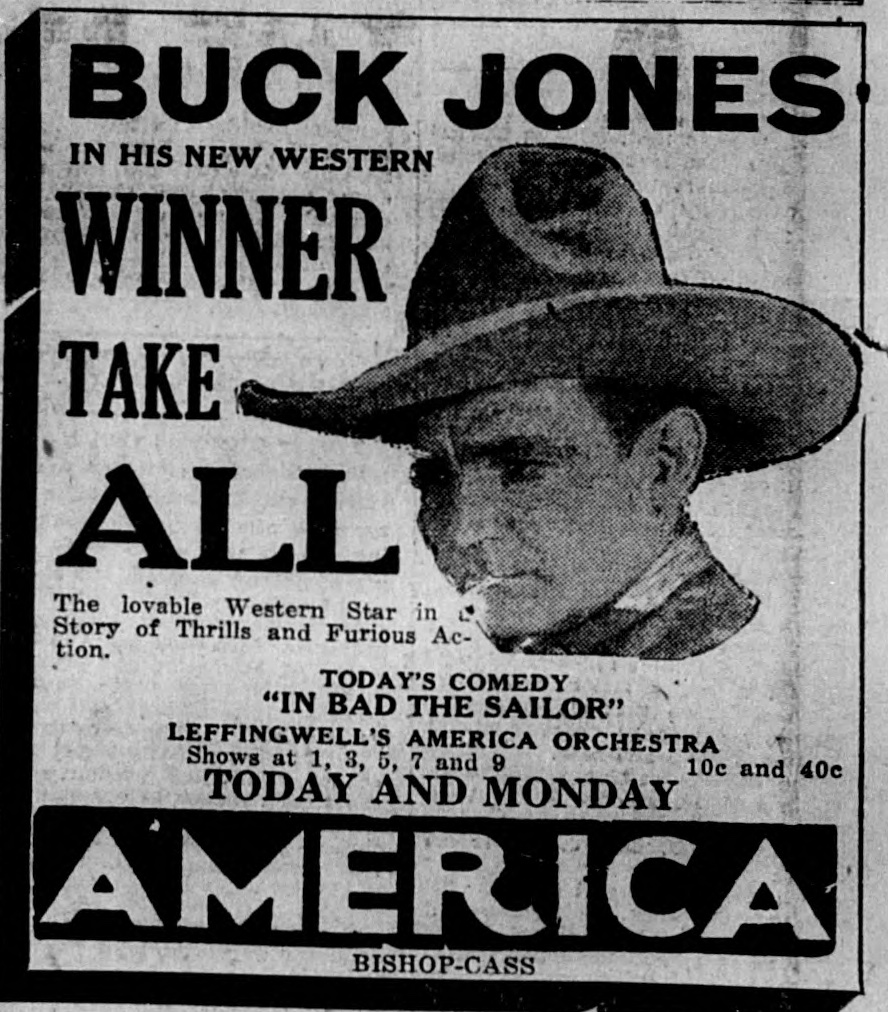
- Contemporary advertisement
- Directed by: W. S. Van Dyke
- Written by: Ewart Adamson
- Based on: Winner Take All; 1920 novel by Larry Evans
- Produced by: William Fox
- Starring: Buck Jones; Peggy Shaw
- Cinematography: Joseph Brotherton; E. D. Van Dyke
- Distributed by: Fox Film Corporation
- Release date: October 12, 1924
- Running time: 60 mins.
- Country: United States
- Languages: Silent; English intertitles

Winner Take All is a lost 1924 American silent Western film directed by W. S. Van Dyke with Buck Jones as star. It was produced and released by the Fox Film Corporation.

== Plot summary ==
Perry Blair loses his job after fighting with his foreman and is recruited by boxing promoter Charles Dunham, who takes him east to pursue a career in the ring. In New York, Perry meets Cecil Manners and becomes a successful boxer. He later leaves Dunham and returns home after being pressured to participate in a fixed fight. Dunham eventually persuades Perry to fight again in a winner-take-all bout. Perry wins the match, changing Cecil's opinion of him after she had believed him to be a coward.

== Cast ==
- Buck Jones - Perry Blair
- Peggy Shaw - Cecil Manners
- Edward Hearn - Jack Hamilton
- Lilyan Tashman - Felicity Brown
- William Bailey - Jim Devereaux
- Ben Deeley - Charles Dunham
- Tom O'Brien - Dynamite Galloway
