= Turkish Delight (1927 film) =

1927 film

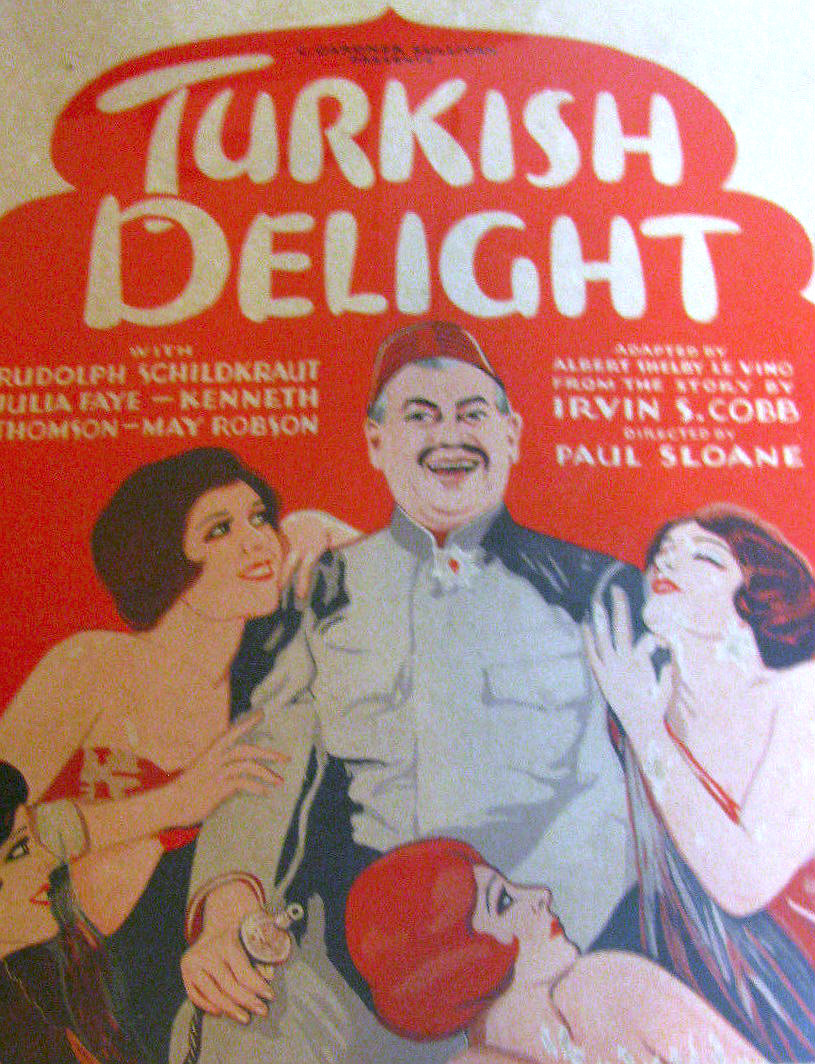
- Film poster
- Directed by: Paul Sloane
- Screenplay by: Tay Garnett
- Story by: Irvin S. Cobb
- Starring: Julia Faye; Rudolph Schildkraut
- Cinematography: Jacob A. Badaracco
- Edited by: Margaret Darrell
- Production company: DeMille Pictures Corporation
- Distributed by: Producers Distributing Corporation
- Release date: November 11, 1927 (United States)
- Running time: 60 minutes
- Country: United States
- Language: Silent (English intertitles)

Turkish Delight is a 1927 American silent comedy film directed by Paul Sloane for DeMille Pictures Corporation. It stars Julia Faye, in her first top-billed performance, and Rudolph Schildkraut.

== Cast ==
- Julia Faye as Zelma
- Rudolph Schildkraut as Abdul Hassan
- Kenneth Thomson as Donald Sims
- Louis Natheaux as Achmet Ali
- May Robson as Tsakran
- Harry Allen as Scotty
- Toby Claude as Nassarah

== Preservation ==
A complete 16 mm print of the film exists at the UCLA Film & Television Archive.

=== Stills ===
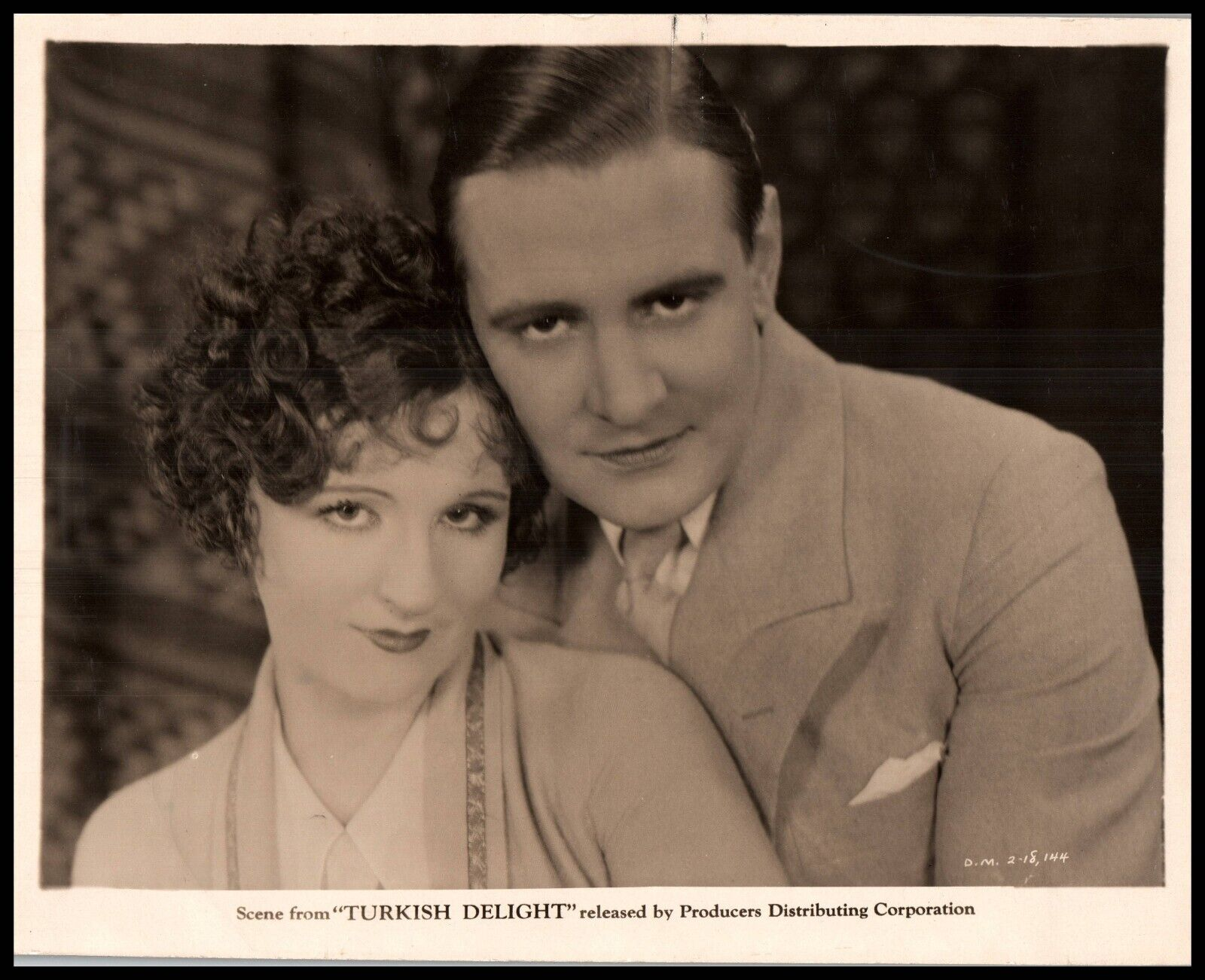

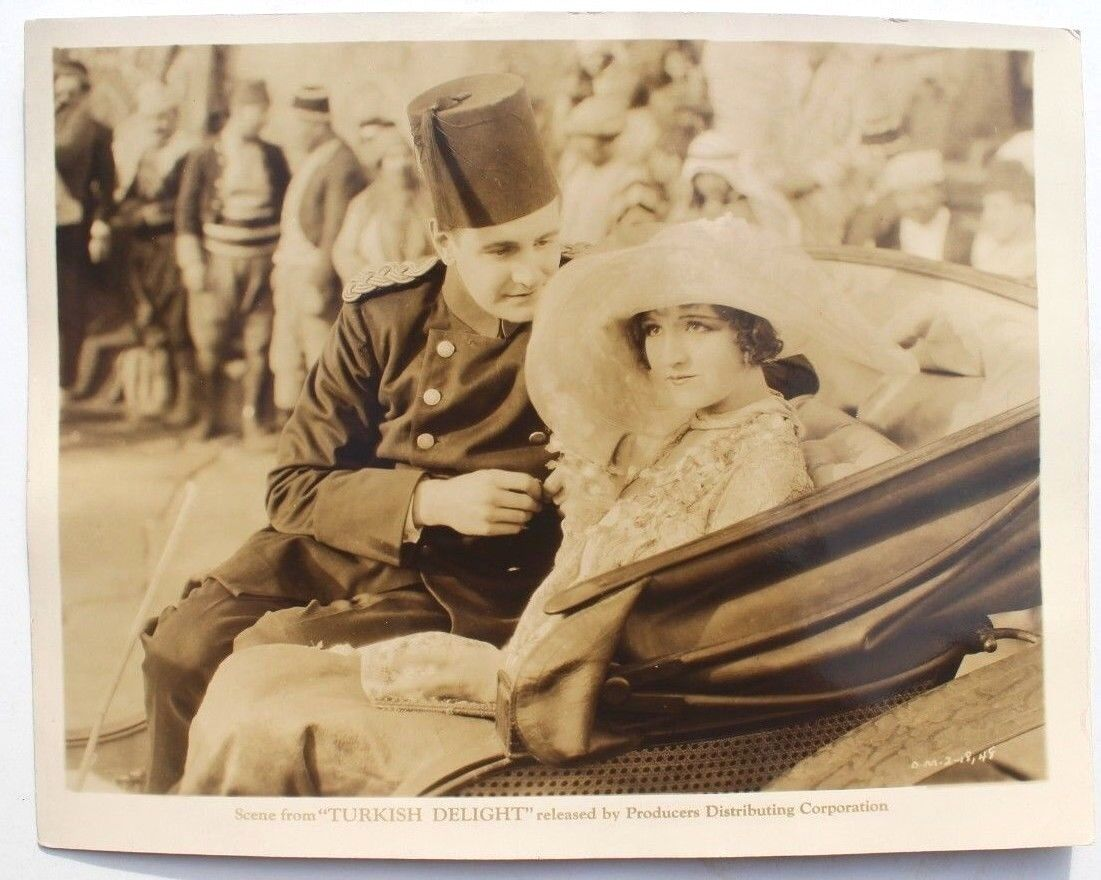
