= Margaret Darrell =

American film editor

- Born: Marguerite W. Dreypolcher; February 11, 1891; San Francisco, California, USA
- Died: April 7, 1984 (aged 93); Alameda, California, USA
- Occupation: Film editor
- Years active: 1927–1928
- Spouse: Cassius J. Darrell

Margaret Darrell (born Marguerite Dreypolcher) was an American film editor active during the late 1920s at DeMille Pictures.

== Biography ==
Margaret Darrell was the daughter of William S. Dreypolcher of San Francisco, California. Her father was the longtime business manager of The San Francisco Examiner. She was married to Universal Pictures production and location manager C.J. Darrell; the pair retired from the film industry and became prospectors and ranchers in the 1930s before moving to San Francisco, according to census records.

== Select filmography ==
- The Blue Danube (1928)
- Turkish Delight (1927)
- His Dog (1927)
