= Adelaide Prince =

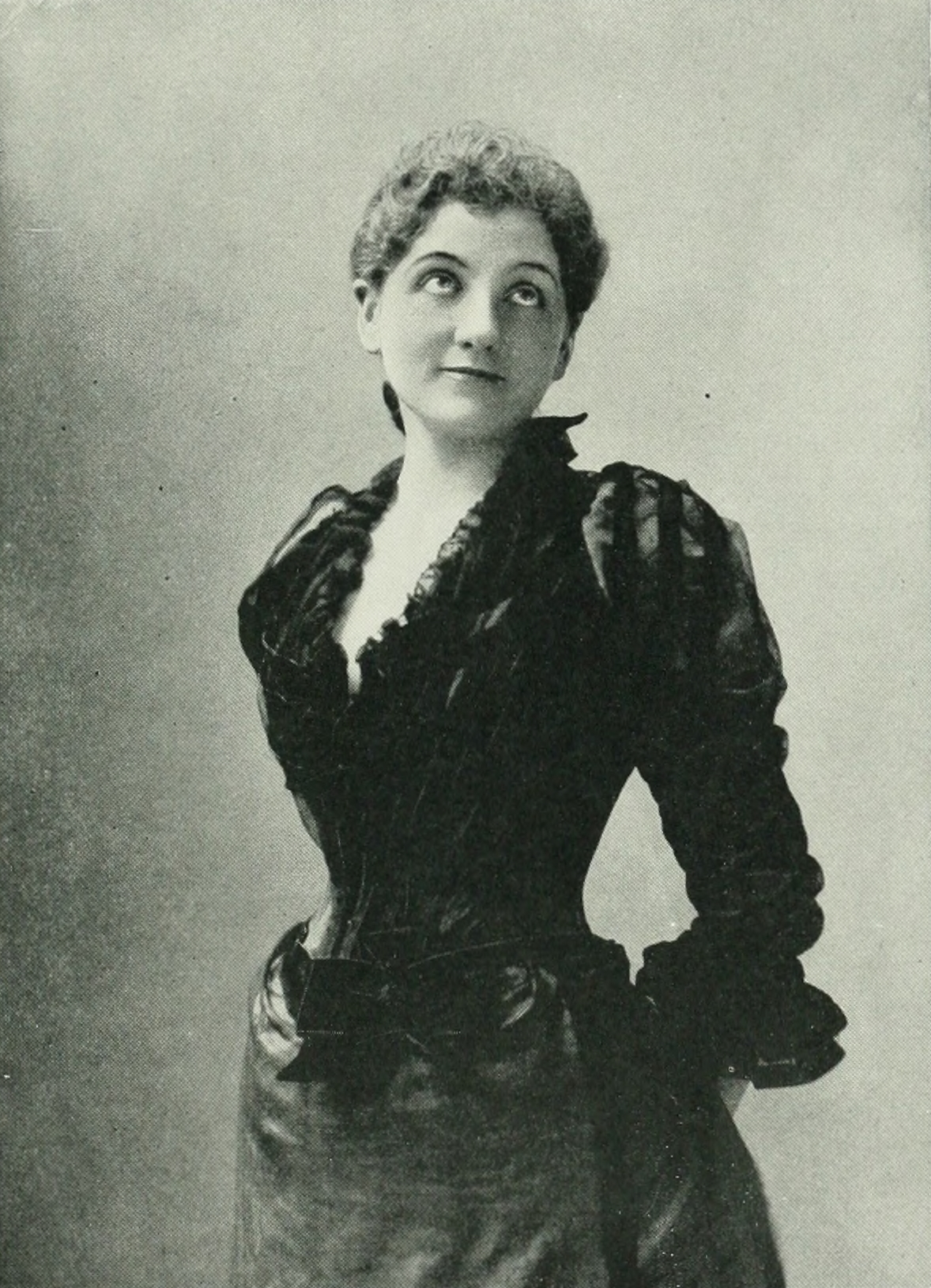
Adelaide Prince

Adelaide Prince (born Adelaide Rubinstein, 14 December 1866 – 4 April 1941) was an English-born American actress.

== Life and career ==
Adelaide Prince was born Adelaide Rubinstein in London, England on 14 December 1866. Her family was Jewish. and they immigrated to the United States when Adelaide was an infant; settling first in Millican, Texas and later in Galveston, Texas. She began performing in vaudeville and pantomime as a child and while a teenager married Henry D. Prince. She later married Edwin Booth's nephew, the actor Creston Clarke. Their son was the writer Harry Clork.

Prince had a lengthy career as an adult actress on the American stage; performing as a member of Augustin Daly's theatre troupe and in many plays produced by Charles Frohman on Broadway and on tour. She was particularly celebrated for her performances in plays by William Shakespeare. One of her Broadway performances included the role of Helen in James Sheridan Knowles's The Hunchback at the Garrick Theatre in 1902. She also performed in a handful of silent films; including National Red Cross Pageant (1917), Captain Swift (1920), and Who Are My Parents? (1922).

Prince died on 4 April 1941 in Shawnee on Delaware, Pennsylvania.
