= His Rise to Fame =

1927 film

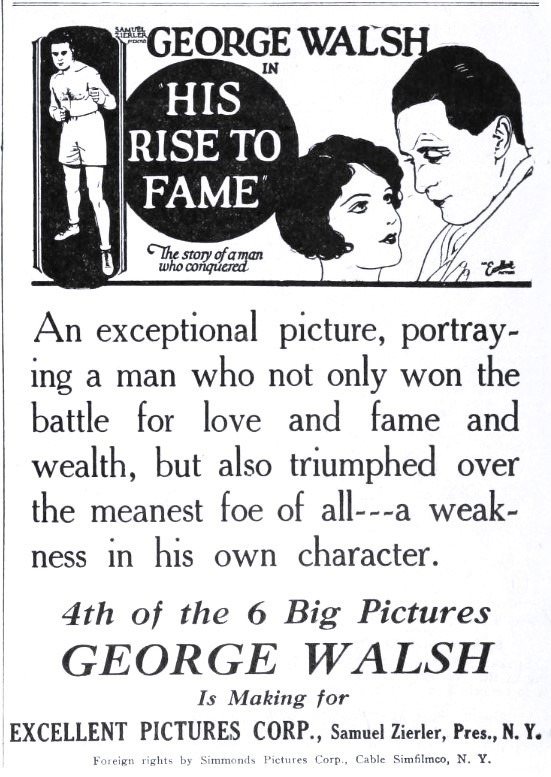
- Advertisement
- Directed by: Bernard McEveety
- Written by: Victoria Moore
- Produced by: Samuel Zierler
- Starring: George Walsh; Peggy Shaw; Bradley Barker
- Cinematography: Marcel Le Picard
- Production company: Excellent Pictures
- Distributed by: Excellent Pictures
- Release date: February 15, 1927
- Running time: 60 minutes
- Country: United States
- Language: Silent (English intertitles)

His Rise to Fame is a 1927 American silent drama film directed by Bernard McEveety and starring George Walsh, Peggy Shaw, and Bradley Barker.

== Plot ==
A drifter meets a dancer in a cabaret and reforms his life, becoming a championship-winning boxer.

== Cast ==
- George Walsh as Jerry Drake
- Peggy Shaw as Laura White
- Bradley Barker as Hubert Strief
- Mildred Reardon as Helen Lee
- Martha Petelle as 'Ma' Drake
- William Nally as Montana Mack
- Ivan Linow as Bull Vickers

== Preservation ==
With no prints of His Rise to Fame located in any film archives, it is a lost film.

== Bibliography ==
- Munden, Kenneth White. The American Film Institute Catalog of Motion Pictures Produced in the United States, Part 1. University of California Press, 1997.
