= Paul Sloane =

1893-1963 American film director and screenwriter

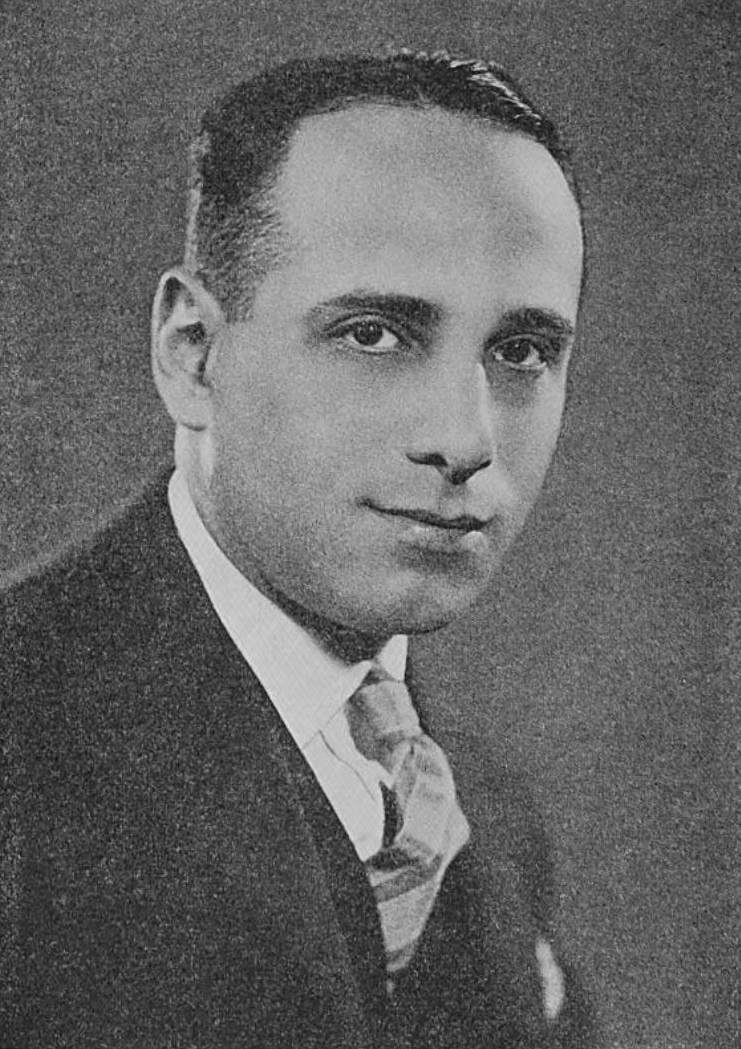
- Born: April 16, 1893; New York City, US
- Died: November 15, 1963 (aged 70); Santa Monica, California, US
- Occupations: Film director; screenwriter

Paul Sloane (April 16, 1893 – November 15, 1963) was an American screenwriter and film director.

== Biography ==
Born in New York City on April 16, 1893, Sloane directed 26 films from 1925 to 1952, and wrote or co-wrote 35 films. His movies include Hearts in Dixie (1929) with Stepin Fetchit, The Woman Accused (1933) with Cary Grant, The Texans (1938) with Joan Bennett, Randolph Scott and Walter Brennan, and Geronimo (1939) with Preston Foster, Ellen Drew, Andy Devine, and Chief Thundercloud.

He died on November 15, 1963 in Santa Monica, California.

== Partial filmography ==
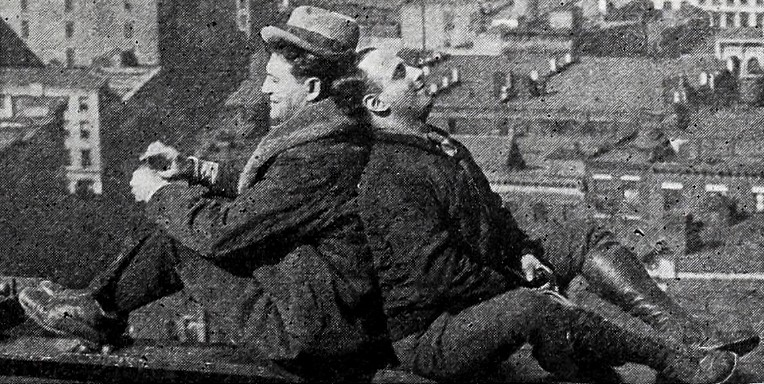
Richard Dix and director Paul Sloane resting between scenes of The Shock Punch (1925)

=== Screenwriter ===
- The Cossack Whip (1916)
- The Lady of the Photograph (1917)
- The Tiger's Cub (1920)
- The Dead Line (1920)
- Beyond Price (1921)
- A Stage Romance (1922)
- The Town That Forgot God (1922)
- Who Are My Parents? (1922)
- If Winter Comes (1923)
- Homeward Bound (1923)

=== Director ===
- Too Many Kisses (1925)
- The Shock Punch (1925)
- Made for Love (1926)
- Eve's Leaves (1926)
- Corporal Kate (1926)
- Turkish Delight (1927)
- The Blue Danube (1928)
- Hearts in Dixie (1929)
- The Cuckoos (1930)
- Half Shot at Sunrise (1930)
- War Correspondent (1932)
- The Woman Accused (1933)
- Lone Cowboy (1933)
- Straight Is the Way (1934)
- Here Comes the Band (1935)
- The Texans (1938)
- Geronimo (1939)
- The Sun Sets at Dawn (1950), screenwriter and director
