= The Woman Accused =

1933 film by Paul Sloane

- Directed by: Paul Sloane
- Written by: Bayard Veiller; Polan Banks (story)
- Starring: Nancy Carroll; Cary Grant; John Halliday
- Cinematography: Karl Struss
- Distributed by: Paramount Pictures
- Release date: February 17, 1933
- Running time: 70 minutes
- Country: United States
- Language: English

The Woman Accused is a 1933 American pre-Code drama film directed by Paul Sloane and starring Nancy Carroll and Cary Grant as a young engaged couple on a sea cruise, with the woman being implicated in the death of her former lover. The supporting cast includes Jack La Rue in a sequence opposite Grant in which the latter violently whips him.

== Cast ==
- Nancy Carroll as Glenda O'Brien
- Cary Grant as Jeffrey Baxter
- John Halliday as Stephen Bessemer
- Irving Pichel as District Attorney Clark
- Louis Calhern as Leo Young
- Norma Mitchell as Martha
- Jack La Rue as Little Maxie
- Frank Sheridan as Inspector Swope
- John Lodge as Dr. Simpson
- William J. Kelly as Captain of Boat
- Harry Holman as Judge Osgood
- Jay Belasco as Tony Graham
- Gertrude Messinger as Evelyn Craig
- Lona Andre as Cora Matthews
