= Ivan Linow =

American actor (1888–1940)

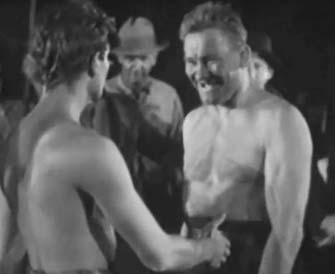
- Ivan Linow about to fight Joel McCrea in 1930's The Silver Horde.
- Born: Jānis Linaus; November 21, 1888; Latvia
- Died: November 21, 1940 (aged 52); London, England, United Kingdom
- Occupations: Wrestler, actor
- Years active: 1918–1935

Ivan Linow (born Jānis Linaus; November 21, 1888 – November 21, 1940), also known as Jack Linow, was a Latvian-born American wrestler, who became a character actor in American films during the silent and early sound film eras.

== Biography ==
Born in Latvia on November 21, 1888, Linow began wrestling in the United States in 1918. Between 1918 and 1933, he participated in 92 matches, with a record of 38 wins and 23 losses. Linow's monikers in the ring were "the Cossack" and the "Russian Man-Eater". During his wrestling career, he faced other notable wrestlers of that era, such as Joe Stecher and Ed Lewis.

Using his popularity as a wrestler, Linow entered the film industry during the 1920s, his first film being Cappy Ricks (1921). In his fifteen-year acting career, he appeared in over forty films in supporting and bit parts. While appearing in films, Linow continued his wrestling career. In his final match in July 1931, under the pseudonym Jack Leon, he defeated Young Sandow. Linow retired from films two years later, in 1935; his final film was The Black Room, starring Boris Karloff. On November 21, 1940, while in London, Linow died of a heart attack.

== Filmography ==
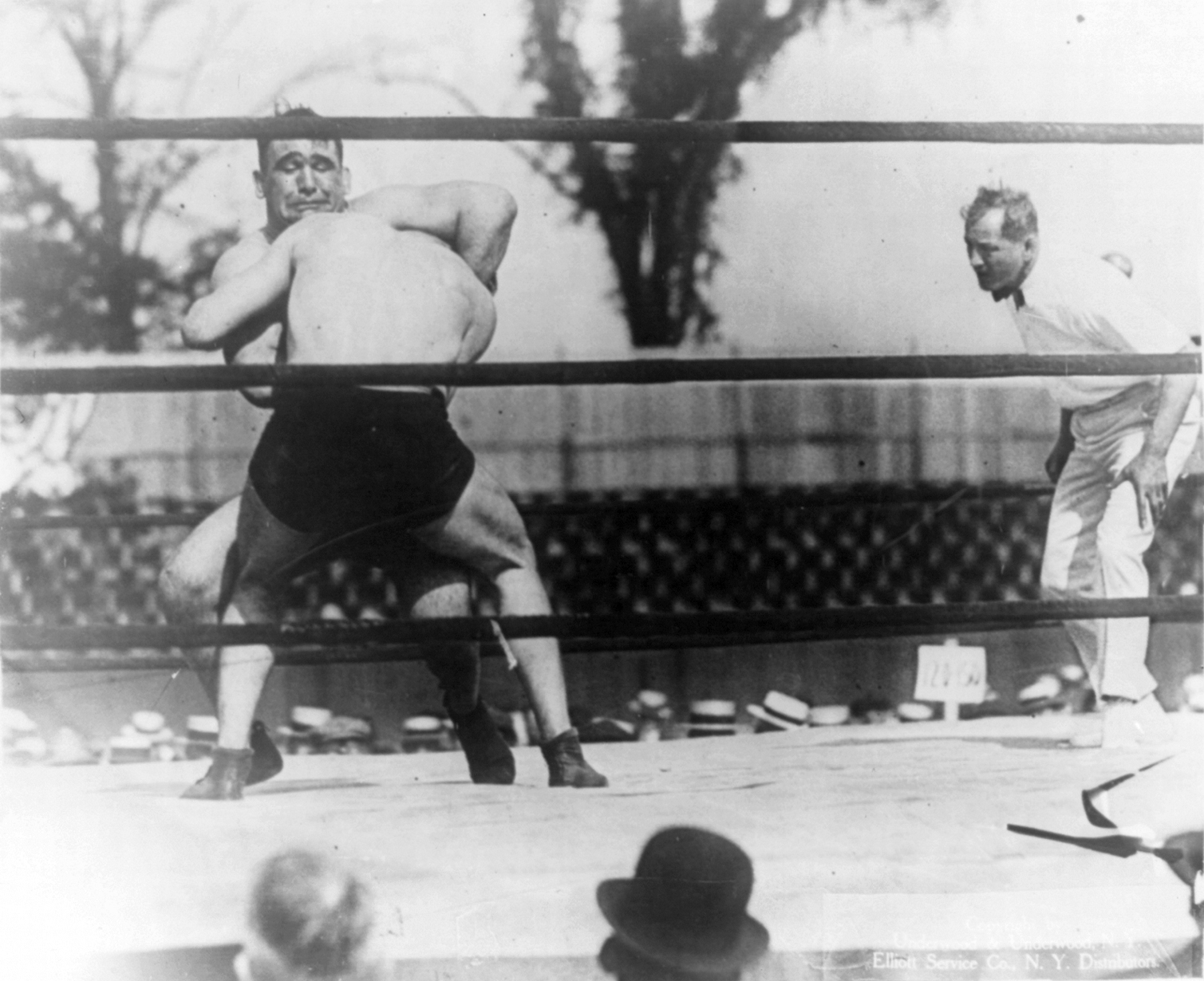
Ed 'Strangler' Lewis and Linow in the ring, 1920.

(Per AFI database)

- Cappy Ricks (1921)
- Enemies of Women (1923)
- Fury (1923)
- Zaza (1923)
- The Story Without a Name (1924)
- Three Miles Out (1924)
- Wages of Virtue (1924)
- Lover's Island (1925)
- Sunken Silver (1925)
- His Rise to Fame (1927)
- The Crimson Flash (1927)
- The Noose (1928)
- Plastered in Paris (1928)
- The Red Dance (1928)
- In Old Arizona (1929)
- Black Magic (1929)
- The Cock-Eyed World (1929)
- The Far Call (1929)
- The River (1929)
- Speakeasy (1929)
- City Girl (1930)
- Just Imagine (1930)
- Madonna of the Streets (1930)
- Numbered Men (1930)
- The Ship from Shanghai (1930)
- The Silver Horde (1930)
- Song of the Flame (1930)
- Temple Tower (1930)
- The Unholy Three (1930)
- Goldie (1931)
- It's Tough to Be Famous (1932)
- Scarlet Dawn (1932)
- The Sport Parade (1932)
- Jewel Robbery (1932)
- Rackety Rax (1932)
- Tillie and Gus (1933)
- The Cat's-Paw (1934)
- Kid Millions (1934)
- Wharf Angel (1934)
- The Merry Frinks (1934)
- The Black Room (1935)
- Vagabond Lady (1935)
