= Paul Tong Viet Buong =

Paul Tống Viết Bường (c. 1773 – 1833) was a martyr of Vietnam, beheaded on October 23, 1833. He was beatified by Pope Leo XIII in 1900. In 1988, he was canonized by Pope John Paul II.

== Life ==
The son and grandson of mandarins, Buong was born about 1773 in Phu Cam near the Citadel of Hue. He had two wives and a total of twelve children. He served as a captain in the royal guard. In 1831, the montagnards at Đá Vách in Quảng Nam rebelled against the local authorities, and Buong, as a platoon leader of the royal garrison, was sent to pacify the rebellion. Upon their return, some of the officers went to Non Nước Pagoda to give thanks, but Buong did not participate. When news of this reached Emperor Minh Mang he summoned Buong.

The Emperor pointed out that it was customary after a victory in battle for the commander to take his company to a nearby pagoda for prayers, and asked him why he didn't. Buong replied that he was a Christian. The angry king ordered Buong be beheaded, but court ministers intervened. The king ordered him to be beaten, stripped of all his titles and benefits, and reduced to a commoner.

This confirmed the Emperor's suspicion that there were a number of Christians at court. He then passed new laws on regulations for religious groups, and Catholicism was officially prohibited. He subsequently ordered an inventory of the Christians in the armed forces. As Buong had been dismissed, he was not on the list, but the king had him arrested along with twelve others. Buong was devoted to Mary and prayed to remain loyalty to his faith. When they refused to sign a pledge disavowing Catholicism they were subjected to torture. Six then signed, but Buong and the rest remained firm.

Because Buong was highly respected, the king wanted the execution to take place quietly so as not arouse public opinion. The sentence was carried out at Tho Duc about 600 meters from his house on the evening of October 23, 1833. Buong's body was buried in the sanctuary of Phu Cam church.

On May 27, 1900, he was beatified by Pope Leo XIII. On June 19, 1988, Pope John Paul II canonized him.

== See also ==
- Vietnamese Martyrs
