= Imatra (cinema) =

Former cinema in Tampere, Finland; burned down in 1927

Coordinates: 61°29′N 23°45′E

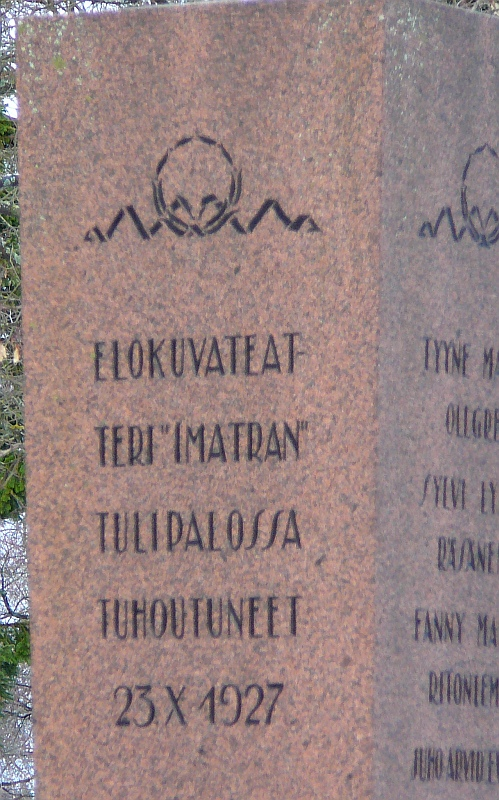
Memorial for the victims of the fire in Kalevankangas cemetery, Tampere

Imatra was a cinema in Tampere, Finland, located in Hämeenkatu 12.

The theatre was built in an old warehouse. The outer walls of the building were made of brick, but the interior structures were made of wood.

On October 23, 1927, the cinema was destroyed in a fire. The cinema was showing Wages of Virtue (1924), featuring Gloria Swanson, and about 200 people were in the audience, about 80 of whom were in the balcony. The fire was caused by ignition of nitrate film in the projection room just before the pause between reels 3 and 4. The 18-year-old projectionist tried to extinguish the burning film, but the hot gases exploded, throwing him out of the room and leaving the door open. The fire spread to the rest of the building within minutes and a large part of the audience was trapped inside. Some people jumped off the balcony and were injured. When the fire brigade arrived, the whole building was already on fire.

20 people died in the fire and 28 were injured; one of the injured died in the hospital. Over 20,000 people were present at the funeral of the victims, and a memorial was unveiled in 1928 in Kalevankangas Cemetery in Tampere.

== Sources ==
- Koskesta voimaa: Aherrusta ja murhetta v. 1927 (in Finnish)
- Tampereen elokuvateatterien historia on värikäs ja dramaattinen (in Finnish)
- Elokuvateatteri Imatran palo osoitti nitraattifilmien vaarallisuuden (in Finnish)

This article is based on material found in the equivalent Finnish Wikipedia article, Elokuvateatteri Imatra.
