= Wages of Virtue =

1924 film by Allan Dwan

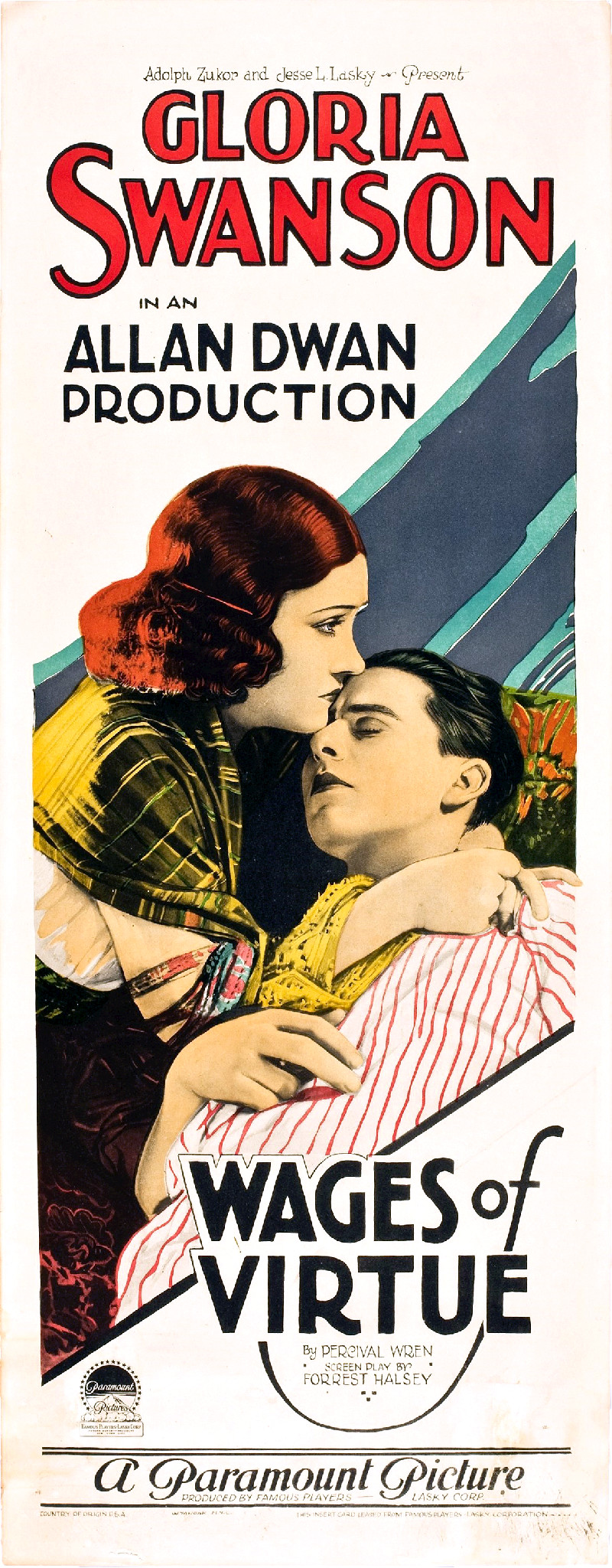
- Film poster
- Directed by: Allan Dwan
- Screenplay by: Forrest Halsey
- Based on: Wages of Virtue by Percival Christopher Wren
- Produced by: Jesse L. Lasky; Adolph Zukor
- Starring: Gloria Swanson; Ben Lyon; Norman Trevor; Ivan Linow
- Cinematography: George Webber
- Production company: Famous Players–Lasky Corporation
- Distributed by: Paramount Pictures
- Release date: November 10, 1924
- Running time: 70 minutes
- Country: United States
- Language: Silent (English intertitles)

Wages of Virtue is a 1924 American silent drama film directed by Allan Dwan and written by Forrest Halsey and Percival Christopher Wren. The film stars Gloria Swanson, Ben Lyon, Norman Trevor, Ivan Linow, Armand Cortes, Adrienne D'Ambricourt, and Paul Panzer. The film was released on November 10, 1924, by Paramount Pictures. It was shot at the Astoria Studios in New York.

It is based on a novel by Percival Christopher Wren, best known as the author of Beau Geste. Like that story, Wages of Virtue is based around the French Foreign Legion, and an Italian woman who runs a café in Algiers frequented by the Legionnaires.

== Plot ==
As described in a review in a film magazine, Luigi, a strong man, head of a small show, saves the life of a young woman, Carmelita, and persuades her to join his company. His assistant, Giuseppe, arouses his jealousy and he kills him. To escape the police, Luigi leaves, taking Carmelita with him, and they finally land in a garrison town in Algiers. Luigi joins the French Foreign Legion and installs Carmelita as proprietress of a café which attracts the soldiers. Among them is an American, Marvin, who falls in love with her, but she is held to Luigi by gratitude until she learns that he is planning to marry Madame Cantiniere, a widow who runs another café. Luigi, jealous of Marvin, frames him and he is punished by the military authorities. Later they have a fight and Marvin is being overpowered when Carmelita stabs Luigi. The soldiers, who love her, spread the report that he was killed in a fight with an Arab, and Carmelita and Marvin find happiness together.

== Cast ==
- Gloria Swanson as Carmelita
- Ben Lyon as Marvin
- Norman Trevor as John Boule
- Ivan Linow as Luigi
- Armand Cortes as Giuseppe
- Adrienne D'Ambricourt as Madame Cantinière
- Paul Panzer as Sergeant LeGros
- Joe Moore as Le Bro-way

== Preservation ==
With no prints of Wages of Virtue located in any film archives, it is a lost film.

The film was shot on extremely flammable nitrate film. One copy ignited while being projected in movie theatre Imatra in Tampere, Finland on 23 October 1927, causing the deadliest movie theatre fire in Finland ever, with 40 casualties.

== Bibliography ==
- Frederic Lombardi. Allan Dwan and the Rise and Decline of the Hollywood Studios. McFarland, 2013.
