= Maryland Morne =

American silent film actress (c. 1900 – 1935)

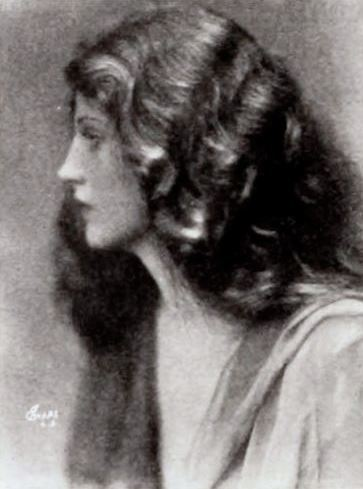
- Morne pictured in 1921.
- Born: July 15, 1900; Baltimore
- Died: July 18, 1935 (aged 35); Los Angeles
- Occupation: Actress
- Years active: 1919–1930
- Spouse: Eugene Strong (married 1934)

Maryland Morne (sometimes credited as Mary Morne; c. July 15, 1900 – July 18, 1935) was an American stage and silent film actor. During her life and after her death, she was believed to have inspired the depiction of Lady Liberty on the peace dollar, earning her the nickname of "Peace Dollar Girl."

== Early life ==
Morne was born Mae Jones around the year 1900 in Baltimore, though she was marketed as having been born in England. Her paternal ancestry was French, and contemporary media claimed that she was also a relative of Stonewall Jackson through her maternal line. Her father was a successful lumber merchant in New York City.

Morne attended a convent school in Chicago. Her first acting role was in a stage production of Alice in Wonderland at the age of seven. In 1917, Morne volunteered with the Red Cross, fundraising to purchase tobacco for American troops serving in Europe during the First World War.

== Career ==
Morne began her career as a professional model. Her first known screen role was as Ann Montgomery in The Boomerang (1919), directed by Bertram Bracken. The next year, she was cast by Allan Dwan in his now-lost movie, In the Heart of a Fool.

In 1921, Morne appeared as Ariel in a stage production of The Tempest at the Hollywood Bowl, having studied under Gwendolyn Logan. Her casting as Jane McKaye in Kindred of the Dust the next year, playing the sister of Ralph Graves, marked her third appearance on screen. Directed by Raoul Walsh, the film was based upon a novel of the same name by Peter B. Kyne. The film's production, which also starred Walsh's wife Miriam Cooper, was complicated for its cast and crew by the clear breakdown of Walsh and Cooper's relationship during filming.

Morne appeared in an early 1923 run of the John L. Hobble play, Daddies, starring Vincent Coleman. Later that year, she played at the Ritz Theatre alongside Robert Strange in a production of In Love With Love. The production, which also featured Lynn Fontanne, Henry Hull, and Berton Churchill, was deemed one of the best plays of the 1923–24 season by Burns Mantle.

In 1930, Morne was cast in the mystery film The Last of the Lone Wolf, starring Bert Lytell and Patsy Ruth Miller. She played the Queen of Saxonia opposite on-screen partner Alfred Hickman.

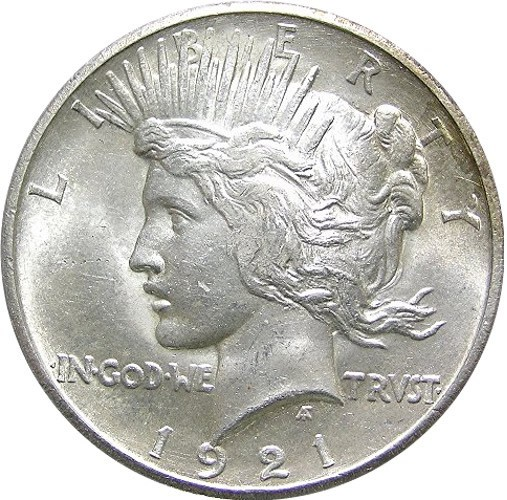
1921 peace dollar.

=== Peace dollar ===
In 1921, the United States Mint invited artists to submit designs for the peace dollar, a coin intended to celebrate the ending of the First World War. The winner, Anthony de Francisci, submitted a design featuring the Goddess of Liberty in profile. Though his primary model was his wife, Teresa de Francisci, he described the face as a "composite [that] typified something of America," leading to speculation that another influence for the coin had been Maryland Morne. The media referred to Morne by variations of the moniker "peace dollar girl," such as "million dollar girl."

=== Other creative endeavours ===
Morne enjoyed writing. Over the course of filming In the Heart of a Fool, she met William Allen White, the writer whose novel formed the basis of director Dwan's screenplay. He shared an idea for a novel with Morne, and gave her his blessing to write the work on his behalf. Morne also wrote poetry in her spare time.

== Personal life ==
Morne married three times. Her first husband was Herbert Hughes, a real estate agent and rancher. They married in 1914 against the wishes of Morne's family, and claimed to have met while attending college together, though Morne was around 15 years old at the time. They divorced in May 1918, after Hughes refused to support her and their child financially. Her second husband was Joel Benito Revira; they married on July 28, 1924.

Morne married actor Eugene Strong in December 1934, shortly before she died from tuberculosis complications in Los Angeles in July 1935. She was cremated and interred at the Abbey of the Psalms mausoleum at Hollywood Forever Cemetery. She was survived by her daughter, Barbara Rovira. After briefly working in the film industry herself, Rovira ran a ranch (Rancho Rovira) in Crestline and bred purebred Morgan horses.

== Filmography ==
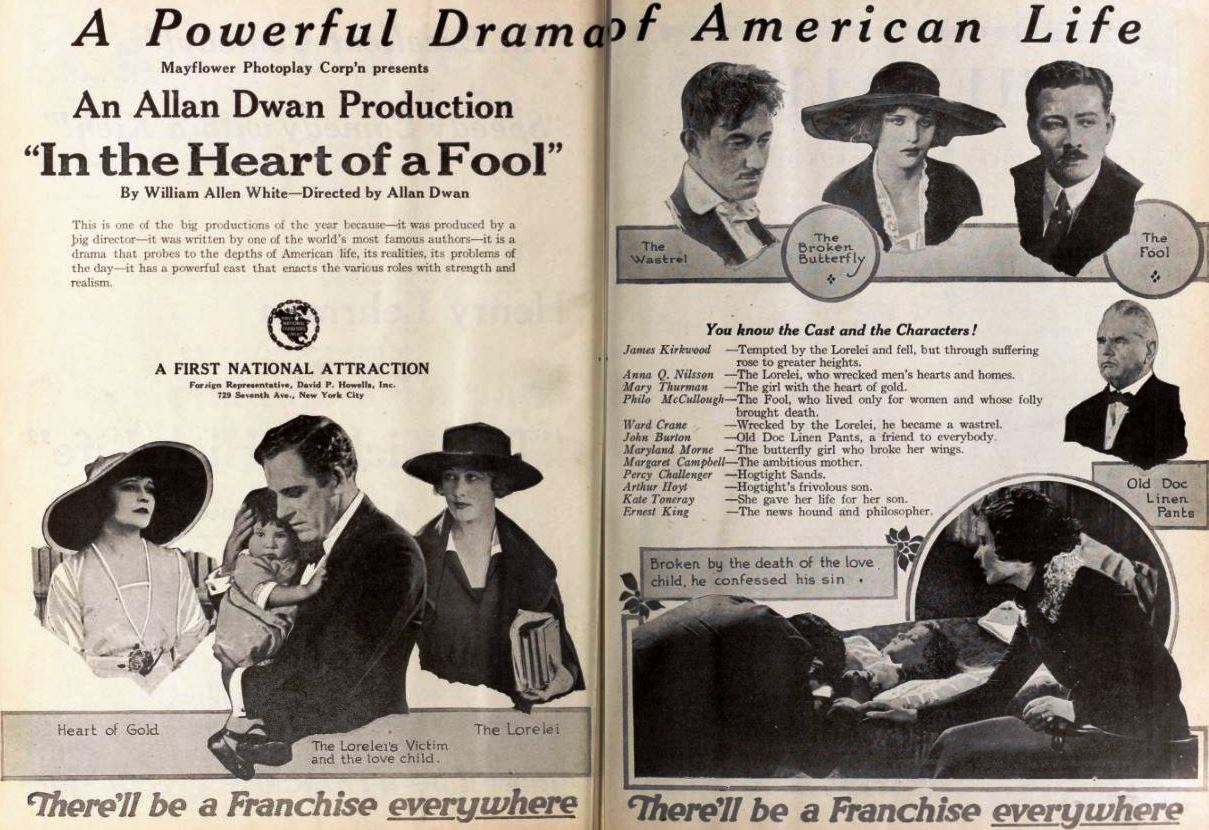
In the Heart of a Fool (1920).

Extant media

- Ann Montgomery in The Boomerang (1919)
- Jane McKaye in Kindred of the Dust (1922)
- The Queen of Saxonia in The Last of the Lone Wolf (1930)

Other appearances

- Violet Mauling in In the Heart of a Fool (1920) – lost movie
