= The Innocent Sinner =

1917 film by Raoul Walsh

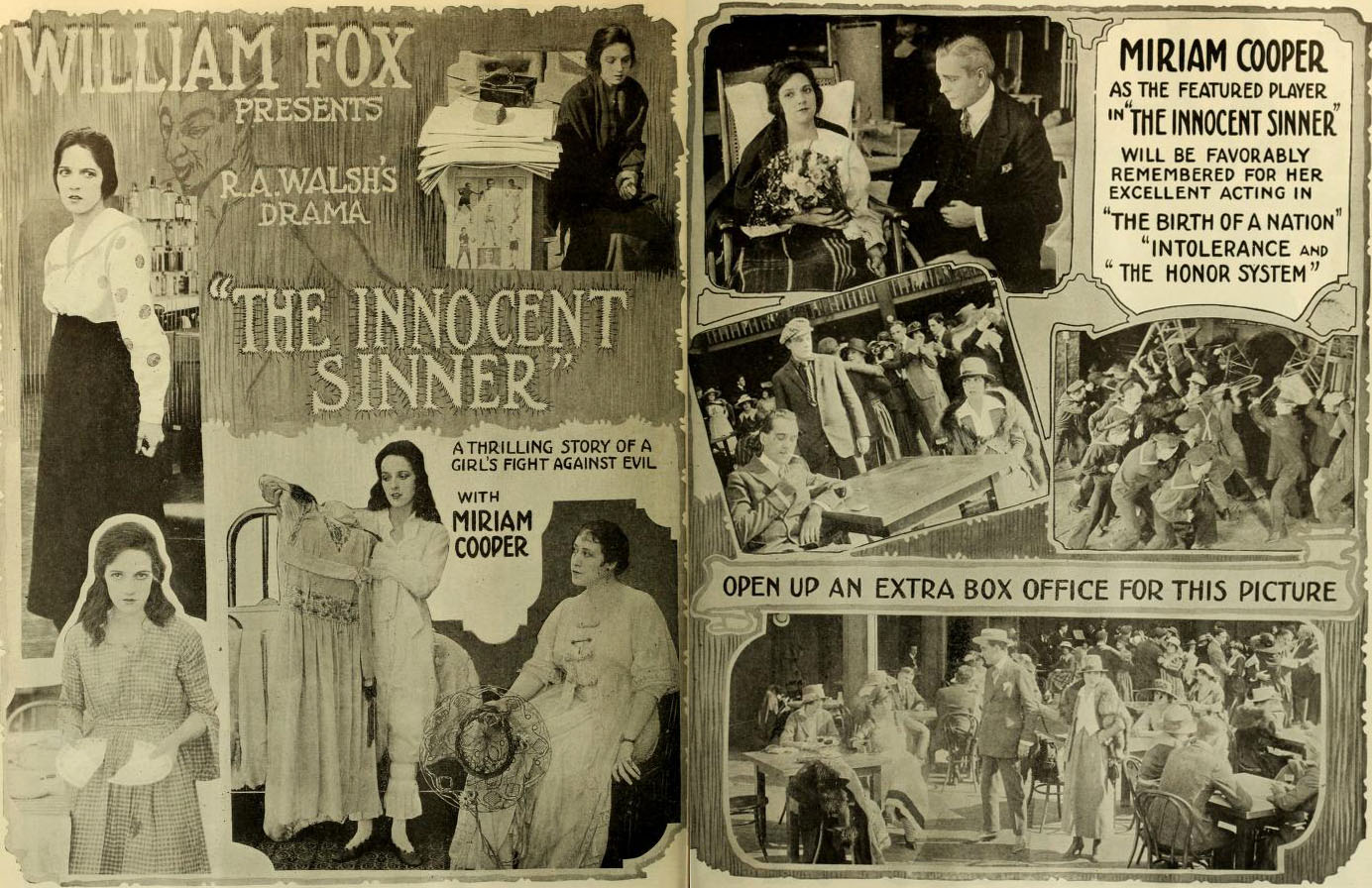
- Directed by: Raoul Walsh
- Written by: Mary Synon; Raoul Walsh
- Starring: Miriam Cooper; Charles Clary; Jack Standing
- Cinematography: Dal Clawson
- Production company: Fox Film
- Distributed by: Fox Film
- Release date: July 21, 1917
- Running time: 50 minutes
- Country: United States
- Languages: Silent; English intertitles

The Innocent Sinner is a 1917 American silent drama film directed by Raoul Walsh and starring Miriam Cooper, Charles Clary and Jack Standing.

== Cast ==
- Miriam Cooper as Mary Ellen Ellis
- Charles Clary as David Graham
- Jack Standing as Walter Benton
- Jane Novak as Jane Murray
- Rosita Marstini as Madame De Coeur
- William Parsons as Bull Clark
- Johnny Reese as The Weasel
- Jennie Lee as Mother Ellis

== Release ==
Before The Innocent Sinner could be exhibited in Kansas, the Kansas Board of Review required the insertion of a new intertitle, saying "So he married you then and now wants to desert you."

== Bibliography ==
- Solomon, Aubrey. The Fox Film Corporation, 1915-1935: A History and Filmography. McFarland, 2011.
