= After the Ball (1924 film) =

1924 film directed by Dallas M. Fitzgerald

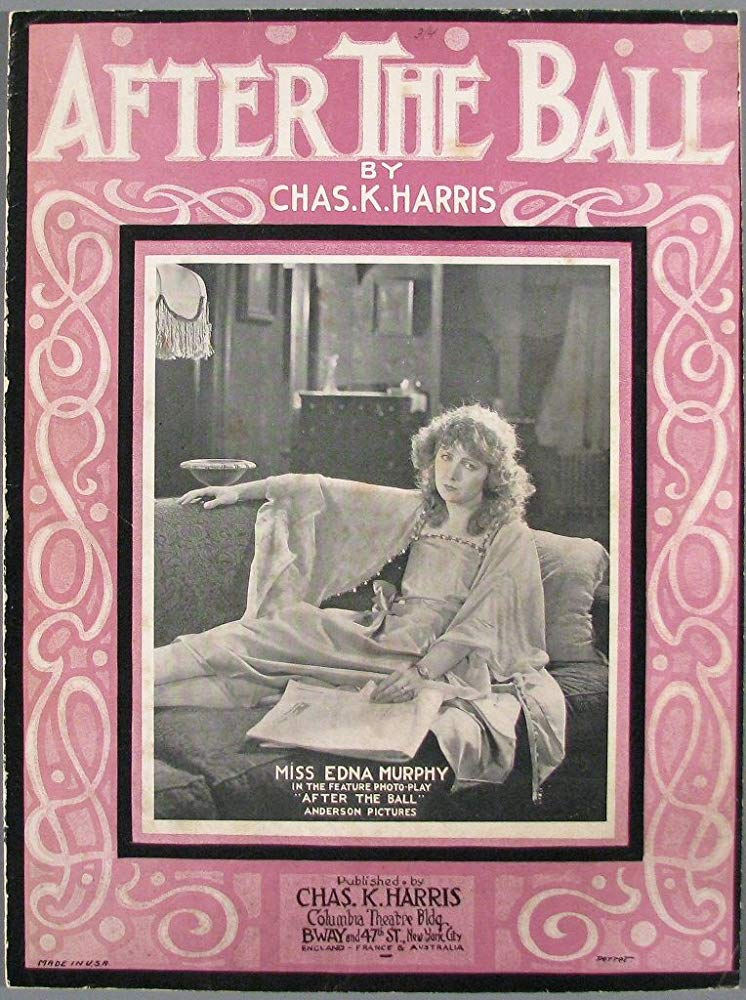
- Directed by: Dallas M. Fitzgerald
- Written by: James Colwell; Charles K. Harris
- Starring: Gaston Glass; Miriam Cooper; Edna Murphy
- Cinematography: Ross Fisher
- Production company: Renco Film Company
- Distributed by: Film Booking Offices of America
- Release date: January 27, 1924
- Running time: 70 minutes
- Country: United States
- Language: Silent (English intertitles)

After the Ball is a lost 1924 American silent drama film directed by Dallas M. Fitzgerald and starring Gaston Glass, Miriam Cooper, and Edna Murphy.

== Plot ==
As described in a film magazine review, Arthur Trevelyan, the dissolute son of Mark Trevelyan, is put out of his home when he marries a young woman of whom his father disapproves. Through the press of circumstances, Arthur is forced to exchange clothes with a crook, who is later shot. The newspapers report that it is Arthur who was killed, and the real Arthur is jailed for the crime. After some time he escapes and finds that he is the father of a five year old child. The real culprit confesses to the crime, and Arthur is exonerated.

== Cast ==
- Gaston Glass as Arthur Trevelyan
- Miriam Cooper as Lorraine Trevelyan
- Tom Guise as Mark Trevelyan
- Robert Frazer as District Attorney
- Edna Murphy as Arthur's Wife
- Eddie Gribbon as A Crook

== Preservation ==
With no holdings located in archives, After the Ball is considered a lost film.

== Bibliography ==
- Munden, Kenneth White. The American Film Institute Catalog of Motion Pictures Produced in the United States, Part 1. University of California Press, 1997.
