= Richard Boleslawski =

Polish theatre and film director, actor

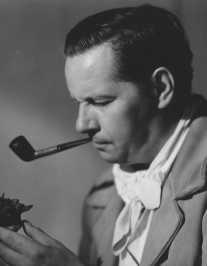
- Born: Bolesław Ryszard Srzednicki; February 4, 1889; Mohyliv-Podilskyi, Russian Empire
- Died: January 17, 1937 (aged 47); Hollywood, California, US
- Other name: Bolesław Ryszard Srzednicki
- Occupations: Acting teacher • Actor • Theater and Film director
- Spouses: Maria Efremova (divorced) Natalia Platonova (div. 1929) Norma Drury (m. 1929)

Richard Boleslawski (born Bolesław Ryszard Srzednicki; February 4, 1889 – January 17, 1937) was a Polish theatre and film director, actor and teacher of acting.

== Biography ==
Richard Boleslawski was born Bolesław Ryszard Srzednicki on February 4, 1889, in Mohyliv-Podilskyi, in the Russian Empire to an ethnic Polish family of Catholic faith. He graduated from the Tver Cavalry Officers School. He trained as an actor at the First Studio of the Moscow Art Theatre under Konstantin Stanislavski and his assistant Leopold Sulerzhitsky, where he was introduced to the 'system'.

During World War I, Boleslawski fought as a cavalry lieutenant on the Tsarist Russian side until the fall of the Russian Empire. He left Russia after the October Revolution of 1917 for his native Poland, where he directed his first movies. As his birth name was difficult to pronounce, he took the name Ryszard Bolesławski. His Miracle at the Vistula (Cud nad Wisłą) was a semi-documentary about the miraculous victory of the Poles at the Vistula River over the superior Soviet Russian forces during the Polish-Soviet War of 1919–1921.

Boleslawski acted in Love One Another (Die Gezeichneten, 1922), a German silent film directed by Danish director Carl Theodor Dreyer. In September 1922, he made his way to New York City, where, now known as "Richard Boleslawski" (the English spelling of his name), he began to teach Stanislavski's 'system' (which, in the US, developed into Method acting) with fellow émigré Maria Ouspenskaya. In 1923, he founded the American Laboratory Theatre in New York. Among his students were Lee Strasberg, Stella Adler and Harold Clurman, who were all founding members of the Group Theatre (1931–1940), the first American acting ensemble to utilize Stanislavski's techniques.

In 1929 he directed Walter Ferris and Basil Rathbone's Judas at the Longacre Theatre.

Offered a contract to direct Hollywood films, Boleslawski made several significant films with some of the major stars of the day.

He died suddenly from a cardiac arrest a few weeks short of his 48th birthday, on January 17, 1937. He is interred in the Calvary Cemetery, East Los Angeles.

== Personal life ==
Boleslawski was married at least three times and had a son with his last wife, Norma.

== In popular culture ==
Hugh Walpole, who worked with Boleslawski on the script for Les Misérables (1935), dedicated his 1937 novel John Cornelius to him with an In Memoriam poem.

For his contribution to the motion picture industry, Boleslawski has a star on the Hollywood Walk of Fame at 7021 Hollywood Blvd.

== Filmography ==
Films directed by Richard Boleslavsky (also credited as Ryszard Bolesławski and Richard Boleslawski):

=== in Russia ===
- Tri Vstrechi
- Khlieb (1918)

=== in Poland ===
- Bohaterstwo Polskiego Skauta (1920)
- Cud nad Wisłą (The Miracle at the Vistula) (1921)

=== in the United States ===
- The Grand Parade (1930), choreography only
- Treasure Girl (1930 short)
- The Last of the Lone Wolf (1930)
- The Gay Diplomat (1930)
- Rasputin and the Empress (1932), teaming Ethel, John, and Lionel Barrymore
- Storm at Daybreak (1933)
- Beauty for Sale (1933)
- Fugitive Lovers (1934)
- Men in White (1934), starring Clark Gable
- Hollywood Party (1934)
- Operator 13 (1934), starring Marion Davies and Gary Cooper
- The Painted Veil (1934), starring Greta Garbo
- Clive of India (1935)
- Les Misérables (1935), starring Fredric March and Charles Laughton
- Metropolitan (1935)
- O'Shaughnessy's Boy (1935)
- Three Godfathers (1936)
- The Garden of Allah (1936), starring Marlene Dietrich and Charles Boyer
- Theodora Goes Wild (1936), starring Irene Dunne
- The Last of Mrs. Cheyney (1937), starring Joan Crawford and William Powell (Boleslavsky died before this film was completed)

== Books ==
- The Way of the Lancer (1932; about the battles of Polish Uhlans in Russia)
- Lances Down (1932)
- Boleslavsky, Richard. 1933 Acting: the First Six Lessons. New York: Theatre Arts, 1987. ISBN 0-87830-000-7. (1933)
- New Features In Acting (1935)

== Sources ==
- Benedetti, Jean. 1999. Stanislavski: His Life and Art. Revised edition. Original edition published in 1988. London: Methuen. ISBN 0-413-52520-1.
