= William Hamilton Osborne =

American screenwriter

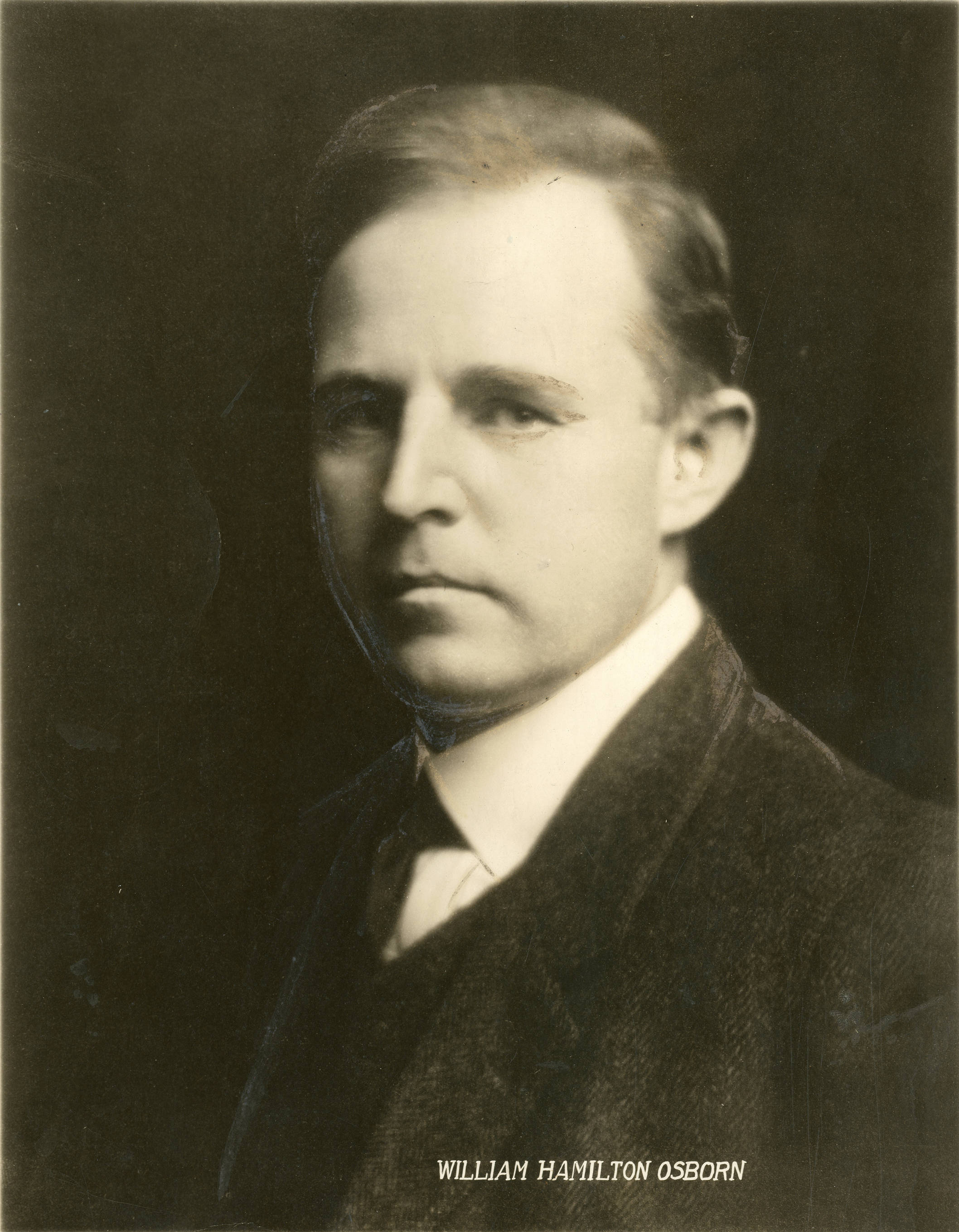

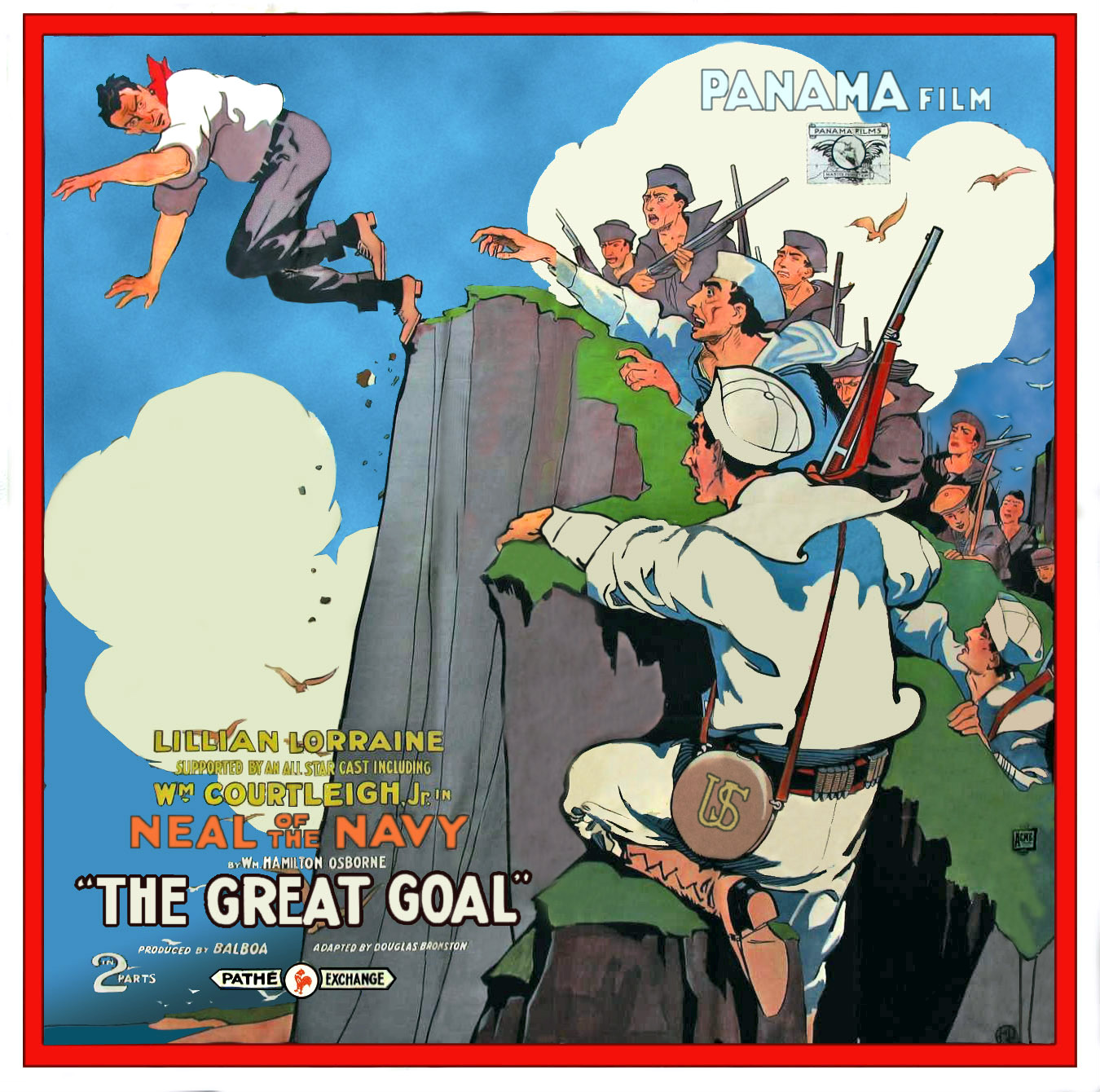
Film poster for the two part feature

William Hamilton Osborne (January 7, 1873 - December 25, 1942) was a lawyer and writer in the U.S. whose work includes stories, novels, and screenplays. Two novels he wrote were made into films and he wrote the screenplay for another. His work was published in various magazines and The Witch's Tales. The Red Mouse is a five act play that starred Valerie Bergere adapted by H.J.W. Dam from Osborne's novel. The New Jersey Historical Society has a collection of his papers donated by his wife.

He studied at Columbia University School of Law and represented the Authors League of America.

== Bibliography ==
=== Books ===
- The Red Mouse: A Mystery Romance (1909)
- The Catspaw (1911), illustrated by, F. Graham Cootes
- The Blue Buckle (1913)
- The Boomerang (1915)
- Neal of the Navy, novelized from the movie he wrote
- The Girl of Lost Island (1916)
- How to Make Your Will (1917)
- The Running Fight
- The Sharpshooters
- The Disappearing Coin
- After Death What
- The Stroheim Stethoscope (1926)
- Am Narrenseil (1928)

=== Stories ===
- "An Eye opener” in Sunset Magazine vol. 31, about baseball
- "The Great Boudoor Scene" (1914), Sunset
- "Jim Cradlebaugh, Head-Liner" (1908)
- "Hitting the Rainbow Trail" (1918), with Phil Norton
- "A Crying Shame" (1914, October) The Smart Set

== Filmography ==
- Neal of the Navy (1915)
- The Running Fight (1915), based on his novel
- Hearts or Diamonds? (1918), listed as one of the writers
- The Boomerang (film) (1919), based on his novel
