= The Girl Who Came Back (1923 film) =

1923 film

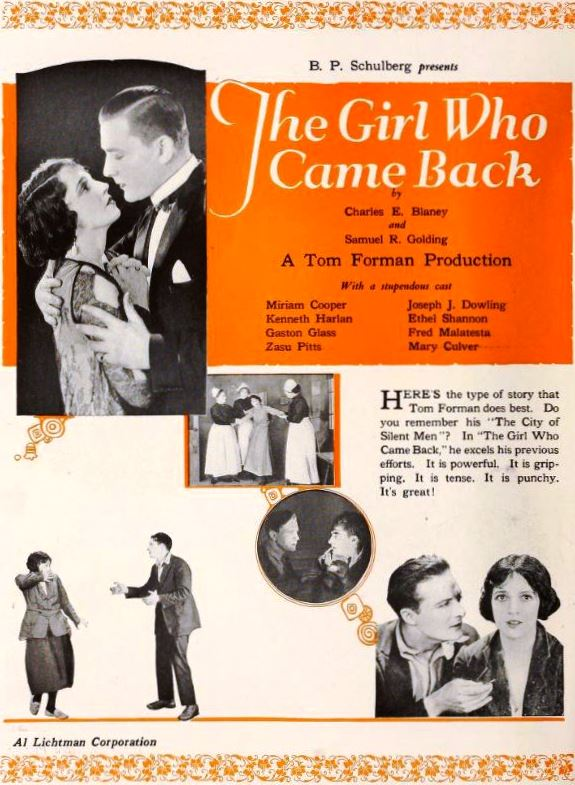
- Directed by: Tom Forman
- Written by: Evelyn Campbell
- Starring: Miriam Cooper; Gaston Glass; Kenneth Harlan
- Cinematography: Harry Perry
- Production company: B.P. Schulberg Productions
- Distributed by: Preferred Pictures
- Release date: April 14, 1923
- Running time: 60 minutes
- Country: United States
- Languages: Silent; English intertitles

The Girl Who Came Back is a 1923 American silent drama film directed by Tom Forman and starring Miriam Cooper, Gaston Glass and Kenneth Harlan.

== Cast ==
- Miriam Cooper as Sheila
- Gaston Glass as Ray Underhill
- Kenneth Harlan as Martin Norries
- Fred Malatesta as Ramon Valhays
- Joseph J. Dowling as Old 565
- Ethel Shannon as Belle Bryant
- Mary Culver as Mayme Miller
- ZaSu Pitts as Anastasia Muldoon

== Bibliography ==
- Connelly, Robert B. The Silents: Silent Feature Films, 1910-36, Volume 40, Issue 2. December Press, 1998.
- Munden, Kenneth White. The American Film Institute Catalog of Motion Pictures Produced in the United States, Part 1. University of California Press, 1997.
