= The Boomerang (1919 film) =

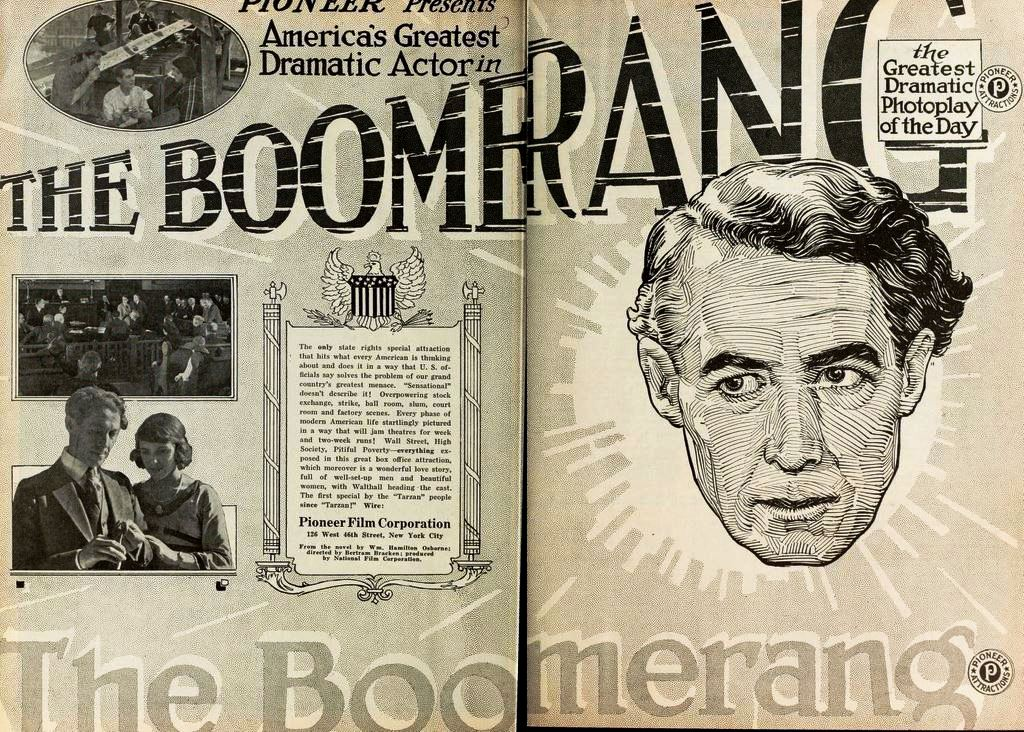
- Advertisement
- Directed by: Bertram Bracken
- Written by: Franklyn Hall
- Based on: The Boomerang by William Hamilton Osborne
- Produced by: National Film Company
- Starring: Henry B. Walthall; Nina Byron
- Cinematography: Joseph Brotherton; Walter Griffin
- Distributed by: State Rights; Pioneer Film Corp.
- Release date: May 1919
- Running time: 70 minutes
- Country: United States
- Language: Silent (English intertitles)

The Boomerang is a 1919 American silent drama film directed by Bertram Bracken. It stars Henry B. Walthall, Melbourne MacDowell, and Nina Byron, and is based on the novel of the same name by William Hamilton Osborne.

== Cast ==
- Henry B. Walthall as George Gray
- Melbourne MacDowell as Peter Cameron
- Nina Byron as Rose Cameron
- Richard Johnson as Lonnie Cameron
- Richard Norris as Maximillian Gray
- Helen Jerome Eddy as Nora Yorke
- Jack McDonald as Napoleon Snape
- Nigel De Brulier as Antonion Giannone
- Beulah Booker as Marie Giannone
- Gordon Sackville as Governor Montgomery
- Maryland Morne as Ann Montgomery
- Lloyd Whitlock as Walter Ames
- William Ryno as Daniel Nathaniel
- Bert Appling as Jim Hardy

== Preservation ==
A print of The Boomerang is preserved in the George Eastman House Motion Picture Collection.
