= The Last of the Lone Wolf =

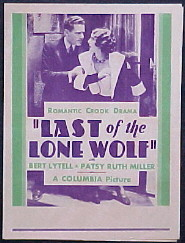
- Film poster
- Directed by: Richard Boleslavsky
- Written by: Dorothy Howell; John T. Neville
- Based on: Last of the Lone Wolf by Louis Joseph Vance
- Produced by: Harry Cohn
- Starring: Bert Lytell; Patsy Ruth Miller; Lucien Prival
- Cinematography: Benjamin Kline
- Edited by: Dave Berg
- Production company: Columbia Pictures
- Distributed by: Columbia Pictures
- Release date: August 26, 1930
- Running time: 70 minutes
- Country: United States
- Language: English
- Box office: $4,000

The Last of the Lone Wolf is a 1930 American mystery film directed by Richard Boleslavsky and starring Bert Lytell. The film is based on the Lone Wolf novels by Louis Joseph Vance.

== Cast ==
- Bert Lytell as the Lone Wolf
- Patsy Ruth Miller as Stephanie
- Lucien Prival as Varril
- Otto Mattieson as Prime Minister
- Alfred Hickman as King
- Maryland Morne as Queen
- Haley Sullican as Camilla
- Pietro Sosso as Master of ceremonies
- Henry Daniel as Count von Rimpau
- James Liddy as Hoffman
