= Betrayed (1917 film) =

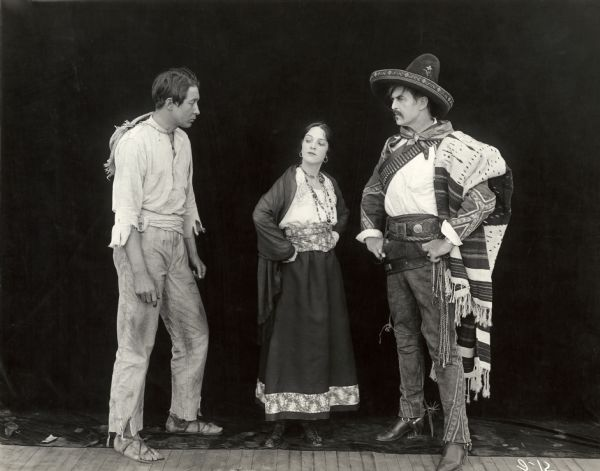
- Blue, Cooper, and Bosworth in costume for a publicity still for Betrayed (1917)
- Directed by: Raoul Walsh
- Written by: Raoul Walsh; C. B. Clapp
- Produced by: William Fox
- Starring: Miriam Cooper; Hobart Bosworth; Monte Blue; James Marcus; Wheeler Oakman
- Cinematography: Del Clawson
- Distributed by: Fox Film Corporation
- Release date: September 2, 1917
- Running time: 50 minutes (5 reels)
- Country: United States
- Language: Silent (English intertitles)

Betrayed is a 1917 silent drama film directed and written by Raoul Walsh, starring Hobart Bosworth, Miriam Cooper, and Monte Blue, and released by Fox Film Corporation. It is not known if the film currently survives, which suggests that it is a lost film.

== Plot ==
Carmelita Carrito, a young Mexican girl, is an aristocrat at heart despite the coarseness exhibited by her father Carpi.

Although she has a lover named Pepo, Carmelita finds herself attracted to the bandit Leopoldo Juares when he takes refuge in her house. After his departure, Carmelita watches wistfully after him, eventually falling asleep by the window.

A U. S. Army officer, William Jerome, comes searching for Juares, and Carmelita, fascinated by the gringo, tells him that Juares is to meet her at the brook. Discovering her duplicity, Juares forces Carmelita to don his hat and coat. Jerome, mistaking Carmelita for the bandit, shoots the girl and is ordered to be executed before a firing squad.

Carmelita then awakens from her dream and discovers that United States troops, led by Pepo, are converging upon her house to arrest Juares, who is hiding there. Pepo captures the bandit and wins a large reward as well as Carmelita's affections.

== Cast ==
- Miriam Cooper as Carmelita Carrito
- James Marcus as Carpi
- Hobart Bosworth as Leopoldo Juares
- Monte Blue as Pepo Esparenza
- Wheeler Oakman as William Jerome

== Censorship ==
Like many American films of the time, Betrayed was subject to cuts by city and state film censorship boards. The Chicago Board of Censors cut an attack on a man, shooting and two rioting scenes in store, attack on driver, shooting man off horse, last part of love scene, and shooting girl and shooting man.
