= The Prussian Cur =

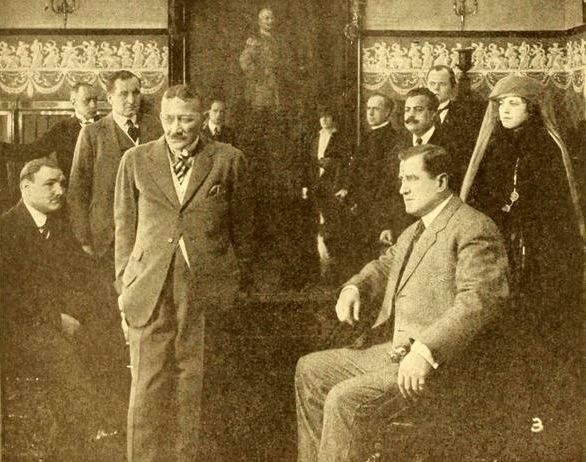
- Film still
- Directed by: Raoul Walsh
- Written by: Raoul Walsh
- Produced by: William Fox
- Starring: Miriam Cooper
- Cinematography: Roy F. Overbaugh
- Production company: Fox Film Corporation
- Release date: September 1, 1918 (U.S.)
- Running time: 7 reels (approximately 70 minutes)
- Country: United States
- Language: Silent (English intertitles)

The Prussian Cur is a 1918 American anti-German silent propaganda film produced during World War I. Now considered a lost film, it is notable for telling the story of the Crucified Soldier.

The film's director, Raoul Walsh, called it his "rottenest picture ever" for its anti-German sentiment, while its star Miriam Cooper (Walsh's wife) called it the worst film in which she had ever appeared.

The film was shot in Fort Lee, New Jersey, where Fox and many other early film studios in America's first motion picture industry were based at the beginning of the 20th century.

== Plot ==
As luridly described in a film magazine, the Kaiser has plans to conquer the world while all of the other nations are engaged in peaceful pursuits. The Germans enter France and their U-boats work like sharks in the sea, and after many insults the RMS Lusitania is sunk, causing the United States to enter the war. Before Bernstorff (McEwen) leaves the country, he establishes a spy system headed by Otto Goltz (von der Goltz). Under his orders, German agents burn factories, wreck trains, stir up labor troubles, and interfere with American war work. Goltz marries a young American woman and brutally drives her to her death. Her sister finds her in a dying condition and takes her home to die. A young brother goes after Goltz, who is running a nest of spies where bombs are being made. Dick Gregory (Mason), an American soldier, sees Goltz on the street dressed in an officer's uniform on a day when a confidential order was given out that no officer was to wear one. Dick follows him and finds the nest of spies. Under his command the regiment wipes out the nest and Goltz while trying to escape is overtaken by the brother of the young dead woman and is killed. Meanwhile, American forces are pouring into France so fast that the Kaiser sees his dream crumbling and dies like a rat.

== Cast ==
- Miriam Cooper as Rosie O'Grady
- Sidney Mason as Dick Gregory
- Captain Horst von der Goltz as Otto Goltz
- Leonora Stewart as Lillian O'Grady
- James Marcus as Patrick O'Grady
- Pat O'Malley as Jimmie O'Grady
- Walter McEwen as Count Johann von Bernstorff
- William W. Black as Wolff von Eidel
- Ralph C. Faulkner as Woodrow Wilson
- Walter M. Lawrence as Wilhelm II
- Charles Reynolds as Wilhelm I
- William Harrison as Crown Prince Frederick
- James Hathaway as Field Marshal von Hindenburg
- P.C. Hartigan as Admiral von Tirpitz
- John E. Franklin as James W. Gerard
- John W. Harbon as U.S. Congressman

== Reception ==
Like many American films of the time, The Prussian Cur was subject to cuts by city and state film censorship boards. For example, the Chicago Board of Censors required cuts, in Reel 1, of the intertitle "Kill the men and save the women for yourselves" and, Reel 8, of a German soldier taking off his coat in a bedroom.

== See also ==
- List of lost films
- 1937 Fox vault fire
