= The Witch's Tales =

US pulp fantasy magazine

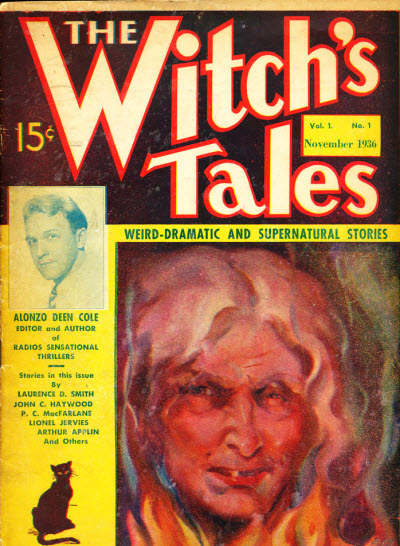
The November 1936 issue; cover art by Elmer Stoner.

The Witch's Tales was an American pulp magazine edited by Tom Chadburn which published two issues in November and December 1936. It was a companion to a radio program, called The Witch's Tale, which had begun broadcasting in May 1931. With the exception of the lead story in each issue, all the stories were reprints from the American edition of Pearson's Magazine. Alonzo Deen Cole, who wrote the radio series, contributed one lead story, and provided the plot for the other. The authors of the reprint stories included George Daulton, Wardon Allan Curtis, William Hamilton Osborne, and John C. Haywood.

== Publication history and contents ==
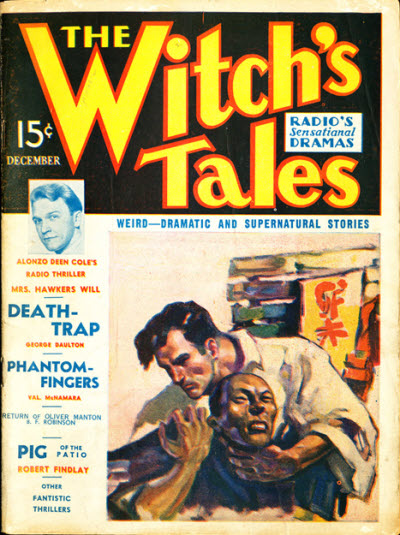
The December 1936 issue; cover art by Elmer Stoner

The Witch's Tale was a radio program that began on American radio in May 1931. A weekly anthology show, it was the first radio horror program, and soon became quite popular. (Note: In a survey of over 3,000 children of both sexes in grades 5 through 8 in 1936, 25% of the children named The Witch's Tale as the radio program that kept them up at night.) In 1936, the magazine The Witch's Tales appeared as a companion to it, perhaps inspired by The Shadow, a successful pulp magazine which had also been launched as the companion of a radio program of the same name. The Witch's Tales was published by The Carwood Publishing Co., a small and relatively inexperienced firm. The named editor of the magazine was Alonzo Deen Cole, who wrote the radio episodes, but the editorial work was actually done by Tom Chadburn. Having both a pulp magazine and radio show act as vehicles for Cole's work is an early example of the 21st century's media industry's approach, with content tied together across more than one media platform, but although Street & Smith demonstrated that this could be done successfully for The Shadow, Carwood did little to promote the radio show in the magazine, probably because of their inexperience. Only one more issue appeared, the following month; it is unlikely that the publisher could have received sales data on the first issue by that time, so there may have been reasons other than poor sales for the magazine's short run, perhaps including weak financing and distribution.

The first issue, dated November 1936, led with "The Madman", a story by Cole about a mad scientist. Cole's work also appeared in the second issue with "Mrs. Hawker's Will". Originally an episode Cole had written for the radio show, it was adapted from the script for the magazine by Laurence D. Smith. All the other stories, from both issues, were reprinted from the American edition of Pearson's Magazine. These included "The Monster of Lake LaMetrie", by Wardon Allan Curtis, from 1899; "The Fountain of Youth", by William Hamilton Osborne, and "Phantom of the Links", (Note: Originally published under the title "The Gray People".) by John C. Haywood, both from 1906; and "The Death-Trap", by George Daulton, which had originally appeared in 1908. The reprints were good stories, in the opinion of Mike Ashley, and they often had science fiction themes: Curtis's story involved the transplant of a man's brain into the body of a prehistoric monster. Despite the relatively high quality of the material, the stories were not action-oriented enough to have pleased a typical pulp magazine reader of the era.

== Bibliographic details ==
The magazine's two issues were dated November and December 1936, and numbered as a single volume of two issues. The publisher was The Carwood Publishing Co., of New York, and the editor was Tom Chadburn. The magazine was in bedsheet format, with 48 pages, and was priced at 15 cents.

== Sources ==
- Ashley, Mike (1997). "Magazines". In Clute, John; Grant, John (eds.). The Encyclopedia of Fantasy. New York: St. Martin's Press, Inc. pp. 611–615. ISBN 978-0-312-15897-2.
- Ashley, Mike (2000). The Time Machines:The Story of the Science-Fiction Pulp Magazines from the beginning to 1950. Liverpool: Liverpool University Press. ISBN 978-0-85323-865-2.
- Ashley, Mike; Parnell, Frank H. (1985). "The Witch's Tales". In Tymn, Marshall B.; Ashley, Mike (eds.). Science Fiction, Fantasy, and Weird Fiction Magazines. Westport CT: Greenwood Press. pp. 742–743. ISBN 978-0-313-21221-5.
- Hand, Richard J. (2006). Terror on the Air!: Horror Radio in America, 1931–1952. McFarland. ISBN 978-0786469192.
- Killmeier, Matthew A. (May 15, 2012). "Aural Atavism: The Witch's Tale and Gothic Horror Radio". Journal of Radio & Audio Media. 19 (1): 61–82. doi:10.1080/19376529.2012.667021.
- Welch, Cindy C. (2008). Broadcasting the Profession: The American Library Association and the National Children's Radio Hour. Urbana Champaign IL: ProQuest LLC.
