= Bedsheet =

Magazine format

The bedsheet format (also known as large pulp) was the size of many magazines published in the United States in the first quarter of the 20th century. Magazines in bedsheet format were roughly the size of Life but with square spines. While the bedsheet size varied slightly from magazine to magazine, a standard bedsheet size is usually 9¾" x 12".

Dick Eney's Fancyclopedia II gives the following entry:

Bedsheet: A prozine size; 9x12. At various times Amazing, Wonder, Fantastic Adventures, ASF and Unknown Worlds attempted this size. The two latter, at least, were cut down by wartime paper shortage, and possibly by the keening of collectors who found these dimensions accident-prone.

The first science fiction magazine, Amazing Stories, was published in a bedsheet format. Later, most magazines changed to the pulp magazine format, roughly the size of comic books or National Geographic but again with a square spine. Now, many magazines are published in digest format, roughly the size of Reader's Digest, although a few are in the standard roughly 8.5" x 11" size, and often have stapled spines, rather than glued square spines. Knowledge of these formats is an asset when locating magazines in libraries and collections where magazines are usually shelved according to size.

Sometimes the description "bedsheet" has been applied to magazines of the bedsheet size but with stapled rather than square spines.

== Magazines that published issues in the bedsheet size ==
- Amazing Stories
- Astounding
- Fantastic Adventures
- Science-Fiction Plus
- Science Wonder Quarterly
- Unknown
- The Witch's Tales
- Wonder Stories
