= The Running Fight =

1915 film by James Durkin

- Directed by: James Durkin
- Written by: William Hamilton Osborne (novel); Louis Albion (scenario); David Perkins (scenario)
- Starring: Violet Heming
- Production company: Pre-Eminent Films
- Distributed by: Paramount Pictures
- Release date: July 15, 1915
- Running time: 5 reels
- Country: United States
- Language: Silent (English intertitles)

The Running Fight is a 1915 American silent drama film, directed by James Durkin and distributed by Paramount Pictures. The film is based on a novel by William Hamilton Osborne, and stars Violet Heming.

== Preservation status ==
The film is preserved today at the Library of Congress.

== Cast ==
- Robert Cummings - Peter V. Wilkinson
- Violet Heming - Leslie Wilkinson
- Thurlow Bergen - Eliot Beekman
- Robert Cain - District Attorney Leech
- William T. Carleton - Colonel Moorehead
- Clarissa Selwynne - Madeline Braine
- George Pauncefort - Giles Illingsworth
- Alfred Kappeler - Roy Pallister
- Philip Robson - Bannister Skeen
