= Evangeline (1919 film) =

1919 film by Raoul Walsh

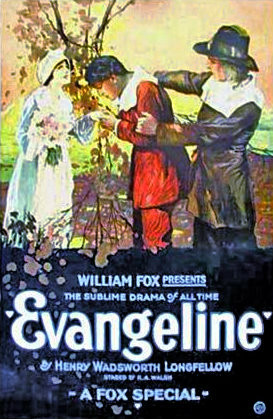
- Directed by: Raoul Walsh
- Written by: Raoul Walsh (scenario)
- Based on: Evangeline by Henry Wadsworth Longfellow
- Produced by: William Fox
- Starring: Miriam Cooper
- Distributed by: Fox Film Corporation
- Release date: September 21, 1919
- Running time: 6 reels (5,200 feet)
- Country: United States
- Language: Silent (English intertitles)

Evangeline is a lost 1919 American silent drama film produced and distributed by the Fox Film Corporation and directed by Raoul Walsh. The star of the film was Walsh's wife, who at the time was Miriam Cooper in the oft filmed story based on the 1847 poem of the same name by Henry Wadsworth Longfellow. The poem was filmed previously in 1908, 1911, and 1914.

Currently Evangeline is considered to be a lost film.

== Plot ==
As described in a film magazine, Evangeline (Cooper) and Gabriel (Roscoe), young people of a small village, gain the consent of their parents and announce their wedding. On the morning of the wedding day, British soldiers land at the town and summon all the Acadians, who are of French descent, to the church where they read the King's order requiring their deportation. The marriage is thus prevented and the two lovers, during the deportation, lose sight of each other and end up in different localities. Released from surveillance, each sets out in search of the other. Their search continues until they are old when Gabriel, victim of a pestilence, is brought to an almshouse where Evangeline is a nurse to the afflicted. Here they are happy for a while until Gabriel's death occurs.

== Cast ==
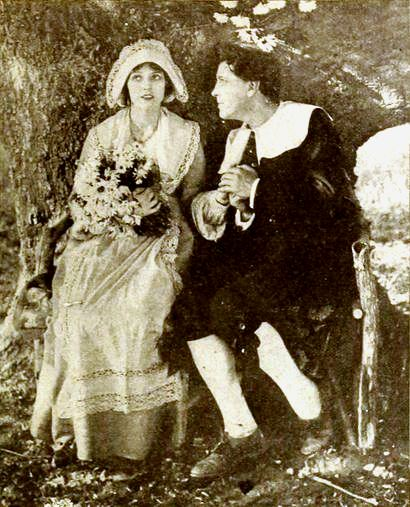
Still of Cooper and Roscoe in Motion Picture Magazine (February 1920)

- Miriam Cooper as Evangeline
- Alan Roscoe as Gabriel
- Spottiswoode Aitken as Benedict Bellefontaine
- James A. Marcus as Basil
- Paul Weigel as Father Felician
- William A. Wellman as A British Lieutenant

== See also ==
- Expulsion of the Acadians

== Sources ==
- Canham, Kingsley. 1973. The Hollywood Professionals, Volume 1: Michael Curtiz, Raoul Walsh, Henry Hathaway. Tanvity Press, New York. ISBN 978-0498012044
