= Kindred of the Dust =

1922 film by Raoul Walsh

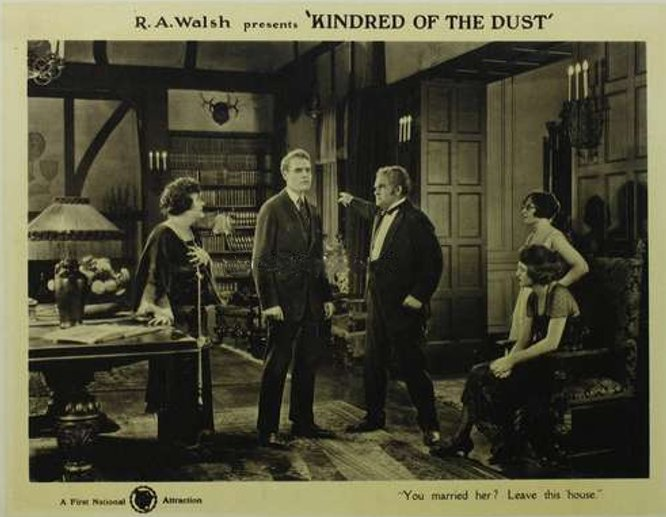
- Movie poster
- Directed by: Raoul Walsh
- Written by: James T. O'Donohoe (screenplay)
- Based on: Kindred of the Dust by Peter B. Kyne
- Produced by: R. A. Walsh Co.
- Starring: Miriam Cooper; Ralph Graves
- Cinematography: H. Lyman Broening; Charles Van Enger
- Distributed by: First National Pictures
- Release date: February 27, 1922
- Running time: 80 minutes
- Country: United States
- Language: Silent (English intertitles)

Kindred of the Dust is a 1922 American silent drama film directed by Raoul Walsh, and starring his wife Miriam Cooper. It was based upon the novel of the same name by Peter B. Kyne. The film was the last independent picture for Walsh's production company, and the last film he and Cooper would make together. Today it is one of Walsh's earliest surviving features, and is one of only two non-D. W. Griffith features of Cooper's that still is known to survive.

== Plot ==
As described in a film magazine, upon discovering that her husband is a bigamist with a son, Nan goes back with her infant son to her father. She of course is ostracized by the local church people. When Donald McKaye returns from college, he is the first to give her sympathy and understanding. Young McKaye loves Nan and wants to marry her, but his father, The Laird of Tyee, has other more ambitious plans for his son and his mother and sisters resent the idea of the mother of a nameless child becoming the wife of the McKaye heir. Nan is ready to give him up, and when Donald yields to his father's wishes and goes to a mountain hut to think it over, she slips away. Donald falls victim to a fever and is taken to a hospital. After resorting to everything else, the mother swallows her pride and sends for Nan, for whom Donald calls constantly. Her presence restores him. The family gives her a cold "thank you" which drives Donald to the final break with his father. He marries Nan and is disinherited. The old Laird refuses to soften, even when, after the man falls into the river from a motor boat headed for the logging camp when a huge log comes down the chute and hits it, the son plunging into the river and saves the father's life. Reconciliation finally comes after a son is born to Donald and Nan.

== Cast ==
- Miriam Cooper as Nan of the Sawdust Pile
- Ralph Graves as Donald McKaye
- Lionel Belmore as The Laird of Tyee
- Eugenie Besserer as Mrs. McKaye
- Maryland Morne as Jane McKaye
- Elizabeth Waters as Elizabeth McKaye
- William J. Ferguson as Mr. Daney
- Caroline Rankin as Mrs. Daney
- Patrick Rooney as Dirty' Dann OLeary
- John Herdman as Caleb Brent
- Bruce Guerin as Little Donald

== Production ==
During filming Cooper accidentally gazed into a stage light causing her permanent eye damage that lasted until the end of her life. The film ended up being Walsh's final independent production and was the last time Cooper and Walsh (who had made several films together) worked together. The film was one of Cooper's last films as she retired in 1923.

== Release ==
The film was released on February 27, 1922. Cooper felt it was mediocre but the film performed decently at the box office. The film still exists and was restored in 2004, is one of the few films from Walsh's early years to survive, and is also one of only two surviving films from Cooper's starring years. The film has been screened at a few film festivals since its restoration but has not been released for home video.
