= The Conqueror (1917 film) =

1917 film directed by Raoul Walsh

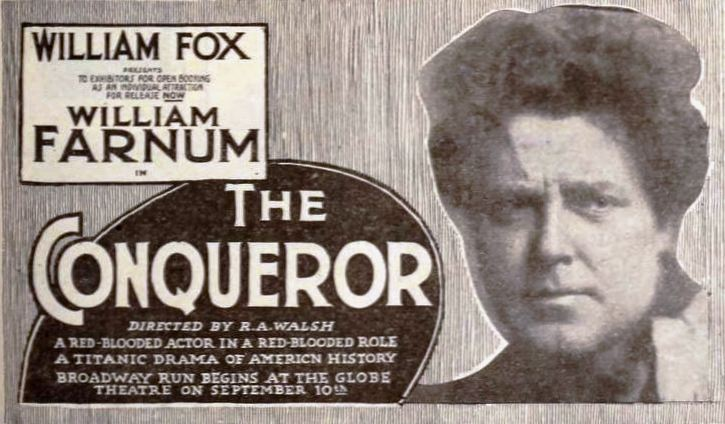
- Advertisement
- Directed by: Raoul Walsh
- Screenplay by: Chester B. Clapp; Raoul Walsh
- Story by: Henry Christeen Warnack
- Produced by: William Fox
- Starring: William Farnum
- Cinematography: Dal Clawson
- Distributed by: Fox Film Corporation
- Release date: September 16, 1917
- Running time: 80 minutes
- Country: United States
- Languages: Silent; English intertitles

The Conqueror is a 1917 American silent biographical Western film directed by Raoul Walsh and starring William Farnum. It was produced and distributed by Fox Film Corporation.

== Plot ==
This was a big budget biography film from William Fox and Raoul Walsh about Sam Houston.

== Cast ==
- William Farnum as Sam Houston
- Jewel Carmen as Eliza Allen
- Charles Clary as Sidney Stokes
- James A. Marcus as Jumbo (credited as J.A. Marcus)
- Carrie Clark Ward as Mammy
- William Chisolm as Dr. Spencer
- Robert Dunbar as Judge Allen
- Owen Jones as James Houston
- William Eagle Shirt as Indian Chief
- Chief Birdhead as Indian Chief
- Little Bear as Indian Chief

== Preservation ==
The Conqueror is considered a lost film as of February 2021.

== See also ==
- 1937 Fox vault fire
