= The Silent Lie =

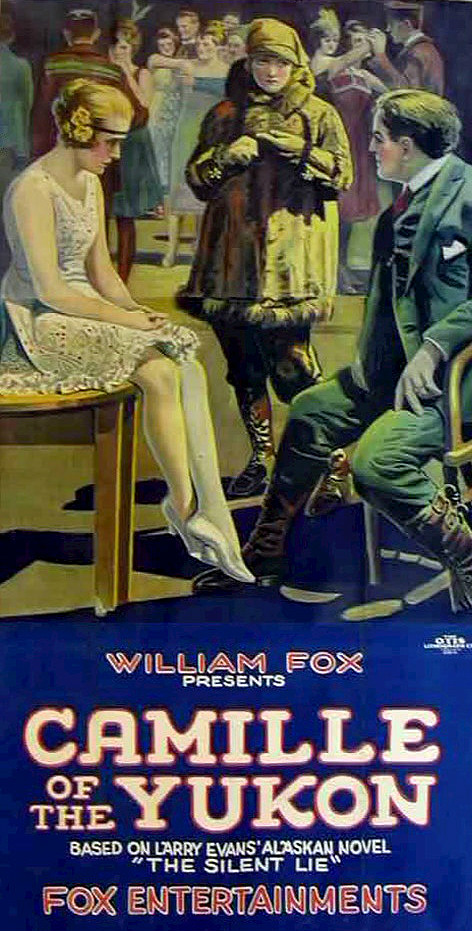
- Theatrical release poster
- Directed by: Raoul Walsh
- Written by: Chester B. Clapp
- Based on: short story "Conahan" by Larry Evans
- Produced by: William Fox
- Starring: Miriam Cooper; Ralph Lewis; Charles Clary
- Cinematography: Dal Clawson
- Distributed by: Fox Film Corporation
- Release date: May 28, 1917
- Running time: 5-6 reels
- Country: United States
- Languages: Silent; English intertitles

The Silent Lie is a 1917 silent drama film, produced and released by Fox Film Corporation, directed by Raoul Walsh, and starring Walsh's then-wife Miriam Cooper.

The film was reissued as Camille of the Yukon in 1920, and is now considered a lost film.

It had five reels.

== Production ==
The film was, according to contemporary sources, partially shot ’in the Truckee district’ in California.

== Cast ==
- Miriam Cooper as Lady Lou
- Ralph Lewis as Hatfield
- Charles Clary as Conahan
- Monroe Salisbury as The Stranger
- Henry A. Barrows as The Priest
- Howard Davies as The Fur Dealer
- William Eagle Shirt as Indian

== Censorship ==
Initially, The Silent Lie was rejected in its entirety by the Kansas Board of Review, but upon review, it passed with several cuts. The scenes shortened were of a dance hall, gambling, and the scenes removed completely were of spitting, changing money, a struggle, and an intertitle saying "I paid you once."

== See also ==
- List of lost films
- 1937 Fox vault fire
