= For Husbands Only =

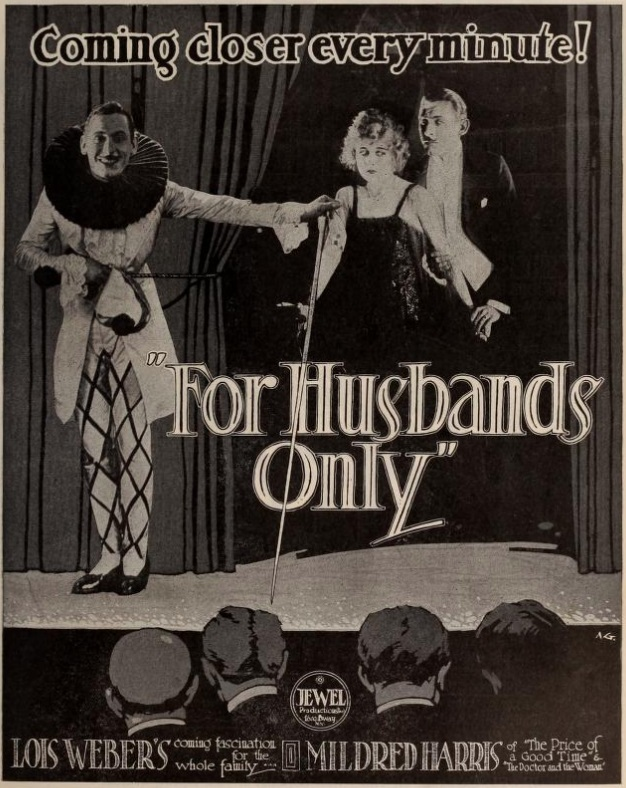
- Directed by: Lois Weber; Phillips Smalley
- Written by: Lois Weber (scenario)
- Story by: G. B. Stern
- Produced by: Lois Weber
- Starring: Mildred Harris; Lew Cody
- Cinematography: Dal Clawson
- Distributed by: Universal Film Manufacturing Company
- Release date: September 18, 1918 (United States)
- Running time: 60 mins.
- Country: United States
- Language: Silent (English intertitles)

For Husbands Only is 1918 American silent comedy-drama film and directed by Lois Weber and her husband Phillips Smalley. The film was distributed by Universal Pictures. The film was apparently made in late 1917 but not released until just before the end of World War I. For Husband's Only is now considered to be a lost film.

== Plot ==
As described in a film magazine, just out of convent, Toni Wilde becomes the inspiration of millionaire bachelor Rolin Van D'Arcy and when he kisses her, she believes herself to be engaged to him. However, she is rudely awakened from this dream and, after finding out that Van D'Arcy is not a marrying man, she marries Samuel Dodge, who is the butt of all jokes in his set. Dodge is delighted and does everything in his power to make her happy. Toni then decides to play with Van D'Arcy to make him regret his actions. Van D'Arcy comes to the point where he wants Toni more than anything else, but his plans to win her prove futile. When Toni believes that she has lost her husband, she realizes that she loves him, and when she finds her fears are unfounded she is very happy.

== Cast ==
- Mildred Harris as Toni Wilde
- Lew Cody as Rolin Van D'Arcy (credited as Lewis J. Cody)
- Fred Goodwins as Samuel Dodge
- Kathleen Kirkham as Mrs. Ellis
- Henry A. Barrows
- Esther Ralston in a bit part (uncredited)
