= L. D. Clawson =

American cinematographer

L. D. "Dal" Clawson
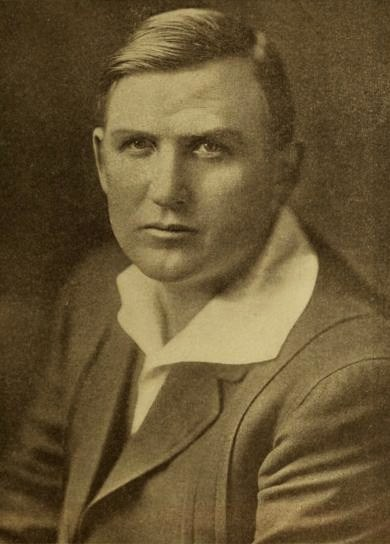
- Clawson in 1917
- Born: Lawrence Dallin Clawson; October 5, 1885; Salt Lake City, Utah, US
- Died: July 18, 1937 (aged 51); Englewood, New Jersey, US
- Other name: Dal Clawson
- Title: A.S.C. founding member
- Relatives: Elliott J. Clawson (brother)

Lawrence Dallin "Dal" Clawson (October 5, 1885 – July 18, 1937) was a cinematographer in the United States who founded the American Society of Cinematographers.

== Biography ==
He was born around October 4, 1885, in Salt Lake City, Utah, to Stanley Clawson and Mary Jones.

His first known feature credits as a cinematographer are for director Lois Weber at Bosworth, Inc., and Universal in 1914–15. This was after graduating from the University of Utah as a mechanical engineer. He also worked for the American Film Company and Ince-Triangle-KayBee, where photographic superintendent and future director Irvin Willat would remember Clawson as “sort of like a news cameraman” who was not especially noted for his lighting style. He also worked around the world, even being decorated by the King of Siam for his work. His book on this adventure was entitled How I Shot the King of Siam.

By the early 1920s, Clawson was chief cinematographer for popular star Anita Stewart at Louis B. Mayer Productions, but later in the decade, he often worked as a second cameraman. He was lead cinematographer on the early talkie Syncopation, but his few remaining published credits are for expedition films such as Hunting Tigers in India (1929) and low-budget East Coast productions such as The Black King and The Horror (both 1932).

A resident of Northvale, New Jersey, Clawson died at a hospital in Englewood, New Jersey, on July 18, 1937, of an intestinal malady. He died within an hour of his own mother's death.

== Cinematographer ==
- The Horror (1932)
- The Black King (1932)
- Devil of the Matterhorn (1932)
- Corianton: A Story of Unholy Love (1931)
- The Love Kiss (1930)
- Love at First Sight (1929)
- Syncopation (1929)
- The Slaver (1927)
- What Price Love? (1927)
- Another Scandal (1924)
- Miami (1924)
- The Lone Wolf (1924)
- The Marriage Chance (1922)
- The World's a Stage (1922)
- Rose o' the Sea (1922)
- The Woman He Married (1922)
- What Do Men Want? (1922)
- The Oath (1921)
- The Corsican Brothers (1920)
- Eve in Exile (1919)
- Bonds of Honor (1919)
- Her Kingdom of Dreams (1919)
- Back to God's Country (1919)
- Forbidden (1919)
- Mary Regan (1919)
- The Courageous Coward (1919)
- A Heart in Pawn (1919)
- A Midnight Romance (1919)
- When a Girl Loves (1919)
- The Temple of Dusk (1918)
- For Husbands Only (1918)
- The Red, Red Heart (1918)
- The Pride of New York (1917)
- This Is the Life (1917)
- The Conqueror (1917)
- Betrayed (1917)
- The Innocent Sinner (1917)
- The Silent Lie (1917)
- One Touch of Sin (1917)
- The Weaker Sex (1917)
- The Female of the Species (1916)
- The Love Thief (1916)
- The Honorable Algy (1916)
- Somewhere in France (1916)
- The Vagabond Prince (1916)
- Honor Thy Name (1916)
- The Phantom (1916)
- The Dumb Girl of Portici (1916)
- The Call of the Cumberlands (1916)
- Civilization (1916)
- The Yankee Girl (1915)
- Scandal (1915)
- The Rosary (1915)
- Captain Courtesy (1915)
- Hypocrites (1915)
- It's No Laughing Matter (1914)
- The Merchant of Venice (1914)
