= In the Heart of a Fool =

1920 film by Allan Dwan

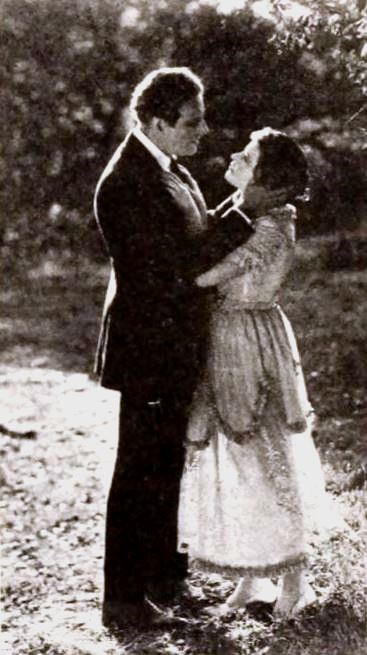
- Film still with James Kirkwood and Mary Thurman
- Directed by: Allan Dwan
- Written by: Lillian Ducey (scenario)
- Based on: In the Heart of a Fool by William Allen White
- Produced by: Allan Dwan
- Starring: James Kirkwood; Anna Q. Nilsson; Mary Thurman
- Cinematography: H. Lyman Broening
- Production company: Mayflower Photoplay Company
- Distributed by: Associated First National Pictures
- Release date: October 1920
- Running time: 6 reels
- Country: United States
- Language: Silent (English intertitles)

In the Heart of a Fool is a 1920 American silent drama film directed by Allan Dwan. It is based on a novel by William Allen White.

== Plot ==
As described in a film magazine, in a small town lives Dr. Harvey Nesbit, who knows of the scandals of the community. His daughter Laura loves Grant Adams, the editor of the local newspaper. Margaret Muller arrives in town to teach at the school and takes lodging at Grant's mother's house. She desires to dethrone Laura as a social leader, and decides to use Grant to obtain her desire. Laura, to arouse Grant's jealousy, flirts with another man, and they quarrel. Laura returns to her boarding school, and when she returns after her term she discovers Margaret as the mother of Grant's illegitimate child. Grant's mother, to shield Margaret's reputation, assumes the parentage of the child. As Dr. Nesbit knows differently, this places a barrier between him and his daughter. Grant's mother dies and with Margaret, in pursuit of Henry Fenn, a young lawyer, refuses to mother her child. Fenn's partner Tom VanDorn marries Laura, and Fenn marries Margaret. Eventually Laura's husband succumbs to Margaret's wiles, their affair leading to the divorce of Fenn and Laura from the guilty couple. Grant quits his paper to become foreman at a coal mine. A terrific explosion happens and, while attempting to rescue his men, Grant is badly injured. He is taken to Dr. Nesbit's home and Laura, tired of VanDorn, arrives at the same time. She nurses him back to health and the fires of love are rekindled. They decide to work to better the condition of the miners, but the issue of Grant's parentage remains a barrier between them. A strike is called and "Hog Tight" Sands, the owner of the mine, engages a horde of strike breakers to run Grant out of town. In the melee VanDorn holds up Grant's little son as a threat to make Grant give himself up, and the child is shot. Margaret then hates VanDorn and kills him, and then goes insane. On the deathbed of the child Grant confesses to Laura that the child is his, admitting this was a barrier between them. They come to an understanding and happiness.

== Cast ==
- James Kirkwood Sr. as Grant Adams
- Anna Q. Nilsson as Margaret Muller
- Mary Thurman as Laura Nesbit
- Philo McCullough as Tom VanDorn
- Ward Crane as Henry Fenn
- Maryland Morne as Violet Mauling
- John Burton as Dr. Harvey Nesbit
- Margaret Campbell as Mrs. Nesbit
- Percy Challenger as Daniel Sands
- Arthur Hoyt as Mortie Sands
- Harold Miller
- Claire Windsor

== Preservation status ==
The film is currently lost.
