= The Dishonored Medal =

1914 silent film directed by Christy Cabanne

- Directed by: Christy Cabanne
- Produced by: D. W. Griffith
- Starring: Miriam Cooper; George Gebhard; Raoul Walsh
- Production company: Reliance Motion Picture Co.
- Distributed by: Mutual Film Corp. Continental Feature Film Corp.
- Release date: May 3, 1914 (US)
- Running time: 4 reels
- Country: United States
- Language: English

The Dishonored Medal is a 1914 silent American adventure film, directed by Christy Cabanne. It stars Miriam Cooper, George Gebhard, and Raoul Walsh, and was released on May 3, 1914.

== Cast list ==
- Miriam Cooper as Zora
- George Gebhard as Lieutenant Dubois
- Raoul Walsh as Adopted Son
- Frank Bennett as Bel Kahn, son of Achmed
- Mabel Van Buren as Anitra
- Dark Cloud as Sheik Achmed

== Production ==
The exterior desert scenes of the film were shot in Arizona.

== Reception ==
The Hartford Courant gave the film a very positive review. They called it a "wonderful" production, and went on to say, "There is little to find fault with in "The Dishonored Medal" and much that is worthy of high praise."
