= The Witch's Tale =

1930s American horror-fantasy radio series

Old Nancy (Adelaide Fitz-Allen) watches as a sinister Alonzo Deen Cole frightens his wife, Marie O'Flynn, in this early 1930s posed publicity photo for The Witch's Tale.

The Witch's Tale is a horror-fantasy radio series which aired from May 21, 1931, to June 13, 1938, on WOR, the Mutual Radio Network, and in syndication. The program was created, written, and directed by Alonzo Deen Cole (February 22, 1897, St. Paul, Minnesota - April 7, 1971).

== Production and casting ==
The first horror drama on radio, Cole's spooky show was hosted by Old Nancy, the Witch of Salem, who introduced a different terror tale each week. The role of Old Nancy was created by stage actress Adelaide Fitz-Allen, who died in 1935 at the age of 79. Cole replaced her with 13-year-old Miriam Wolfe, and Martha Wentworth was also heard as Old Nancy on occasion. Cole himself provided the sounds of Old Nancy's cat, Satan. Cole's wife, Marie O'Flynn, portrayed the lead female characters on the program, and the supporting cast included Mark Smith and Alan Devitte.

The majority of the scripts were original stories, but there were literary adaptations as well, including:

- 1931: "The Bronze Venus," adapted from La Vénus d'Ille by Prosper Mérimée.
- 1932: "In the Devil's Name," adapted from the confessions of supposed real-life witch Isobel Gowdie. (Only the first half of this episode has survived.)
- 1934: "The Wonderful Bottle," adapted from The Bottle Imp by Robert Louis Stevenson.
- 1934: "The Flying Dutchman," based on the legend of the ghost ship The Flying Dutchman.
- 1935: an adaptation of Frankenstein by Mary Shelley.

There were likely other adaptations that have not survived.

For syndication, the shows were recorded live during broadcast and distributed to other stations. These recordings were destroyed by Cole in 1961, so few episodes survive. Cole was also the writer, producer, and director of the radio mystery-crime drama, Casey, Crime Photographer.

In November 1936, Alonzo Deen Cole edited The Witch's Tales magazine with the lead story by Cole. It ran for only two issues.

== Television ==
An effort was made to bring the series to television. In 1958, Television Programs of America made plans to film a pilot with Cole as consultant and story supervisor. The associate story editor was Raymond Levy. However, the show never made it to TV.

== Influence ==
EC Comics' publisher Bill Gaines was inspired by Cole's Old Nancy host to create the character the Old Witch, illustrated by Graham Ingels as the host of EC's The Haunt of Fear.

== See also ==
- Lights Out
