= The Oath (1921 American film) =

1921 silent film

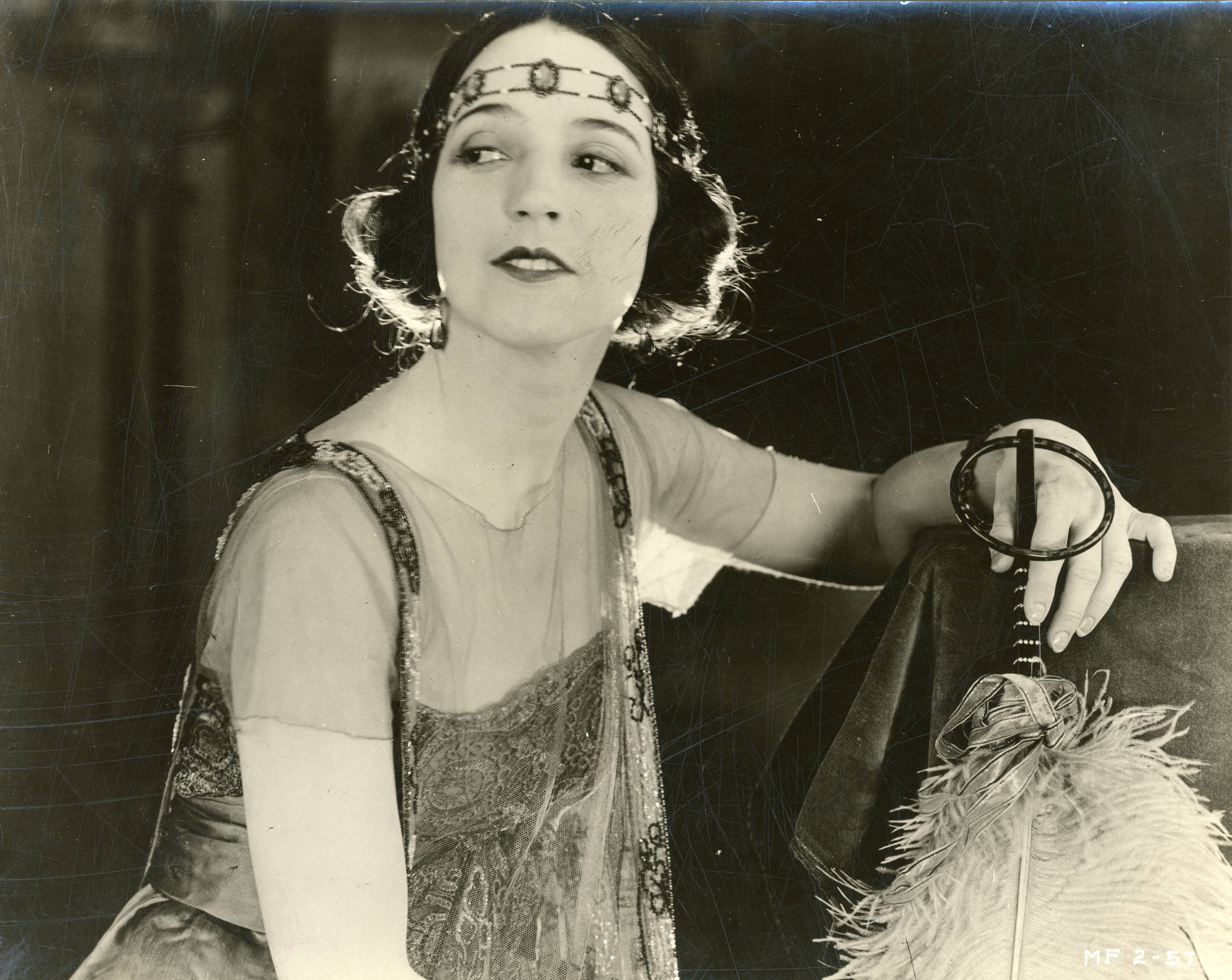
- Directed by: Raoul Walsh
- Written by: Ralph Spence
- Based on: Idols by William John Locke
- Produced by: Raoul Walsh
- Starring: Miriam Cooper; Robert Fischer; Conway Tearle
- Cinematography: Dal Clawson; G.O. Post
- Production company: Mayflower Photoplay Company
- Distributed by: First National Pictures
- Release date: April 10, 1921
- Running time: 80 minutes
- Country: United States
- Languages: Silent; English intertitles

The Oath is a 1921 American silent drama film directed by Raoul Walsh and starring Miriam Cooper, Robert Fischer and Conway Tearle. The film's sets were designed by the art director William Cameron Menzies. It is based on the 1911 novel Idols by the British writer William John Locke.

== Cast ==
- Miriam Cooper as Minna Hart
- Robert Fischer as Israel Hart
- Conway Tearle as Hugh Coleman
- Henry Clive as Gerard Merriam
- Ricca Allen as Anna Cassaba
- Anna Q. Nilsson as Irene Lansing

== Bibliography ==
- Munden, Kenneth White. The American Film Institute Catalog of Motion Pictures Produced in the United States, Part 1. University of California Press, 1997.
