= Miriam Cooper =

American actress (1891-1976)

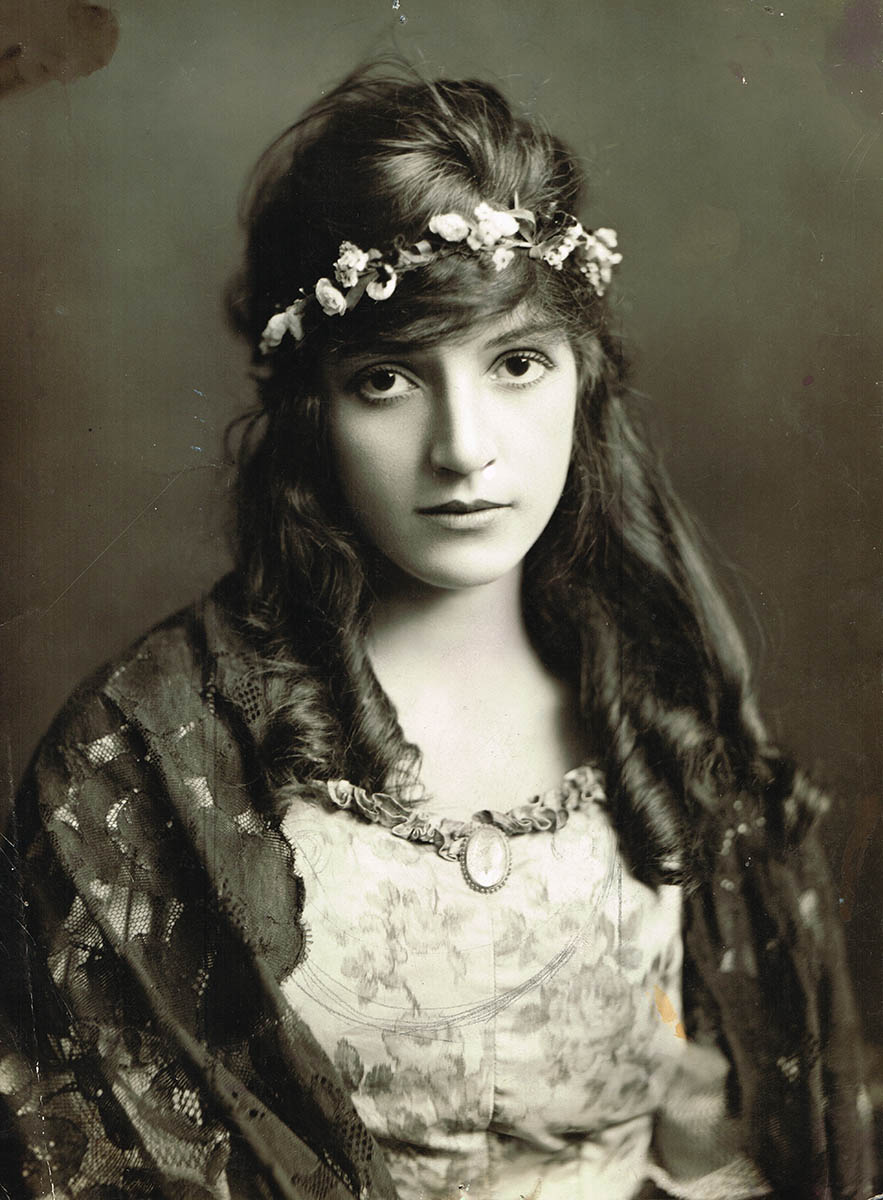
- Stars of the Photoplay, 1916
- Born: Marian Cooper; November 7, 1891; Baltimore, Maryland, U.S.
- Died: April 12, 1976 (aged 84); Charlottesville, Virginia, U.S.
- Resting place: New Cathedral Cemetery, Baltimore
- Occupations: Actress, writer, speaker
- Years active: 1910–1924
- Spouse: Raoul Walsh (m. 1916; div. 1926)

Miriam Cooper (born Marian Cooper; November 7, 1891 – April 12, 1976), also credited Marion Cooper, was an American silent film actress who is best known for her work in early film including The Birth of a Nation and Intolerance for D. W. Griffith and The Honor System and Evangeline for her husband Raoul Walsh. She retired from acting in 1924 but was rediscovered by the film community in the 1960s, and toured colleges lecturing about silent films.

== Early life ==
Miriam Cooper was born to Julian James Cooper and Margaret Stewart Cooper in Baltimore, Maryland on November 7, 1891. Her mother was from a devout Catholic family with a long history in Baltimore. Her paternal grandfather had helped discover Navassa Island and made his wealth from selling guano. Her father was attending Loyola University when he met her mother. Her parents had five children in five years (one died in infancy) including her sister Lenore and her brothers Nelson and Gordon.

When Miriam was young, her father abandoned the family and went to Europe. Until that point the family had lived comfortably in Washington Heights, but Julian Cooper kept the inheritance, leaving the family destitute. They moved to Little Italy, which Cooper despised. Cooper had a troubled relationship with her mother, whom Cooper loved but felt was cold to her. Once during her childhood her mother told her she hated Miriam for looking like her (Miriam's) father. Her mother remarried in 1914.

During this time, Cooper found solace by playing in an abandoned Dutch cemetery. She would lie on the graves and daydream. To make her sister Lenore behave, she also became a storyteller, repeating Edgar Allan Poe's poem "The Raven" and saying it was named for her. Cooper cited these experiences as great influences both on her acting and on her Christian faith.

Never intending to be an actress, Cooper originally had trained to be a painter. She attended St. Walpurga's School with the help of the nuns, who arranged her tuition. From there she attended art school at New York's Cooper Union, again with help from the parish. At the suggestion of a friend of her mother's, Cooper posed for Charles Dana Gibson at the age of 21. It was the first painting Gibson had done in oils.

Soon after, on a friend's suggestion, Cooper went to Biograph Studios, just to see what they were doing there. Cooper had only seen one flicker behind her mother's back and hadn't been impressed with it. Able to walk right up to the set, the two girls watched the filming of part of "A Blot on The 'Scutcheon", being directed by D. W. Griffith. One of the assistants, Christy Cabanne, approached them and asked if they would like to be extras. They were given the choice of 'page boy' or 'scullery maid'. Cooper did not want to wear slacks, so she chose 'scullery maid'. Her friend backed out, but Cooper stayed for the $5 a day pay. Ford Sterling's wife Teddy Sampson tried to sabotage Cooper's make up, but Mack Sennett and Mabel Normand spotted her and helped her. After shooting, Cooper was asked to stay in costume as Griffith wanted to screen test her.

== Kalem Company ==
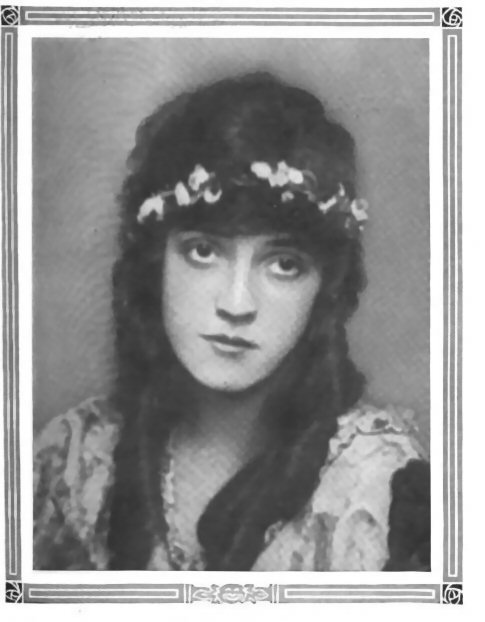
Photoplay Magazine, 1915

Cooper never heard back from Biograph and, interested in making more money, she approached Edison Studios and Vitagraph, but was turned away. In 1912 Kalem Company hired her and used her as an extra. As her roles grew she was invited to join their stock performance company, which was heading for Florida to film. Cooper was offered $35 a week plus expenses. She was initially hesitant to confess her career to her family but changed her mind when she returned home to find they had been given hand-me-downs from a very large, recently deceased, aunt. Deciding she could no longer live that way, Cooper announced her plans, much to her mother's despair.

Filming took place in Jacksonville, Florida with Anna Q. Nilsson and Guy Coombs as the leads. For the 50th anniversary of the American Civil War, the company made several Civil War-themed shorts. For these films, Cooper learned to play drums and ride horseback. She was already able to swim, and these skills were used in several of her shorts.

As time passed Cooper's roles grew in size and she received favorable reviews. Feeling her roles were as big as Nilsson's (who was making $65 a week) and much more dangerous, she requested a raise. They fired her that weekend and she returned to New York and to art school at Cooper Union.

== D. W. Griffith years ==
After returning to New York, Cooper decided once again to try D. W. Griffith. She went to the Biograph offices every day for a week but no one took notice of her. While leaving school one day, she ran again into Christy Cabanne, who had helped her on her first day as an extra. He was excited to have found her as Griffith had been looking for her but since she did not have a telephone number they had been unable to find her. Her first day back at Biograph, Griffith called her into his office five times, but sent her away each time. The final time he asked her to rehearse a scene with Bobby Harron, telling her Bobby was playing her sweetheart, a Confederate soldier going off to war. Pleased with what he'd seen, Griffith told her they would leave for California, where he would make a picture about the Civil War. She would make $35 a week.

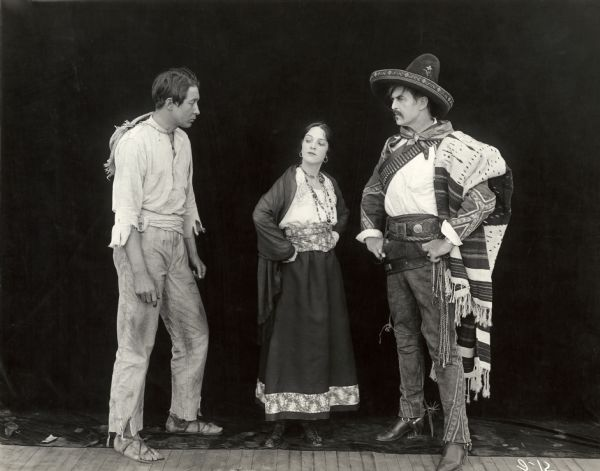
Film still (left to right) of Monte Blue, Cooper, and Hobart Bosworth in costume for Betrayed (1917)

Cooper began work on several pictures for Reliance Majestic, which were made under Griffith's supervision, and began preparations for The Birth of a Nation. She stated she didn't remember being in several films as she was never told which scenes she played ended up in which picture. During this time she acted in one of Griffith's first attempts at a feature, Home, Sweet Home (1914), although she also didn't remember anything about that film.

After working several months for the company, Cooper's star was rising and she was given a star dressing room with Mae Marsh. She couldn't recall the start of The Birth of a Nation other than Griffith announced he was making his Civil War picture, and they still did not use scripts. Cooper was given one of the leading roles as the eldest Southern daughter Margaret Cameron. As was standard at the time, Cooper did her own makeup and hair.

Cooper lived the role and found her only truly difficult scene came acting opposite Henry B. Walthall, whom she found cold and difficult. After having troubles in rehearsal with the scene, she also had trouble while filming. To get her to act upset in the scene Griffith took her aside and told her that her mother had died. Despite the trick, Cooper was never angry with him for it. Cooper's sister Lenore visited her while filming and ended up as an extra playing Lillian Gish's maid in blackface. While having trouble funding the film, Griffith offered Cooper a chance to invest in it, but Cooper had no money. Had she invested, Cooper would have made thousands back.

Cooper was too ill to see the picture when it premiered in Los Angeles. She finally was able to see it in April 1915, in New York. On the advice of Norma Talmadge, she asked to get her family in for free, which the theater allowed. Although she acknowledged the picture's racist tones, Cooper never denounced it. She attended several revival screenings of it in her later years and stated that she was very glad her legacy would be that of a young girl on screen in the film.

Cooper was then given the role of 'The Friendless One' in Intolerance. Cooper noted she played 'a fallen woman' not a 'prostitute', as some sources claimed. During the filming of the scene where 'The Friendless One' is conflicted with inner torment, a photographer from The New York Times took pictures while Cooper acted. Stills were usually taken after scenes had been filmed. This was the first time they were taken during the actual filming. While Griffith finished Intolerance, Cooper worked on a handful of shorts under other directors for Reliance Majestic. These were her final shorts.

In late 1915 Cooper began traveling between New York and California to spend more time with Raoul Walsh. The couple secretly married in February 1916, before Cooper returned to California.

Cooper noted Griffith seemed to treat her differently from other actresses by continually giving her bigger parts (Griffith was known for casting an actress as a lead one day and a bit role the next to keep egos in check). After returning to California, Griffith called Cooper into his office and gave her a leather bound copy of Rubaiyat of Omar Khayyam telling her it was his next picture and he wanted her to play lead. Cooper was already tired of being separated from Walsh and after consulting with Mary Alden, decided she didn't understand what the book was about and didn't want to make a picture out of it. Cooper quietly returned to New York and wired Griffith that she was leaving the company. Griffith wired back his congratulations; it was the last time they ever spoke.

== Raoul Walsh years ==
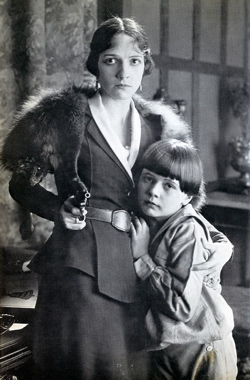
Still from The Woman and the Law (1918)

After leaving Griffith, Cooper received offers from Jesse Lasky and Cecil B. DeMille, but intended to retire and be a housewife and mother. When Walsh was offered a chance to direct a film titled The Honor System in Yuma, Arizona he pleaded with Cooper to take a role in it. Cooper agreed for fear he would cheat on her if they were separated for the long filming period. Cooper made $1,000 a week for her role as Edith. Years later, while being interviewed by Kevin Brownlow, Cooper found Walsh's shooting script for the film on the back of an envelope.

The Honor System opened in 1917 to good reviews (one calling it "Bigger than The Birth of a Nation") and good box office. Two years later it was played for the Prince of Wales when he visited New York.

Walsh continued to ask Cooper's advice when dealing with the business moguls, usually asking her to speak with them as she had done before with Griffith. After filming another film, Walsh once again asked Cooper to 'temporarily return' to pictures until he was established. Cooper signed with Fox Film Corporation and made $1,200 a week. Her contract allowed Walsh to get top billing instead of her—traditionally, it was either the director or the star.

In 1917, Cooper and Walsh began work on a film based on the Blanca de Saulles trial. Cooper bore such a resemblance to De Saulles that Fox wanted to leave her name off the credits to insinuate De Saulles had played herself. Cooper refused. The film was also notable for featuring Peggy Hopkins Joyce as a courtesan, though she didn't realize it until the film premiered. The film was controversial and received what amounted to an X rating for its time, as no children were allowed. The film is now considered a lost film.

After work on The Prussian Cur, Cooper and Walsh adopted a boy named Jack, who was orphaned after the Halifax explosion, and tried to return to a private life, shunning publicity. However, in 1919, as Walsh began to look for new script ideas, Cooper suggested the story Evangeline, in which Walsh asked her to lead. Cooper refused until the studio sent a blonde to play the part. Walsh was annoyed and asked her once again, and she relented. Cooper didn't like the picture as she thought it was too innocent, though it performed well at the box office and was one of her better-known films. Producer William Fox thought it was the best picture of her career. It is also now considered a lost film.

With the success of Evangeline, another film, Should a Husband Forgive? was rushed into theaters. Walsh was excited with the success and wired Cooper that he would make her a big star, though she still wished to retire. Walsh signed with the Mayflower Corporation in 1920. Cooper joined him for the sake of her marriage, fearing more bouts of jealousy if she didn't. Their first film was The Deep Purple.

Their next film was The Oath (1920), of which Cooper took control from casting to costumes. Cooper said she loved everything about the film, however, it received the worst reviews of her career and was one of Walsh's only silents to lose money. Cooper was deeply hurt by the failure. Their next film, Serenade, was fully under Walsh's control and was their most profitable. However, Cooper hated acting opposite Walsh's brother George, who she felt was stiff. Walsh agreed and they were never paired together again.

The duo's final film together was Kindred of the Dust. Cooper felt it was mediocre but it did decent business. During filming, she accidentally gazed into a stage light, causing injury to her eyes that troubled her well into old age. Kindred of the Dust was the last film the couple did together, the last independent film for Walsh, and is one of Cooper's few surviving films.

== Final films ==
As troubles in her marriage and finances began to appear, Cooper found she resented the role of 'The Director's Wife'. On the advice of a friend, she took to the stage for the first and only time, but received disastrous reviews. Cooper decided she didn't like stage acting and began considering film offers again.

A little film company called 'D. M. Film Corporation' offered her a role in a pictured title Is Money Everything?. It only offered $650 a week and would film in Detroit, but Cooper took the part, anyway, for the money. The movie received horrible reviews, and she found herself overwhelmed again by her personal troubles.

After reconciling with Walsh, Cooper decided to keep working in films. Her first film back in Hollywood was for B. P. Schulberg was The Girl Who Came Back (1923), making $1,000 a week. The picture did well and was hailed as a comeback. Schulberg asked her to make two more pictures for him, and she agreed. She also made two films for other companies. Cooper's final picture was The Broken Wing, alongside her old friend Walter Long.

Cooper was terrified of sitting in an airplane (a main plot point) and refused. She also found the director Tom Forman to be a drunk, and was upset that, at her final big scene, he turned up too drunk to direct. When the picture premiered Cooper cried after viewing it, feeling it was the worst movie she'd ever seen. She wrote "After The Broken Wing, I never wanted to make another picture. After all the times I thought I'd retire for good and then came back to films, I finally wound up my career in a stinker made by a drunk. What a hell of an ending."

== Later years ==
After divorcing Walsh in 1926, Cooper never made another picture. She returned to New York and joined high society playing bridge and shopping. During World War II, Cooper volunteered for Red Cross, handing out doughnuts and writing letters for wounded soldiers. She attended Columbia University in the 1940s to study writing. She bought a farm in Chestertown, Maryland, hoping to be inspired. She wrote a novel and two plays, all of which went unpublished. The plays were based on two of her films and she sent them to FOX, but both were rejected. In the 1950s she moved to Virginia where she started a women's writing club. She continued playing golf, working for charity, and playing bridge.

In 1969, a man from the Library of Congress called her, surprised to find she was still alive. Soon after, she began receiving calls from universities and film historians. She was invited to several colleges and screenings of her old films. In 1973 she wrote an autobiography, Dark Lady of the Silents.

In 1970 after attending "The D. W. Griffith Film Festival" she had a heart attack which began a series of heart troubles which limited her in her final years.

Cooper died at Cedars Nursing Home on April 12, 1976. She had been there since suffering a stroke earlier the same year. Her death left Lillian Gish as the sole surviving cast member of The Birth of a Nation. She is buried in the New Cathedral Cemetery in Baltimore, Maryland. Her papers were donated to the Library of Congress.

== Legacy ==
Cooper is primarily known today for her performances in The Birth of a Nation and Intolerance. Very few of her films are known to survive. Only 3 of her 40 shorts still exist, while only 5 of her 21 features still exist. Her only non-Griffith features to survive are Kindred of the Dust (1922) and Is Money Everything? (1923).

== Personal life ==
Cooper got along well with D. W. Griffith, saying he had been a perfect gentleman. However, when they first arrived in California, Cooper mistook his mannerisms as insulting (he had failed to return a hello to her one day). She complained to Mae Marsh, who was also trying to win Griffith's favor, and Marsh told Griffith. The next day on set, Griffith called Cooper "The Queen of Sheba". They worked out the misunderstanding but she recalled that, much to her annoyance, the nickname stuck for years afterwards. She claimed to have never been romantic with Griffith, like Lillian Gish or Mae Marsh. However, she did mention in her autobiography that he tried to kiss her once after offering her a ride home. After the release of "The Birth of a Nation", Cooper's train stopped in Chicago, where Griffith was staying. He sent her a telegram asking her to see him in his hotel room but Cooper was unable to reach him. According to her, this stopped his romantic intentions with her. Though aware of Griffith's struggles later in life, she hadn't seen him since leaving for New York in 1916; she did visit his grave during her visit to Kentucky for "The D.W. Griffith Film Festival".

Cooper got along well with most of Griffith's company including Dorothy Gish, Mary Alden, and Mae Marsh. She also was friends with Norma Talmadge, Mabel Normand, and Pola Negri. Though they were not close, she was fond of Lillian Gish. Cooper didn't get along with Teddy Sampson and she greatly disliked Theda Bara, who she felt was trying to steal Raoul Walsh away from her during the making of Carmen and The Serpent. In later years Cooper was good friends with Carole Lombard, whom she helped get some of her first roles. Cooper and Walsh were good friends with Charlie Chaplin in 1924. Chaplin was going through some troubling times and she found him gloomy and needy. She enjoyed him more once his personal life was back in order and he was much more cheery.

Cooper met Raoul Walsh in 1914 when she joined Griffith's California Company. After Mae Marsh turned Walsh down for an Easter Mass date Walsh and Cooper began dating in 1915. Walsh had been Griffith's assistant director and asked Cooper if she would speak to Griffith about making him a director. On her advice Griffith made him a director a few weeks later. After directing one picture for Griffith, Walsh was signed to Fox Studios which filmed in New York while Cooper still had to film in California. The couple married in February 1916 and Cooper left the Griffith company to join Walsh in New York. Cooper intended to quit pictures to be a housewife and mother, but Walsh's gambling and cheating were big problems for her. One of the first nights she suspected him of cheating, she swallowed a bottle of carbolic acid and had to have her stomach pumped. However, Walsh continued to cheat during the marriage. As their successes grew, more trouble arose from debts and Cooper's resentment at being known as the Director's wife, something she was surprised at as she had thought she never wanted the spotlight.

After Kindred of the Dust, Walsh admitted he didn't think he loved her anymore. The marriage dragged on as both sides accused the other of cheating. Though they reconciled by 1925, Cooper was certain he was again cheating, this time with Ethel Barrymore, whom she confronted. Afterward, she threatened to divorce him. Walsh pleaded for forgiveness but Cooper found he was cheating with a young society girl who he was engaged to. The final moment came when Walsh began an affair with Cooper's friend Lorraine Miller. Cooper was furious and began divorce proceedings, threatening to put infidelity as her reason. However, in the days of morality clauses, this could have caused Walsh to lose his contract and William Fox talked her out of it. Instead she put 'irreconcilable differences'. The divorce was big news in Hollywood, with Gloria Swanson throwing Walsh a party, while Norman Kerry and Erich von Stroheim threw Cooper one. Not too long after, Walsh married Miller.

Cooper desperately wanted children but was unable to conceive. Though she never learned the reason, she suspected it had to do with her kidney illness. She and Walsh adopted two boys: Jackie and Bobbie. After the divorce, both boys lived with her until their teenage years. Jackie got in trouble with the law several times, and Bobbie idolized him. At the advice of her preacher, Cooper sent Jackie to live with Walsh. On a visit, Bobbie asked to live there as well. Cooper and Walsh had been suing each other during the 1930s and Walsh later had the boys sue her as well. Cooper never heard from either of her sons again and was unsure if they were still alive as of the 1970s.

Her nieces are sisters Olympic swimmer and gold medal winner Donna de Varona, and television actress Joanna Kerns.

== Partial filmography ==
Films in bold still exist

1912:

- **A Blot on the 'Scutcheon** (Short) as Scullery Maid
- Battle of Pottsburg Bridge (Short) as Jessie - Bartlow's Sister
- Victim of Circumstances (Short)
- **Tide of Battle** (Short) as Mystie Stafford - Alisia's Sister
- War's Havoc (Short)
- The Drummer Girl of Vicksburg (Short) as Alma - the Drummer Girl
- The Colonel's Escape (Short)
- The Buglier of Battery B (Short) as Carol Colwell
- The Siege of Petersburg (Short) as Milly Frost - Dan's sister
- The Soldier Brothers of Susannah (Short)
- Saved from Court Martial (Short) as Undine
- The Darling of the CSA (Short) as Minor Role (unconfirmed)
- **The Confederate Ironclad** (Short) as Rose Calvin - Yancey's Sweetheart
- A Railroad Lochinvar (Short) as Peggy Wolf
- His Mother's Picture (Short) as Ethel
- The Girl in the Caboose (Short) as Eve - the Engineer's Sweetheart
- The Pony Express Girl (Short)
- Battle in the Virginia Hills (Short) as Nancy Tucker - Jerry's Daughter
- The Water Right War (Short)
- The Battle Wits (Short)
- A Race with Time (Short)
- The Farm Bully (Short)
- **The Toll Gate Raiders** (Short)

1913:

- A Sawmill Hazard (Short)
- A Desperate Chance (Short)
- A Treacherous Shot (Short) as Delphine Erskine
- The Turning Point (Short) as Stella Lee - the Wife
- The Battle of Bloody Ford (Short) as Virginia Merrill
- Infamous Don Miguel (Short) as Dixie Hardie
- Captured by Strategy (Short) as Gladys Richmond - John's Daughter
- The Octoroon (Short) as Dora Sunnyside

1914:

- For His Master (Short) as Rosalie Crowley
- When Fate Frowned (Short) as Mary
- A Diamond in the Rough (Short) as Grace
- The Dishonored Medal as Zora
- **Home Sweet Home** as The Fiance
- The Stolen Radium (Short)
- The Gunman (Short) as Mattie - the Rancher's Sister
- The Odalisque (Short) as Annie, May's Friend

1915:

- The Double Deception (Short) as Laura - the Young Woman
- **The Birth of a Nation** as Margaret Cameron - Elder Sister
- The Fatal Black Bean (Short) as Anita
- His Return (Short) as Alice
- The Burned Hand (Short) as Marietta

1916:

- **Intolerance** as The Friendless One

1917:

- The Honor System as Edith
- The Silent Lie as Lady Lou
- The Innocent Sinner as Mary Ellen Ellis
- Betrayed as Carmelita

1918:

- The Woman and the Law as Mrs. Jack La Salle
- The Prussian Cur as Rosie O'Grady

1919:

- The Mother and the Law as The Friendless One
- Evangeline as Evangeline
- Should a Husband Forgive? as Ruth Fulton

1920:

- The Deep Purple as Doris Moore
- The Oath as Minna Hart

1921:

- Serenade as Maria del Carmen

1922:

- **Kindred of the Dust** as Nan of the Sawdust Pile

1923:

- The Hero as Martha Baker
- **Is Money Everything?** as Marion Brand
- The Girl Who Came Back as Sheila
- Her Accidental Husband as Rena Goring
- Daughters of the Rich as Maud Barhyte
- The Broken Wing as Inez Villera

1924:

- After the Ball as Lorraine Trevelyan (final film role)

== Bibliography ==
- Miriam Cooper, Dark Lady of the Silents; My Life in Early Hollywood, Bobbs-Merrill (1973). ISBN 0-672-51725-6.
