= Raoul Walsh =

American film director and actor (1887–1980)

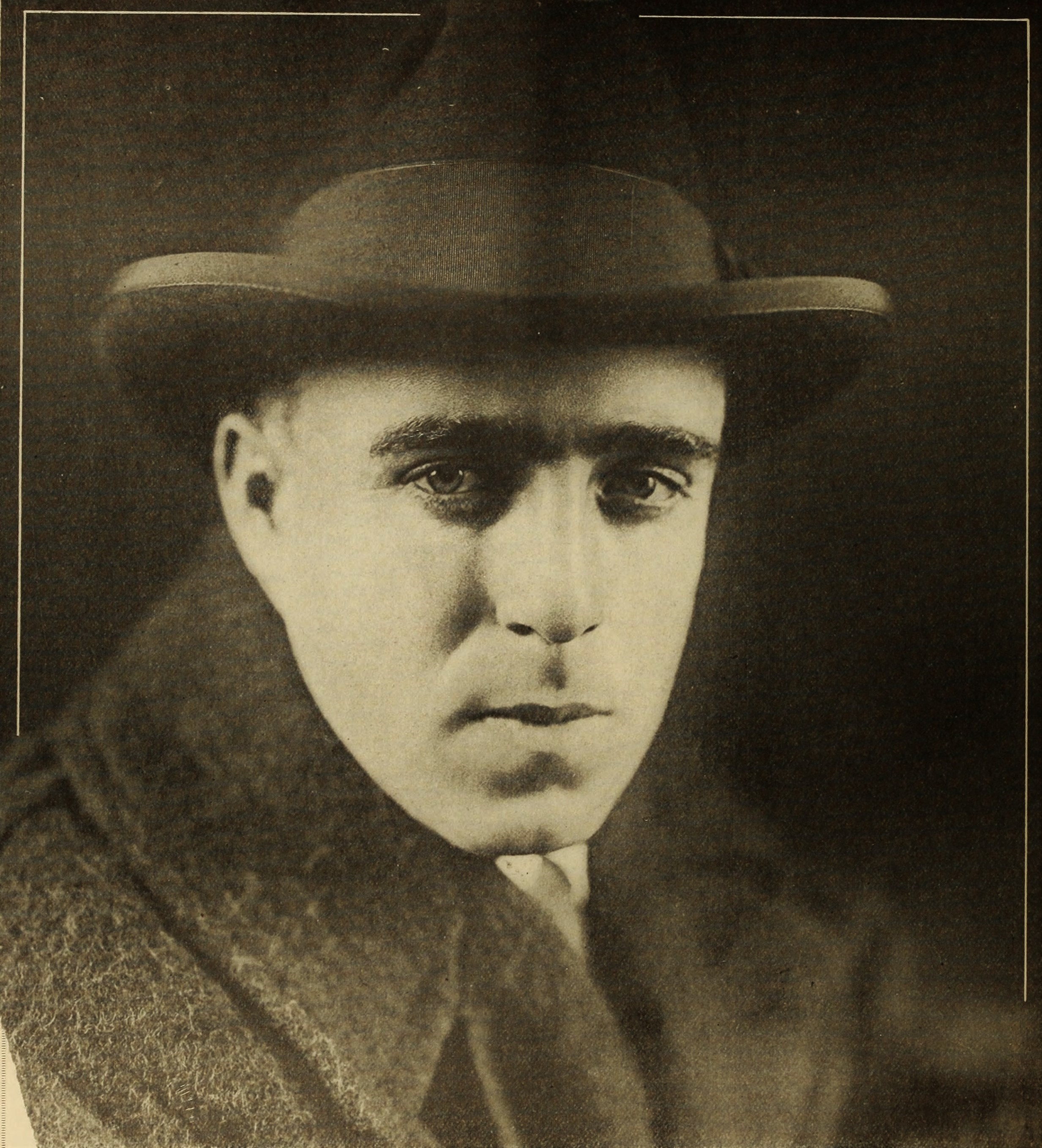
- Walsh, c. 1918
- Born: Albert Edward Walsh; March 11, 1887; New York City, U.S.
- Died: December 31, 1980 (aged 93); Simi Valley, California, U.S.
- Resting place: Assumption Catholic Cemetery, Simi Valley, Ventura County, California
- Occupations: Film director; actor
- Years active: 1909–1964
- Spouses: Miriam Cooper (m. 1916; div. 1926) Lorraine Miller (m. 1928; div. 1947) Mary Simpson (m. 1947)
- Relatives: George Walsh (brother)
- Awards: Founding member of the Academy of Motion Picture Arts and Sciences

Raoul Walsh (born Albert Edward Walsh; March 11, 1887 – December 31, 1980) was an American film director, actor, founding member of the Academy of Motion Picture Arts and Sciences (AMPAS), and the brother of silent cinema actor George Walsh. He portrayed John Wilkes Booth in the silent film The Birth of a Nation (1915). He directed numerous films: the widescreen epic The Big Trail (1930), starring John Wayne in his first leading role; The Roaring Twenties starring James Cagney, Gladys George, Priscilla Lane and Humphrey Bogart; High Sierra (1941) starring Ida Lupino and Humphrey Bogart; and White Heat (1949) starring James Cagney, Edmond O'Brien, Virginia Mayo and Margaret Wycherly. He directed his last film in 1964. His work has been noted as influencing such directors as Rainer Werner Fassbinder and Martin Scorsese.

== Early life ==
Walsh was born in New York as Albert Edward Walsh to Elizabeth T. Bruff, the daughter of Irish Catholic immigrants, and Thomas W. Walsh, an Englishman. Walsh was part of Omega Gamma Delta in high school, as was his younger brother. Growing up in New York, Walsh was also a friend of the Barrymore family. John Barrymore recalled spending time reading in the Walsh family library as a youth.

After Walsh's mother died, the youth left home when he was fifteen years old and traveled through Texas, Montana and Cuba, also working in Mexico as a cowboy. Later in life, Walsh lived in Palm Springs, California. He was buried at Assumption Cemetery Simi Valley, Ventura County, California.

== Film career ==
After returning to New York, Walsh was educated at Seton Hall College. He began acting in 1909, first as a stage actor in New York City and later as a film actor. In 1913 he changed his name to Raoul Walsh. In 1914 he became an assistant to director D. W. Griffith and made his first full-length feature film as an actor, The Life of General Villa. It was shot on location in Mexico with Pancho Villa playing the lead. Ongoing battles were filmed in progress as well as battle recreations. Walsh played Villa as a younger man.

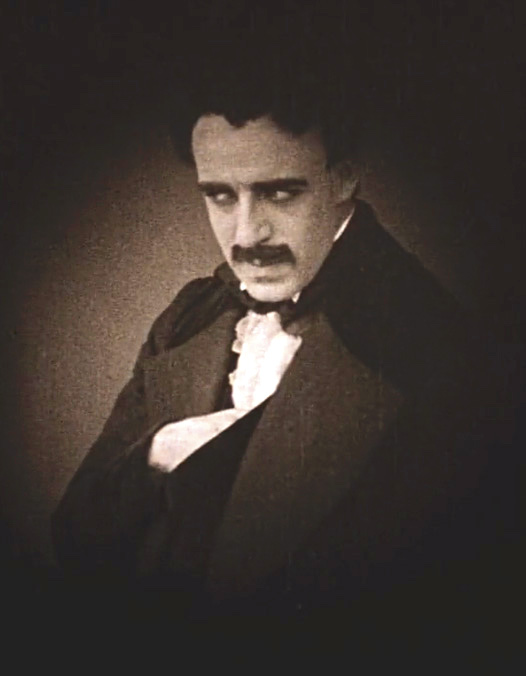
Walsh as John Wilkes Booth

Walsh played John Wilkes Booth in Griffith's epic The Birth of a Nation (1915) and also served as an assistant director. His next performance was in the critically acclaimed Regeneration in 1915, the earliest feature gangster film. It was shot on location in Manhattan's Bowery district.

Walsh served during World War I as an officer in the United States Army. Years later he directed the fantasy film The Thief of Bagdad (1924), starring Douglas Fairbanks and Anna May Wong, and Laurence Stallings' What Price Glory? (1926), starring Victor McLaglen and Dolores del Río.

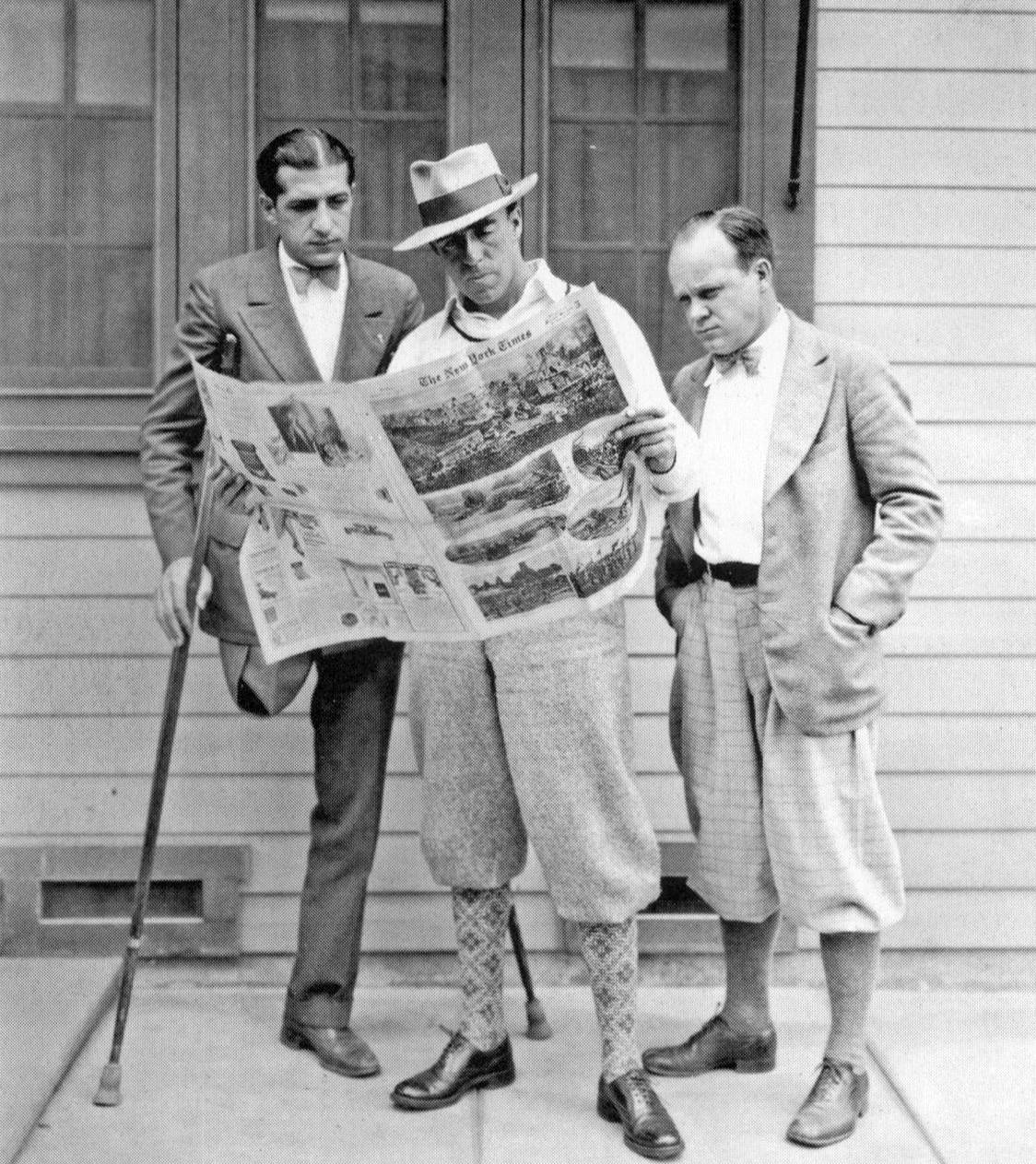
Stallings (left) and Walsh (center), c. 1926

In Sadie Thompson (1928), starring Gloria Swanson as a prostitute seeking a new life in Samoa, Walsh starred as Swanson's boyfriend. It was his first acting role since 1915, and he also directed the film. He was next hired to direct and star in In Old Arizona, a film about O. Henry's character the Cisco Kid.

While on location for that film, Walsh was in a car crash when a jackrabbit jumped through the windshield as he was driving through the desert. He lost his right eye as a result and wore an eyepatch for the rest of his life. He gave up the role and never acted again. Warner Baxter won an Oscar for the role Walsh was originally slated to play.

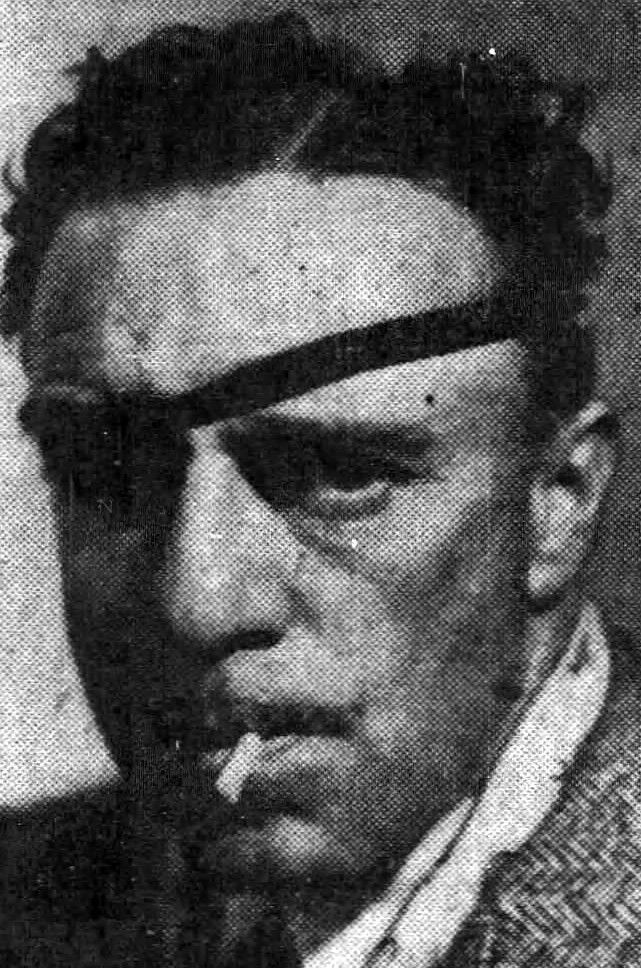
Walsh wearing an eyepatch, c. 1946

In the early days of sound with Fox, Walsh directed the first widescreen spectacle, The Big Trail (1930), an epic wagon train western shot on location across the West. The movie starred John Wayne, then unknown, whom Walsh had discovered as a prop man named Marion Morrison. He was renamed after Revolutionary War general Mad Anthony Wayne; Walsh happened to be reading a book about him at the time. Walsh directed The Bowery (1933), featuring Wallace Beery, George Raft, Fay Wray and Pert Kelton. The energetic movie recounts the story of Steve Brodie (Raft), supposedly the first man to jump off the Brooklyn Bridge and live to brag about it.

An undistinguished period followed with Paramount Pictures from 1935 to 1939, but Walsh's career rose to new heights after he moved to Warner Brothers. He directed with The Roaring Twenties (1939), featuring James Cagney and Humphrey Bogart; Dark Command (1940), with John Wayne and Roy Rogers (at Republic Pictures); They Drive By Night (1940), with George Raft, Ann Sheridan, Ida Lupino and Bogart; High Sierra (1941), with Lupino and Bogart again; They Died with Their Boots On (1941), with Errol Flynn as Custer; The Strawberry Blonde (1941), with Cagney and Olivia de Havilland; Manpower (1941), with Edward G. Robinson, Marlene Dietrich and George Raft; and White Heat (1949), with Cagney. Walsh's contract at Warners expired in 1953.

He directed several films afterwards, including three with Clark Gable: The Tall Men (1955), The King and Four Queens (1956) and Band of Angels (1957). After helping create the story for None but the Brave (released in 1965) and directing A Distant Trumpet, Walsh retired in 1964. He died of a heart attack in 1980.

== Outside interests ==
Raoul Walsh was a breeder and owner of Thoroughbred racehorses. For a time, his brother George Walsh trained his stable of horses. Their horse Sunset Trail competed in the 1937 Kentucky Derby won by War Admiral who went on to win the U.S. Triple Crown. Sunset Trail finished sixteenth in a field of twenty runners.

Some of Walsh's film-related material and personal papers are contained in the Wesleyan University Cinema Archives.

Like many filmmakers of his generation, he was a lifelong supporter of the Republican Party but coupled that with “true tolerance of anyone around him without regard to race or social status."

== Selected filmography ==
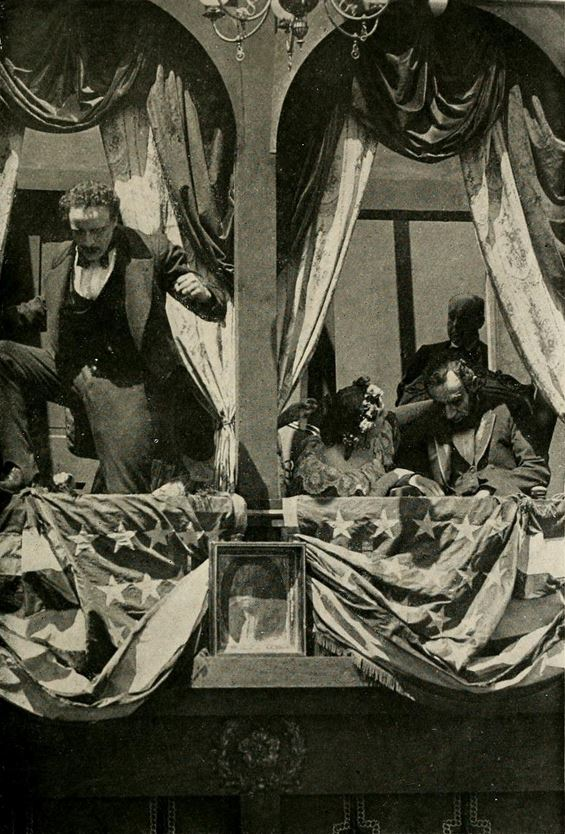
Walsh as John Wilkes Booth in The Birth of a Nation, 1915

- The Pseudo Prodigal (1913 short, director, directorial debut)
- The Mystery of the Hindu Image (1914, director, uncredited), extant
- The Banker's Daughter (1914)
- The Great Leap; Until Death Do Us Part (1914)
- The Dishonored Medal (1914) – The Adopted Son
- The Life of General Villa (1914) – Villa as a young man
- The Old Fisherman's Story (1914) - Ben
- The Birth of a Nation (1915) – John Wilkes Booth (uncredited)
- Regeneration (1915, director)
- Carmen (1915, director)
- The Outlaw's Revenge (1915) – The outlaw
- Blue Blood and Red (1916, director)
- The Silent Lie (1917, a.k.a. Camille of the Yukon, director)
- Betrayed (1917, director)
- The Conqueror (1917, director)
- The Innocent Sinner (1917, director)
- The Honor System (1917, director)
- On the Jump (1918, director)
- The Woman and the Law (1918, director)
- The Prussian Cur (1918, director)
- Evangeline (1919, director, with his wife Miriam Cooper)
- The Strongest (1920, director)
- The Deep Purple (1920, director)
- The Oath (1921, director)
- Kindred of the Dust (1922, director)
- The Thief of Bagdad (1924, director, produced by and starring Douglas Fairbanks)
- The Wanderer (1925, director)
- What Price Glory (1926, director, his most successful silent movie)
- The Lucky Lady (1926, director)
- The Loves of Carmen (1927, director)
- The Monkey Talks (1927, director)
- Sadie Thompson (1928, director)
- The Red Dance (1928, director)
- Me, Gangster (1928, director, debut of Don Terry)
- The Cock-Eyed World (1929, director)
- The Big Trail (1930, director, with John Wayne in his first leading role)
- The Man Who Came Back (1931, director)
- Women of All Nations (1931, director)
- The Yellow Ticket (1931, director)
- Wild Girl (1932, director)
- Me and My Gal (1932, director)
- Sailor's Luck (1933, director)
- The Bowery (1933, director)
- Every Night at Eight (1935, Director)
- Big Brown Eyes (1936, director)
- Klondike Annie (1936, director)
- O.H.M.S. (1937, director)
- Jump for Glory (1937, director)
- St. Louis Blues (1939, director)
- The Roaring Twenties (1939, director)
- Dark Command (1940, director)
- They Drive by Night (1940, director)
- High Sierra (1941, director)
- The Strawberry Blonde (1941, director)
- They Died with Their Boots On (1941, director)
- Manpower (1941, director)
- Desperate Journey (1942, director)
- Gentleman Jim (1942, director)
- Background to Danger (1943, director)
- Action in the North Atlantic (1943, director, uncredited)
- Uncertain Glory (1944, director)
- Objective, Burma! (1945, director)
- The Man I Love (1947, director)
- Pursued (1947, director)
- Cheyenne (1947, director)
- Silver River (1948, director)
- Fighter Squadron (1948, director)
- White Heat (1949, director)
- Colorado Territory (1949, director)
- The Enforcer (1951, director, uncredited) (Note: Walsh replaced director Bretaigne Windust, who fell severely ill, on The Enforcer and shot over half the film, but refused to take screen credit.)
- Captain Horatio Hornblower (1951, director)
- Along the Great Divide (1951, director)
- Distant Drums (1951, director)
- Blackbeard the Pirate (1952, director)
- The World in His Arms (1952, director)
- Gun Fury (1953, director)
- A Lion Is in the Streets (1953, director)
- The Lawless Breed (1953, director)
- Sea Devils (1953, director)
- Saskatchewan (1954, director)
- Battle Cry (1955, director)
- The Tall Men (1955, director)
- The Revolt of Mamie Stover (1956, director)
- The King and Four Queens (1956, director)
- Band of Angels (1957, director)
- The Sheriff of Fractured Jaw (1958, director)
- The Naked and the Dead (1958, director)
- Esther and the King (1960, director)
- Marines, Let's Go (1961, director)
- A Distant Trumpet (1964, director)
- None but the Brave (released in 1965, creative consultant)

== Miscellaneous ==
- The Conqueror (writer, 1917)
- The Big Trail (story contributor, uncredited, 1930)
- Captain Horatio Hornblower (producer, uncredited, 1951)
- The Lawless Breed (producer, uncredited, 1953)
- Esther and the King (screenplay, 1960)
- The Men Who Made the Movies: Raoul Walsh (TV documentary)
- Himself (1973)
