= Feud (American TV series) =

American anthology television series

- Genre: Anthology
- Created by: Ryan Murphy; Jaffe Cohen; Michael Zam
- Starring: Jessica Lange; Susan Sarandon; Judy Davis; Jackie Hoffman; Alfred Molina; Stanley Tucci; Alison Wright; Naomi Watts; Diane Lane; Chloë Sevigny; Calista Flockhart; Demi Moore; Molly Ringwald; Treat Williams; Joe Mantello; Russell Tovey; Tom Hollander
- Theme music composer: Mac Quayle (Season 1); Thomas Newman (Season 2)
- Composers: Mac Quayle (Season 1); Thomas Newman (Season 2); Julia Newman (Season 2)
- Country of origin: United States
- Original language: English
- No. of seasons: 2
- No. of episodes: 16

Production
- Executive producers: Ryan Murphy; Dede Gardner; Tim Minear; Alexis Martin Woodall; Jon Robin Baitz; Gus Van Sant; Jeremy Kleiner; Eric Kovtun; Scott Robertson; Naomi Watts
- Producers: Jaffe Cohen; Renee Tab; Michael Zam; Jessica Lange; Susan Sarandon; Kip Davis Myers; Lou Eyrich; Todd Nenninger
- Production locations: Los Angeles, California
- Cinematography: Nelson Cragg
- Editors: Andrew Groves; Adam Penn; Ken Ramos
- Running time: 45–60 minutes
- Production companies: Sawtooth Film Co. (season 2); Plan B Entertainment; Scratchpad (season 2); Ryan Murphy Television (Note: Known as Ryan Murphy Productions for season 1); 20th Television (Note: Known as Fox 21 Television Studios and Touchstone Television until 2020)

Original release
- Network: FX
- Release: March 5, 2017 – March 13, 2024

Feud is an American anthology drama television series created by Ryan Murphy, Jaffe Cohen, and Michael Zam, which premiered on FX on March 5, 2017. Conceived as an anthology series, Feud's first season, Bette and Joan, chronicles the well-documented rivalry between Hollywood actresses Joan Crawford and Bette Davis during and after the production of their psychological horror thriller film What Ever Happened to Baby Jane? (1962); while the second season, Capote vs. The Swans, aired in 2024 and focuses on the fallout of a roman à clef story written by author Truman Capote based on the lives of a group of several New York socialites whom he termed "the Swans".

In the first season, Bette and Joan, Jessica Lange and Susan Sarandon star as Crawford and Davis, respectively. Judy Davis, Jackie Hoffman, Alfred Molina, Stanley Tucci, and Alison Wright feature in supporting roles. Academy Award–winning actresses Catherine Zeta-Jones and Kathy Bates also appear. Critically acclaimed, with major praise for Lange and Sarandon's performances, the first season garnered several accolades. It received 18 nominations at the 69th Primetime Emmy Awards and won two, including Outstanding Hairstyling and Makeup (Non-Prosthetic). Bette and Joan also received nominations for six Critics' Choice Awards, four Golden Globe Awards, two Screen Actors Guild Awards, and three Television Critics Association Awards.

In February 2017, FX renewed the series for a second season. Following a hiatus, in April 2022, it was announced that the second season would be Feud: Capote vs. The Swans, with Jon Robin Baitz serving as showrunner/writer, Gus Van Sant as director, and Naomi Watts starring as Babe Paley, with Tom Hollander portraying Capote. It premiered on January 31, 2024.

== Summary ==
The first season (subtitled Bette and Joan) centers on the backstage battle between Bette Davis (Susan Sarandon) and Joan Crawford (Jessica Lange) during and after the production of their 1962 film What Ever Happened to Baby Jane?.

The second season (subtitled Capote vs. The Swans) focuses on the end of Truman Capote's friendships with many New York socialites nicknamed "the Swans" when he lightly fictionalizes their lives in published excerpts from his ultimately unfinished novel Answered Prayers.

== Cast and characters ==
=== Bette and Joan ===
==== Main ====
- Jessica Lange as Joan Crawford/Blanche Hudson
- Susan Sarandon as Bette Davis/Baby Jane Hudson
- Judy Davis as Hedda Hopper, gossip columnist
- Jackie Hoffman as Mamacita, Crawford's housekeeper
- Alfred Molina as Robert Aldrich, director/producer of What Ever Happened to Baby Jane? and Hush...Hush, Sweet Charlotte
- Stanley Tucci as Jack L. Warner, head of Warner Bros.
- Alison Wright as Pauline Jameson, Aldrich's assistant

==== Recurring ====
- Catherine Zeta-Jones as Olivia de Havilland, Davis's friend and fellow actress who co-stars with her in Hush...Hush, Sweet Charlotte and participates in a 1970s documentary on Crawford
- Kathy Bates as Joan Blondell, Davis's friend and fellow actress who participates in a 1970s documentary on Crawford
- Kiernan Shipka as B. D. Merrill, Davis's daughter
- Reed Diamond as Peter, Joan's latest paramour
- Ken Lerner as Marty, Crawford's agent
- Joel Kelley Dauten as Adam Freedman, a documentary filmmaker
- Molly Price as Harriet Foster Aldrich, Robert Aldrich's wife
- Dominic Burgess as Victor Buono, an actor who co-stars in What Ever Happened to Baby Jane? and Hush...Hush, Sweet Charlotte

==== Historical figures ====
Feud features appearances by a number of actors, directors and other historical figures of the period, including:

- Mark Valley as Gary Merrill, a fading actor and Bette Davis's estranged fourth husband
- Kris Black as Cliff Robertson, Joan's co-star in Autumn Leaves
- Lizz Carter as Margaret Leighton, Bette's co-star in the Broadway production of The Night of the Iguana
- Jake Robards as Patrick O'Neal, Bette's co-star in the Broadway production of The Night of the Iguana
- Alisha Soper as Marilyn Monroe, winner of the Best Actress Golden Globe in 1960 for Some Like It Hot
- Jon Morgan Woodward as Al Steele, the CEO of the Pepsi-Cola Company and Joan Crawford's fourth husband
- Tom Berklund as Fred MacMurray, Joan's co-star in Above Suspicion
- Kerry Stein as Louis B. Mayer, Metro-Goldwyn-Mayer studio head
- Scott Vance as Michael Curtiz, director of Mildred Pierce who gave Crawford her Best Actress Oscar in 1945
- Toby Huss as Frank Sinatra, singer and actor who stars in Aldrich's film 4 for Texas
- Cameron Cowperthwaite as Michael Parks, Bette's co-star in an episode of Perry Mason
- Daniel Hagen as Michael Luciano, film editor of What Ever Happened to Baby Jane?
- Sarah Paulson as Geraldine Page, Davis' co-nominee for Best Actress in 1963
- Serinda Swan as Anne Bancroft, winner of the Best Actress Oscar in 1963 for The Miracle Worker
- John Rubinstein as George Cukor, a film director and longtime friend of Crawford
- Phillip Boyd as Maximilian Schell, winner of the Best Actor Oscar in 1962 for Judgment at Nuremberg
- Cash Black as Rip Torn, Geraldine Page's husband
- Bryant Boon as Gregory Peck, winner of the Best Actor Oscar in 1963 for To Kill a Mockingbird
- Eric Callero as Jack Lord, actor who attended the 35th Academy Awards
- Taylor Coffman as Lee Remick, Davis's co-nominee for Best Actress in 1963
- Anthony Crivello as David Lean, winner of the Best Director Oscar in 1963 for Lawrence of Arabia
- Lindsay Hanzl as Eva Marie Saint, actress who attended the 35th Academy Awards
- Louis B. Jack as Ed Begley, winner of the Best Supporting Actor Oscar in 1963 for Sweet Bird of Youth
- Anthony Tyler Quinn as Wendell Corey, president of the Academy of Motion Picture Arts and Sciences from 1961 to 1963
- Paris Verra as Patty Duke, winner of the Best Supporting Actress Oscar in 1963, who appeared with Bancroft in The Miracle Worker
- Greg Winter as Bob Stack, actor who attended the 35th Academy Awards
- John Waters as William Castle, the director and producer of Crawford's 1964 horror B movie Strait-Jacket
- Raymond J. Barry as Hal LeSueur, Joan Crawford's brother
- Matthew Glave as Joseph Cotten, an actor who co-stars in Hush...Hush, Sweet Charlotte
- Earlene Davis as Agnes Moorehead, an actress who co-stars in Hush...Hush, Sweet Charlotte
- James Hawthorn as Bruce Dern, actor who appears in Hush...Hush, Sweet Charlotte
- Melissa Russell as Diane Baker, Joan's co-star in Strait-Jacket

=== Capote vs. The Swans ===
- Naomi Watts as Babe Paley, a socialite and magazine editor, as well as Capote's best friend.
- Diane Lane as Slim Keith, a socialite and fashion icon with a disdain for Capote.
- Chloë Sevigny as C. Z. Guest, a socialite and author, as well as the last "Swan" to remain friends with Capote.
- Calista Flockhart as Lee Radziwill, a foul-mouthed socialite, as well as the younger sister of Jackie Kennedy.
- Demi Moore as Ann Woodward, a socialite and radio actress accused of murdering her own husband.
- Molly Ringwald as Joanne Carson, a show host and Capote's final martyr.
- Treat Williams as Bill Paley, the adulterous husband of Babe Paley.
- Joe Mantello as Jack Dunphy, Capote's longest-lasting boyfriend, who got him into rehab.
- Russell Tovey as John O'Shea, (Note: Despite being credited for all episodes, he's only in three) Capote's abusive side-piece with a "heterosexual dominance" complex.
- Tom Hollander as Truman Capote, the esteemed author of La Côte Basque, 1965, a story with deep and long-lasting consequences for New York elite society—in particular the group of socialites known as "the Swans".

== Episodes ==
Season	Title	Episodes	Originally released	
Season	Title	Episodes	First released	Last released
1	Bette and Joan	8	March 5, 2017	April 23, 2017
2	Capote vs. The Swans	8	January 31, 2024	March 13, 2024

=== Season 1: Bette and Joan (2017) ===
No. overall	No. in season	Title	Directed by	Written by	Original release date	Prod. code	U.S. viewers (millions)
1	1	"Pilot"	Ryan Murphy	Jaffe Cohen & Michael Zam and Ryan Murphy	March 5, 2017	1WBB01	2.26
In 1978, filmmaker Adam Friedman interviews Olivia de Havilland and Joan Blondell for a documentary about the complex relationship between Joan Crawford and Bette Davis. Seventeen years earlier, with her career gradually waning, Joan pitches a film adaptation of the horror novel What Ever Happened to Baby Jane? to Bette and director Robert Aldrich. Aldrich, in turn, brings Baby Jane to Jack L. Warner, who comes on board despite his hatred for both women. But as filming begins, Joan's acute narcissism and Bette's strong opinions quickly put them at odds.
2	2	"The Other Woman"	Ryan Murphy	Jaffe Cohen & Michael Zam and Tim Minear	March 12, 2017	1WBB02	1.32
Bette and Joan act on their shared interest to eliminate a showy supporting actress, but their problems at home spill over at work. Jack forces Aldrich to create a power play between the two actresses for hype.
3	3	"Mommie Dearest"	Gwyneth Horder-Payton	Tim Minear	March 19, 2017	1WBB03	1.08
Bette and Joan learn some intimate details about each other, but their animosity climaxes on set as filming winds down.
4	4	"More, or Less"	Liza Johnson	Gina Welch & Tim Minear	March 26, 2017	1WBB04	1.21
Contrary to all expectations, Baby Jane is a huge hit. With no other film offers, Joan's jealousy grows as Bette's performance is critically acclaimed. She fears that she will not get an Oscar nomination, but that Bette will. Meanwhile, Pauline hopes to direct her own film but is discouraged by the lack of support from Aldrich and Joan.
5	5	"And the Winner Is... (The Oscars of 1963)"	Ryan Murphy	Ryan Murphy	April 2, 2017	1WBB05	1.36
Bette is on track to win a record-breaking third Best Actress Oscar. Joan and Hedda Hopper launch a clandestine campaign against her. Joan bullies nominee Geraldine Page to skip the ceremony and allow Joan to accept the award on her behalf if she wins; Anne Bancroft, unable to attend, also allows Joan to accept her award. Offering herself as a presenter, Joan arrives at the 1963 Academy Awards ceremony dressed like a "silver Oscar." With a shocked Olivia de Havilland and crushed Bette watching, Joan accepts the Oscar for Bancroft.
6	6	"Hagsploitation"	Tim Minear	Tim Minear & Gina Welch	April 9, 2017	1WBB06	1.06
As Joan promotes her new film, Strait-Jacket, Jack enlists Aldrich to write and direct a new film in the successful "Hagsploitation" genre. Aldrich ultimately takes his script, called Hush...Hush, Sweet Charlotte, to Darryl F. Zanuck to produce, angering Jack. Aldrich lures Joan in return for top billing, and Bette in return for creative control. Bette becomes increasingly unreasonable, and Joan's suspicions about Bette's influence over Aldrich are confirmed when Joan hears Bette having champagne with him.
7	7	"Abandoned!"	Helen Hunt	Jaffe Cohen & Michael Zam	April 16, 2017	1WBB07	1.31
With Robert's divorce pending, he and Bette have an affair. On location filming Hush...Hush, Sweet Charlotte, Joan feels disrespected by the production (especially after being left behind when the production wrapped in Baton Rouge) and comes to resent Bette's creative input as a producer. On the other hand, Bette is relishing her new role as a producer but is haunted by Jack Warner's mistreatment when she first started in Hollywood. When filming returns to Los Angeles, Joan fakes an illness to stall production in hopes that 20th Century Fox will cancel the film. She eventually learns that the studio is suing her for breach of contract and, while in the hospital, learns via radio announcement that Olivia has replaced her. Hysterical, Joan destroys her hospital room, and Mamacita leaves her.
8	8	"You Mean All This Time We Could Have Been Friends?"	Gwyneth Horder-Payton	Gina Welch	April 23, 2017	1WBB08	1.30
Following the critical failure of her latest film, Trog, and bad publicity photos, Joan officially retires from acting. In the following years, she moves to New York City. Realizing how miserable she is alone, she makes amends with Mamacita and her daughter, Cathy. One night, Joan hallucinates Jack and Hedda having a party in her apartment, where she joins them and is later joined by Bette. In the fantasy, Joan and Bette end their feud and speak civilly toward each other about one another. In mid-1977, Joan's health deteriorates rapidly, and she dies with Mamacita at her side. Meanwhile, Bette, who has worked consistently since Sweet Charlotte, learns of Joan's death via a journalist who asks for comment. Bette responds with one final negative comment towards Joan. At the 1978 Academy Awards ceremony, Adam finishes his interviews for his documentary, with Bette refusing to be a part. Bette, Olivia, and others express sadness at Joan's brief appearance in the In Memoriam segment, while simultaneously being horrified by the brevity of the moment. A flashback to the first day of filming Baby Jane shows Bette and Joan chatting happily before going into their separate trailers.

=== Season 2: Capote vs. The Swans (2024) ===
No. overall	No. in season	Title	Directed by	Written by	Original release date	Prod. code	U.S. viewers (millions)
9	1	"Pilot"	Gus Van Sant	Jon Robin Baitz	January 31, 2024	3WBB01	0.461
10	2	"Ice Water in Their Veins"	Gus Van Sant	Jon Robin Baitz	January 31, 2024	3WBB02	0.263
11	3	"Masquerade 1966"	Gus Van Sant	Jon Robin Baitz	February 7, 2024	3WBB03	0.298
12	4	"It's Impossible"	Gus Van Sant	Jon Robin Baitz	February 14, 2024	3WBB04	0.259
13	5	"The Secret Inner Lives of Swans"	Max Winkler	Jon Robin Baitz	February 21, 2024	3WBB05	0.342
14	6	"Hats, Gloves and Effete Homosexuals"	Gus Van Sant	Jon Robin Baitz	February 28, 2024	3WBB06	0.281
15	7	"Beautiful Babe"	Jennifer Lynch	Jon Robin Baitz	March 6, 2024	3WBB07	0.297
16	8	"Phantasm Forgiveness"	Gus Van Sant	Jon Robin Baitz	March 13, 2024	3WBB08	0.307

== Production ==
=== Development ===
Ryan Murphy, a fan of Davis since his childhood, interviewed the actress just months before her death in 1989. The agreed-upon 20-minute interview lasted four hours, and inspired his characterization of Davis in Feud. He said, "When I would ask her about Joan Crawford ... She would just go on about how much she hated her. But then she would sort of say ... 'She was a professional. And I admired that'." Murphy first conceived Bette and Joan as a film years before the FX series, and approached both Sarandon and Lange about the lead roles. Sarandon said, "It just felt like it didn't have a context, just being bitchy and kind of funny, but what else? In expanding it to eight hours, you could get more complexity and so many other characters."

Feud: Bette and Joan was being written at the same time that Murphy was forming his Half Foundation, which promotes an increased presence of women in film and television production positions. The series features 15 acting roles for women over 40, and half the episodes were directed by women, including actress Helen Hunt. Initially conceived as an anthology series, Feud, developed by Murphy, was picked up to series by FX on May 5, 2016. Bette and Joan was inspired by the real-life feud between Crawford and Davis, and explores issues of sexism, ageism, and misogyny in Hollywood. Its eight episodes were expanded from a feature-length screenplay Murphy had optioned called Best Actress by Jaffe Cohen and Michael Zam.

Sarandon said, "In our story, it was a fact that [the people behind Baby Jane] encouraged the animosity [between Crawford and Davis], first of all to control them, second of all to make what they thought was more onscreen tension, and that really hasn't changed a lot." Melanie McFarland of Salon wrote that the series shows "just how brutal the Hollywood system was on some of the greatest talents in its firmament" and that it "cuts to the root of why collaborating and delighting in the fall of the mighty is eternally marketable." The Crawford-Davis feud was also documented in Shaun Considine's 1989 book Bette and Joan: The Divine Feud.

=== Casting ===
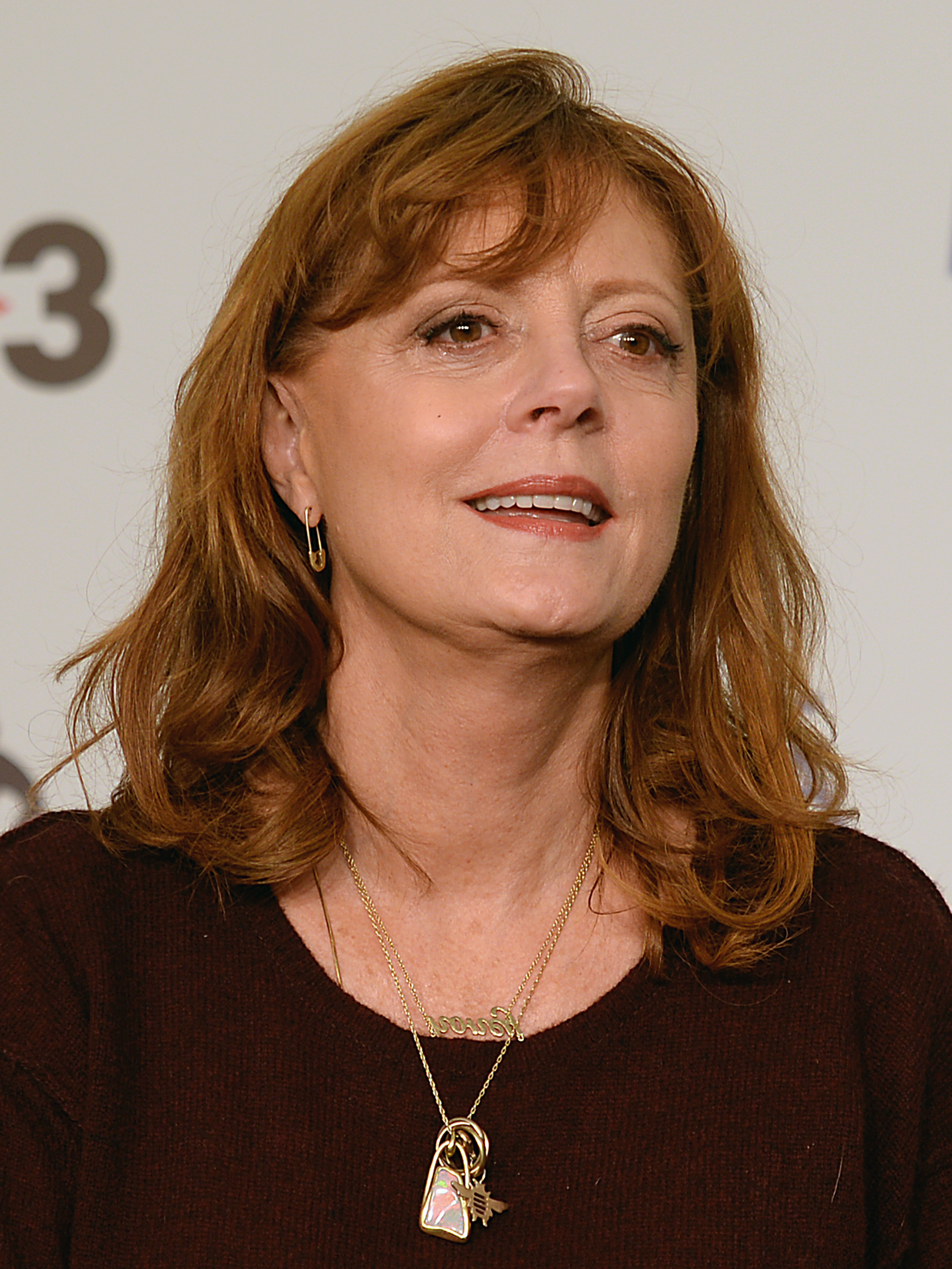
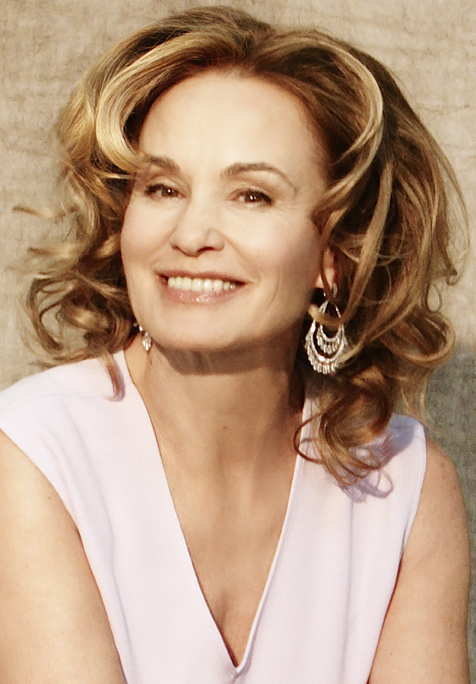
Susan Sarandon (left) and Jessica Lange (right) star as Bette Davis and Joan Crawford.

Frequent Murphy collaborator Jessica Lange and Susan Sarandon were attached to star as Joan Crawford and Bette Davis in Feud. Alfred Molina, Stanley Tucci, Judy Davis, and Dominic Burgess were also a part of the cast, in the roles of Robert Aldrich, Jack L. Warner, Hedda Hopper, and Victor Buono, respectively. In August 2016, Catherine Zeta-Jones and Sarah Paulson joined the cast playing Olivia de Havilland and Geraldine Page, respectively.

In September 2016, it was reported that American Horror Story executive producer Tim Minear would be co-showrunning the series with Murphy. Jackie Hoffman joined the cast as Mamacita, Crawford's housekeeper. In November 2016, Molly Price, Kathy Bates and Alison Wright joined the cast of the series, in the roles of Harriet Foster, Joan Blondell, and Pauline Jameson. In January 2017, it was announced Kiernan Shipka was cast in the series as Davis's daughter, Barbara "B.D." Sherry.

Sarandon admitted to initially being "overwhelmed and terrified" about the prospect of portraying Davis accurately. She said, "She's so big and she really was so big, so I tried not to make her a caricature or someone a female impersonator would do ... That was my fear, that she would just be kind of one-dimensional." Lange said her performance was informed by her view that Crawford's "brutal childhood" was masked by the "beautiful, impenetrable veneer of this great, gorgeous movie star ... So she was always on, which is a tremendous burden in and of itself, but always there was this thing lurking underneath of being this poverty-stricken, abused, unloved, abandoned young child and woman." Both Sarandon and Lange researched their roles by reading books by and about Davis and Crawford, and watching and listening to TV performances and recordings.

For Capote vs. The Swans, Naomi Watts was cast to star as Babe Paley in April 2022. In August, Chloë Sevigny, Tom Hollander, Calista Flockhart and Diane Lane would be added to the cast. The following month, Demi Moore and Molly Ringwald were added to the cast. In March 2023, Chris Chalk announced his involvement in the season.

On June 30, 2017, a day before her 101st birthday, actress Olivia de Havilland filed a lawsuit against Feud: Bette and Joan for inaccurately portraying her and using her likeness without permission. The lawsuit stated that the pseudo-documentary-style of the series leads viewers to believe that the statements made by the actress portraying de Havilland in the show are accurate, but that in fact de Havilland had not said such things in real life. The various defendants filed a motion to dismiss under California's "anti-SLAPP" law. The trial court denied the motion but, on March 26, 2018, the California Court of Appeal, Second District, reversed the decision and ordered the lawsuit dismissed on the grounds that no person can "own history". The Court of Appeal further ruled the defendants were entitled to be reimbursed their attorneys' fees. De Havilland filed for estoppels to pursue action with higher courts, securing a restraining order against Murphy and the production company from airing Feud until further review and a court date with the United States Supreme Court. In January 2019, the Supreme Court declined to hear the case.

=== Future ===
FX renewed the series for a 10-episode second season on February 28, 2017, with Murphy and Jon Robin Baitz attached as writers. Initially planned with a focus on the relationship between Charles, Prince of Wales and Diana, Princess of Wales, the season was first titled Charles and Diana, then renamed Buckingham Palace, with Matthew Goode and Rosamund Pike cast in the titular roles. Plans for Buckingham Palace were eventually scrapped in August 2018. In November 2019, Murphy stated he was open to resume work on Feud.

An April 2022 announcement unveiled new plans for the second season, with Jon Robin Baitz serving as showrunner/writer and Gus Van Sant as director: Feud: Capote vs. The Swans would focus on the fallout of a roman à clef by author Truman Capote based on the lives of several New York socialites. It premiered on January 31, 2024.

== Release ==
=== Marketing ===
Murphy gave several interviews about Feud during the 2017 Winter TCA Press Tour. The show's first teaser trailer was released on January 19, 2017, and the second the following day. That same week, Lange and Sarandon appeared on the cover of Entertainment Weekly as Crawford and Davis. FX released another teaser on January 23, two on February 5, one on February 7, and one on February 8. A short commercial for the show also aired during Super Bowl LI.

=== Premiere ===
Feud had its official premiere at the Chinese Theatre in Los Angeles on March 1, 2017. Before the show's premiere, FX held screenings of the pilot episode at several gay bars across the United States.

=== Broadcast ===
The first season of eight episodes, Bette and Joan, premiered in the United States on March 5, 2017, on FX and on BBC Two in the United Kingdom on December 16, 2017.

The second season of eight episodes, Capote vs. The Swans, premiered in the United States on January 31, 2024, on FX, with a special Director’s Cut of the first episode simulcasting on its sibling network FXX.

=== Soundtrack ===
The original television soundtrack of Feud: Bette and Joan, with music by Mac Quayle, was released in two editions: a regular edition with 23 tracks, and a limited edition with 31 tracks.

== Reception ==
=== Critical response ===
==== Bette and Joan ====
Feud received critical acclaim, with major praise for Lange and Sarandon's performances. On review aggregator Rotten Tomatoes, the first season has an approval rating of 95% based on 118 reviews, with an average rating of 8.15/10. The site's critical consensus reads, "While campily and sweetly indulgent, Feud: Bette and Joan provides poignant understanding of humanity, sorrow, and pain while breezily feeding inquisitive gossip-starved minds." On Metacritic, the first season has a score of 81 out of 100, based on 44 critics, indicating "universal acclaim".

Melanie McFarland of Salon called the writing "creatively wicked" and the series "outrageously fantastic", praising Lange and Sarandon for their performances and for "tempering their decadent rages and vengeful spats with a gutting sense of loneliness that tempers its lightness in solemnity." Verne Gay of Newsday wrote that the series is "Full of joy, humor, brilliant writing and performances, and a deep unabiding love for what really makes Hollywood great—the women." People called the series "bitter, biting and entertaining". The Atlantic's Spencer Kornhaber described the first few episodes as "deft and satisfying" but suggested that "maybe six installments, rather than eight, were all this tale needed". Alan Sepinwall of Uproxx wrote that the series is "big and it's catty, but it's also smart and elegant, with the old Hollywood setting toning down some of Murphy's more scattershot creative impulses." Emily Nussbaum, in The New Yorker, praised Murphy's ambition and lauded both stars, saying of the series, "Beneath the zingers and the poolside muumuus, the show's stark theme is how skillfully patriarchy screws with women's heads—mostly by building a home in there."

Not all reviews were positive. Sonia Saraiya of Variety compared Bette and Joan unfavorably to Murphy's The People v. O. J. Simpson: American Crime Story, writing that Feud is "neither as brilliantly campy and hateful as What Ever Happened to Baby Jane? nor as contextualizing and profound as People v. O. J. Simpson." David Weigand of the San Francisco Chronicle gave the series a mixed review, criticizing the script and Lange's performance, but praising Sarandon's, writing: "Lange is always interesting, but she’s only occasionally convincing here as Crawford. The voice is too high, for one thing. Sarandon fares better, as much good as that does with such a lousy script." The Guardian also criticized the series for being "lightweight", noting, "At just eight episodes, there’s almost too much to cover and at times, one craves a little more depth to certain moments." They singled out Lange's performance, however, writing, "Lange in particular moves past just an easy impression to something with far more weight. In a reversal of fortune that would make Crawford cackle in her grave, it’s likely that she’ll be the one up for awards at the end of the year rather than her co-star."

==== Capote vs. The Swans ====
On review aggregator Rotten Tomatoes, Feud: Capote vs. The Swans has an approval rating of 78% based on 80 reviews, with an average rating of 7.4/10. The site's critical consensus reads, "While this Feud might lack the abundance of incident that made its predecessor such a nasty delight, Capote vs. the Swans' luxe milieu and dynamite ensemble will keep spectators entertained." On Metacritic, the season has a score of 70 out of 100, based on 37 critics, indicating "generally favorable reviews".

=== Ratings ===
The first episode drew 2.26 million live-plus-same-day viewers, which Deadline.com characterized as "solid" and made it the most watched program on FX that week. In comparison, the premiere of The People v. O. J. Simpson attracted 5.1 million viewers in 2016, and the FX limited series Fargo got 2.66 million in 2014. The premiere earned 3.8 million viewers in the Nielsen live-plus-three-days ratings, and 5.17 million viewers total when including two encore broadcasts, making it the highest rated new series debut on FX since The People v. O. J. Simpson.

Viewership and ratings per episode of Feud
No.	Title	Air date	Rating (18–49)	Viewers (millions)	DVR (18–49)	DVR viewers (millions)	Total (18–49)	Total viewers (millions)
1	"Pilot"	March 5, 2017	0.5	2.26	0.4	1.54	0.9	3.79
2	"The Other Woman"	March 12, 2017	0.3	1.32	0.4	1.46	0.7	2.78
3	"Mommie Dearest"	March 19, 2017	0.3	1.08	0.4	1.46	0.7	2.54
4	"More, or Less"	March 26, 2017	0.3	1.21	0.3	1.33	0.6	2.54
5	"And the Winner Is... (The Oscars of 1963)"	April 2, 2017	0.4	1.36	0.3	1.40	0.7	2.76
6	"Hagsploitation"	April 9, 2017	0.3	1.06	0.3	1.28	0.6	2.34
7	"Abandoned!"	April 16, 2017	0.4	1.31	—N/a	1.36	—N/a	2.67
8	"You Mean All This Time We Could Have Been Friends?"	April 23, 2017	0.3	1.30	0.3	1.37	0.6	2.68

=== Accolades ===
Association	Year	Category	Nominated artist/work	Result	Ref.
Critics' Choice Television Awards	2017	Best Limited Series	Feud: Bette and Joan	Nominated	
Critics' Choice Television Awards	2017	Best Actress in a Movie/Limited Series	Jessica Lange	Nominated	
Critics' Choice Television Awards	2017	Best Supporting Actor in a Movie/Limited Series	Alfred Molina	Nominated	
Critics' Choice Television Awards	2017	Best Supporting Actor in a Movie/Limited Series	Stanley Tucci	Nominated	
Critics' Choice Television Awards	2017	Best Supporting Actress in a Movie/Limited Series	Judy Davis	Nominated	
Critics' Choice Television Awards	2017	Best Supporting Actress in a Movie/Limited Series	Jackie Hoffman	Nominated	
Critics' Choice Television Awards	2024	Best Actor in a Movie/Miniseries	Tom Hollander	Nominated	
Critics' Choice Television Awards	2024	Best Actress in a Movie/Miniseries	Naomi Watts	Nominated	
Critics' Choice Television Awards	2024	Best Supporting Actor in a Movie/Miniseries	Treat Williams	Nominated	
Golden Globe Awards	2017	Best Miniseries or Television Film	Feud: Bette and Joan	Nominated	
Golden Globe Awards	2017	Best Actress – Miniseries or Television Film	Jessica Lange	Nominated	
Golden Globe Awards	2017	Best Actress – Miniseries or Television Film	Susan Sarandon	Nominated	
Golden Globe Awards	2017	Best Supporting Actor – Series, Miniseries or Television Film	Alfred Molina	Nominated	
Golden Globe Awards	2024	Best Actress – Miniseries or Television Film	Naomi Watts	Nominated	
Hollywood Music in Media Awards	2017	Main Title Theme – TV Show/Limited Series	Mac Quayle	Nominated	
Primetime Emmy Awards	2017	Outstanding Limited Series	Feud: Bette and Joan	Nominated	
Primetime Emmy Awards	2017	Outstanding Lead Actress in a Limited Series or Movie	Jessica Lange	Nominated	
Primetime Emmy Awards	2017	Outstanding Lead Actress in a Limited Series or Movie	Susan Sarandon	Nominated	
Primetime Emmy Awards	2017	Outstanding Supporting Actor in a Limited Series or Movie	Alfred Molina	Nominated	
Primetime Emmy Awards	2017	Outstanding Supporting Actor in a Limited Series or Movie	Stanley Tucci	Nominated	
Primetime Emmy Awards	2017	Outstanding Supporting Actress in a Limited Series or Movie	Judy Davis	Nominated	
Primetime Emmy Awards	2017	Outstanding Supporting Actress in a Limited Series or Movie	Jackie Hoffman	Nominated	
Primetime Emmy Awards	2017	Outstanding Directing for a Limited Series, Movie, or Dramatic Special	Ryan Murphy (for "And the Winner Is... (The Oscars of 1963)")	Nominated	
Primetime Emmy Awards	2017	Outstanding Writing for a Limited Series, Movie, or Dramatic Special	Jaffe Cohen, Ryan Murphy, and Michael Zam (for "Pilot")	Nominated	
Primetime Emmy Awards	2017	Outstanding Writing for a Limited Series, Movie, or Dramatic Special	Ryan Murphy (for "And the Winner Is... (The Oscars of 1963)")	Nominated	
Primetime Emmy Awards	2017	Outstanding Casting for a Limited Series, Movie, or Special	Eric Dawson and Robert J. Ulrich	Nominated	
Primetime Emmy Awards	2017	Outstanding Costumes for a Period/Fantasy Series, Limited Series, or Movie	Lou Eyrich, Hannah Jacobs, and Katie Saunders (for "And the Winner Is... (The Oscars of 1963)")	Nominated	
Primetime Emmy Awards	2017	Outstanding Hairstyling for a Limited Series or Movie	Chris Clark, Ralph Michael Abalos, Wendy Southard, and Helena Cepeda	Won	
Primetime Emmy Awards	2017	Outstanding Main Title Design	Ryan Murphy, Alexis Martin Woodall, Kyle Cooper, Nadia Tzuo and Margherita Premuroso	Nominated	
Primetime Emmy Awards	2017	Outstanding Makeup for a Limited Series or Movie (Non-Prosthetic)	Eryn Krueger Mekash, Robin Beauschense, Tym Buacharern, Kim Ayers, Becky Cotton, and David Williams	Won	
Primetime Emmy Awards	2017	Outstanding Main Title Theme Music	Mac Quayle	Nominated	
Primetime Emmy Awards	2017	Outstanding Music Composition for a Limited Series, Movie, or Special	Mac Quayle (for "Pilot")	Nominated	
Primetime Emmy Awards	2017	Outstanding Production Design for a Narrative Contemporary or Fantasy Program (One Hour or More)	Judy Becker, Jamie McCall and Florencia Martin	Nominated	
Primetime Emmy Awards	2017	Outstanding Short Form Nonfiction or Reality Series	Feud: Bette and Joan: Inside Look	Nominated	
Primetime Emmy Awards	2024	Outstanding Lead Actor in a Limited or Anthology Series or Movie	Tom Hollander	Nominated	
Primetime Emmy Awards	2024	Outstanding Lead Actress in a Limited or Anthology Series or Movie	Naomi Watts	Nominated	
Primetime Emmy Awards	2024	Outstanding Supporting Actor in a Limited Series or Movie	Treat Williams	Nominated	
Primetime Emmy Awards	2024	Outstanding Supporting Actress in a Limited Series or Movie	Diane Lane	Nominated	
Primetime Emmy Awards	2024	Outstanding Directing for a Limited or Anthology Series or Movie	Gus Van Sant (for "Pilot")	Nominated	
Primetime Emmy Awards	2024	Outstanding Original Main Title Theme Music	Thomas Newman	Nominated	
Primetime Emmy Awards	2024	Outstanding Period or Fantasy/Sci-Fi Makeup (Non-Prosthetic)	Jacqueline Risotto, Kristen Alimena, Christine Hooghuis, Kyra Panchenko (for "Beautiful Babe")	Nominated	
Primetime Emmy Awards	2024	Outstanding Period or Fantasy/Sci-Fi Hairstyling	Sean Flanigan, Chris Clark, Joshua Gericke, Kevin Maybee (for "Hats, Gloves and Effete Homosexuals")	Nominated	
Primetime Emmy Awards	2024	Outstanding Period Costumes for a Limited or Anthology Series or Movie	Lou Eyrich, Leah Katznelson, Emily O'Connor, Laura McCarthy, Hanna Shea, Miwa Ishii (for "Pilot")	Won	
Primetime Emmy Awards	2024	Outstanding Casting for a Limited or Anthology Series or Movie	Alexa L. Fogel	Nominated	
Screen Actors Guild Awards	2017	Outstanding Performance by a Female Actor in a Miniseries or Television Movie	Jessica Lange	Nominated	
Screen Actors Guild Awards	2017	Outstanding Performance by a Female Actor in a Miniseries or Television Movie	Susan Sarandon	Nominated	
Television Critics Association Awards	2017	Outstanding Achievement in Movies, Miniseries and Specials	Feud: Bette and Joan	Nominated	
Television Critics Association Awards	2017	Individual Achievement in Drama	Jessica Lange	Nominated	
Television Critics Association Awards	2017	Individual Achievement in Drama	Susan Sarandon	Nominated	
Art Directors Guild Awards	2017	Television Movie or Limited Series	Judy Becker (for "Pilot", "And the Winner Is…", "You Mean All This Time We Could Have Been Friends?")	Nominated	
Writers Guild of America Awards	2017	Long Form – Original	Jaffe Cohen, Tim Minear, Ryan Murphy, Gina Welch, Michael Zam	Nominated	
Producers Guild of America Awards	2017	David L. Wolper Award for Outstanding Producer of Long-Form Television	Feud: Bette and Joan	Nominated	
ACE Eddie Awards	2017	Best Edited Mini-Series or Motion Picture for Television	Adam Penn and Ken Ramos (for "Pilot")	Nominated	
Costume Designers Guild Awards	2017	Excellence in Period Television Series	Lou Eyrich	Nominated	
