= What Ever Happened to Baby Jane? =

What Ever Happened to Baby Jane? may refer to:

- What Ever Happened to Baby Jane? (novel), a 1960 suspense novel by Henry Farrell
- What Ever Happened to Baby Jane? (film), a 1962 American psychological thriller, based on the novel
- What Ever Happened to..., a 1991 ABC television film, based on the novel
