= 35th Academy Awards =

- Official poster
- Date: April 8, 1963
- Site: Santa Monica Civic Auditorium
- Hosted by: Frank Sinatra
- Produced by: Arthur Freed
- Directed by: Richard Dunlap

Highlights
- Best Picture: Lawrence of Arabia
- Most awards: Lawrence of Arabia (7)
- Most nominations: Lawrence of Arabia (10)

TV in the United States
- Network: ABC

The 35th Academy Awards, honoring the best in film for 1962, were held on April 8, 1963, at the Santa Monica Civic Auditorium in Santa Monica, California, hosted by Frank Sinatra.

The year's most successful film was David Lean's Lawrence of Arabia, with 10 nominations and 7 wins, including Best Picture and Lean's second win for Best Director. For his role as T. E. Lawrence, Peter O'Toole received his first of eight career nominations for Best Actor, all unsuccessful; as of the 94th Academy Awards, O'Toole and Glenn Close share the record for the most acting nominations with no wins.

Arthur Penn's The Miracle Worker earned the rare distinction of winning two acting Oscars (Best Actress for Anne Bancroft and Best Supporting Actress for Patty Duke) without a nomination for Best Picture. The only other film to do this to date was Hud, the following year.

== Ceremony ==
The Best Actress Oscar occasioned the last act of the long-running feud between Joan Crawford and Bette Davis. They had starred together for the first time in What Ever Happened to Baby Jane?, a surprise hit the previous summer. Davis was nominated for her role as the title character, a faded child star who humiliates the wheelchair-using sister who eclipsed her fame in adulthood, while Crawford was not.

Crawford told the other nominated actresses that, as a courtesy, she would accept their awards for them should they be unavailable on the night of the ceremony. Davis did not object as her rival had often done this, but, on the night of the ceremony, she was livid when Crawford took the stage, wearing what was described as a "radiant smile", to cheerfully accept the award on behalf of Anne Bancroft, who had a Broadway commitment. Davis believed that Crawford had told other Oscar voters to vote for The Miracle Worker star in order to upstage her. The rekindled animosity between the two resulted in Crawford leaving the cast of Hush...Hush, Sweet Charlotte, a planned follow-up to Baby Jane that began filming the next summer, early in production.

== Awards ==
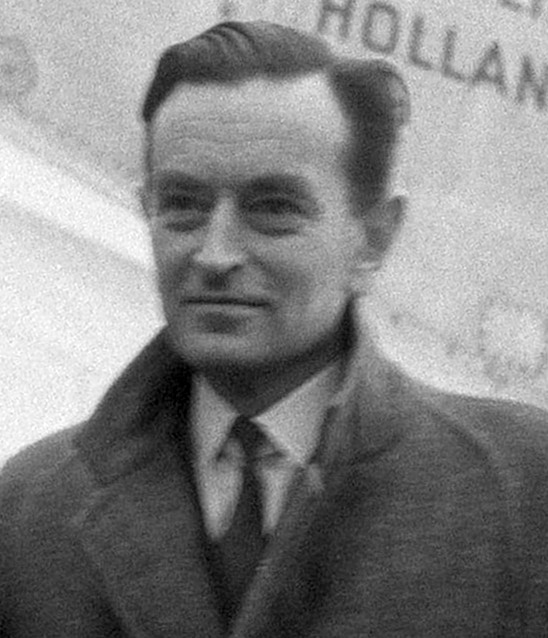
David Lean, Best Director winner

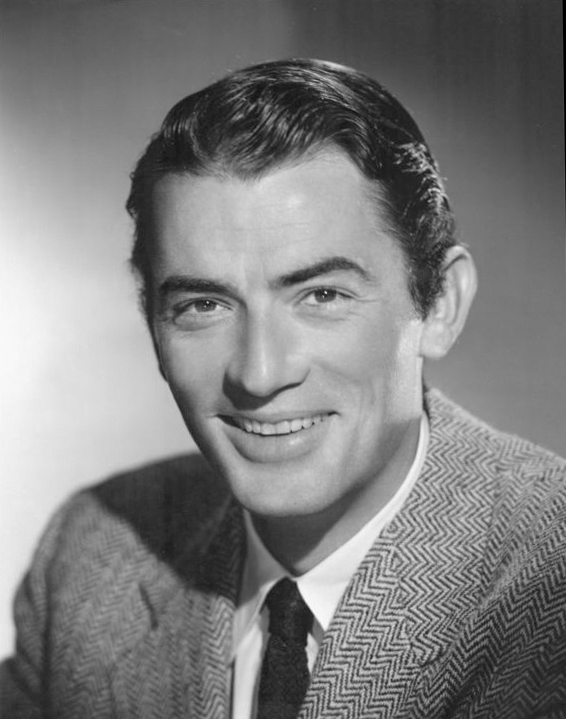
Gregory Peck, Best Actor winner

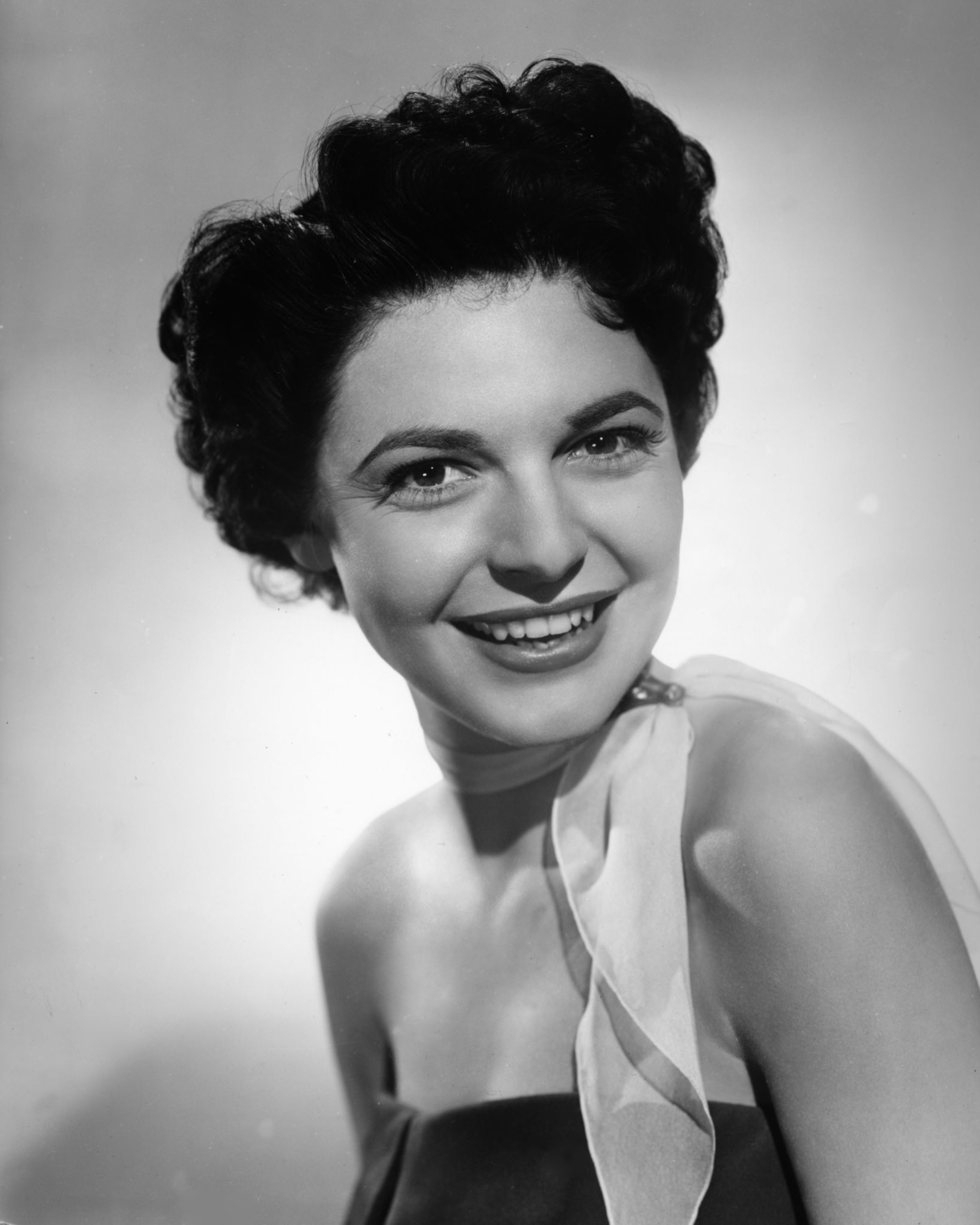
Anne Bancroft, Best Actress winner

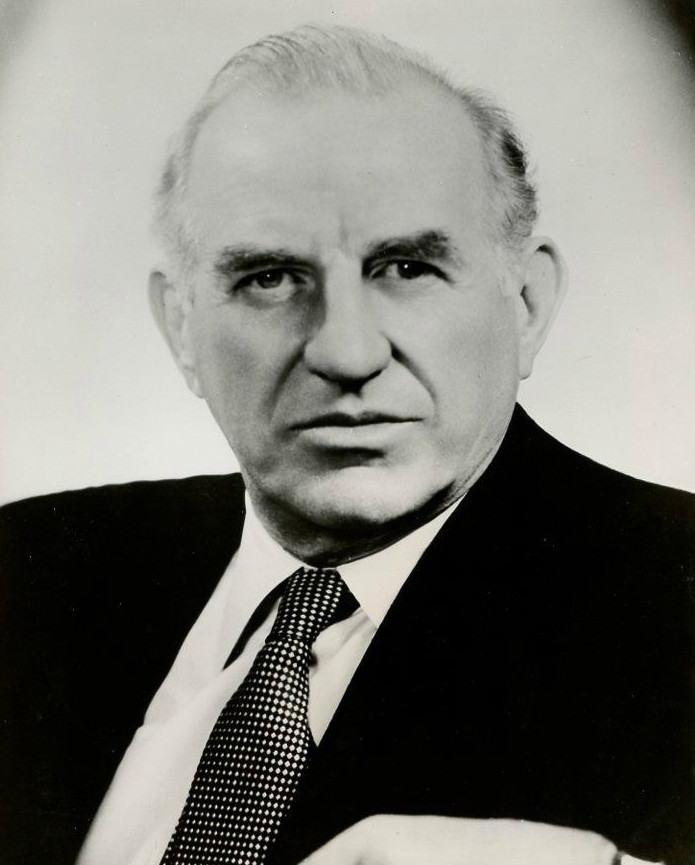
Ed Begley, Best Supporting Actor winner

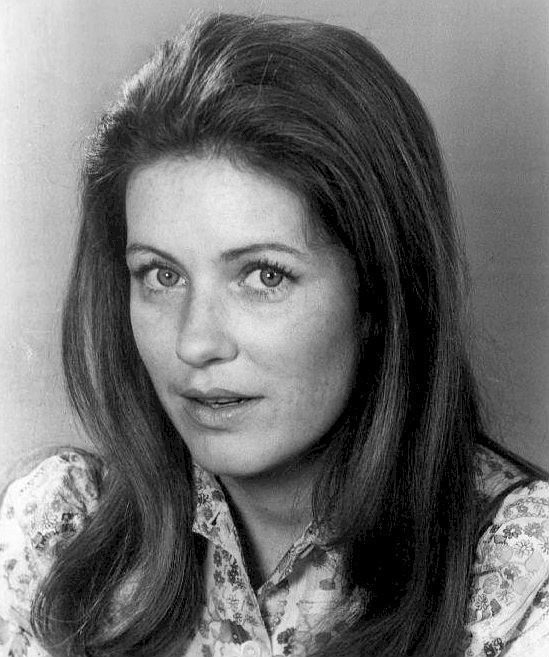
Patty Duke, Best Supporting Actress winner, youngest person to receive an Oscar in a competitive category at the time

Pietro Germi, Best Story and Screenplay Written Directly for the Screen co-winner

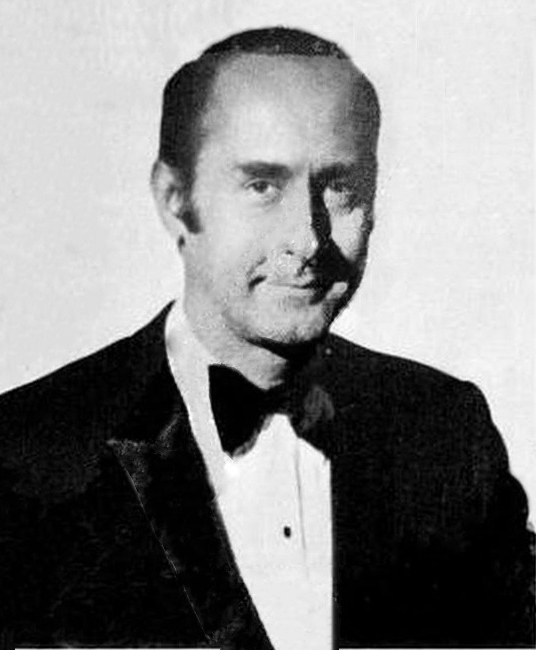
Henry Mancini, Best Song co-winner

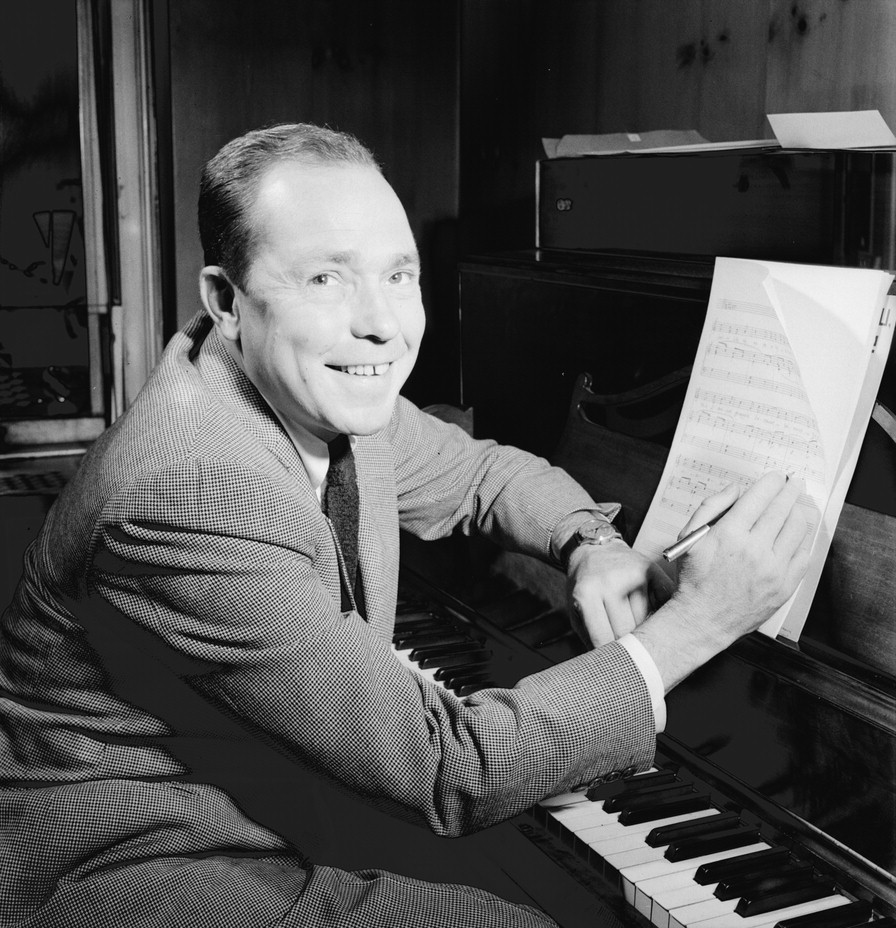
Johnny Mercer, Best Song co-winner

Nominations announced on February 25, 1963. Winners in each category are listed first and highlighted with boldface text.

| **Best Picture**: **Lawrence of Arabia – Sam Spiegel, producer**; The Longest Day – Darryl F. Zanuck, producer; The Music Man – Morton DaCosta, producer; Mutiny on the Bounty – Aaron Rosenberg, producer; To Kill a Mockingbird – Alan J. Pakula, producer | **Best Directing**: **David Lean – Lawrence of Arabia**; Frank Perry – David and Lisa; Pietro Germi – Divorce Italian Style; Arthur Penn – The Miracle Worker; Robert Mulligan – To Kill a Mockingbird |
| **Best Actor**: **Gregory Peck – To Kill a Mockingbird as Atticus Finch**; Burt Lancaster – Birdman of Alcatraz as Robert Stroud; Jack Lemmon – Days of Wine and Roses as Joe Clay; Marcello Mastroianni – Divorce Italian Style as Ferdinando Cefalù; Peter O'Toole – Lawrence of Arabia as T. E. Lawrence | **Best Actress**: **Anne Bancroft – The Miracle Worker as Anne Sullivan**; Bette Davis – What Ever Happened to Baby Jane? as Jane Hudson; Katharine Hepburn – Long Day's Journey into Night as Mary Tyrone; Geraldine Page – Sweet Bird of Youth as Alexandra Del Lago; Lee Remick – Days of Wine and Roses as Kirsten Arnesen-Clay |
| **Best Actor in a Supporting Role**: **Ed Begley – Sweet Bird of Youth as Tom Boss Finley**; Victor Buono – What Ever Happened to Baby Jane? as Edwin Flagg; Telly Savalas – Birdman of Alcatraz as Feto Gomez; Omar Sharif – Lawrence of Arabia as Sherif Ali; Terence Stamp – Billy Budd as Billy Budd | **Best Actress in a Supporting Role**: **Patty Duke – The Miracle Worker as Helen Keller**; Mary Badham – To Kill a Mockingbird as Scout; Shirley Knight – Sweet Bird of Youth as Heavenly Finley; Angela Lansbury – The Manchurian Candidate as Mrs. Eleanor Iselin; Thelma Ritter – Birdman of Alcatraz as Elizabeth McCartney Stroud |
| **Best Writing (Story and Screenplay – Written Directly for the Screen)**: **Divorce Italian Style – Ennio De Concini, Alfredo Giannetti and Pietro Germi**; Freud: The Secret Passion – Story by Charles Kaufman; Screenplay by Charles Kaufman and Wolfgang Reinhardt; Last Year at Marienbad – Alain Robbe-Grillet; That Touch of Mink – Stanley Shapiro and Nate Monaster; Through a Glass Darkly – Ingmar Bergman | **Best Writing (Screenplay – Based on Material from Another Medium)**: **To Kill a Mockingbird – Horton Foote**; David and Lisa – Eleanor Perry; Lawrence of Arabia – Robert Bolt and Michael Wilson (Note: Michael Wilson's original screenplay of Lawrence of Arabia was rewritten by Robert Bolt, retaining Wilson's characters and characterizations. Bolt received sole credit as Wilson was blacklisted at the time. Wilson's nomination was retroactively granted by the Academy Board of Directors on September 26, 1995.); Lolita – Vladimir Nabokov; The Miracle Worker – William Gibson |
| **Best Foreign Language Film**: **Sundays and Cybele (France)**; Electra (Greece); The Four Days of Naples (Italy); Keeper of Promises (The Given Word) (Brazil); Tlayucan (Mexico) | **Best Documentary (Feature)**: **Black Fox – Louis Clyde Stoumen**; Alvorada – Hugo Niebeling |
| **Best Documentary (Short Subject)**: **Dylan Thomas – Jack Howells**; The John Glenn Story – William L. Hendricks; The Road to the Wall – Robert Saudek | **Best Short Subject (Live Action)**: **Heureux Anniversaire – Pierre Étaix and J. C. Carrière**; Big City Blues – Martina Huguenot van der Linden and Charles Huguenot van der Linden; The Cadillac – Robert Clouse; The Cliff Dwellers – Hayward Anderson; Pan – Herman van der Horst |
| **Best Short Subject (Cartoon)**: **The Hole – John Hubley and Faith Hubley**; Icarus Montgolfier Wright – Jules Engel; Now Hear This – Warner Bros.; Self Defense ... for Cowards – William L. Snyder; A Symposium on Popular Songs – Walt Disney | **Best Music (Music Score -- Substantially Original)**: **Lawrence of Arabia – Maurice Jarre**; Freud – Jerry Goldsmith; Mutiny on the Bounty – Bronisław Kaper; Taras Bulba – Franz Waxman; To Kill a Mockingbird – Elmer Bernstein |
| **Best Music (Scoring of Music -- Adaptation or Treatment)**: **The Music Man – Ray Heindorf**; Billy Rose's Jumbo – Georgie Stoll; Gigot – Michel Magne; Gypsy – Frank Perkins; The Wonderful World of the Brothers Grimm – Leigh Harline | **Best Music (Song)**: **"Days of Wine and Roses" from Days of Wine and Roses – Music by Henry Mancini; Lyric by Johnny Mercer**; "Love Song From Mutiny on the Bounty (Follow Me)" from Mutiny on the Bounty – Music by Bronisław Kaper; Lyric by Paul Francis Webster; "Song From Two for the Seesaw (Second Chance)" from Two for the Seesaw – Music by André Previn; Lyric by Dory Langdon; "Tender Is the Night" from Tender Is the Night – Music by Sammy Fain; Lyric by Paul Francis Webster; "Walk on the Wild Side" from Walk on the Wild Side – Music by Elmer Bernstein; Lyric by Mack David |
| **Best Sound**: **Lawrence of Arabia – John Cox**; Bon Voyage! – Robert O. Cook; The Music Man – George R. Groves; That Touch of Mink – Waldon O. Watson; What Ever Happened to Baby Jane? – Joseph D. Kelly | **Best Art Direction (Black-and-White)**: **To Kill a Mockingbird – Art Direction: Alexander Golitzen and Henry Bumstead; Set Decoration: Oliver Emert**; Days of Wine and Roses – Art Direction: Joseph C. Wright; Set Decoration: George James Hopkins; The Longest Day – Art Direction: Ted Haworth, Léon Barsacq and Vincent Korda; Set Decoration: Gabriel Béchir; Period of Adjustment – Art Direction: George Davis and Edward Carfagno; Set Decoration: Henry Grace and Richard Pefferle; The Pigeon That Took Rome – Art Direction: Hal Pereira and Roland Anderson; Set Decoration: Samuel M. Comer and Frank R. McKelvy |
| **Best Art Direction (Color)**: **Lawrence of Arabia – Art Direction: John Box and John Stoll; Set Decoration: Dario Simoni**; The Music Man – Art Direction: Paul Groesse; Set Decoration: George James Hopkins; Mutiny on the Bounty – Art Direction: George Davis and Joseph McMillan Johnson; Set Decoration: Henry Grace and Hugh Hunt; That Touch of Mink – Art Direction: Alexander Golitzen and Robert Clatworthy; Set Decoration: George Milo; The Wonderful World of the Brothers Grimm – Art Direction: George Davis and Edward Carfagno; Set Decoration: Henry Grace and Richard Pefferle | **Best Cinematography (Black-and-White)**: **The Longest Day – Jean Bourgoin and Walter Wottitz**; Birdman of Alcatraz – Burnett Guffey; To Kill a Mockingbird – Russell Harlan; Two for the Seesaw – Ted D. McCord; What Ever Happened to Baby Jane? – Ernest Haller |
| **Best Cinematography (Color)**: **Lawrence of Arabia – Freddie Young**; Gypsy – Harry Stradling; Hatari! – Russell Harlan; Mutiny on the Bounty – Robert Surtees; The Wonderful World of the Brothers Grimm – Paul C. Vogel | **Best Costume Design (Black-and-White)**: **What Ever Happened to Baby Jane? – Norma Koch**; Days of Wine and Roses – Don Feld; The Man Who Shot Liberty Valance – Edith Head; The Miracle Worker – Ruth Morley; Phaedra – Denny Vachlioti |
| **Best Costume Design (Color)**: **The Wonderful World of the Brothers Grimm – Mary Wills**; Bon Voyage! – Bill Thomas; Gypsy – Orry-Kelly; The Music Man – Dorothy Jeakins; My Geisha – Edith Head | **Best Film Editing**: **Lawrence of Arabia – Anne V. Coates**; The Longest Day – Samuel E. Beetley; The Manchurian Candidate – Ferris Webster; The Music Man – William H. Ziegler; Mutiny on the Bounty – John McSweeney Jr. |
**Best Special Effects**: **The Longest Day – Visual Effects by Robert MacDonald; Audible Effects by Jacques Maumont**; Mutiny on the Bounty – Visual Effects by A. Arnold Gillespie; Audible Effects by Milo B. Lory

=== Jean Hersholt Humanitarian Award ===
- Steve Broidy

== Presenters and performers ==
=== Presenters ===
- George Chakiris (Presenter: Best Supporting Actress)
- Wendell Corey (Presenter: Best Foreign Language Film)
- Joan Crawford (Presenter: Best Director)
- Bette Davis (Presenter: Writing Awards)
- Olivia de Havilland (Presenter: Best Picture)
- Van Heflin (Presenter: Short Subjects Awards)
- Audrey Hepburn and Eva Marie Saint (Presenter: Best Costume Design)
- Gene Kelly (Presenter: Best Art Direction)
- Sophia Loren (Presenter: Best Actor)
- Karl Malden (Presenter: Best Film Editing)
- Rita Moreno (Presenter: Best Supporting Actor)
- Donna Reed (Presenter: Best Cinematography)
- Ginger Rogers (Presenter: Best Original Score)
- Maximilian Schell (Presenter: Best Actress)
- Frank Sinatra (Presenter: Best Original Song)
- Miyoshi Umeki (Presenter: Documentary Awards)
- Shelley Winters (Presenter: Best Sound Recording and Best Special Effects)

=== Performers ===
- Alfred Newman (musical director)
- Robert Goulet ("Days of Wine and Roses" from Days of Wine and Roses, "Love Song from Mutiny on the Bounty (Follow Me)" from Mutiny on the Bounty, "Song from Two for the Seesaw (Second Chance)" from Two for the Seesaw, "Tender Is the Night" from Tender Is the Night and "Walk on the Wild Side" from Walk on the Wild Side)

== Multiple nominations and awards ==
Films with multiple nominations
| Nominations | Film |
|---|---|
| 10 | Lawrence of Arabia |
| 8 | To Kill a Mockingbird |
| 7 | Mutiny on the Bounty |
| 6 | The Music Man |
| 5 | Days of Wine and Roses |
| 5 | The Longest Day |
| 5 | The Miracle Worker |
| 5 | What Ever Happened to Baby Jane? |
| 4 | Birdman of Alcatraz |
| 4 | The Wonderful World of the Brothers Grimm |
| 3 | Divorce Italian Style |
| 3 | Gypsy |
| 3 | Sweet Bird of Youth |
| 3 | That Touch of Mink |
| 2 | Bon Voyage! |
| 2 | David and Lisa |
| 2 | Freud: The Secret Passion |
| 2 | The Manchurian Candidate |
| 2 | Two for the Seesaw |

Films with multiple awards
| Awards | Film |
|---|---|
| 7 | Lawrence of Arabia |
| 3 | To Kill a Mockingbird |
| 2 | The Longest Day |
| 2 | The Miracle Worker |

== See also ==
- 5th Grammy Awards
- 14th Primetime Emmy Awards
- 15th Primetime Emmy Awards
- 16th British Academy Film Awards
- 16th Tony Awards
- 20th Golden Globe Awards
- 1962 in film
