= Debbie Burton =

American singer

Debbie Burton was an American singer. She is best known for dubbing the singing voice of the young Baby Jane Hudson (played by child actress Julie Allred) in the 1962 film What Ever Happened to Baby Jane?, singing the song "I've Written a Letter to Daddy". Burton also sang a duet with Bette Davis, the rock and roll song "What Ever Happened to Baby Jane?", written by Frank DeVol and Lukas Heller. It was released as a promotional single, with Burton's rendition of "I've Written a Letter to Daddy" on the flipside. An instrumental version of "What Ever Happened to Baby Jane?" can be heard in the movie.

In 1964 Burton released a single entitled "The Next Day", which was co-written by Perry Botkin, Jr. with Harry Nilsson. The song was featured on the 2004 compilation Girls Go Zonk: US Beat Chicks and Harmony Honeys.

The single "Baby It's Over" (Capitol 1966) was also written by Nilsson and produced by Botkin.

The music to the song was originally If I Had My Life to Live Over, written by Henry Tobias, Moe Jaffe and Larry Vincent in 1939.

== Filmography ==
Year	Title	Role	Notes
1962	What Ever Happened to Baby Jane?	Singing voice for young Jane Hudson	Voice
