= What Ever Happened to Baby Jane? (film) =

1962 film by Robert Aldrich

- Theatrical release poster
- Directed by: Robert Aldrich
- Screenplay by: Lukas Heller
- Based on: What Ever Happened to Baby Jane? by Henry Farrell
- Produced by: Robert Aldrich
- Starring: Bette Davis; Joan Crawford; Victor Buono; Maidie Norman
- Cinematography: Ernest Haller
- Edited by: Michael Luciano
- Music by: Frank De Vol
- Production company: Seven Arts Productions
- Distributed by: Warner Bros. Pictures
- Release date: October 31, 1962
- Running time: 134 minutes
- Country: United States
- Language: English
- Budget: $1 million
- Box office: $9 million (U.S. rentals)

What Ever Happened to Baby Jane? is a 1962 American psychological horror thriller film directed and produced by Robert Aldrich, and starring Bette Davis and Joan Crawford, and featuring Victor Buono in his major film debut. The screenplay, adapted by Lukas Heller from the novel of the same name by Henry Farrell, follows an aging former child star tormenting her paraplegic sister, also a former film star, in a dilapidated Hollywood mansion.

The film was shot in Los Angeles in the summer of 1962 on a budget of approximately $1 million. The production was noted for rumors of on-set feuds between Davis and Crawford, though the actresses would later deny this. Distributed by Warner Bros. Pictures, What Ever Happened to Baby Jane? premiered in Cincinnati October 31, 1962, and opened the following week in various U.S. cities. The film was met with critical acclaim and was a box office success. It was nominated for five Academy Awards and won one for Best Costume Design, Black-and-White, with Davis receiving her tenth and final nomination for Best Actress.

The alleged bitter rivalry between the two stars, Davis and Crawford, was pivotal to the film's initial success, which helped revitalize their careers. In the years after release, critics continued to acclaim the film for its psychologically driven black comedy, camp, and creation of the psycho-biddy subgenre. The film's controversial content resulted in it originally receiving an X rating in the United Kingdom. Because of the appeal of the film's stars, Dave Itzkoff in The New York Times has identified it as a "cult classic."

In 2003, the character of Baby Jane Hudson was ranked no. 44 on the American Film Institute's list of the 50 Best Villains of American Cinema. In 2021, the film was selected for preservation in the United States National Film Registry by the Library of Congress as being "culturally, historically, or aesthetically significant."

== Plot ==
In 1917, "Baby Jane" Hudson, a spoiled and capricious child actress, performs in vaudeville theaters across the country with her father, who acts as manager and piano accompanist. She is highly successful, and a line of porcelain dolls is made in Jane's image. Meanwhile, her shy older sister, Blanche, lives in her shadow. Treated with contempt by the haughty Jane and with cruel dismissal by her father, Blanche is given weak apologies by her mother.

As the sisters reach adulthood, their situations reverse. Jane's performance falls out of fashion, and her career declines as she descends into alcoholism; Blanche becomes an acclaimed Hollywood actress. Mindful of a promise to their mother, Blanche attempts to maintain a career for Jane, prevailing on her film's producers to guarantee acting roles for Jane. One evening in 1935, Blanche's career is cut short when she is paralyzed from the waist down in a mysterious car accident that is unofficially blamed on Jane, who is found three days later in a drunken stupor.

By 1962, Blanche and Jane live together in a mansion purchased with Blanche's film earnings. Blanche's mobility is limited by reliance on a wheelchair and the lack of an elevator to her upstairs bedroom. Jane has become a grotesque, mentally unstable alcoholic who regularly abuses Blanche. When Blanche's old films begin airing on television, renewing her popularity among her fans, Jane becomes increasingly jealous and resentful. She fixates on the success and adoration she once had as a child star, deciding to revive her old act with hired pianist Edwin Flagg. When Blanche informs Jane she intends to sell the house, Jane correctly suspects Blanche will commit her to a psychiatric hospital once the house is sold. She removes the telephone from Blanche's bedroom, cutting her off from the outside world.

During Jane's absence, Blanche desperately drags herself down the stairs and calls her doctor for help. Jane returns to find Blanche on the phone, beating her unconscious before mimicking Blanche's voice to dismiss the doctor. Abruptly firing the housekeeper, Elvira, Jane ties Blanche to her bed and locks her in her room. While Jane is away, the suspicious Elvira sneaks into the house and attempts to access Blanche's room. Concerned by the lack of a response, Elvira starts to remove the door's hinge pins with a hammer. Upon returning home and being threatened with a call to authorities, Jane reluctantly gives Elvira the key. As Elvira enters Blanche's room, Jane strikes and kills Elvira with the hammer. Edwin comes by the house, but Jane refuses to answer the door. That night, she uses Blanche's wheelchair to move Elvira's body to her car.

A few days later, the police inform Jane that Elvira's cousin has reported her missing. Jane panics and prepares to leave, taking Blanche with her. Before they can go, police escort an inebriated Edwin to the house and leave him there. Upon discovering Blanche bound to her bed, Edwin flees and notifies the authorities. In a fit of infantile regression, Jane takes Blanche to a beach where she sang as a child.

The next morning, the radio news reports Elvira's murder and Blanche's condition, and the police are on the lookout. Weakened and near death, Blanche confesses to Jane that she caused her own accident. On the night in question, angry with her drunken sister for mocking her at a party, Blanche tried to run Jane over. Blanche's spine broke when her car struck the gates outside their mansion, and she dragged herself in front of the car's hood to stage the accident and frame Jane. Blanche took advantage of Jane's shock and subsequent bender, concealing the real cause of the accident from her, which subjected Jane to a life of guilt, loneliness, and servitude.

Now aware of the truth, a saddened Jane responds, "You mean all this time, we could have been friends?". When Jane gets them ice cream from a nearby refreshment stand, two police officers recognize her, asking her to lead them to Blanche. Attracting the attention of nearby beachgoers, Jane dodges the officers' inquiry and dances before the crowd of curious onlookers. The officers find Blanche nearby, rushing to attempt to save her.

== Cast ==
- Bette Davis as Jane Hudson
  - Julie Allred as 9-year-old Jane
  - Debbie Burton as young Jane's singing voice
- Joan Crawford as Blanche Hudson
  - Gina Gillespie as 13-year-old Blanche
- Victor Buono as Edwin Flagg
- Wesley Addy as Marty McDonald
- Anne Barton as Cora Hudson (credited as Ann Barton)
- Marjorie Bennett as Dehlia Flagg
- Bert Freed as Ben Golden
- Anna Lee as Mrs. Bates
- Maidie Norman as Elvira Stitt
- Dave Willock as Ray Hudson
- Ernest Anderson as Ernie the ice-cream vendor
- Russ Conway as police officer
- Maxine Cooper as bank teller
- Robert Cornthwaite as Doctor Shelby
- Michael Fox as TV commercial man
- B. D. Merrill as Liza Bates
- Don Ross as police officer
- James Seay as police officer
- John Shay as police officer
- Jon Shepodd as police officer
- Peter Virgo as police officer
- Bobs Watson as clerk in newspaper classified ad department

== Production ==
=== Development ===
Henry Farrell's novel, What Ever Happened to Baby Jane? was announced for publication on March 3, 1960. Three weeks later, producer Richard Rush was in talks to acquire the film rights, intending to cast Hugh O'Brian, Agnes Moorehead, and Jennifer West. However, the project stalled until September 1961, when Robert Aldrich came on board as director for producer Joseph E. Levine's Embassy Pictures. Funding was secured through Seven Arts Productions, with Warner Bros. Pictures handling distribution.

=== Casting ===
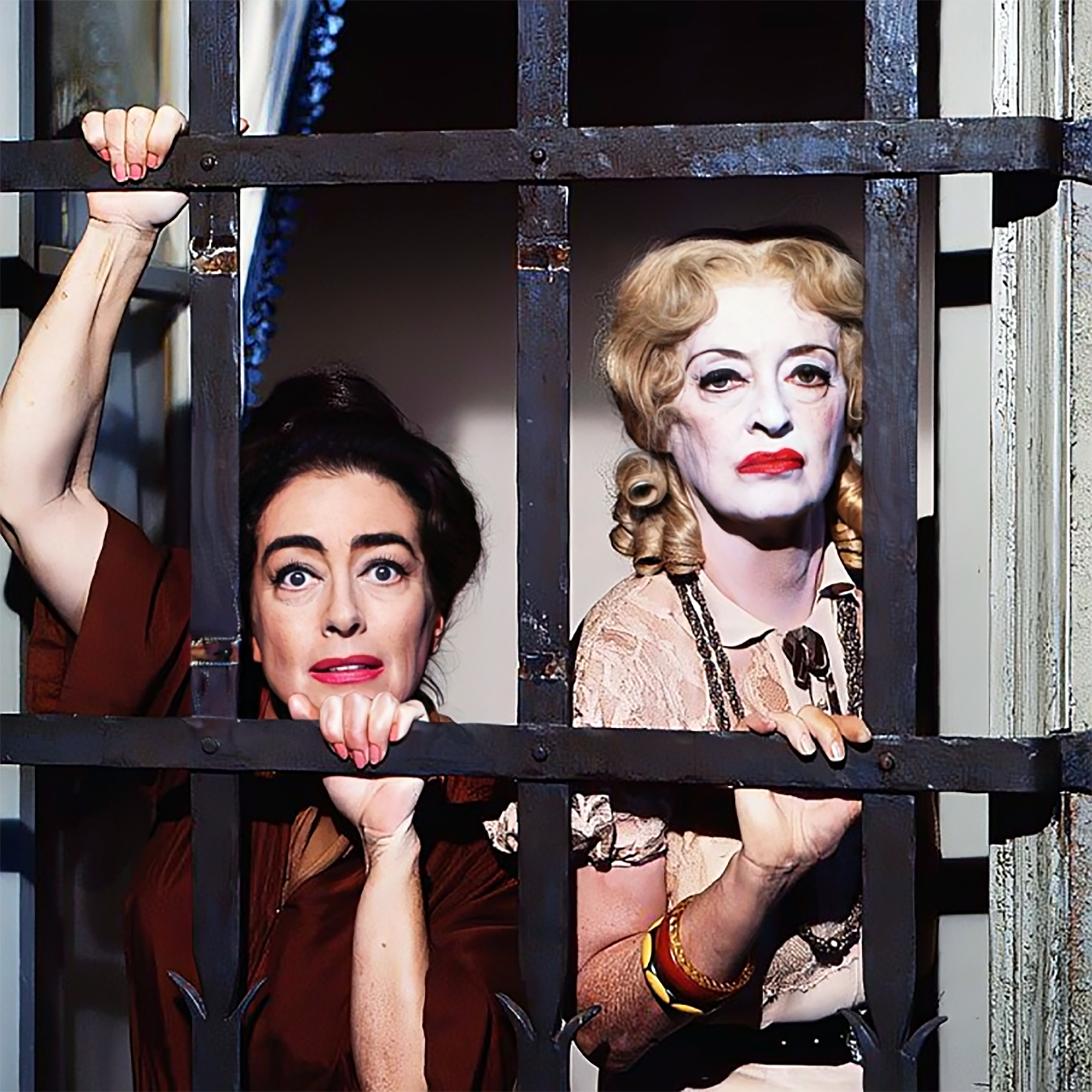
Joan Crawford (left) and Bette Davis (right) in a colorized press photo for the film

Joan Crawford discussed with Aldrich the idea of starring in a movie with Bette Davis. The two struggled to find a suitable project until they agreed on an adaptation of Farrell's novel. Aldrich commissioned Lukas Heller to write the script, and Crawford met with Aldrich on October 4, 1961, to discuss her role, which would mark her return to the screen after several years. Davis was cast in January 1962 and departed the cast of the Broadway show Night of the Iguana in March, taking a brief hiatus before rehearsals began in Los Angeles. Davis was reportedly "apprehensive" about the project as she disliked horror films, but she decided to take the role because "she loved the script and needed the money."

Victor Buono secured the role of "Edwin Flagg" after making a connection at the Golden Door spa in San Marcos, California. His brief appearance in the film marked the beginning of his career as a character actor, as reported by the Los Angeles Times. The character of Liza, Mrs. Bates' daughter, was played by Davis's real-life daughter B. D. Merrill.

=== Filming ===
Filming occurred at the Producers Studio, later renamed Raleigh Studios, in Los Angeles, beginning on July 9, 1962. Originally budgeted at $600,000 and slated for completion within thirty days, the production's costs eventually rose to approximately $800,000. By the end of the film's production, Aldrich indicated the final cost was $1,025,000. On July 21, 1962, studio head Jack L. Warner hosted a press luncheon to celebrate Davis and Crawford and to publicize the start of production.

Aldrich mentioned that both actresses were offered generous salaries, albeit below their standard rates. To compensate, Davis received ten percent of net profits and Crawford fifteen percent, resulting in earnings exceeding $500,000 after successful box-office returns. Despite Davis' confidence in the film, she likened receiving payment based on net profits to gambling.

Filming ran behind schedule, with completion expected in September. Despite this, Warner Bros. moved the release date from December to November 1962. Principal photography was completed on September 12, 1962. The Writers Guild of America rejected writer Harry Essex's request for screenplay credit, as he argued that his stage play, also adapted from the novel, influenced Heller. In 1963, it was noted that Warner executive vice-president Benjamin Kalmenson recommended releasing the film after it was rejected by other studios. Ken Hyman of Seven Arts also claimed credit, stating that he threatened to resign unless his company financed the project. Seven Arts recouped the production expenses within the initial eleven days of the film's premiere in New York City.

Footage from the Bette Davis films Parachute Jumper and Ex-Lady (both 1933) and the Joan Crawford film Sadie McKee (1934) was used to represent the film acting of Jane and Blanche, respectively.

==== Alleged on-set feuds ====
Rumors of Davis and Crawford clashing on set were widely reported for years, with Davis allegedly having struck Crawford's head during the filming of the scene in which Jane catches Blanche downstairs on the phone with the doctor. Another incident is supposed to have involved Crawford weighing down her robe, resulting in Davis straining her back after filming the scene in which Jane drags Blanche across the floor. Davis also disapproved of Crawford's alleged drinking during the shoot.

During filming in September 1962, Hedda Hopper mentioned hosting Crawford and Davis at her home for "an interview dinner." Crawford dismissed rumors of a feud between herself and Davis, expressing her desire to collaborate with her co-star since 1944 when they were both under contract to Warner Bros. Producer William Frye had recommended the source novel to Davis in 1960 but could not secure the rights. Davis then offered the story to Alfred Hitchcock, who had prior commitments. Variety quoted Davis from a television interview, stating that the two women had "too much pride to quarrel." Another report from Variety in August 1962 confirmed the friendly atmosphere on set. As a Pepsi-Cola Company board member, Crawford supplied the soft drink to the cast and crew throughout the shoot, although Aldrich occasionally brought bottles of Coca-Cola as a prank.

In a 1972 telephone conversation, Crawford told author Shaun Considine that after seeing the film she urged Davis to go and have a look. When she failed to hear back from her co-star, Crawford called Davis and asked her what she thought of the film. Davis replied, "You were so right, Joan. The picture is good. And I was terrific." Crawford said, "That was it. She never said anything about my performance. Not a word." During the filming of Hush...Hush, Sweet Charlotte (1964), Crawford acknowledged to visiting reporter and author Lawrence J. Quirk the difficulty she was having with Davis but added, "She acted like Baby Jane was a one-woman show after they nominated her. What was I supposed to do? Let her hog all the glory, act like I hadn't even been in the movie? She got the nomination. I didn't begrudge her that, but it would have been nice if she'd been a little gracious in interviews and given me a little credit. I would've done so for her."

The alleged on-set feuding between the two actresses was documented in the 1989 book Bette and Joan: The Divine Feud, which later served as the basis for the anthology television series Feud (2017).

== Release ==
In August 1962, the Theatre Owners of America, concerned by the scarcity of Hollywood films outside holiday seasons, established a committee to organize "guaranteed bookings" and preview screenings. What Ever Happened to Baby Jane? became the first release to benefit from the program. By October, the National Screen Service began distributing "special theatre accessories" for the preview screenings.

What Ever Happened to Baby Jane? had its first official screening in Cincinnati on Halloween 1962. It opened in numerous cities the following week, including New York City on November 6, 1962, and Los Angeles on November 7, 1962. Davis embarked on a three-day tour of New York City that week, participating in seventeen screenings, one of which featured a children's marching band welcoming her with "When the Saints Go Marching In." She expressed her preference for film over live theater to reporters and humorously advertised her availability to Hollywood studios in trade publications. She worked with singer Debbie Burton to record the song "Whatever Happened to Baby Jane," which appeared among the week's top singles in Variety. Davis later credited the film with "resuscitating" her film career.

In the United Kingdom, the film was given an X certificate by the British Board of Film Classification (BBFC) in 1962, with a few minor cuts. These cuts were waived for a video submission, which was given an 18 certificate in 1988, meaning no one under 18 years of age could purchase a copy of the film. However, in 2004, the film was re-submitted for a theatrical re-release, and it was given a 12A certificate, now meaning persons under 12 years of age could view it if accompanied by an adult. It remains at this category to this day.

=== Home media ===
Warner Home Video released What Ever Happened to Baby Jane? on VHS in a clamshell package in 1983.

Warner first released the film on DVD in 1997, followed by a two-disc special edition DVD in 2006. The film was reissued on DVD and Blu-ray on October 9, 2012, in celebration of its fiftieth anniversary. The Warner Archive Collection reissued the film on Blu-ray on July 30, 2019.

== Reception ==
=== Box office ===
What Ever Happened to Baby Jane? was a box-office hit. During the week of November 21, 1962, it was the second-highest earning film release in the United States, and had fully recouped its production cost by November 18, 1962. By February 1963, the film had earned gross receipts of $4 million. It ultimately went on to gross a total of $9 million in theatrical rentals in North America, giving both Bette Davis and Joan Crawford their biggest hit in over a decade.

=== Critical response ===
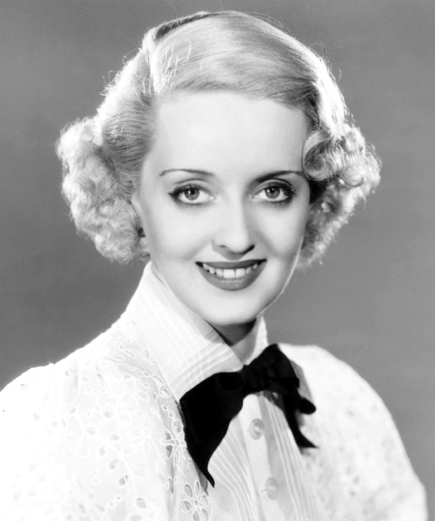
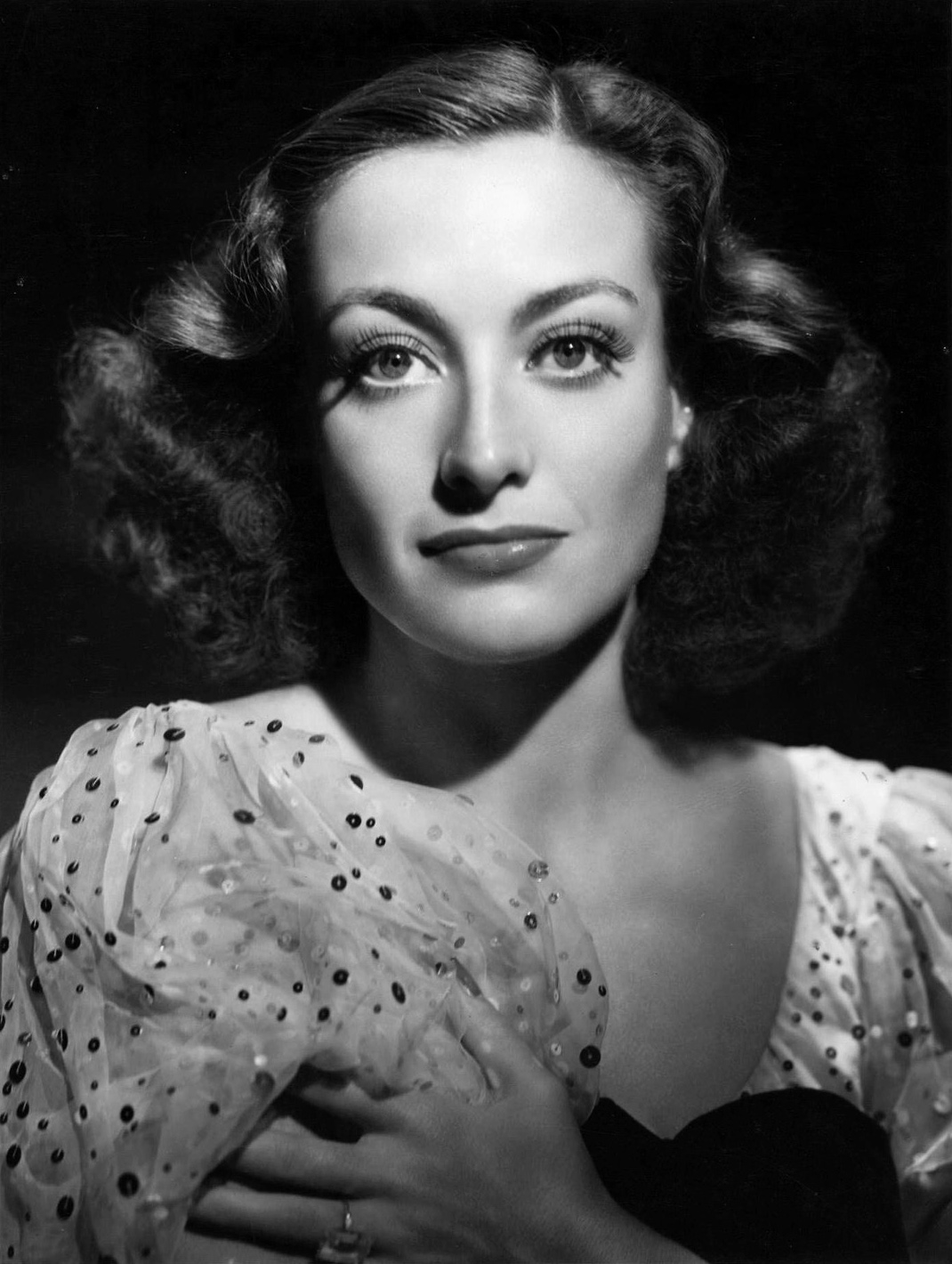
Bette Davis (left) and Joan Crawford (right) credited the film as helping revive their careers

Contemporary reviews were mixed. In a generally negative review in The New York Times, Bosley Crowther observed, "[Davis and Crawford] do get off some amusing and eventually blood-chilling displays of screaming sororal hatred and general monstrousness ... The feeble attempts that Mr. Aldrich has made to suggest the irony of two once idolized and wealthy females living in such depravity, and the pathos of their deep-seated envy having brought them to this, wash out very quickly under the flood of sheer grotesquerie. There is nothing moving or particularly significant about these two." Philip K. Scheuer of the Los Angeles Times also panned the film, writing that Crawford and Davis had been turned into "grotesque caricatures of themselves" and that the film "mocks not only its characters but also the sensibilities of its audience." Mae Tinee of the Chicago Tribune wrote, "This isn't a movie, it's a caricature. Bette Davis' make-up could very well have been done by Charles Addams, Joan Crawford's perils make those of Pauline look like good, clean fun and the plot piles one fantastic twist upon another until it all becomes nonsensical." Brendan Gill of The New Yorker was somewhat negative as well, calling the film "far from being a Hitchcock—it goes on and on, in a light much dimmer than necessary, and the climax, when it belatedly arrives, is a bungled, languid mingling of pursuers and pursued which put me in mind of Last Year at Marienbad. Still, Bette Davis and Joan Crawford do get a chance to carry on like mad things, which at least one of them is supposed to be."

Among the positive reviews, Variety stated that after a slow and overlong introduction the film became "an emotional toboggan ride," adding, "Although the results heavily favor Davis (and she earns the credit), it should be recognized that the plot, of necessity, allows her to run unfettered through all the stages of oncoming insanity ... Crawford gives a quiet, remarkably fine interpretation of the crippled Blanche, held in emotionally by the nature and temperament of the role." Richard L. Coe of The Washington Post also liked the film, writing that "Miss Davis has the showiest role and bites into it with all her admired force, looking a fright from head to foot. I doubt if she would regret some of the laughs she gets. She plays for them and psychologically, they are needed. If Miss Crawford has the passive role, that is not without rewards. Suffering is one of her particular gifts." The Monthly Film Bulletin wrote that numerous directorial techniques, including all the plunging shots down the staircase, made the film look "rather like an anthology of the oldest and most hackneyed devices in thrillerdom. And yet, in its curious Gothic way, the film works marvelously, though mainly as a field-day for its actors."

In Sight & Sound, Peter John Dyer stated that the film had "a frequent air of incompetence," writing of Aldrich's direction that "Like some textbook student of Hitchcock who never got beyond Blackmail, he dispenses suspense with ham-fisted conventionality." Dyer did praise the performances of the leads, however, finding that they seemed to have found "a new maturity, a discipline encouraged perhaps by the confined sets and Crawford's wheelchair, or by the interaction of their professional rivalry upon a belated mutual respect."

More recent assessments have been more uniformly positive. On the review aggregator website Rotten Tomatoes, 91% of 53 critics' reviews are positive. The website's consensus reads: "What Ever Happened to Baby Jane? combines powerhouse acting, rich atmosphere, and absorbing melodrama in service of a taut thriller with thought-provoking subtext." Metacritic, which uses a weighted average, assigned the film a score of 75 out of 100, based on 15 critics, indicating "generally favorable" reviews. In a retrospective review, TV Guide awarded the film four stars, calling it "Star wars, trenchantly served" and adding, "If it sometimes looks like a poisonous senior citizen show with over-the-top spoiled ham, just try to look away ... As in the best Hitchcock movies, suspense, rather than actual mayhem, drives the film."

The Japanese filmmaker Akira Kurosawa cited What Ever Happened to Baby Jane? as one of his favorite films.

=== Accolades ===
Award/association	Year	Category	Recipient(s) and nominee(s)	Result	Ref.
Academy Awards	1963	Best Actress	Bette Davis	Nominated	
Academy Awards	1963	Best Supporting Actor	Victor Buono	Nominated	
Academy Awards	1963	Best Cinematography – Black-and-White	Ernest Haller	Nominated	
Academy Awards	1963	Best Costume Design – Black-and-White	Norma Koch	Won	
Academy Awards	1963	Best Sound	Joseph D. Kelly	Nominated	
British Academy Film Awards	1963	Best Foreign Actress	Joan Crawford	Nominated	
British Academy Film Awards	1963	Best Foreign Actress	Bette Davis	Nominated	
Cannes Film Festival	1963	Palme d'Or	Robert Aldrich	Nominated	
Directors Guild of America Awards	1963	Outstanding Directorial Achievement in Motion Pictures	Robert Aldrich	Nominated	
Golden Globe Awards	1963	Best Actress in a Motion Picture – Drama	Bette Davis	Nominated	
Golden Globe Awards	1963	Best Supporting Actor – Motion Picture	Victor Buono	Nominated	
Laurel Awards	1963	Sleeper of the Year	What Ever Happened to Baby Jane?	Won	
Laurel Awards	1963	Top Female Dramatic Performance	Bette Davis	Nominated	
Online Film & Television Association Awards		Hall of Fame Award	What Ever Happened to Baby Jane?	Won	

== Legacy ==
The film's success spawned a succession of unrelated horror and thriller films featuring psychotic older women, later dubbed the "psycho-biddy" or "hagsploitation" subgenre. Among them are Aldrich's subsequent film which also starred Davis, Hush...Hush, Sweet Charlotte (1964); Lee H. Katzin's What Ever Happened to Aunt Alice? (1969); Curtis Harrington's Whoever Slew Auntie Roo? (1972) and What's the Matter with Helen? (1971).

What Ever Happened to Baby Jane? has been noted in the years since its release for its camp appeal. Steffen Hantke writes in Horror Film: Creating and Marketing Fear (2004) notes that the film's "camp effect of the film derives from the ways that the performances of Davis and Crawford are so intertwined with a specifically Hollywood brand of glamour. These two recognizable women are performing with the hyperbole of 1940s stars in a 1960s film." Judy Berman of Vice Media commented on the film's association with camp in 2017: "That Baby Jane is so often treated as pure camp while films with just as many goofy elements—like Hitchcock’s Psycho—end up on lists of the all-time greatest horror flicks probably comes down to sexism... Few films blur the line between “cult classic” and “canonical masterpiece” as thoroughly as What Ever Happened to Baby Jane?."

In 2021, the film was selected for preservation in the United States National Film Registry by the Library of Congress as being "culturally, historically, or aesthetically significant."

=== Related works ===
In 1991, the film was remade as a television film starring real-life sisters Vanessa and Lynn Redgrave.

Author Shaun Considine chronicled the alleged rivalry between Davis and Crawford, including their experience shooting this film, in the 1989 book Bette and Joan: The Divine Feud. Their broadly fictionalized backstage battle during the production of the film was also the basis for Ryan Murphy's 2017 miniseries Feud, which starred Jessica Lange as Crawford and Susan Sarandon as Davis. The alleged rivalry was also dramatized for BBC Radio 4 as Bette and Joan and Baby Jane (2010), starring Catherine Tate as Davis and Tracy-Ann Oberman as Crawford.

=== Cultural references ===
The film was parodied by the Italian comedy film What Ever Happened to Baby Toto? (1964).

In the Warner Bros.-produced horror film House of Wax (2005), What Ever Happened to Baby Jane? is shown screening on a continuous loop in a movie theater.

In 2000, Episode 20 of season 1 of Popular parodied the film in a dream, titling it "What Even Happened to Sam McPherson?".

In 2006, Christina Aguilera adopted a new alter ego called Baby Jane after Bette Davis' character in the film.

In season 2, episode 4 of RuPaul's Drag Race All Stars, the contestants were challenged to make parody sequels of RuPaul's favorite films. A parody of ''What Ever Happened to Baby Jane?'' called ''Wha' Ha' Happened to Baby JJ?'' was made by Alaska (as Davis) and Alyssa Edwards (as Crawford). Alaska won the challenge while Alyssa Edwards was eliminated.

Inspired by the film, British comedy duo Dawn French and Jennifer Saunders created the episode "Whatever Happened to Baby Dawn?" (1990) of their BBC sketch comedy series, and also starred in a radio series (written by David Quantick) about feuding sisters called Whatever Happened To Baby Jane Austen (2021).

In the film Space Jam: A New Legacy (2021), Baby Jane Hudson makes an appearance as a spectator watching the Tune Squad battle the Goon Squad.

The 2026 SpongeBob SquarePants episode "What Ever Happened to Baby Prunes?" (season 17, episode 7b) is a parody of the film.

== See also ==
- List of films featuring psychopaths and sociopaths

== Sources ==
- Anile, Alberto (1998). I film di Totò (1946–1967): La Maschera Tradita (in Italian). Recco, Genova, Italy: Le mani. ISBN 978-8-880-12080-3.
- Bubbeo, Daniel (2010). The Women of Warner Brothers: The Lives and Careers of 15 Leading Ladies, with Filmographies for Each. Jefferson, North Carolina: McFarland & Company. ISBN 978-0-786-46236-0.
- Chandler, Charlotte (2006). The Girl Who Walked Home Alone: Bette Davis A Personal Biography. New York City, New York: Applause Books. ISBN 978-1-557-83717-2.
- Considine, Shaun (1989). Bette and Joan. New York City, New York: E.P. Dutton. ISBN 978-0-525-24770-8.
- Grant, Barry Keith (2022). 100 American Horror Films. London, England: British Film Institute. ISBN 978-1-839-02144-2.
- Hantke, Steffen (2004). Horror Film: Creating and Marketing Fear. Jackson, Mississippi: Univ. Press of Mississippi. ISBN 978-1-578-06692-6.
- Higham, George (2020). Wax Museum Movies: A Comprehensive Filmography. Jefferson, North Carolina: McFarland & Company. ISBN 978-1-476-64011-2.
- McNally, Peter (2008). Bette Davis: The Performances That Made Her Great. Jefferson, North Carolina: McFarland & Company. ISBN 978-0-786-43499-2.
- Quirk, Lawrence J.; Schoell, William (2002). Joan Crawford: The Essential Biography. Lexington, Kentucky: University Press of Kentucky. ISBN 978-0-813-12254-0.
- Silver, Alain; Ursini, James (1995). What Ever Happened to Robert Aldrich?. New York City, New York: Limelight Editions. ISBN 978-0-879-10185-5.
