= Norma Koch =

American costume designer (1898–1979)

- Born: March 27, 1898
- Died: July 29, 1979 (aged 81); Jamaica, New York
- Occupation: Costume designer
- Years active: 1946-1972

Norma Koch (March 27, 1898 – July 29, 1979) was an American costume designer, usually credited as Norma, who won the Oscar for the film What Ever Happened to Baby Jane? in the category Best Costume design-Black and White during the 1962 Academy Awards.

She received two more Oscar nominations, her secondduring the 1964 Academy Awards for the film Hush...Hush, Sweet Charlotte, also for Best Costume design-Black and White. Her third nomination was at the 1972 Academy Awards for the film Lady Sings the Blues in the category of Best Costumes.

== Selected filmography ==
- Lady Sings the Blues (1972)
- The Flight of the Phoenix (1965)
- Hush...Hush, Sweet Charlotte (1964)
- Taras Bulba (1962)
- What Ever Happened to Baby Jane? (1962)
- Sayonara (1957)
- Marty (1955)
- Vera Cruz (1954)
- Invaders From Mars (1953)
