= Bette and Joan: The Divine Feud =

1989 American biography

- Author: Shaun Considine
- Subject: Bette Davis, Joan Crawford
- Publication date: 1989

Bette and Joan: The Divine Feud is an American biography by Shaun Considine first published in 1989 and re-released in 2017 by Graymalkin Media in paperback and as an e-book.

The biography focuses on the celebrated, long-term feud of Hollywood's two iconic screen legends, Bette Davis and Joan Crawford.

The Crawford-Davis rivalry was dramatized in the 2017 FX anthology television series Feud, titled Bette and Joan and starring Susan Sarandon and Jessica Lange.
