= Joseph D. Kelly (sound engineer) =

American sound engineer

- Died: September 21, 2006
- Occupation: Sound engineer
- Years active: 1962

Joseph D. Kelly (died September 21, 2006) was an American sound engineer. He was nominated for an Academy Award for the film What Ever Happened to Baby Jane? in the category Sound Recording.

== Selected filmography ==
- What Ever Happened to Baby Jane? (1962)
