= Hush...Hush, Sweet Charlotte =

1964 film by Robert Aldrich

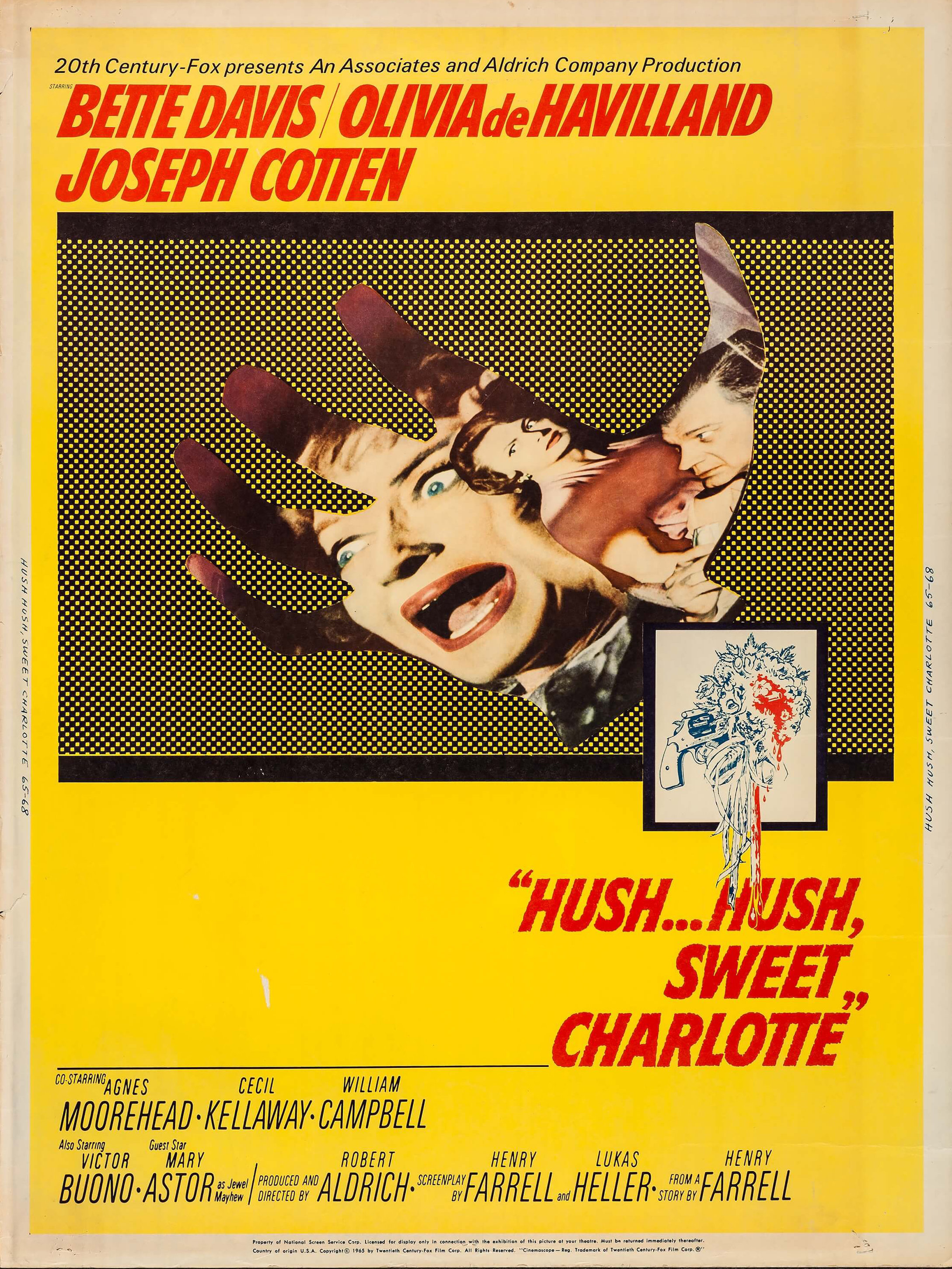
- Theatrical release poster
- Directed by: Robert Aldrich
- Screenplay by: Henry Farrell; Lukas Heller
- Based on: "What Ever Happened to Cousin Charlotte?" by Henry Farrell
- Produced by: Robert Aldrich
- Starring: Bette Davis; Olivia de Havilland; Joseph Cotten; Agnes Moorehead; Cecil Kellaway; Mary Astor
- Cinematography: Joseph Biroc
- Edited by: Michael Luciano
- Music by: Frank De Vol
- Production companies: The Associates and Aldrich
- Distributed by: 20th Century-Fox
- Release date: December 16, 1964
- Running time: 133 minutes
- Country: United States
- Language: English
- Budget: $2.2 million
- Box office: $4 million (rentals)

Hush...Hush, Sweet Charlotte is a 1964 American psychological horror thriller film directed and produced by Robert Aldrich, and starring Bette Davis, Olivia de Havilland, Joseph Cotten, Agnes Moorehead, and Mary Astor in her final film role. It follows a middle-aged Southern woman, suspected in the unsolved murder of her lover from decades before, who is plagued by bizarre occurrences after summoning her cousin to help challenge the local government's impending demolition of her home. The screenplay was adapted by Henry Farrell and Lukas Heller, from Farrell's unpublished short story "What Ever Happened to Cousin Charlotte?"

Following his previous success adapting Farrell's novel What Ever Happened to Baby Jane?, Aldrich originally cast the film to reunite Davis with Joan Crawford, despite their notorious turbulence on set. Principal photography began with Davis in the title role and Crawford as Miriam, but shooting was postponed, and ultimately Crawford was replaced and the role was recast with de Havilland. The film was a critical success, earning seven Academy Award nominations.

== Plot ==
In 1927, young Southern belle Charlotte Hollis and her married lover John Mayhew plan to elope during a party at the Hollis family's antebellum mansion in Ascension Parish, Louisiana. Charlotte's father, Sam, confronts John over the affair and intimidates him with the news that John's wife Jewel visited the day before and revealed the affair. John pretends to Charlotte he can no longer love her and that they must part. Shortly after, John is ambushed and decapitated in the summerhouse by an assailant with a cleaver. Charlotte returns to the house in a bloodstained dress, which all of the guests witness.

Thirty-seven years later, Charlotte, a spinster, having inherited the estate after her father died in 1928, is tended to by her loyal housekeeper, Velma. In the intervening years, John's death has remained an unsolved murder, though it is commonly held that Charlotte was responsible. Despite notice from the Louisiana Highway Commission that she has been evicted from the property to make way for the impending construction of a new interstate, Charlotte is defiant and threatens the demolition crew with a rifle. Seeking help in her fight against the Highway Commission, Charlotte summons Miriam, her successful businesswoman cousin who lived with the family as a girl but has since moved to New York City. Miriam returns and soon renews her relationship with Drew Bayliss, a local doctor who walked out on her, in fear of his name being linked to the scandal. Charlotte's sanity soon deteriorates following Miriam's arrival, her nights haunted by a mysterious harpsichord playing the song John wrote for her and by the appearance of his disembodied hand and head. Suspecting that Miriam and Drew are after Charlotte's money, Velma seeks help from Mr. Willis, an insurance investigator from England who is still fascinated by the case and who has visited John's ailing widow, Jewel; she gave him an envelope to be opened only after her death.

Miriam fires Velma, who later returns to discover Charlotte has been drugged. Velma plans to expose Miriam's exploitation of Charlotte, but Miriam hits Velma with a chair and she falls down the stairs to her death. Drew covers up the murder by declaring it an accident. One night, a drugged Charlotte runs downstairs in the grip of a hallucination, believing that John has returned to her. After Miriam tricks the intoxicated Charlotte into shooting Drew with a gun loaded with blanks, the two dispose of his body in a swamp. Charlotte returns to the house and witnesses the revived Drew walking downstairs after he returned, reducing her to insanity. Believing she has shattered Charlotte's mental state, Miriam celebrates with Drew in the garden, where they discuss the plan to have Charlotte committed to a psychiatric hospital and usurp her fortune. Charlotte overhears the entire conversation from the balcony, except for Miriam's admission that she had witnessed Jewel kill John, and has been using the knowledge to blackmail Jewel throughout the years. Charlotte pushes a large stone urn off the balcony, killing both Miriam and Drew below.

The next day, the authorities escort Charlotte from home as a crowd gathers to observe the spectacle. Charlotte receives an envelope from Mr. Willis, which he received from Jewel (who died of a stroke after hearing of the incident which occurred on the previous night), ostensibly confessing to the murder of her husband John. As the authorities leave with Charlotte, she looks back at the house.

== Cast ==
- Bette Davis as Charlotte Hollis
- Olivia de Havilland as Miriam Deering
- Joseph Cotten as Doctor Drew Bayliss
- Agnes Moorehead as Velma Cruther
- Cecil Kellaway as Harry Willis
- Mary Astor as Jewel Mayhew
- Victor Buono as Big Sam Hollis
- Wesley Addy as Sheriff Luke Standish
- William Campbell as Paul Marchand
- Bruce Dern as John Mayhew
- Frank Ferguson as editor
- George Kennedy as the demolition foreman
- Percy Helton as funeral director
- Carol Delay as Geraldine
- Idell James as Ginny Mae
- Robert Adler as Mr. Howard
- Ellen Corby, Marianne Stewart and Helen Kleeb as the town gossips
- Lillian Randolph, Geraldine West and Maye Henderson as the packing women

== Production ==
=== Development and casting ===
Following the unexpected box office success of What Ever Happened to Baby Jane? (1962), Aldrich wanted to make a film with similar themes for Joan Crawford and Bette Davis. Their feud was infamous and legendary, and they were not initially eager to repeat themselves. Writer Henry Farrell, on whose novel the film had been based, had written an unpublished short story called "What Ever Happened to Cousin Charlotte?" that Aldrich envisioned as a suitable follow-up. It told a similar story of a woman who manipulates a relative for personal gain, but for this film, Aldrich's idea was that the two actresses would switch the roles from the previous one, with Crawford playing the devious cousin trying to manipulate the innocent Davis into giving up her estate. Aldrich's frequent collaborator, Lukas Heller, wrote a draft of the screenplay, but was replaced by Farrell in late 1963.

Three other cast members from What Ever Happened to Baby Jane? were cast in Hush...Hush, Sweet Charlotte: Wesley Addy, Dave Willock and Victor Buono.

The cast included Mary Astor, a friend of Davis' since their days at Warner Bros. Astor retired from acting and died in 1987. She said:

My agent called: 'There's this cameo in a movie with Bette Davis. It's a hell of a part; it could put you right up there again.' I read the script. The opening shot described a severed head rolling down the stairs, and each page contained more blood and gore and hysterics and cracked mirrors and everybody being awful to everybody else. I skipped to my few pages–a little old lady sitting on her veranda waiting to die. There was a small kicker to it inasmuch as it was she who was the murderess in her youth and had started all the trouble. And then in the story, she died. Good! Now, I'd really be dead! And it was with Bette–which seemed sentimentally fitting.

=== Filming ===
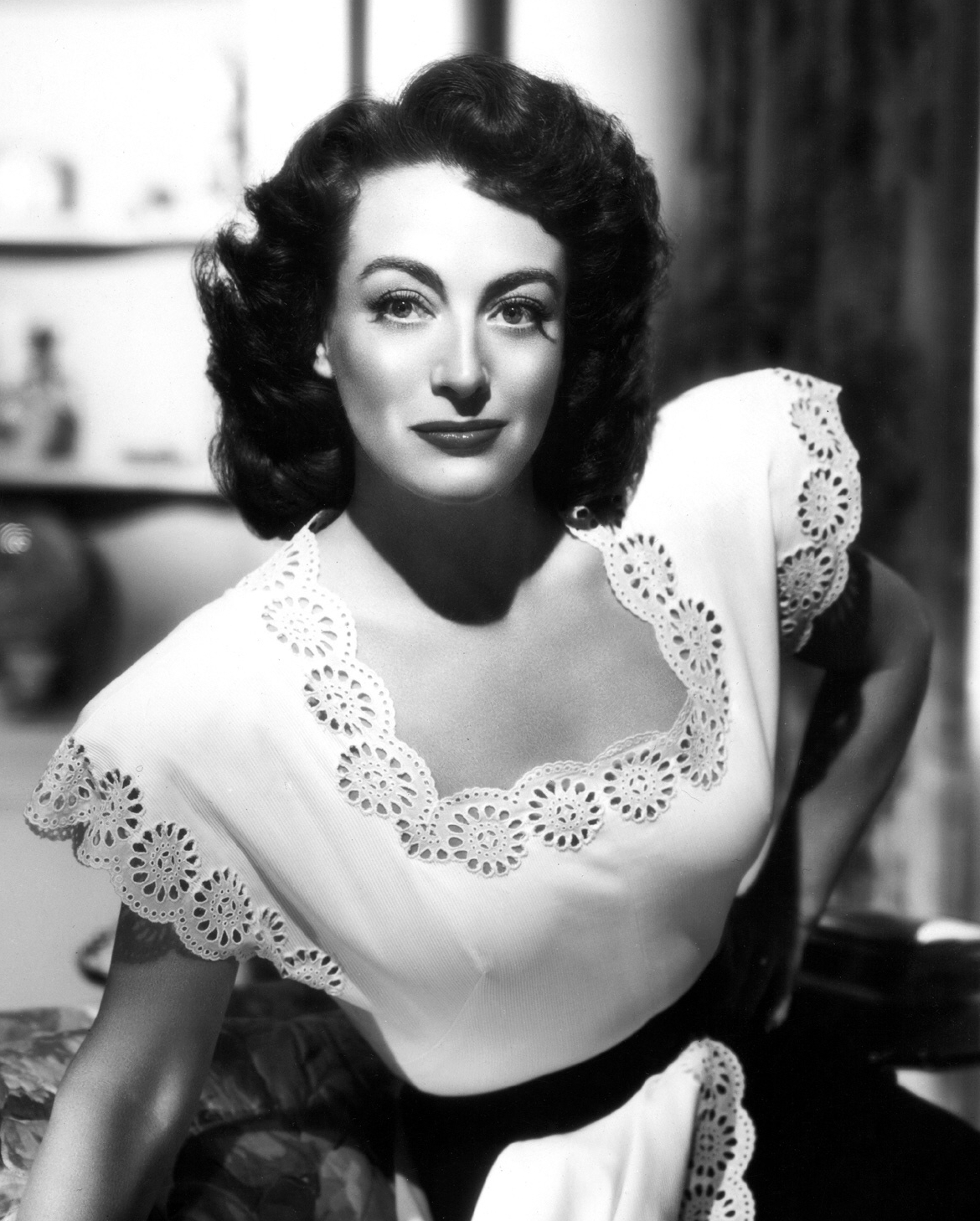
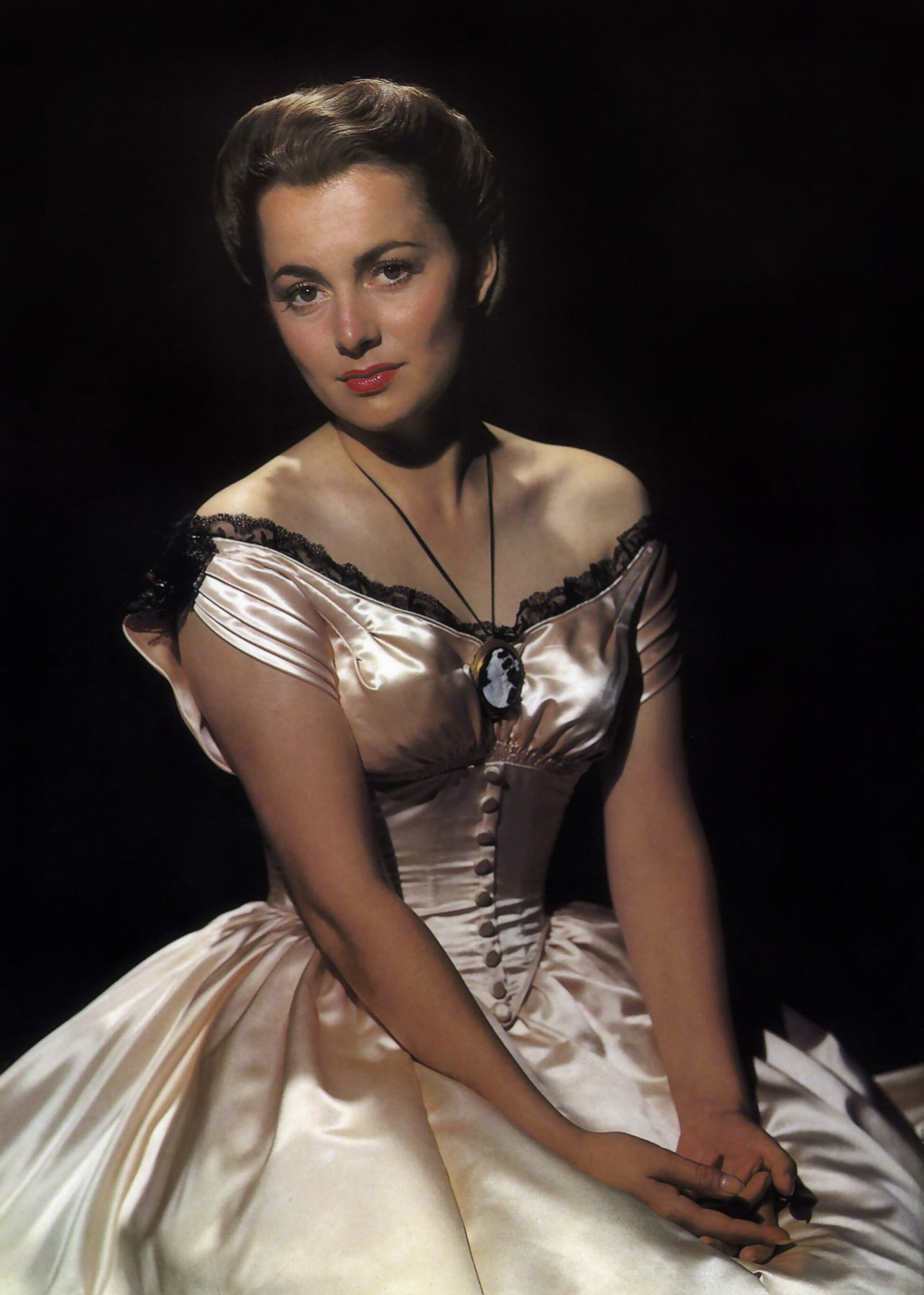
Joan Crawford (left) was replaced by Olivia de Havilland (right) on August 24, 1964.

Principal photography of the film began on May 18, 1964, with on-location shooting in Baton Rouge, Louisiana commencing on June 1. However, the shoot was temporarily suspended on several occasions early on. Initially, it was halted after a third-party lawsuit was brought against Davis by Paramount Pictures over a commitment to complete additional filming on Where Love Has Gone (1964). When this was resolved, filming recommenced.

The production was postponed again to allow Crawford to recover after she was admitted into the hospital due to an upper respiratory ailment, though Aldrich hired a private investigator to track her and determine whether she was actually ill. By August 4, 1964, the production had been suspended indefinitely, and the studio's insurance company insisted that Crawford be replaced, or else the film would have to be cancelled entirely.

Aldrich sought several actresses to replace Crawford, including Loretta Young, and Vivien Leigh, but they were each either unable or unwilling to take the role. Aldrich ultimately sought Olivia de Havilland for the part, and flew to her home in Switzerland to attempt to convince her to take the role. De Havilland agreed and she subsequently flew to Los Angeles to begin filming. In later interviews, de Havilland expressed displeasure with the film: "I wasn't thrilled with the script, and I definitely didn't like my part. I was reverse-typecast, being asked to be an unsympathetic villain. It wasn't what people expected of me. It wasn't really what I wanted to do. Bette wanted it so much, so I did it. I can't say I regretted it, because working with her was special, but I can't say it was a picture I am proud to put on my resume. Given the choice, I wouldn't have deprived Joan Crawford of the honor." According to Crawford, she only learned of her firing from a news radio broadcast. However, despite being replaced (and because a planned reshoot with de Havilland in Louisiana was cancelled), brief footage of Crawford made it into the film, when she is seen sitting in the taxi in the wide shot for Miriam's arrival at the house (Crawford can be seen peering out of the window wearing dark sunglasses/clothing).

Scenes outside the Hollis mansion were shot on location at Houmas House and Oak Alley plantations in Louisiana. Scenes of the interior were shot on a soundstage in Hollywood.

=== Musical score ===
The title song by Frank de Vol became a hit for Patti Page, who recorded a version which reached no. 8 on the Billboard Hot 100.

== Release ==
=== Box office ===
According to Fox records, the film needed to earn $3,900,000 in rentals to break even and made $4,950,000, meaning it made a profit of $1,050,000. In France, the film sold 79,168 tickets.

=== Critical reception ===
Hush...Hush, Sweet Charlotte was another hit for Aldrich, opening to positive reviews. A pan, however, came from The New York Times. Bosley Crowther observed, "So calculated and coldly carpentered is the tale of murder, mayhem and deceit that Mr. Aldrich stages in this mansion that it soon appears grossly contrived, purposely sadistic and brutally sickening. So, instead of coming out funny, as did Whatever Happened to Baby Jane?, it comes out grisly, pretentious, disgusting and profoundly annoying."

Variety's reviewer wrote: "Davis' portrayal is reminiscent of Jane in its emotional overtones, in her style of characterization of the near-crazed former Southern belle, aided by haggard makeup and outlandish attire. It is an outgoing performance, and she plays it to the limit. De Havilland, on the other hand, is far more restrained but nonetheless effective dramatically in her offbeat role." Judith Crist wrote about the film, "The guignol is about as grand as it gets." Kenneth Tynan asserted that "(Davis) has done nothing better since The Little Foxes." A later review for Time Out (London) observed: "Over the top, of course, and not a lot to it, but it's efficiently directed, beautifully shot, and contains enough scary sequences amid the brooding, tense atmosphere. Splendid performances from Davis and Moorehead, too."

On the review aggregator website Rotten Tomatoes, 84% of 31 reviews are positive, with an average rating of 7.3/10.

=== Accolades ===
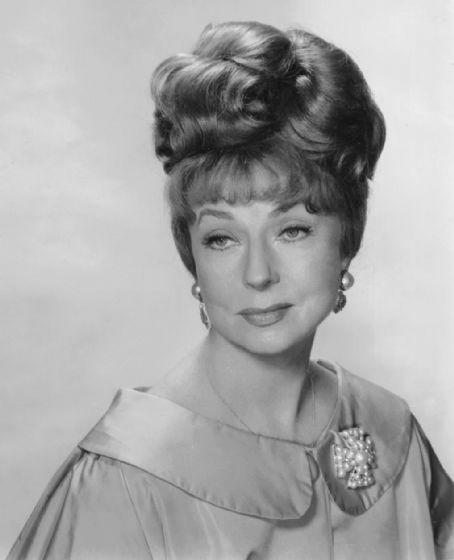
Agnes Moorehead won the Golden Globe for Best Supporting Actress for her performance as Velma, Charlotte's housekeeper.

Moorehead won the Golden Globe for Best Supporting Actress. The film also received seven nominations (two more than Baby Jane: one less in the acting category, namely for Davis) for the 37th Academy Awards, breaking the record as the most for a horror film up to that time.

Award	Year	Category	Nominee(s)	Result
Academy Awards	1965	Best Supporting Actress	Agnes Moorehead	Nominated
Academy Awards	1965	Best Art Direction – Black-and-White	Art Direction: William Glasgow; Set Decoration: Raphaël Bretton	Nominated
Academy Awards	1965	Best Cinematography – Black-and-White	Joseph Biroc	Nominated
Academy Awards	1965	Best Costume Design – Black-and-White	Norma Koch	Nominated
Academy Awards	1965	Best Film Editing	Michael Luciano	Nominated
Academy Awards	1965	Best Music Score – Substantially Original	Frank De Vol	Nominated
Academy Awards	1965	Best Song	"Hush, Hush, Sweet Charlotte"; Music by Frank De Vol; Lyrics by Mack David	Nominated
Edgar Awards	1965	Best Motion Picture	Henry Farrell and Lukas Heller	Won
Golden Globe Awards	1965	Best Supporting Actress – Motion Picture	Agnes Moorehead	Won
Laurel Awards	1965	Top Female Dramatic Performance	Bette Davis	Won
Laurel Awards	1965	Top Female Supporting Performance	Agnes Moorehead	Nominated
Laurel Awards	1965	Top Song	"Hush, Hush, Sweet Charlotte"; Music by Frank De Vol; Lyrics by Mack David	Nominated

=== Home media ===
The film was first released on DVD on August 9, 2005. It was re-released on April 8, 2008, as part of The Bette Davis Centenary Celebration Collection 5-DVD box-set. On October 17, 2016, It was released onto high-definition Blu-ray in the US by Twilight Time as a 3,000-print limited edition. Another Blu-ray edition was released in the UK by Eureka Entertainment as a part of their "Masters of Cinema" collection on January 21, 2019.

== See also ==
- List of American films of 1964
- Psycho-biddy

== Sources ==
- Silver, Alain; Ursini, James (1995). Whatever Happened to Robert Aldrich?. New York: Limelight. ISBN 978-0-879-10185-5.
- Solomon, Aubrey (1989). Twentieth Century Fox: A Corporate and Financial History. Lanham, Maryland: Scarecrow Press. ISBN 978-0-810-82147-7.
