= What Ever Happened to... =

- Genre: Drama; Thriller
- Based on: What Ever Happened to Baby Jane? by Henry Farrell
- Written by: Brian Taggert
- Directed by: David Greene
- Starring: Vanessa Redgrave; Lynn Redgrave
- Music by: Peter Manning Robinson
- Country of origin: United States
- Original language: English

Production
- Executive producer: William Aldrich
- Producer: Barry Bernardi
- Cinematography: Stevan Larner
- Editor: Paul Dixon
- Running time: 120 minutes
- Production company: Spectacor Films

Original release
- Network: ABC
- Release: February 17, 1991

What Ever Happened to... (also known as What Ever Happened to Baby Jane...?) is a 1991 American made-for-television thriller film directed by David Greene and adapted for the small screen by Brian Taggert. It is based on the 1960 novel What Ever Happened to Baby Jane? by Henry Farrell and the 1962 theatrical film of the same name. It stars real-life sisters Lynn Redgrave as Baby Jane Hudson and Vanessa Redgrave as Blanche Hudson, in the roles previously played by Bette Davis and Joan Crawford in the 1962 adaptation.

The film was adapted to contemporary times, with Blanche's film success taking place in the 1960s instead of the 1930s. Her films were being rediscovered on home video instead of television reruns. Jane had been a child film star (replacing the original's vaudeville success), though her films were unavailable, leading to her jealousy.

== Plot ==
In the 1940s, "Baby" Jane Hudson is a world-famous child star. Jane dominates her shy sister Blanche, who, as Jane's understudy and stunt double, longs to have an acting career of her own. By the 1960s, Blanche has become a serious and celebrated actress, while Jane's career fades into obscurity. Blanche's own career is ultimately cut short by a car accident that paralyzes her from the waist down, after which Jane was committed to a psychiatric hospital. Everyone believes that Jane, jealous of her sister's popularity, had run her over with her car and then gone insane with guilt.

In the present day, the aging sisters live together in a crumbling Brentwood mansion, where Jane, who still dresses herself in her old Baby Jane clothes and makeup, cares for the paraplegic Blanche. Blanche's films have recently become available on home video and television, launching her into a modest comeback. Jane resents both her sister's enduring popularity and her own role as caretaker and takes out her resentment on Blanche with vicious pranks. She intercepts all of the mail addressed to her sister, particularly fan letters, and constantly reminds Blanche that she never would have had a career if not for Jane's success. Blanche and her physical therapist, Dominick, worry that Jane's pranks might turn violent if she finds out Blanche is selling the house without her knowledge.

Hoping that she can also stage a comeback, Jane goes to a video store to see which of her old films are available on tape. Billy Korn, the store's owner, recognizes her as Baby Jane, much to her delight. Korn offers to manage her comeback and promises to arrange a spot in a talent show for $1,000. Jane agrees without realizing that he is a con artist only after her money.

Back at home, Blanche tries to call her sister's psychiatrist, only to have Jane overhear the conversation and then physically attack her. Blanche tries to escape, but Jane locks her in her upstairs bedroom with no means of communication. After being starved for days, Blanche rummages through Jane's bedroom drawers for food and discovers that she has been forging her signature on checks to steal her money. Dominick arrives for his physical therapy session and discovers that Jane has bound and gagged her sister with duct tape. As he is attempting to cut her loose, Jane stabs Dominick to death with a pair of scissors and hides his body in the basement screening room.

Jane is shocked to learn that the "talent show" Korn arranged is actually a drag revue, complete with Korn himself dressed as Blanche. When they try to perform a duet from their childhood, the audience ridicules Jane's appearance and her poor singing voice, leading her to suffer a mental breakdown and be forced offstage. Korn drives to the mansion and finds Blanche, bound and gagged, near death. Jane stabs him to death with a broken trophy.

Jane puts Blanche in her car and drives to the beach, where their fondest memories took place during their childhood. Blanche admits she had been driving the car on the night of the accident but had allowed Jane to take the blame. She apologizes for never telling Jane the truth, and they are momentarily reconciled. The police arrive to find Blanche unconscious and near death. As they radio for help, Jane walks into the sea, attempting suicide before a police officer drags her out. The last shot is of Jane's smiling face as she goes with the police.

== Cast ==
- Vanessa Redgrave as Blanche Hudson
- Lynn Redgrave as Baby Jane Hudson
- Bruce A. Young as Dominick
- Amy Steel as Connie Trotter
- John Scott Clough as Frank Trotter
- John Glover as Billy Korn
- Vinny Argiro as Abe
- Pat Skipper as Director
- Barry Dennen as Stage Manager
- Samantha Jordan as Young Baby Jane Hudson
- J. Michael Flynn as Ray Hudson
- Erinn Canavan as Young Blanche Hudson
- Beans Morocco as Drag Queen
- Roy Fegan as Police Officer

== Differences from the novel ==
Being set during the 1990s as opposed to the 1960s in the original story, the film takes a modern overtone including Baby Jane being a film actress instead of a vaudevillian, and Blanche's use of the stairlift and cassette tape. Characters Elvira Stitt, the cleaning lady, and Edwin Flagg are replaced with Dominick, the physical therapist, and Billy Korn. The film also features scenes depicting the 1990s downtown district of Hollywood. Another change is Jane getting arrested at the end of the film.

== Critical reception ==
In a retrospective review, TV Guide awarded the film two stars, saying it "fares admirably when compared with the well-remembered original".
