= Baby Jane Hudson =

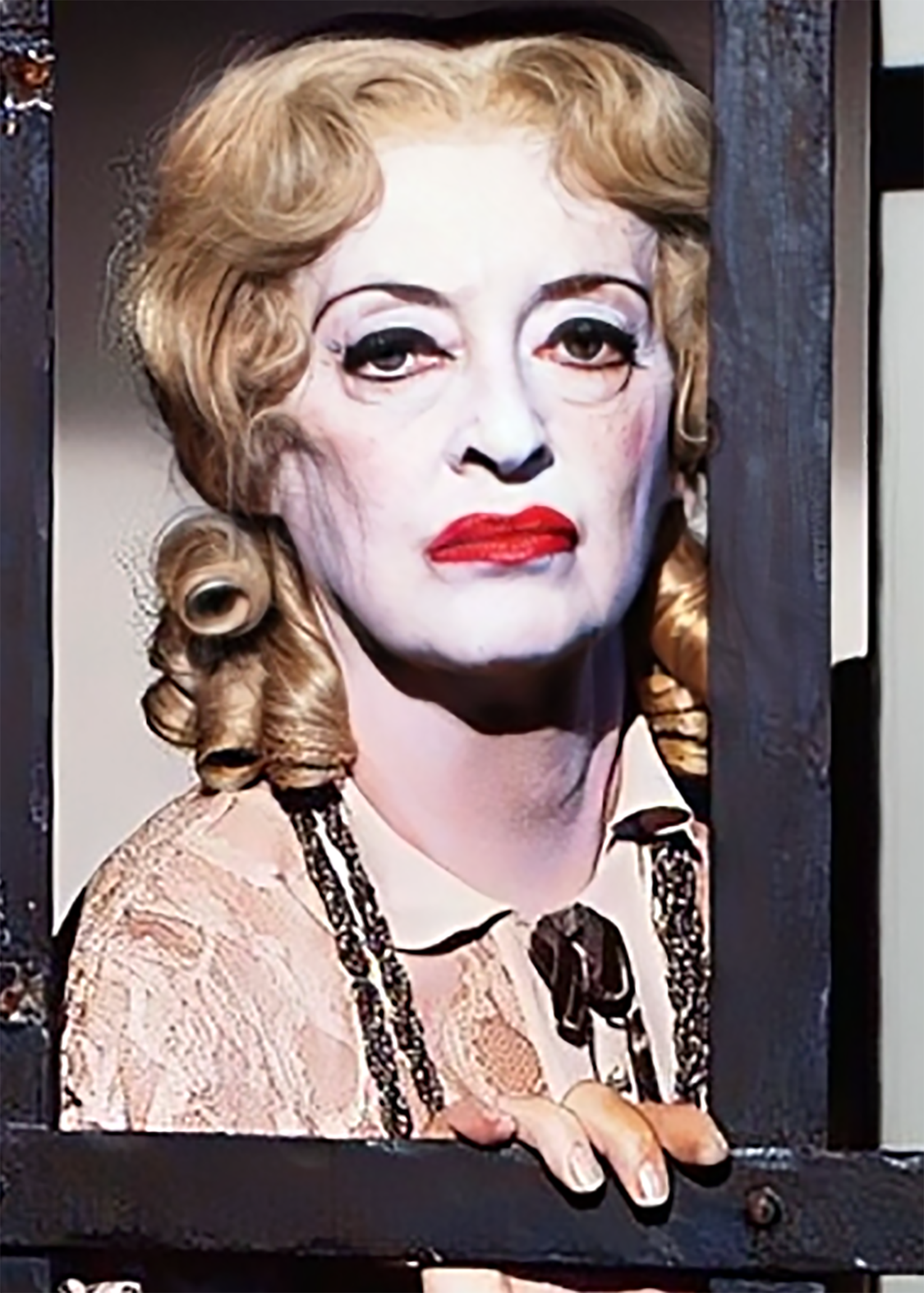
- Bette Davis as Baby Jane Hudson in the 1962 film adaptation
- First appearance: What Ever Happened to Baby Jane?
- Created by: Henry Farrell
- Portrayed by: Bette Davis (1962 film); Lynn Redgrave (1991 film); Susan Sarandon (Feud); Others: Julie Allred (1962 film, young); Samantha Jordan (1991 film, young)
- Voiced by: Debbie Burton (1962 film; young singing voice)

In-universe information
- Gender: Female
- Occupation: Former actress
- Family: Ray Hudson (father); Cora Hudson (mother); Blanche Hudson (sister)

Baby Jane Hudson is a fictional character and the main antagonist of Henry Farrell's 1960 novel What Ever Happened to Baby Jane? She was portrayed by Bette Davis in the 1962 film adaptation and by Lynn Redgrave in the 1991 television remake. The 1962 production is the better-known, and Bette Davis received an Academy Award nomination for her performance. The character is portrayed by Susan Sarandon, who plays Bette Davis, in the TV anthology Feud: Bette and Joan.

== Development ==
=== Origin ===
Early inspiration for the character of Baby Jane came from Jane Winslow, the daughter of a friend of Farrell's wife. Winslow stated that she would "run screaming from the room" whenever Farrell was visiting. Farrell also took inspiration from child actors such as Baby Peggy and Baby Rose Marie. He wanted the character to have "talent to burn" but lack the glamour that her sister Blanche would have in abundance.

=== Appearance ===
In Farrell's novel, the young Jane was described as an extremely talented child actress with an angelic appearance and a strong temper. As an adult, Jane's face is described as possessing sagging flesh that "threatened, greedily, to swallow up the once pert and childlike features embedded within its folds." Her hair is dyed cherry-red and styled into ringlets with a large satin bow. At home Jane is shown to wear red patent leather sandals, bobby socks, and soiled dresses made of either satin or cotton. When dressed for public, Jane utilizes heavy makeup.

For the 1962 film, Bette Davis designed her own look, as she assumed that "What I had in mind no professional makeup man would have dared to put on me". Davis assumed that Jane would look similar to "many women one sees on Hollywood Boulevard" and that the character would choose to apply a new layer of makeup every day as opposed to washing her face. Farrell approved of the design while on a set visit, as he saw Davis as capturing his vision for the character. For the costume, Davis used a blonde Mary Pickford wig that was reportedly used previously by Joan Crawford in Our Blushing Brides. Lynn Redgrave used a similar makeup design in the 1991 film, which she combined with red hair tied in pigtails and an adult-sized child's party dress.

== Character biography ==
In her youth, Baby Jane Hudson was a highly successful child star in vaudeville. Her parents heavily favor her over their younger daughter, Blanche. Their statuses change as vaudeville becomes less popular and film becomes the preferred form of entertainment. Blanche becomes a successful star while attempts by Jane to do the same is met with critical and commercial failure, due in part to Jane's temper and alcoholism. Her main roles are largely as an extra in Blanche's films, a condition that Blanche inserted into her contracts. Blanche's career is ended after she is paralyzed from the waist down in a car accident that is unofficially blamed on Jane. The two sisters move in together and Jane serves as Blanche's caretaker and cook, roles that allow her to largely alienate Blanche from the outside world.

As time passes Jane becomes increasingly more resentful and her mental health deteriorates. She dresses in clothing and hair styles that are reminiscent of her vaudeville wardrobe. Her fragile mental state breaks when Jane learns that her sister plans on selling the house and committing her to a mental asylum. Jane escalates her mistreatment of Blanche and tries in vain to revive her stage career by hiring an accompanist, Edwin. Her actions are discovered by the sisters' cleaning woman Elvira, causing Jane to murder the woman. When this is discovered by Edwin, Jane takes Blanche and flees to the seashore, the location of the sisters' few happy childhood memories.

At the beach Blanche confesses that Jane did not cause her paraplegic state; Blanche had caused it when she tried to run down Jane with her car. She blamed Jane for the accident so she could force Jane to become her caretaker. This destroys what is left of Jane's sanity and she dances on the beach as Blanche dies. The two are eventually discovered by the police.

== Characterization and critical interpretation ==
Baby Jane Hudson is an older woman who in the 1962 film adaptation is shown to be in her fifties. (Note: The novel has Jane as a child star in 1908 and the bulk of the novel takes place in 1959, a gap of approximately 51 years. In the Davis film adaptation, Jane is 9-years-old in 1917, placing her in her early to mid-fifties during the film's 1960s time period.) In her youth she was a spoiled child vaudeville star and as an adult, is a failed film star. She is resentful of her younger sister Blanche's former film success and because she had to become her sister's primary caretaker after a car accident left her paralyzed from the waist down. Jane was made to believe that the accident was her fault and she assumed the role out of guilt. The position leaves Jane with little time to socialize or make friends outside of the home, increasing her resentment.

Jane is described as a heavy drinker of alcohol, something that has caused multiple issues during her adult life. She is abusive towards her sister Blanche, particularly after she learns that Blanche plans on selling their home and placing her in a mental institution.

=== Critical interpretations ===
Peter Shelley has noted that Jane is initially depicted as the sole antagonist of the 1962 film What Ever Happened to Baby Jane?, however the reveal that Blanche's partial paralysis is a result of her seeking revenge on Jane years earlier makes the viewer re-evaluate Blanche as an additional antagonist and "turns Davis into a passive child, victimized and insane" as the revelation removes the guilt Jane felt towards her sister. The character has also been the subject of works focusing on the depiction and "otherness" of the elderly and aging in cinema. Sally Chivers opined that Jane is incapable of understanding herself as an adult, is a "twisted form of what critical theorist Mary Russo has called a 'scandal of anachronism'", and also sees her as an example of "the impossible standards placed on all non-normative bodies (that is, all bodies) by mid-twentieth-century Hollywood cinema." The character has also been cited by people such as Niall Richardson as an example of "age drag", where women will attempt to disguise or eradicate signs of aging.

== Performers ==
The character of Baby Jane Hudson has been depicted in multiple forms of media outside of the original book. Depictions of the character include

- Bette Davis portrayed the character in the 1962 film adaptation.
- Lynn Redgrave starred as Baby Jane in the 1991 television remake.
- Matthew Marin portrayed Baby Jane in the 2010 film Baby Jane?, which was a parody and homage to the 1962 film.
- Millicent Martin originated the character in the 2002 Theater Under the Stars musical adaptation of the novel.
- Susan Sarandon portrayed Bette Davis in the 2017 TV anthology Feud: Bette and Joan, during which there are scenes of Sarandon-as-Davis portraying Baby Jane.

== Legacy ==
For her role, Bette Davis was nominated for an Academy Award for Best Actress. Davis's portrayal of the character was named the 44th greatest villain in film history (and 15th greatest villainess, behind Davis's role as Regina Giddens in The Little Foxes) by the American Film Institute in their series 100 Years...100 Heroes & Villains.

The character of Baby Jane Hudson, as well as her sister Blanche, have become iconic in the LGBTQ+ community and the character has been influential with the drag community. Shortly after the release of the 1962 film, Ray Harrison and the Gay Girls Riding Club created a 30-minute short film spoofing the character and movie, entitled What Really Happened to Baby Jane.
