= The John Glenn Story =

1962 film

- Directed by: Michael R. Lawrence
- Produced by: William L. Hendricks; Julian Krainin
- Cinematography: Julian Krainin
- Edited by: John Caps; Michael R. Lawrence
- Production companies: NASA, United States Department of Health, Education and Welfare, United States Department of Justice, United States Department of the Navy
- Distributed by: Warner Bros.
- Release date: 1962
- Running time: 30 minutes
- Country: United States
- Language: English

The John Glenn Story is a 1962 American short documentary film directed by Michael R. Lawrence about the astronaut John Glenn. It was nominated for an Academy Award for Best Documentary Short.
