= What Ever Happened to Baby Jane? (novel) =

Book by Henry Farrell

- Author: Henry Farrell
- Language: English
- Subject: Gothic fiction
- Genre: Horror, thriller
- Publisher: Rinehart & Company
- Publication date: March 3, 1960
- Publication place: United States
- Media type: Hardcover, paperback
- Pages: 304
- ISBN: 978-1444780420

What Ever Happened to Baby Jane? is an American psychological horror novel by Henry Farrell published in 1960 by Rinehart & Company. The novel has earned a cult following, and has been adapted for the screen twice, in 1962 and 1991.

Some say the novel was based on the Janes sisters who were born in Aurora, IL. The family moved from Aurora to Hollywood about 1902 and opened a school in a house they built in 1903. It was one of a parcel of model Victorian homes developed by H. J. Whitley on what was then Prospect Avenue (renamed Hollywood Boulevard in 1910).The school was for the children of silent film stars such as Charlie Chaplin, Jesse Lasky, Douglas Fairbanks Sr., Thomas Ince, and Wallace Beery. It was called The Misses Janes School of Hollywood.

== Plot ==
This Gothic story deals with two sisters, Jane and Blanche Hudson, who are living alone together in a decaying Hollywood mansion. A former child star of early vaudeville known as "Baby Jane", Jane was doted upon by her father due to her success on the stage while Blanche lived in her shadow, neglected. However, their roles were reversed after the death of their parents; both children moved to Los Angeles to live with an aunt. Blanche was favored by directors for her blonde hair and regal beauty, and finally decided to pursue a successful film career. Blanche became a star, while a string of flops cost Jane her fame and popularity. Blanche managed to keep her sister's career alive by having a clause in her contract stipulating that Jane have a role in every film in which Blanche appeared, but these were always minor parts that relegated Jane to the same neglect Blanche had suffered.

The story then shifts to the present, where Jane, who still dresses as if she were 10 years old, and Blanche, disabled after a mysterious car accident, are now aging spinsters living in Blanche's crumbling estate. Jane resents how her career has been all but forgotten compared to Blanche's (who became more famous than she ever was, and who is now being remembered because of a revival of her films on television). Jane also hates having to cook, clean and care for her sister. Although stuck upstairs in her bedroom, Blanche has managed to keep her good looks while Jane's appearance is ravaged by years of alcoholism.

Blanche, whose only other contact with the outside world is Edna Stitt, the mansion's cleaning woman, and the telephone conversations she occasionally has with her doctor and attorney, realizes that Jane is becoming increasingly unstable. She calls her lawyer and tells him that she is planning to sell the house. Jane, who eavesdrops on her sister's calls, believes that Blanche intends to have her committed to a mental hospital. Blanche becomes aware of her sister's sinister mood swings and tries to explain her decision, but Jane simply ignores her. Soon, Jane begins to exhibit signs of insanity. She removes the phone from Blanche's room and makes her afraid to eat by serving her a dead bird from their yard, and later covering an elaborate three-course dinner with a layer of sand. In a drunken daze, Jane decides to resurrect her old Baby Jane stage act, reasoning that Fanny Brice had success with Baby Snooks. She hires Edwin Flagg, a socially awkward mama’s boy, and struggling musician, as an accompanist, through a help wanted ad. Although he is both highly skeptical of Jane’s career ambitions and instantly repulsed by her overall grotesqueness; Edwin senses an opportunity, and decides to humor her.

As reality topples crazily into eerie fantasy, Jane begins to abuse her sister with monstrous cruelty and embezzles her money to buy liquor and finance her comeback. Edna becomes uneasy when she is unable to reach Blanche on the phone and Jane refuses to let her clean her sister's room. Opening the door to find Blanche tied to the bed with her mouth taped shut, she tries to help, but Jane sneaks up and kills Edna with a hammer. That night, Jane dumps the body.

In the days after, Jane, racked by guilt and fear of inevitable discovery by the police, tries to repent. She stops drinking, starts wearing conservative house dresses, eschews makeup, wears her hair combed, and begins slowly nursing Blanche back to health.

Meanwhile, Edwin Flagg, eager for independence from his domineering mother, returns to the Hudson’s mansion to exploit Jane for his promised salary. Now aware of the Hudson sisters’ infamous history, and believing them to be wealthy, he attempts to further ingratiate himself with Jane as they share a bottle of whiskey. Blanche hears them talking, and manages to topple her food tray to create a disturbance. Edwin discovers the emaciated Blanche, and runs from the house in horror. A panicked Jane follows in her car and attempts to run him down. Thinking she has killed for a second time, Jane grabs her barely conscious sister, and heads for the location of some of her happier childhood memories: the beach where she and her father used to practice her song-and-dance routine while crowds of onlookers watched. Jane plays in the sand, and Blanche lies weak and on the verge of death from starvation and abuse.

Realizing that she may be dying, Blanche reveals to Jane that it was she, not Jane, who was responsible for paralyzing her. After Jane humiliated Blanche at a party years earlier, her sister tried to run her over before Jane got out of the way. The car then slammed into a metal gate, snapping Blanche's spine. She managed to crawl out of the car to the gates, and Jane, frightened and drunk, hid in a flophouse hotel where she passed out. When the police arrived, they assumed that Jane had been driving. Blanche later realized that the event had driven her sister insane with guilt, but refused to allow her to seek psychiatric help for fear that Jane might recover enough to remember what really happened and then would leave her. Realizing that all the years of hatred and resentment between the sisters could have been avoided, Jane forgives Blanche.

Jane calls the police and tells them that her sister is very sick. Outside the phone booth, three officers recognize her and gently take Jane back to the beach. They start to question her and ask her where her sister is. At first, Jane vaguely tells them where to find Blanche, leading them to the beach. She then becomes confused and ignores their questions. Upon mentioning the name "Miss Hudson", Jane is taken to her vaudeville days, and she begins to dance "very prettily" despite the police's imploring her to tell them where Blanche is. The novel ends with Jane's dancing but does not reveal if Blanche survives or not.

== 1962 film ==
What Ever Happened to Baby Jane? is a 1962 American psychological thriller-horror film film produced and directed by Robert Aldrich, starring Bette Davis and Joan Crawford, about an aging actress who holds her paraplegic sister captive in an old Hollywood mansion, with screenplay adapted by Lukas Heller. Upon the film's release, it was met with widespread critical and box-office acclaim, and was nominated for five Academy Awards, winning one for Best Costume Design, Black and White.

Reports of a bitter on-set rivalry between Davis and Crawford, the film's two stars, helped drive the film's initial success. This in part led to the revitalization of the then-waning careers of the two stars. In the years after release, critics continued to acclaim the film for its psychologically driven black comedy, camp, and creation of the psycho-biddy subgenre. The film's then-unheard of and controversial plot meant that it originally received an X rating in the UK.

== 1991 film ==
What Ever Happened to... is a 1991 American TV movie directed by David Greene and adapted for the small screen by Brian Taggert, based on the novel What Ever Happened to Baby Jane? and the 1962 theatrical film of the same name. It stars real-life sisters Lynn Redgrave as Baby Jane Hudson and Vanessa Redgrave as Blanche Hudson.

The film was adapted to contemporary times, with Blanche's film success taking place in the 1960s instead of the 1930s. Her films were being rediscovered on home video instead of television reruns. Jane had been a child film star (replacing the original's vaudeville success), but her films were unavailable, leading to her jealousy.
