= List of Bette Davis performances =

List of film appearances by actress Bette Davis

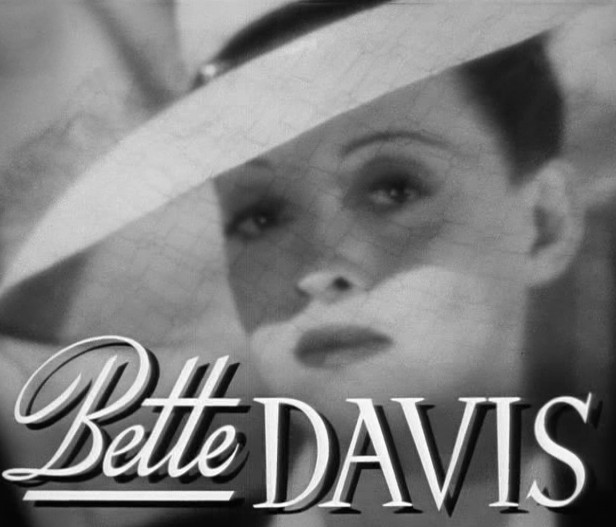
Davis in a shot from the trailer of Now, Voyager, one of ten films for which she received an Academy Award nomination for Best Actress.

This is a complete filmography of Bette Davis. She began acting in films in 1931, incipiently as a contract player with Universal Studios, where she made her film debut in Bad Sister. She was initially seen as unappealing by studio executives, and was assigned to a string of B-movies early in her career.

Davis made a transition to Warner Bros. in 1932, and made her breakthrough performance in The Man Who Played God, opposite George Arliss. She continued in a succession of films, but did not gain further recognition until she agreed to star in John Cromwell's adaptation of the W. Somerset Maugham's Of Human Bondage on a loan-out to RKO. The role of Mildred Rogers had been rejected by several actresses, but Davis achieved critical acclaim for her performance. Outrage was expressed by her omission at the Academy Awards to the point where there was a write-in vote, which is unofficially acknowledged. Dangerous (1935) became the first time she won an Academy Award for Best Actress, although many felt it was a consolation prize for not winning for Of Human Bondage.

In 1936, convinced her career would be ruined by appearing in mediocre films, Davis walked out on her Warner Brothers contract, and decided to make films in England. Davis explained her viewpoint to a journalist, saying: "I knew that, if I continued to appear in any more mediocre pictures, I would have no career left worth fighting for." She eventually settled her disagreements with Warner Brothers, and returned to the studio in 1937. During this time, she starred in the films The Petrified Forest (1936) and Marked Woman (1937), among others. In 1938, Warner Brothers cast her in Jezebel (1938). It was a critical and box office success, and earned her another Best Actress Academy Award alongside her Best Supporting Actress winning co-star, Fay Bainter.

Davis was at the peak of her career in the late 1930s and early-to-mid 1940s, at a time when she was one of the highest-paid actresses in Hollywood and turned down parts she found inferior. She began a record-setting five consecutive Oscar nominations with Jezebel, followed by her acclaimed performance in Dark Victory (1939); and earned further plaudits for her performances in The Old Maid (also 1939) and the remake of The Letter (1940, Oscar nomination). Davis also earned acclaim for her portrayal of Elizabeth I of England in The Private Lives of Elizabeth and Essex (1939), with Errol Flynn and Olivia de Havilland. Davis later appeared in the melodramas The Little Foxes (Oscar nom) and The Great Lie (both 1941); and in the comedy film The Man Who Came to Dinner (1942).

One of Davis' biggest successes at Warner Bros. was Now, Voyager (1942), which earned her another Academy Award nomination. For the first time in six consecutive years, Davis was overlooked for an Oscar nomination for her 1943 films Watch on the Rhine and Old Acquaintance. But the following year, she earned another nomination for Mr. Skeffington (1944), which was succeeded by The Corn Is Green (1945) and A Stolen Life (1946).

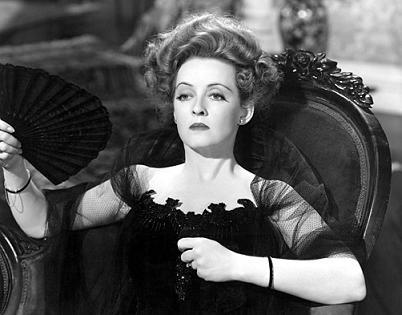
Davis in The Little Foxes

Davis's later films for Warner Bros., including Winter Meeting (1948) and Beyond the Forest (1949), failed at the box office. As her popularity waned, Warner Brothers dropped her contract in 1949, and from thereafter on, she occupied a freelance career.

Davis received a career revival in All About Eve (1950) for 20th Century-Fox. She played an aging Broadway star, Margo Channing, who is manipulated by an obsessed fan. The film was one of the biggest hits of 1950, and she was again nominated for an Academy Award, but lost to Judy Holliday. Although Davis earned strong reviews and another nomination for her performance in The Star (1952, nom), her career waned throughout the remainder of the decade. Other 1950s films include Another Man's Poison (1951); plus Storm Center and The Catered Affair (both 1956).

In the 1960s, Davis received yet another revival in popularity. Although her appearance in Pocketful of Miracles (1961) was negatively received, she earned praise for her portrayal of the faded child star, Jane Hudson, in What Ever Happened to Baby Jane? (1962), which garnered her a final nomination for an Academy Award. She retained a cult status throughout the remainder of her career, and appeared in several other thriller films, such as Hush...Hush, Sweet Charlotte and Dead Ringer (both 1964); as well as The Nanny (1965). She also starred in the film The Anniversary (1968).

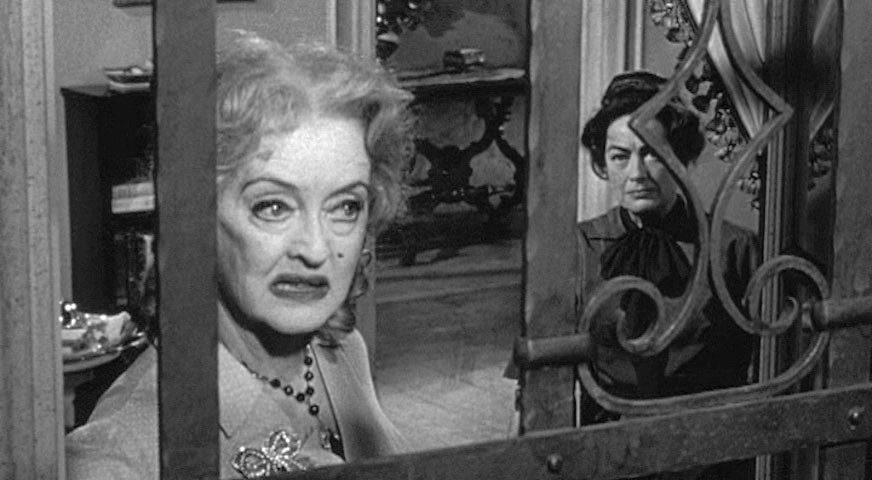
Davis and Joan Crawford (right) in What Ever Happened to Baby Jane?

The 1970s saw Davis veer more into television by the end of the decade, in addition to various film genres. She starred such films as Connecting Rooms (1970); Burnt Offerings (1976, which won her a Saturn Award); and Death on the Nile (1978); while on television, she starred in The Disappearance of Aimee (1977) and Strangers: The Story of a Mother and Daughter (1979), earning her second Emmy nomination for the latter.

By the 1980s, her film output had waned slightly, but not entirely, beginning the decade off with The Watcher in the Woods (1980). She concentrated more on television, starring in White Mama (1980); A Piano for Mrs. Cimino and Little Gloria... Happy at Last (both 1982); Right of Way (1983); and As Summers Die (1986). As for films, she was lauded for her performance in The Whales of August (1987), opposite Lillian Gish.

Davis starred in her final film Wicked Stepmother (1989), although she felt that the script was poor. The film had production problems, with Davis often quarreling with Larry Cohen, and she withdrew from the film shortly after production began. After 58 years of acting, she made her final appearance on an April 20 broadcast of Late Night with David Letterman.

== Film ==
=== 1930s ===
Year	Title	Role	Director	Studio	Notes
1931	Bad Sister	Laura Madison	Hobart Henley	Universal	film debut
1931	Seed	Margaret Carter	John M. Stahl	Universal	
1931	Waterloo Bridge	Janet Cronin	James Whale	Universal	
1931	Way Back Home	Mary Lucy	William A. Seiter	RKO	
1932	The Menace	Peggy Lowell	Roy William Neill	Columbia	
1932	Hell's House	Peggy Gardner	Howard Higgin	B.F. Zeidman Productions Ltd.	
1932	The Man Who Played God	Grace Blair	John G. Adolfi	Warner Bros.	
1932	So Big!	Miss Dallas O'Mara	William A. Wellman	Warner Bros.	
1932	The Rich Are Always with Us	Malbro	Alfred E. Green	First National	
1932	The Dark Horse	Kay Russell	Alfred E. Green	Warner Bros.	
1932	The Cabin in the Cotton	Madge Norwood	Michael Curtiz	First National	
1932	Three on a Match	Ruth Wescott	Mervyn LeRoy	Warner Bros.	
1932	20,000 Years in Sing Sing	Fay Wilson	Michael Curtiz	Warner Bros.	
1933	Parachute Jumper	Patricia "Alabama" Brent	Alfred E. Green	Warner Bros.	
1933	The Working Man	Jenny Harland	John G. Adolfi	Warner Bros.	aka Jane Grey
1933	Ex-Lady	Helen Bauer	Robert Florey	Warner Bros.	
1933	Bureau of Missing Persons	Norma Roberts	Roy Del Ruth	First National	
1934	The Big Shakedown	Norma Nelson	John Francis Dillon	First National	
1934	Fashions of 1934	Lynn Mason	William Dieterle	Warner Bros.	
1934	Jimmy the Gent	Miss Joan Martin	Michael Curtiz	Warner Bros.	
1934	Fog Over Frisco	Arlene Bradford	William Dieterle	Warner Bros.	
1934	Of Human Bondage	Mildred Rogers	John Cromwell	RKO	
1934	Housewife	Patricia "Pat" Berkeley	Alfred E. Green	Warner Bros.	
1935	Bordertown	Mrs. Marie Roark	Archie Mayo	Warner Bros.	
1935	The Girl from 10th Avenue	Miriam A. Brady	Alfred E. Green	Warner Bros.	
1935	Front Page Woman	Ellen Garfield	Michael Curtiz	Warner Bros.	
1935	Special Agent	Julie Gardner	William Keighley	Warner Bros.	
1935	Dangerous	Joyce Heath	Alfred E. Green	Warner Bros.	
1936	The Petrified Forest	Gabrielle "Gabby" Maple	Archie Mayo	Warner Bros.	
1936	The Golden Arrow	Daisy Appleby	Alfred E. Green	Warner Bros.	
1936	Satan Met a Lady	Valerie Purvis	William Dieterle	Warner Bros.	
1937	Marked Woman	Mary Dwight Strauber	Lloyd Bacon	Warner Bros.	
1937	Kid Galahad	Louise "Fluff" Phillips	Michael Curtiz	Warner Bros.	
1937	That Certain Woman	Mary Donnell	Edmund Goulding	Warner Bros.	aka Mrs. Al Haines
1937	It's Love I'm After	Joyce Arden	Archie Mayo	Warner Bros.	
1938	Jezebel	Julie Marsden	William Wyler	Warner Bros.	
1938	The Sisters	Louise Elliott Medlin	Anatole Litvak	Warner Bros.	
1939	Dark Victory	Judith Traherne	Edmund Goulding	Warner Bros.	
1939	Juarez	Empress Carlotta	William Dieterle	Warner Bros.	
1939	The Old Maid	Charlotte Lovell	Edmund Goulding	Warner Bros.	
1939	The Private Lives of Elizabeth and Essex	Queen Elizabeth I	Michael Curtiz	Warner Bros.	

=== 1940s ===
Year	Title	Role	Director	Studio	Notes
1940	All This, and Heaven Too	Henriette Deluzy-Desportes	Anatole Litvak	Warner Bros.	
1940	The Letter	Leslie Crosbie	William Wyler	Warner Bros.	
1941	The Great Lie	Maggie Patterson Van Allen	Edmund Goulding	Warner Bros.	
1941	Shining Victory	Nurse	Irving Rapper	Warner Bros.	uncredited cameo role
1941	The Bride Came C.O.D.	Joan Winfield	William Keighley	Warner Bros.	
1941	The Little Foxes	Regina Giddens	William Wyler	RKO	
1942	The Man Who Came to Dinner	Maggie Cutler	William Keighley	Warner Bros.	
1942	In This Our Life	Stanley Timberlake Kingsmill	John Huston	Warner Bros.	
1942	Now, Voyager	Charlotte Vale	Irving Rapper	Warner Bros.	
1943	Watch on the Rhine	Sara Muller	Herman Shumlin	Warner Bros.	
1943	Thank Your Lucky Stars	Herself	David Butler	Warner Bros.	cameo role
1943	Old Acquaintance	Kit Marlowe	Vincent Sherman	Warner Bros.	
1944	Mr. Skeffington	Fanny Trellis	Vincent Sherman	Warner Bros.	
1944	Hollywood Canteen	Herself	Delmer Daves	Warner Bros.	cameo role
1945	The Corn Is Green	Miss Lilly Moffat	Irving Rapper	Warner Bros.	
1946	A Stolen Life	Kate Bosworth / Patricia Bosworth	Curtis Bernhardt	Warner Bros.	dual role
1946	Deception	Christine Radcliffe	Irving Rapper	Warner Bros.	
1948	Winter Meeting	Susan Grieve	Bretaigne Windust	Warner Bros.	
1948	June Bride	Linda Gilman	Bretaigne Windust	Warner Bros.	
1949	Beyond the Forest	Rosa Moline	King Vidor	Warner Bros.	

=== 1950s ===
Year	Title	Role	Director	Studio	Notes
1950	All About Eve	Margo Channing	Joseph L. Mankiewicz	20th Century Fox	New York Film Critics Circle Award for Best Actress; Cannes Film Festival Award for Best Actress
1951	Payment on Demand	Joyce Ramsey	Curtis Bernhardt	RKO	Shot in 1949, except for final scene
1951	Another Man's Poison	Janet Frobisher	Irving Rapper	Angel Productions	
1952	Phone Call from a Stranger	Marie Hoke	Jean Negulesco	20th Century Fox	
1952	The Star	Margaret Elliot	Stuart Heisler	20th Century Fox	
1955	The Virgin Queen	Queen Elizabeth I	Henry Koster	20th Century Fox	
1956	The Catered Affair	Agnes Hurley	Richard Brooks	MGM	
1956	Storm Center	Alicia Hull	Daniel Taradash	Columbia	
1959	John Paul Jones	Catherine the Great	John Farrow	Warner Bros.	
1959	The Scapegoat	Countess De Gué	Robert Hamer	Metro-Goldwyn-Mayer	

=== 1960s ===
Year	Title	Role	Director	Studio	Notes
1961	Pocketful of Miracles	Apple Annie	Frank Capra	United Artists	
1962	What Ever Happened to Baby Jane?	Baby Jane Hudson	Robert Aldrich	Seven Arts	
1963	The Empty Canvas	Dino's mother	Damiano Damiani	Compagnia Cinematografica Champion	
1964	Dead Ringer	Margaret De Lorca / Edith Phillips	Paul Henreid	Warner Bros.	dual role
1964	Where Love Has Gone	Mrs. Gerald Hayden	Edward Dmytryk	Paramount	
1964	Hush...Hush, Sweet Charlotte	Charlotte Hollis	Robert Aldrich	20th Century Fox	
1965	The Nanny	The Nanny	Seth Holt	Seven Arts	
1968	The Anniversary	Mrs. Taggart	Roy Ward Baker	Seven Arts	

=== 1970s ===
Year	Title	Role	Director	Studio	Notes
1970	Connecting Rooms	Wanda Fleming	Franklin Gollings	Hemdale	
1971	Bunny O'Hare	Bunny O'Hare	Gerd Oswald	American International	
1972	Madame Sin	Madame Sin	David Greene	ITC Entertainment	
1972	The Scientific Cardplayer	The Millionairess	Luigi Comencini	Dino de Laurentiis Cinematografica	
1976	Burnt Offerings	Aunt Elizabeth	Dan Curtis	United Artists	
1978	Return from Witch Mountain	Letha Wedge	John Hough	Disney	
1978	Death on the Nile	Marie Van Schuyler	John Guillermin	Paramount	

=== 1980s ===
Year	Title	Role	Director	Studio	Notes
1980	The Watcher in the Woods	Mrs. Aylwood	John Hough	Disney	
1987	The Whales of August	Libby Strong	Lindsay Anderson	Alive Films	
1989	Wicked Stepmother	Miranda Pierpoint	Larry Cohen	Metro-Goldwyn-Mayer	final film role

=== Short films appearing as herself ===
Year	Title	Notes
1932	The 42nd Street Special	
1935	A Dream Comes True	
1936	Screen Snapshots Series 16, No. 1	
1936	Screen Snapshots Series 15, No. 10	
1937	A Day at Santa Anita	
1937	Screen Snapshots Series 16, No. 8	
1938	For Auld Lang Syne	
1938	Screen Snapshots Series 17, No. 9	
1938	Breakdowns of 1938	Outtakes from That Certain Woman and Jezebel
1941	Breakdowns of 1941	
1943	The Present with a Future	Herself / Mother
1943	Show Business at War	
1984	Terror in the Aisles	Archival footage

=== Box Office Ranking ===
- 1939 - 6th (US)
- 1940 - 9th (US), 15th (UK)
- 1941 - 8th (US), 12th (UK)
- 1942 - 15th (US), 7th (UK)
- 1943 - 13th (US), 8th (UK)
- 1944 - 10th (US), 5th (UK)
- 1945 - 14th (US), 2nd (UK)
- 1946 - 15th (US), 5th (UK)
- 1947 - 5th (UK)
- 1951 - 7th (UK)

== Lux Radio Theatre appearances ==
Date	Title	Other cast members
March 30, 1936	Bought and Paid For	
May 17, 1937	Another Language	Fred MacMurray, John Beal
February 28, 1938	Forsaking All Others	Joel McCrea, Anderson Lawler
January 8, 1940	Dark Victory	Spencer Tracy, Humphrey Bogart
April 21, 1941	The Letter	Herbert Marshall, James Stephenson
December 15, 1941	All This, and Heaven Too	Charles Boyer, Bea Benaderet
March 6, 1944	The Letter	Herbert Marshall, Vincent Price
October 1, 1945	Mr. Skeffington	Claude Rains
February 11, 1946	Now, Voyager	Gregory Peck, Paul Henreid, Claude Rains
August 25, 1947	A Stolen Life	Glenn Ford
August 29, 1949	June Bride	James Stewart
September 3, 1951	Payment on Demand	Barry Sullivan
October 1, 1951	All About Eve	Gary Merrill

– Command Performance - 1942 - Clark Gable, Bette Davis, Count Basie

== Stage ==
Opening	Closing	Performances	Production	Role	Director
Mar. 5, 1929	Mar. 1929	27	The Earth Between	Floy Jennings	James Light
Nov. 5, 1929	Apr. 1930	178	Broken Dishes	Elaine Bumpstead	Marion Gering
Oct. 14, 1930	Nov. 1930	31	Solid South	Bam	Rouben Mamoulian
Dec. 15, 1952	N/A	90	Two's Company	Various	Jules Dassin
Sep. 14, 1960	Oct. 8, 1960	29	The World of Carl Sandburg	Herself	Norman Corwin
Dec. 28, 1961	Sep. 29, 1962 (Davis: Mar. 31, 1962)	316	The Night of the Iguana	Maxine Faulk	Frank Corsaro
Oct. 7, 1974	Oct. 18, 1974	8	Miss Moffatt (based upon The Corn Is Green)	Lily Cristobel Moffatt	Joshua Logan

== Television ==
=== 1950s ===
Year	Title	Role	Director
1952	What's My Line? Episode broadcast October 5	Herself (Mystery guest)	Franklin Heller
1955	The 27th Annual Academy Awards	Herself (Presenter: Best Actor)	Bill Bennington, Grey Lockwood
1956	The 20th Century Fox Hour; Episode : Crack Up	Marie Hoke	Ted Post
1956	Person to Person	Herself	Franklin J. Schaffner
1957	General Electric Theater; Episode: With Malice Toward One	Miss Burrows	Jules Bricken
1957	Schlitz Playhouse of Stars; Episode: For Better, For Worse	Irene Van Buren	John Brahm
1957	The Ford Television Theatre; Episode: Footnote on a Doll	Dolley Madison	Marc Daniels, Franklin J. Schaffner
1957	Telephone Time; Episode: Stranded	Beatrice Enter	Allen H. Miner
1958	Studio 57; Episode: The Starmaker	Paula	Allen H. Miner
1958	General Electric Theater; Episode:The Cold Touch	Christine Marlowe	Don Weis
1958	Suspicion; Episode: Fraction of a Second	Mrs Ellis	John Brahm
1958	The 30th Annual Academy Awards	Herself (Presenter: Honorary Awards)	Alan Handley
1958	The Dinah Shore Chevy Show	Herself	William Asher
1959	Alfred Hitchcock Presents; Season 4 Episode 16: "Out There - Darkness"	Miss Fox	Paul Henreid
1959	The DuPont Show with June Allyson; Episode: Dark Morning	Sarah Whitney	Don Medford
1959	Wagon Train; Episode: The Elizabeth McQueeney Story	Elizabeth McQueeney	Allen H. Miner
1959	Wagon Train; Episode: The Ella Lindstrom Story	Ella Lindstrom	Allen H. Miner
1959	The 31st Annual Academy Awards	Herself (Presenter: Best Supporting Actor)	Alan Handley

=== 1960s ===
Year	Title	Role	Director
1960	What's My Line? Episode broadcast August 28	Herself (Mystery guest)	
1961	Wagon Train; Episode: The Bettina May Story	Bettina May	Richard Donner
1962	The Virginian; Episode: The Accomplice	Celia Miller	Maurice Geraghty
1962	Here's Hollywood; Episode broadcast October 9	Herself	
1962	What's My Line? Episode broadcast November 11	Herself	
1962	Here's Hollywood; Episode broadcast December 1	Herself	
1962	Tonight Starring Jack Paar; Episode broadcast November 16	Herself	
1962	The Andy Williams Show; Episode broadcast December 20	Herself	
1963	Perry Mason; Episode: The Case of Constant Doyle	Constant Doyle	Allen H. Miner
1963	The 35th Annual Academy Awards	Nominee: Best Actress; Herself (Presenter: Writing Awards)	
1963	Reflets de Cannes; Episode broadcast May 16	Herself	
1964	The Hollywood Palace; Episode #2.7	Herself	
1964	What's My Line? Episode broadcast March 29	Herself	
1965	The Hollywood Palace; Episode #2.21	Herself	
1965	What's My Line? Episode broadcast October 24	Herself	
1965	Bette Davis - Star und Rebellin	Herself	
1965	I've Got a Secret; Episode broadcast March 1	Herself	
1965	The Decorator (unsold pilot)	Liz	Richard Kinon
1966	Gunsmoke; Episode: The Jailer	Etta Stone	Vincent McEveety
1966	The Hollywood Palace; Episode #3.19	Herself	
1967	The Smothers Brothers Comedy Hour; Episode #1.4	Herself	
1967	The Smothers Brothers Comedy Hour; Episode #1.20	Herself	
1967	The Smothers Brothers Comedy Hour; Episode #2.2	Herself	
1967	Think Twentieth	Herself	

=== 1970s ===
Year	Title	Role	Director
1970	The Dick Cavett Show; Episode broadcast November 26	Herself	
1970	It Takes a Thief; Episode: Touch of Magic	Bessie Grindel	Gerd Oswald
1971	The Dick Cavett Show; Episode broadcast November 17	Herself	
1971	This Is Your Life	Herself (Honoree)	
1972	The Judge and Jake Wyler (TV movie)	Judge Meredith	David Lowell Rich
1972	Madame Sin (TV movie)	Madame Sin	David Greene
1972	The Tonight Show Starring Johnny Carson; Episode broadcast February 14, 1972	Herself	
1972	Johnny Carson Presents the Sun City Scandals '72	Herself	
1973	Scream, Pretty Peggy (TV movie)	Mrs Elliott	Gordon Hessler
1973	The Dean Martin Celebrity Roast; Roast: Johnny Carson	Herself	
1973	The Dean Martin Celebrity Roast; Roast: Bette Davis	Herself	
1973	ABC's Wide World of Entertainment	Hostess of "Warner Bros. Movies: A 50 Year Salute"	
1974	Hello Mother, Goodbye! (unsold pilot)	Teresa Mullen	Peter H. Hunt
1974	The 28th Annual Tony Awards	Herself (Presenter: Best Actor in a Play)	
1975	Parkinson; Episode #5.8	Herself	
1976	The Mike Douglas Show; Episode broadcast March 19	Herself	
1976	V.I.P.-Schaukel; Episode #6.1	Herself	
1976	The Disappearance of Aimee (TV movie)	Minnie Kennedy	Anthony Harvey
1977	Dinah! Episode broadcast July 20	Herself	
1977	The American Film Institute Salute to Bette Davis	Herself (Honoree)	
1977	Jimmy Carter's Inaugural Gala	Herself	
1977	Laugh-In; Episode #1.1	Herself	
1978	The 50th Annual Academy Awards	Herself (Presenter: Jean Hersholt Humanitarian Award)	
1978	The American Film Institute Salute to Henry Fonda	Herself	
1978	The Dark Secret of Harvest Home (TV miniseries)	Widow Fortune	Leo Penn
1979	Strangers: The Story of a Mother and Daughter (TV movie)	Lucy Mason	Milton Katselas

=== 1980s ===
Year	Title	Role	Director
1980	60 Minutes (Interviewed by Mike Wallace); Episode broadcast January 20	Herself	
1980	White Mama (TV movie)	Adele Malone	Jackie Cooper
1980	Skyward (TV movie)	Billie Dupree	Ron Howard
1980	Bob Hope's Overseas Christmas Tours: Around the World with the Troops - 1941-1972	Herself	
1981	Good Morning America (Interviewed by David Hartman); Episode broadcast April 7	Herself	
1981	Family Reunion (TV movie)	Elizabeth Winfield	Fielder Cook
1982	A Piano for Mrs. Cimino (TV movie)	Esther MacDonald Cimino	George Schaefer
1982	Little Gloria... Happy at Last (TV miniseries)	Alice Gwynne Vanderbilt	Waris Hussein
1982	All-Star Party for Carol Burnett	Herself	
1982	The American Film Institute Salute to Frank Capra	Herself	
1982	Night of 100 Stars	Herself	
1983	The Tonight Show Starring Johnny Carson; Episode broadcast February 9	Herself	
1983	Bette Davis: A Basically Benevolent Volcano	Herself	
1983	People Now (Interviewed by Bill Tush)	Herself	
1983	Hotel; Episode: “Hotel” (pilot)	Laura Trent	Jerry London
1983	Right of Way (TV movie)	Minnie Dwyer	George Schaefer
1985	Good Morning America (Interviewed by David Hartman); Episode broadcast February 19	Herself	
1985	Murder with Mirrors (TV movie)	Carrie Louise Serracold	Dick Lowry
1985	Étoiles et toiles Episode broadcast March 25	Herself	
1986	As Summers Die (TV movie)	Hannah Loftin	Jean-Claude Tramont
1986	The Tonight Show Starring Johnny Carson; Episode broadcast May 22	Herself	
1986	Directed by William Wyler	Herself	
1986	The 43rd Annual Golden Globe Awards	Herself (Presenter: Best Picture)	
1986	La Nuit des Césars	Herself (César Honoree)	
1987	Kennedy Center Honors: A Celebration of the Performing Arts	Herself (Honoree)	
1987	Today (Interviewed by Bryant Gumbel); Episode broadcast March 19	Herself	
1987	The 59th Annual Academy Awards	Herself (Presenter: Best Actor)	
1987	The Late Show Starring Joan Rivers; Episode broadcast April 7	Herself	
1987	Late Night with David Letterman; Episode broadcast May 26	Herself	
1987	The Phil Donahue Show; Episode broadcast June 16	Herself	
1987	Wogan; Episode broadcast September 14	Herself	
1987	Good Day! (Interviewed by Eileen Prose)	Herself	
1988	The Tonight Show Starring Johnny Carson; Episode broadcast January 7	Herself	
1988	De película Episode broadcast February 22	Herself	
1988	Larry King Live; Episode broadcast February 24	Herself	
1988	The 50th Barbara Walters Special; Episode broadcast November 29	Herself	
1989	Late Night with David Letterman; Episode broadcast April 20	Herself	

== Special appearances ==
Date	Event	Venue	Location
May 9–23, 1963	1963 Cannes Film Festival	N/A	Cannes, France
Nov. 1, 1969	San Francisco International Film Festival	SF Masonic Auditorium	San Francisco, Calif., United States
June 23, 1977	Miss Bette Davis Sings! record signing	Don Oven's Celebrity Record Shop	West Hollywood, Los Angeles, Calif., United States
Feb. 12, 1983	Miss Bette Davis Sings! record signing	Tower Records	West Hollywood, Los Angeles, Calif., United States
Feb. 15, 1988	This ’n That book signing	B. Dalton Bookseller	West Hollywood, Los Angeles, Calif., United States
Sep. 15–23, 1989	San Sebastián International Film Festival	N/A	Donostia-San Sebastián, Spain

== See also ==
- List of awards and nominations received by Bette Davis

== Bibliography ==
- Vermilye, Jerry (1973). Bette Davis. New York, Pyramid Publications. ISBN 978-0-515-02932-1.
- Ringgold, Gene (1966). The Films of Bette Davis. Cadillac Publishing Co. ISBN 0-8065-0953-8.
- List of Bette Davis performances at IMDb
- List of Bette Davis performances at the TCM Movie Database (archived)
- Bette Davis Broadway stage credits at the Internet Broadway Database
- Bette Davis official website
- Jerry Haendiges Vintage Radio Logs: Lux Radio Theater
