= List of awards and nominations received by Bette Davis =

Bette Davis awards and nominations
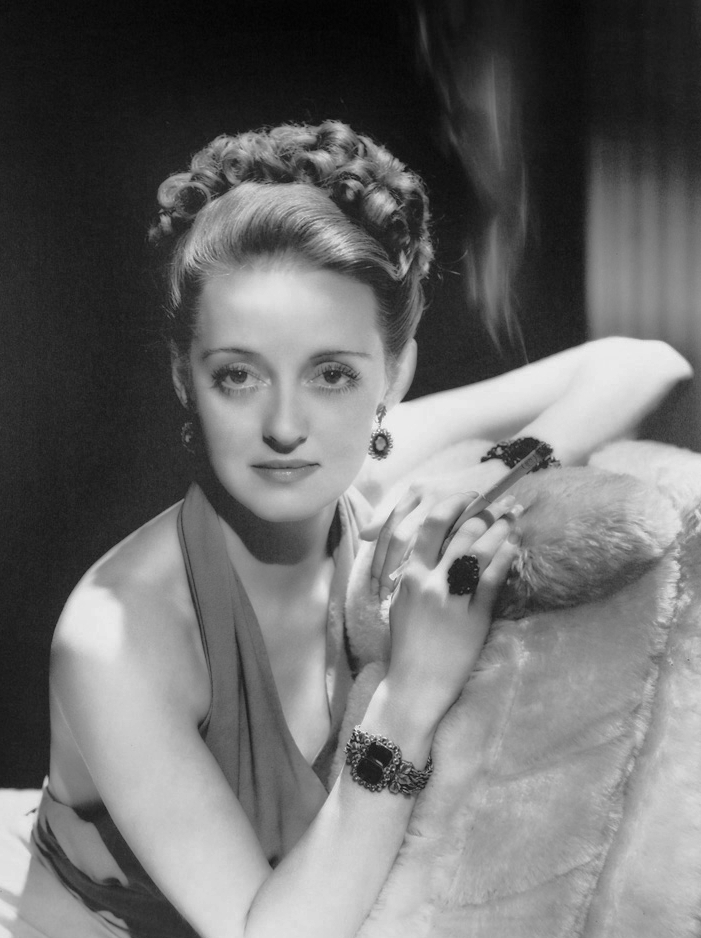
- Davis in 1938
Awards and nominations
Award	Wins	Nominations
Academy Awards	2	11
BAFTA Awards	0	1
Golden Globe Awards	0	3
Primetime Emmy Awards	1	4

Totals (Note: Certain award groups do not simply award one winner. They acknowledge several different recipients, have runners-up, and have third place. Since this is a specific recognition and is different from losing an award, runner-up mentions are considered wins in this award tally. For simplification and to avoid errors, each award in this list has been presumed to have had a prior nomination.)
- Wins: 34
- Nominations: 62

This is a list of Bette Davis's accolades for both her cinematic and television performances. Her career spans over six decades, from the beginning of the 1930s until the end of the 1980s, shortly before her death.

Her first acting "award" was being cited, alongside Joan Blondell and Ginger Rogers, as one of the "Stars of Tomorrow" in 1932. But it was two years later, when she had her breakthrough performance as Mildred Rogers in Of Human Bondage (1934), when she received her first major awards notice, or lack thereof. When the Academy Award nominations were announced and Davis's name was omitted, there was an uproar. The Academy was inundated with write-in votes demanding that she be nominated. Due to that popular demand, they permitted Davis's name to remain a write-in candidate, even though she was not an official nominee. She finished third in the votes. (They allowed this relaxed rule for the following year as well, wherein Paul Muni was a write-in nominee for Black Fury (1935). Despite being unofficial, he finished second in the votes. The academy discontinued this option as of 1936.)

When Muni receive his write-in, Davis received her first Oscar for Best Actress, for the film Dangerous (1935). Three years later, she would win again for Jezebel (1938). Beginning with this film, she next set a record for the most consecutive nominations, receiving five in a row from 1938 through 1942. These succeeding four films were Dark Victory (1939), The Letter (1940), The Little Foxes (1941), and Now, Voyager (1942). Her longstanding record would shortly be tied by Greer Garson, whose span went from 1941 to 1945 (with a win for 1942's Mrs. Miniver). She and Davis had two overlapping years, plus a third year where they were simultaneously nominated when Davis received her next nomination for Mr. Skeffington (1944).

Aside from Academy Awards, Davis also acquired a Volpi Cup for Best Actress in 1937 for both Marked Woman and Kid Galahad—the only recipient in their history to receive the prize for two performances. In addition to that, she received two Best Actress wins from the National Board of Review: one shared prize for both The Old Maid (1939) & Dark Victory; and another two years later, for The Little Foxes.

At this time, Davis had more acting Oscar nominations than anyone else. This streak continued with All About Eve (1950). She also received several other nominations and wins for this performance, including: Cannes Film Festival Award for Best Actress, New York Film Critics Circle Award for Best Actress, and her first Golden Globe nomination. Her next Oscar nomination was for The Star (1952).

One decade later, Davis continued receiving recognition for a variety of roles. She earned a Golden Globe Award for Best Actress – Motion Picture Comedy or Musical nomination for Pocketful of Miracles (1961), with adjacent nominations the following year for What Ever Happened to Baby Jane? (1962) from a Golden Globe Award for Best Actress in a Motion Picture – Drama, to a BAFTA for Best Foreign Actress, and finally, an Academy Award for Best Actress—her 10th official of the latter (or 11th, counting the write-in nomination). She thus became the first actress to reach double digits in her nominations tally.

Davis continued receiving several other awards and nominations, including 3rd Place from the Laurel Awards for ...Baby Jane? followed by a win for her performance in Hush...Hush, Sweet Charlotte (1964).

In her later years, she set her sights more often on television. She received four Primetime Emmy nominations, for an episode of ABC's Wide World of Entertainment retroactive special; plus Little Gloria...Happy at Last (1983); White Mama (1980); and Strangers: The Story of a Mother and Daughter (1979), for which she won an Emmy opposite Gena Rowlands.

She was also bestowed an honorary Cecil B. DeMille Award at the Golden Globes ceremony in 1974; an AFI Life Achievement Award in 1977; and a Kennedy Center Honors in 1987. These are just a few of the vast assortment of honorary awards she has received in addition to the aforementioned major accolades above.

== Major awards ==
The years listed in the columns are the corresponding years that the ceremonies occurred in which the awards were presented to the recipients. These are seldom the same years of the films' release dates.

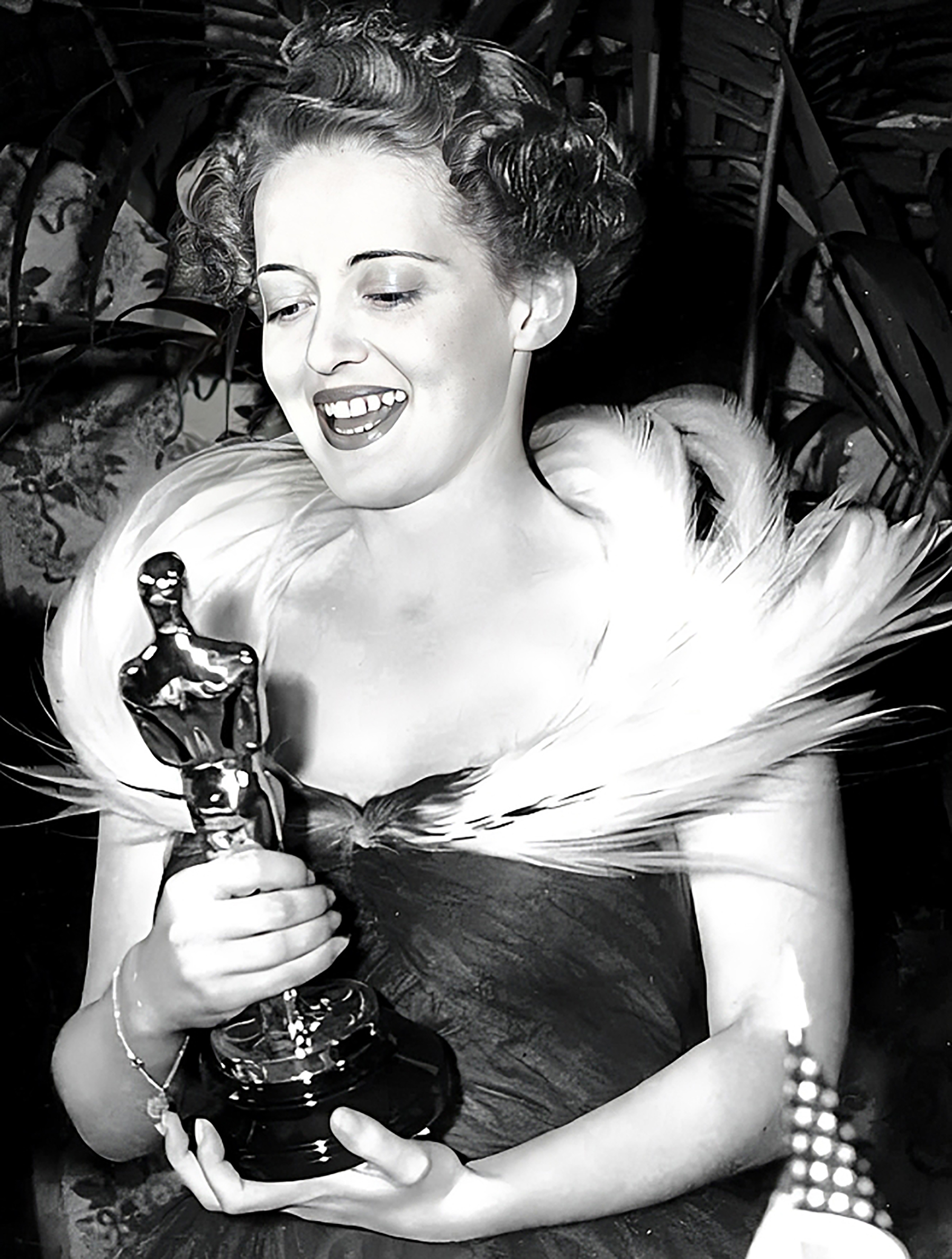
Davis with her Academy Award for Best Actress for Jezebel (1938) at the 11th Academy Awards in 1939.

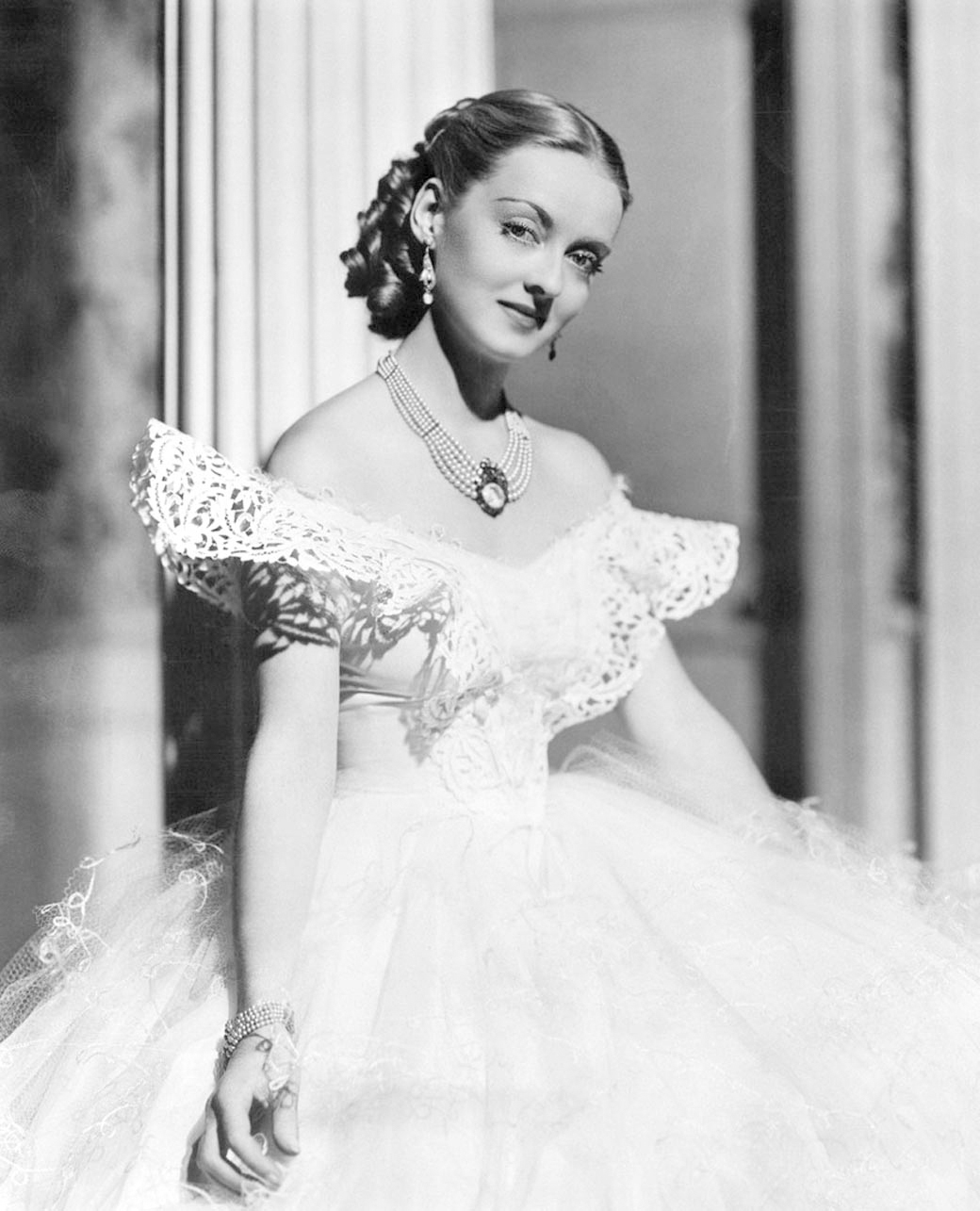
Davis in Jezebel (1938), for which she won the Academy Award for Best Actress.

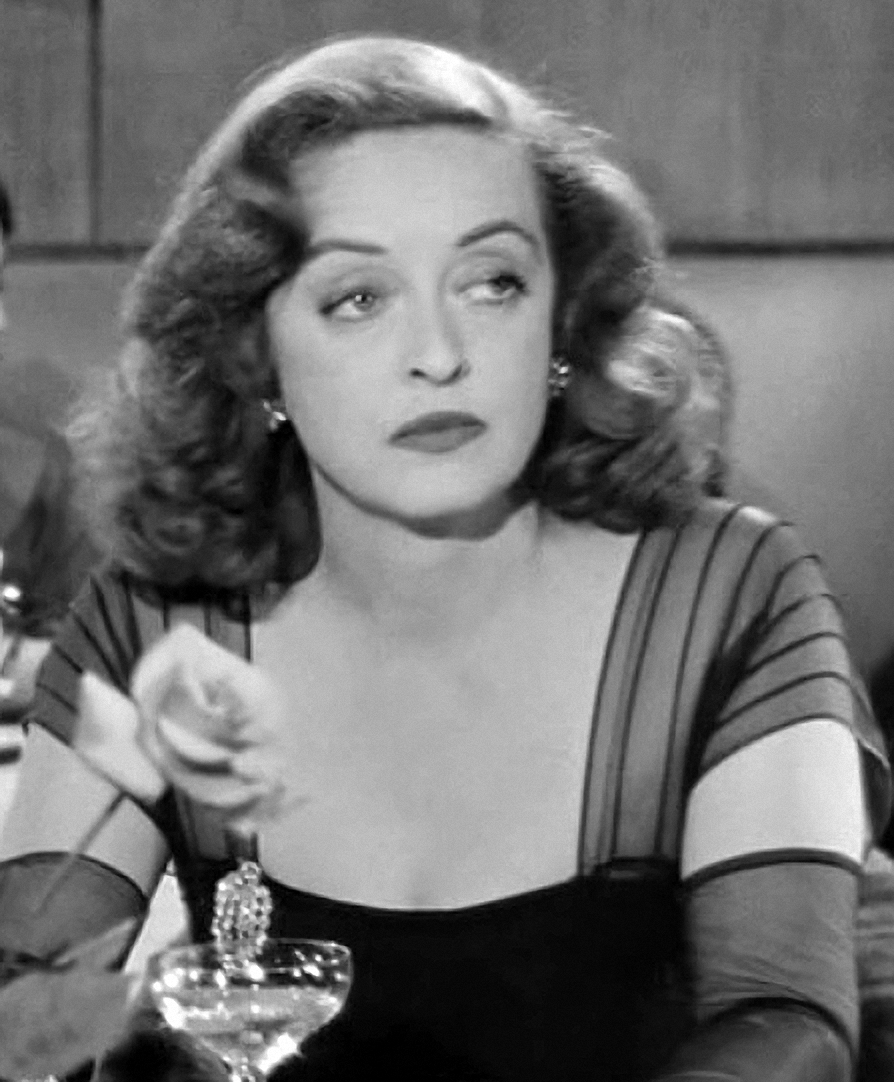
Davis as Margo Channing in All About Eve (1950).

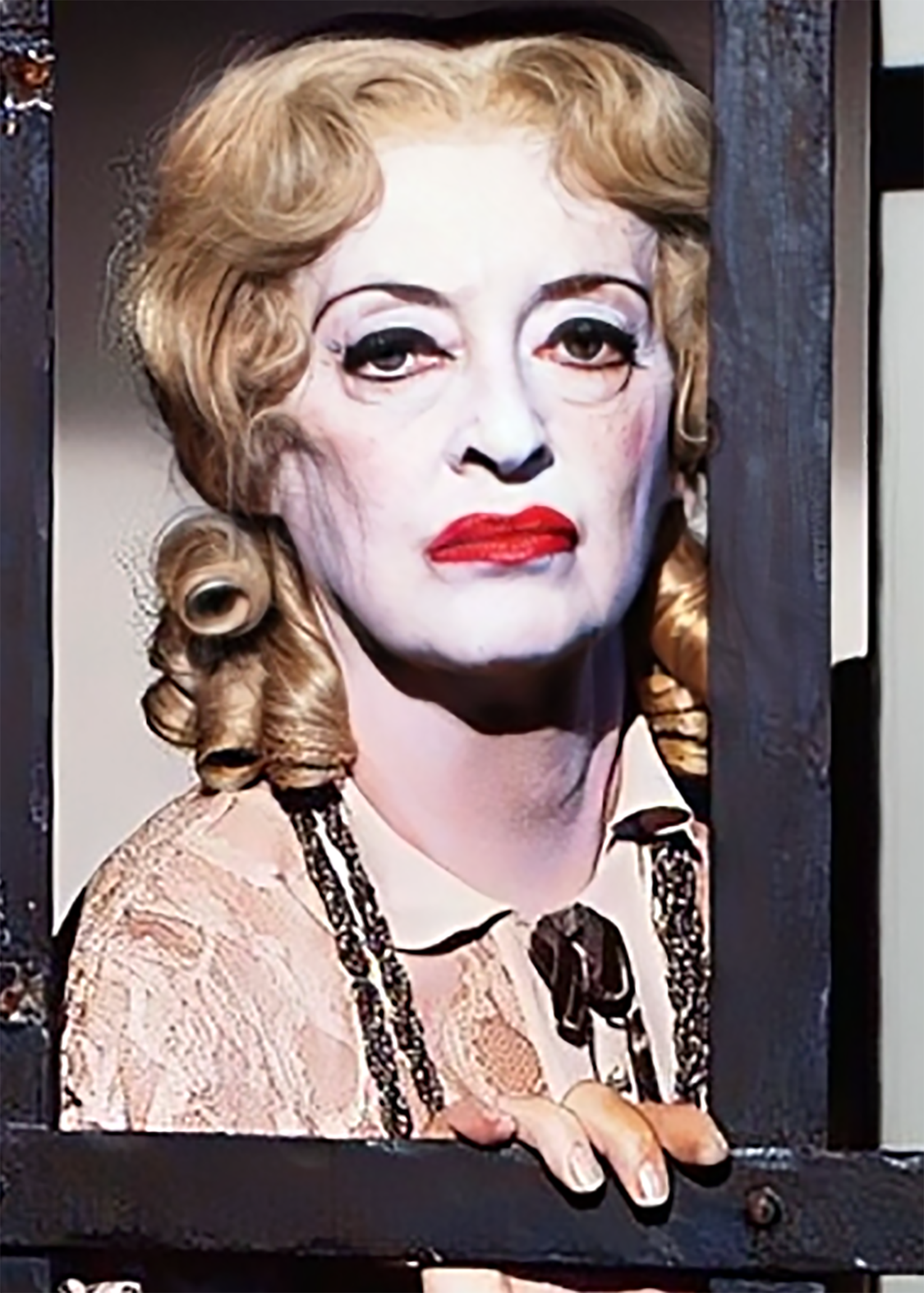
Davis as the titular character in What Ever Happened to Baby Jane? (1962).

=== Academy Awards ===
Year	Category	Nominated work	Result	Ref.
Academy Awards
1935	Best Actress	Of Human Bondage (Write-in)	Nominated (Note: Although not an official nominee, most awards databases still include Davis's nomination for Of Human Bondage (1934), as well as others such as Paul Muni's for Black Fury (Best Actor, 1935) and Michael Curtiz's Captain Blood (Best Director, 1935), among the listed nominees. This is perhaps due to the fact that another write-in candidate, Hal Mohr, became the sole person to win via write-in submission, for the cinematography work on A Midsummer Night's Dream (1935). The Academy discontinued this rule relaxation as of the following ceremony.)	
1936	Best Actress	Dangerous	Won	
1939	Best Actress	Jezebel	Won	
1940	Best Actress	Dark Victory	Nominated	
1941	Best Actress	The Letter	Nominated	
1942	Best Actress	The Little Foxes	Nominated	
1943	Best Actress	Now, Voyager	Nominated	
1945	Best Actress	Mr. Skeffington	Nominated	
1951	Best Actress	All About Eve	Nominated	
1953	Best Actress	The Star	Nominated	
1963	Best Actress	What Ever Happened to Baby Jane?	Nominated	

=== BAFTA Awards ===
Year	Category	Nominated work	Result	Ref.
British Academy Film Awards
1964	Best Foreign Actress	What Ever Happened to Baby Jane?	Nominated	

=== Golden Globe Awards ===
Year	Category	Nominated work	Result	Ref.
Golden Globe Awards
1951	Best Actress in a Motion Picture – Drama	All About Eve	Nominated	
1962	Best Actress in a Motion Picture – Comedy or Musical	Pocketful of Miracles	Nominated	
1963	Best Actress in a Motion Picture – Drama	What Ever Happened to Baby Jane?	Nominated	
1974	Cecil B. DeMille Award	—N/a	Honored	

=== Emmy Awards ===
Year	Category	Nominated work	Result	Ref.
Primetime Emmy Awards
1974	Special Classification of Outstanding Program and Individual Achievement	ABC's Wide World of Entertainment: Warner Bros. Movies — A 50-Year Salute	Nominated	
1979	Outstanding Lead Actress in a Limited Series or Movie	Strangers: The Story of a Mother and Daughter	Won	
1980	Outstanding Lead Actress in a Limited Series or Movie	White Mama	Nominated	
1983	Outstanding Supporting Actress in a Limited Series or a Special	Little Gloria...Happy at Last	Nominated	

== Industry awards ==
Year	Awards ceremony	Category	Nominated work	Character	Result	Ref.
1937	Venice Film Festival	Volpi Cup for Best Actress	Kid Galahad	Louise "Fluff" Phillips	Won (Note: Some sources are inconsistent, with a few omitting Kid Galahad and one missing Marked Woman. But archived snapshot on Volpi Cup article page emphasizes she won for both titles.)	
1937	Venice Film Festival	Volpi Cup for Best Actress	Marked Woman	Mary Strauber	Won	
1939	New York Film Critics Circle	Best Actress	Dark Victory	Judith Traherne	Runner-Up (Note: Tied for 2nd Place with Greta Garbo for Ninotchka (1939).)	
1939	National Board of Review	Best Acting	Dark Victory	Judith Traherne	Won	both
1939	National Board of Review	Best Acting	The Old Maid	Charlotte Lovell	Won	both
1941	National Board of Review	Best Acting	The Little Foxes	Regina Giddens	Won	
1950	New York Film Critics Circle	Best Actress	All About Eve	Margo Channing	Won	
1951	Cannes Film Festival	Best Actress	All About Eve	Margo Channing	Won	
1952	Nastro d'Argento	Silver Ribbon for Best Foreign Actress	All About Eve	Margo Channing	Won	
1963	Laurel Awards	Top Female Dramatic Performance	What Ever Happened to Baby Jane?	Baby Jane Hudson	3rd Place	
1965	Laurel Awards	Top Female Dramatic Performance	Hush...Hush, Sweet Charlotte	Charlotte Hollis	Won	
1977	Saturn Awards	Best Supporting Actress	Burnt Offerings	Aunt Elizabeth Rolf	Won	
1983	Monte-Carlo Television Festival	Golden Nymph - Actress	A Piano for Mrs. Cimino	Mrs. Esther Cimino	Won	
1984	CableACE Awards	Actress in a Dramatic or Theatrical Program	Right of Way	Mini Dwyer	Nominated	
1987	CableACE Awards	Actress in a Dramatic or Theatrical Program	As Summers Die	Hannah Loftin	Nominated	

== Other accolades ==
=== Honorary ===
Year	Award	Category
1950	Grauman's Chinese Theatre	Handprint and Footprint Ceremony
1960	Hollywood Walk of Fame	Motion pictures (Location: 6225 Hollywood Blvd.)
1960	Hollywood Walk of Fame	Television (Location: 6233 Hollywood Blvd.)
1969	San Francisco International Film Festival	The Craft of Cinema Award
1973	Sarah Siddons Awards	Special 20th Anniversary Award for All About Eve
1977	American Film Institute	AFI Life Achievement Award
1982	Film Advisory Board	Award of Excellence
1982	Rudolph Valentino Award	Actress of the Year
1982	National Film Society Artistry in Cinema Awards	Golden Reel Award for her contribution to cinema.
1982	American Theater Arts	Life Achievement Award
1983	Charles Chaplin Award	Awarded by UCLA Film and Television Archive
1983	Women in Film Crystal + Lucy Awards	Crystal Award
1983	Boston Theater District	Life Achievement Award
1983	Golden Apple Awards	Louella Parsons Life Achievement Award
1986	César Awards	Honorary César
1986	Ordre des Arts et des Lettres	Appointed commander of this order. It was awarded by the French Government for her contribution to film.
1987	British Film Institute Fellowship	In recognition of her outstanding contribution to film culture.
1987	Legion of Honour	Awarded at the Deauville American Film Festival for her contribution to film.
1987	Kennedy Center Honors	Honoree
1988	Campione d'Italia	Merit of Achievement Award
1989	American Cinema Awards	Life Achievement Award
1989	Film Society of Lincoln Center	Gala Tribute
1989	San Sebastián International Film Festival	Donostia Award

=== Miscellaneous ===
Year	Award	Category	Notes
1932	N/A	Stars of Tomorrow	A group of theater exhibitors named Joan Blondell, Bette Davis, and Ginger Rogers "Stars of Tomorrow". The ceremony was held at the Ambassador Hotel in Hollywood, and broadcast live on radio. This was Bette's first acting award.
1939	Photoplay Awards	Best Performances (July)	Tied with Paul Muni
1941	Golden Apple Awards	Most Cooperative Actress	
1945	Photoplay Awards	Favorite Female Star	Gold Medal Nominee
1946	Meritorious Civilian Service Award	United States Department of War presented this accolade to Davis on behalf of her efforts in coordinating the foundation of the Hollywood Canteen.	The first thespian to receive such an award.
1950	Photoplay Awards	Best Performances (December)	Tied with Anne Baxter
1951	Photoplay Awards	Most Popular Female Star	Nominee for All About Eve
1963	Photoplay Awards	Most Popular Female Star	Nominee for What Ever Happened to Baby Jane?
1963	Golden Apple Awards	Most Cooperative Actress	
1965	Laurel Awards	Golden Laurel - Female Star	11th Place
1966	Photoplay Awards	Most Popular Female Star	Gold Medal Nominee
1972	Photoplay Awards	Favorite Female Star	
1975	Photoplay Awards	Favorite Female Star	
1976	Photoplay Awards	Favorite Female Star	
1978	Photoplay Awards	Hall of Fame: Actress	
1980	Outstanding Mother of the Year Award	Awarded by Woman's Day magazine	
1983	Distinguished Civilian Service Medal	Awarded by the Defense Department of USA (the highest civilian award given by the United States Department of Defense) for founding the Hollywood Canteen (which operated at 1451 Cahuenga Boulevard in Hollywood, California, between October 3, 1942, and November 22, 1945).	The award ceremony took place on June 11, 1983.

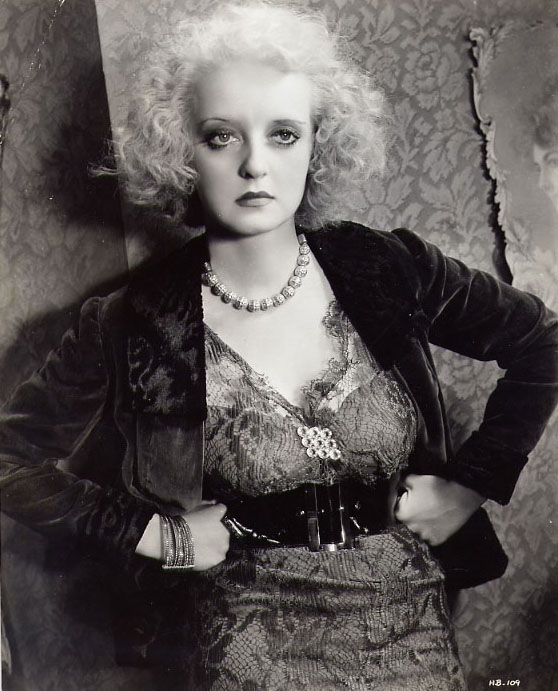
Davis in Of Human Bondage (1934), one of her first major films. Her performance was critically acclaimed.

== See also ==
- List of Bette Davis performances
- Academy Award for Best Actress
- List of Academy Award Records
- List of actors with three or more Academy Award nominations in acting categories
- List of actors with two or more Academy Awards in acting categories
