= Living (1954 TV program) =

Canadian television series

- Genre: Informational
- Presented by: Elaine Grand
- Country of origin: Canada
- Original language: English
- No. of seasons: 2

Production
- Producer: Ross McLean
- Running time: 30 minutes

Original release
- Network: CBC Television
- Release: 3 May 1954 – 1 July 1955

Living is a Canadian informational television program which aired on CBC Television from 1954 to 1955.

== Premise ==
Elaine Grand of Tabloid hosted the program, with topics geared towards women such as child-rearing, gardening, and homemaking. Various subjects were covered by interviews with experts such as cooking with Eristella Langdon, crafts with Peter Whittall (who later hosted Mr. Fixit), design with John Hall, fashion with Iona Monahan, family medical topics with physician S.R. Laycock, and gardening with Lois Lister. The show also covered more serious topics such as senior citizens concerns, adoption, and drinking water fluoridation.

== Scheduling ==
This half-hour program was broadcast at 7:30 p.m. on various selected weeknights from 3 May 1954 until 1 July 1955. The closure of Living coincided with Grand's departure for television projects in the United Kingdom such as Lucky Dip and Sharp at Four.
