= Seven-O-One =

- Also known as: 701
- Country of origin: Canada
- Original language: English
- No. of seasons: 3

Production
- Running time: 30 minutes

Original release
- Network: CBC Television
- Release: 12 September 1960 – September 1963

Related
- Tabloid

Seven-O-One (or 701) is a Canadian informational television program that aired on CBC Television. It ran from 1960 to 1963, and was a continuation of the predecessor program Tabloid.

== Premise ==
The program featured interviews, news and information, similar to its predecessor Tabloid.

== Hosts ==
Percy Saltzman presented the weather forecasts as he did with Tabloid, remaining with Seven-O-One until its cancellation. Max Ferguson and Joyce Davidson also carried over from Tabloid as hosts of the newly named series. Ferguson was later replaced by Alan Miller while Davidson left for the United States to host PM East/PM West with Mike Wallace. She was replaced by Betty-Jean Talbot. John O'Leary served as Seven-O-One's newscaster.

Other persons seen included Robert Fulford, Trent Frayne, Rex Loring and John Saywell.

== Production ==
Most of the program was produced in Toronto at CBLT studios.

Towards the end of Tabloid's run, producers introduced more serious news content in an attempt to boost audience interest. In mid-1962, a different set of hosts were seen as Tabloid originated from Montreal for several months. After resuming the show from Toronto later that year, Percy Saltzman was the only original host remaining from the original Tabloid line-up. Seven-O-One was cancelled in 1963, with Saltzman accusing CBC leadership of sabotaging the nature of the program with the more serious approach.

== Scheduling ==
Seven-O-One, as its name implied, began its broadcast each weekday at 7:01 p.m. (Eastern). It was a continuation of Tabloid whose title CBC dropped in 1960 after a drug manufacturer which held a trademark to its "Tabloid" product pressured the network. The last episode under the Tabloid name aired 9 September 1960.
