= Rex Loring =

Canadian announcer, anchorman, narrator

- Born: 25 November 1925; Totton, Hampshire, England
- Died: 17 April 2017 (aged 91)
- Citizenship: Canadian
- Occupations: Announcer; Anchorman; Narrator
- Years active: 1947–1990
- Employer: Canadian Broadcasting Corporation
- Organization: National Film Board of Canada

Rex Loring (November 25, 1925 - April 21, 2017) was a British-born Canadian radio announcer, best known as a longtime anchor of World Report, the morning newscast on the Canadian Broadcasting Corporation's radio news and talk network.

Born in Totton, Hampshire, England, he had begun studies in architecture at the University of London, while also taking some acting classes at the London Studio Centre. His studies were interrupted by the breakout of World War II, during which he worked as a transport pilot in the Royal Air Force.

== Career ==
Moving to Canada in 1947 to pursue work opportunities, he joined the National Film Board of Canada as a narrator of documentary films, and then worked in as an announcer for commercial radio stations such as CFCF in Montreal, CHEX in Peterborough and CKOY in Ottawa, before joining the CBC in 1955. He became a Canadian citizen in 1953.

With the CBC he was a host or announcer of television and radio programs such as Mr. Fixit, Tabloid, Seven-O-One, Close-Up, The Sound of Britain, On the Scene, and Festival, and was a frequent narrator of documentary films. He became anchor of The World at Eight, the predecessor of World Report, in 1971, and remained with the program when it was renamed World Report in 1982.

He retired from World Report in 1990. By this time, he was considered to be Canada's last remaining exemplar of the historic model of news broadcasting, in which newscasts were presented by people with a background in announcing rather than journalism, although he was paired with a journalist as cohost throughout his time as a newscaster. Although renowned for his composure and professionalism, at the time of his retirement he reminisced about one of his rare on-air bloopers, when he struggled to pronounce the unfamiliar name of northwestern Ontario's Wabigoon River.

== Personal life ==
Loring and his first wife Jill had two children: Elaine Loring is an arts and entertainment journalist who was a reporter for Global News in Toronto from 1984 to 2002, and Carolyn (Carrie) Loring is a singer and children's entertainer who was one of the hosts of Polka Dot Door. He later married writer Shirley Fox.

He died on April 21, 2017, aged 91.
