= George Schaefer Showcase Theatre =

George Schaefer Showcase Theatre was a syndicated series that ran on cable channels in the 1980s. It consisted of videotaped productions in color directed by George Schaefer which had originally been telecast on the Hallmark Hall of Fame and had been sold as a television package to stations around the U.S.

Among the programs were:

- Victoria Regina, with Julie Harris as Queen Victoria, James Donald as Prince Albert, and Basil Rathbone in what amounted to a cameo as Benjamin Disraeli.
- A ninety-minute version of Shakespeare's The Tempest, starring Maurice Evans, Lee Remick, Roddy MacDowall, and Richard Burton. It was Burton's only performance in an American made-for-television production of a Shakespeare play.
- Lamp at Midnight, a play about the 17th Century conflict between the Catholic Church and Galileo, starring Melvyn Douglas.
- The Invincible Mr. Disraeli, with Trevor Howard in the title role.

These programs were sometimes broadcast on late-night television, as if they were forgotten old films, but they were often award-winning or award-nominated television specials that were telecast in the 1960s.
