= Harvey (1996 film) =

1999 American made-for-TV movie

- Based on: Harvey; 1944 play by Mary Chase
- Teleplay by: Joseph Dougherty
- Directed by: George Schaefer
- Starring: Harry Anderson; Leslie Nielsen; Swoosie Kurtz
- Music by: Ragnar Rosinkranz
- Country of origin: United States
- Original language: English

Production
- Executive producers: Robert Halmi; Don Gregory
- Producer: Lisa Towers
- Cinematography: David Geddes
- Editor: Michael Eliot
- Running time: 120 minutes
- Production companies: Don Gregory Productions; Hallmark Entertainment

Original release
- Network: CBS
- Release: July 18, 1999

Harvey is a 1996 American made-for-television fantasy-comedy film and a remake of the blockbuster American comedy drama 1950 classic film (starring James Stewart) based on Mary Chase's 1944 play of the same name. The television adaptation was directed by George Schaefer (his final film project) and starred Harry Anderson (as the eccentric Elwood P. Dowd), Leslie Nielsen, and Swoosie Kurtz. Though it was filmed in 1996, the film sat on the shelf until July 18, 1999, when it was broadcast by CBS, two years after Schaefer and Stewart's deaths.

== Plot ==
Anderson plays the role of Elwood P. Dowd, an amiable but eccentric man whose best friend is an invisible, 6 foot, 3 ½ inch-tall (1.92 m) white rabbit named Harvey. Elwood explains that Harvey is a púca (pooka, a mostly benign but always mischievous spirit from Celtic mythology and fairytales). Elwood spends most of his time taking Harvey around town, drinking and talking at various bars and introducing Harvey to almost every person he meets, much to the puzzlement of strangers, though Elwood's family and friends have accepted Harvey's (supposed) existence.

His older sister Veta (Kurtz) and his niece Myrtle Mae live with him in his large estate, but have become social outcasts along with Elwood due to his bizarre behaviors in public and his obsession with Harvey. After Elwood ruins a party Veta and Myrtle Mae had arranged in secret, Veta finally tries to have him committed to a local sanatorium. In exasperation, she admits to the attending psychiatrist, Dr. Sanderson, that she sees Harvey every once in a while, herself, and that she has started to believe in his existence. Mistaking Veta as the real mental case, Sanderson has Elwood released and Veta locked up. Dr. Chumley, head of the sanatorium, discovers the mistake and realizes he must bring Elwood back, searching the town with Wilson, an orderly. With Veta's help, Chumley eventually tracks Elwood to his favorite bar, Charlie's, and decides to confront him alone.

Four hours later, Wilson returns to the sanatorium, but learns from Sanderson and nurse Kelly that Chumley has not returned with Elwood. They arrive at Charlie's and find Elwood alone; he explains that after several rounds of drinks, Dr. Chumley had wandered off chatting with Harvey. When asked, Elwood explains that he met Harvey down a street beside a lampost one day, leaning against a pole. Elwood was surprised when Harvey called him by his name; soon, they started talking about various things in the world and became fast friends. They had since enjoyed going to bars and socializing with other people. Convinced Elwood is insane and may have harmed Chumley, Wilson calls the police and has Elwood escorted back to the sanatorium.

Chumley returns to the sanatorium, disheveled and paranoid, and is followed by an invisible presence. When the others arrive, Chumley invites Elwood to his office. In private, Chumley says that he now knows Harvey is real, and Elwood explains Harvey's various powers, including his ability to stop time, send anyone to any destination for as long as they like, and then bring them back without a minute passing. Veta arrives with Judge Gaffney and Myrtle Mae, prepared to commit Elwood to make him "normal". They are convinced by Sanderson that an injection of a serum called "Formula 977" will stop Elwood from "seeing the rabbit".

As they prepare the injection, Veta tries to pay the cab driver, but upon emptying her purse, is unable to find her smaller coin purse. She interrupts the injection procedure and asks Elwood to pay the driver. Elwood, while paying the driver, starts a conversation about the driver's occupation. Warmed by Elwood's kindness, the cabdriver explains how he has driven many people to the sanatorium to receive the same medicine and how they enjoy the ride here, watching the sunset and talking about various things, some real, some not, but on the way back, the same people start shouting at the cabdriver, complaining how busy they are and that they are always running short of time. He warns Veta that Elwood will become like them,

"a perfectly normal human being, ... and you know what they are."

Veta is upset by this and halts the injection, bringing Elwood out of the examining room. At this, Judge Gaffney becomes annoyed and leaves. She then finds her coin purse and realizes that Harvey had intervened to save her brother.

As Elwood is about to leave, he finds Harvey near a staircase; they start walking back, but Dr. Chumley finds them and asks Elwood where he can find his own púca, to which Elwood replies, "He'll find you ... When you are ready."

In the ending scene, Veta and Elwood are seen smiling and playing the piano together in their mansion, while an empty chair rocks back and forth, supposedly with Harvey sitting on it.

== Cast ==
- Harry Anderson as Elwood P. Dowd
- Leslie Nielsen as Dr. Chumley
- Swoosie Kurtz as Veta Simmons
- Jonathan Banks as C.J. Lofgren, Cabdriver
- Jessica Hecht as Miss Ruth Kelly
- William Schallert as Judge Gaffney
- Lisa Akey as Myrtle Mae Simmons
- Jim O'Heir as Duane Wilson
- Robert Wisden as Dr. Sanderson
- Lynda Boyd as Mrs. Chumley
- Alex Ferguson as Zabladowski
- Sheila Moore as Mrs. Chauvenet
- Sheelah Megill as Miss Tewksbury
- Robin Kelly as Mrs. Greenwalt
- Ingrid Tesch as Girl Reporter

== Production ==
The film was shot in Vancouver, British Columbia, Canada.
