= 31st Primetime Emmy Awards =

1979 American television programming awards

- Date: September 9, 1979 (Ceremony); September 8, 1979 (Creative Arts Awards)
- Location: Pasadena Civic Auditorium, Pasadena, California
- Presented by: Academy of Television Arts and Sciences
- Hosted by: Henry Winkler; Cheryl Ladd

Highlights
- Most awards: All in the Family; Friendly Fire; The Jericho Mile; Lou Grant; Roots: The Next Generations; Taxi (2)
- Most nominations: Lou Grant (12)
- Outstanding Comedy Series: Taxi
- Outstanding Drama Series: Lou Grant
- Outstanding Limited Series: Roots: The Next Generations
- Outstanding Comedy-Variety or Music Program: Steve & Eydie Celebrate Irving Berlin

Television/radio coverage
- Network: ABC

The 31st Primetime Emmy Awards ceremony was held on Sunday, September 9, 1979. The ceremony was broadcast on the ABC. It was hosted by Henry Winkler and Cheryl Ladd. 23 awards were presented. This ceremony is remembered for problems with the Pasadena Civic Auditorium's air-conditioning.

The top shows of the night were Taxi, which pulled an upset in the Outstanding Comedy Series field when it beat All in the Family's final season, and Lou Grant, which received 12 major nominations and won two awards including Outstanding Drama Series.

For the first time, most of the Miniseries and Television Movie Categories were merged into one, this would become the standard for later ceremonies, culminating with the TV Movie and Miniseries Program Categories combining in 2011. For this year only, the comedy and variety categories were combined in acting, directing and writing. This combination would not stick, and the traditional categories returned the next year.

== Winners and nominees ==
=== Programs ===
Programs
Outstanding Comedy Series: Taxi (ABC); All in the Family (CBS); Barney Miller (ABC); M*A*S*H (CBS); Mork & Mindy (ABC)	Outstanding Drama Series: Lou Grant (CBS); The Paper Chase (NBC); The Rockford Files (NBC)
Outstanding Limited Series: Roots: The Next Generations (ABC); Backstairs at the White House (NBC); Blind Ambition (CBS)	Outstanding Drama or Comedy Special: Friendly Fire (ABC); Dummy (CBS); First, You Cry (CBS); The Jericho Mile (ABC); Summer of My German Soldier (NBC)
Outstanding Comedy-Variety or Music Program: Steve & Eydie Celebrate Irving Berlin (NBC); Arthur Fiedler: Just Call Me Maestro (PBS); The Muppet Show (Syndicated); Saturday Night Live (NBC); Shirley MacLaine at the Lido (CBS)

=== Acting ===
==== Lead performances ====
Acting
Outstanding Lead Actor in a Comedy Series: Carroll O'Connor as Archie Bunker in All in the Family (CBS); Alan Alda as Hawkeye Pierce in M*A*S*H (CBS); Judd Hirsch as Alex Reiger in Taxi (ABC); Hal Linden as Capt. Barney Miller in Barney Miller (ABC); Robin Williams as Mork in Mork & Mindy (ABC)	Outstanding Lead Actress in a Comedy Series: Ruth Gordon as Dee Wilcox in Taxi (ABC) (Episode: "Sugar Mama"); Katherine Helmond as Jessica Tate in Soap (ABC); Linda Lavin as Alice Hyatt in Alice (CBS); Isabel Sanford as Louise Jefferson in The Jeffersons (CBS); Jean Stapleton as Edith Bunker in All in the Family (CBS)
Outstanding Lead Actor in a Drama Series: Ron Leibman as Martin Kazinsky in Kaz (CBS); Edward Asner as Lou Grant in Lou Grant (CBS); James Garner as Jim Rockford in The Rockford Files (NBC); Jack Klugman as Dr. Quincy in Quincy, M.E. (NBC)	Outstanding Lead Actress in a Drama Series: Mariette Hartley as Dr. Caroline Fields in The Incredible Hulk (CBS) (Episode: "Married"); Barbara Bel Geddes as Eleanor Southworth Ewing Farlow in Dallas (CBS); Rita Moreno as Rita Capkovic in The Rockford Files (NBC) (Episode: "Rosendahl and Gilda Stern are Dead"); Sada Thompson as Kate Lawrence in Family (ABC)
Outstanding Lead Actor in a Limited Series or a Special: Peter Strauss as Larry "Rain" Murphy in The Jericho Mile (ABC); Ned Beatty as Gene Mullen in Friendly Fire (ABC); Louis Gossett Jr. as Houseman Levi Mercer in Backstairs at the White House (NBC); Kurt Russell as Elvis Presley in Elvis (ABC)	Outstanding Lead Actress in a Limited Series or a Special: Bette Davis as Lucy Mason in Strangers: The Story of a Mother and Daughter (CBS); Carol Burnett as Peg Mullen in Friendly Fire (NBC); Olivia Cole as Maggie Rogers in Backstairs at the White House (NBC); Katharine Hepburn as Miss Lilly Moffat in The Corn Is Green (CBS); Mary Tyler Moore as Betty Rollin in First, You Cry (CBS)

==== Supporting performances ====
Outstanding Supporting Actor in a Comedy or Comedy-Variety or Music Series: Robert Guillaume as Benson DuBois in Soap (ABC); Gary Burghoff as Radar O'Reilly in M*A*S*H (CBS); Danny DeVito as Louie De Palma in Taxi (ABC); Max Gail as Det. Stan Wojciehowicz in Barney Miller (ABC); Harry Morgan as Sherman T. Potter in M*A*S*H (CBS)	Outstanding Supporting Actress in a Comedy or Comedy-Variety or Music Series: Sally Struthers as Gloria Bunker-Stivic in All in the Family (CBS) (Episode: "California, Here We Are"); Polly Holliday as Florence Jean Castleberry in Alice (CBS); Marion Ross as Marion Cunningham in Happy Days (CBS); Loretta Swit as Margaret Houlihan in M*A*S*H (CBS)
Outstanding Continuing Performance by a Supporting Actor in a Drama Series: Stuart Margolin as Evelyn "Angel" Martin in The Rockford Files (NBC); Mason Adams as Charlie Hume in Lou Grant (CBS); Noah Beery, Jr. as Joseph Rockford in The Rockford Files (NBC); Joe Santos as Det. Dennis Becker in The Rockford Files (NBC); Robert Walden as Joe Rossi in Lou Grant (CBS)	Outstanding Continuing Performance by a Supporting Actress in a Drama Series: Kristy McNichol as Letitia Lawrence in Family (ABC); Linda Kelsey as Billie Newman in Lou Grant (CBS); Nancy Marchand as Margaret Pynchon in Lou Grant (CBS)
Outstanding Supporting Actor in a Limited Series or a Special: Marlon Brando as George Lincoln Rockwell in Roots: The Next Generations (ABC) (Episode: "Part VII"); Ed Flanders as President Calvin Coolidge in Backstairs at the White House (NBC) (Episode: "Book Two"); Al Freeman, Jr. as Malcolm X in Roots: The Next Generations (ABC) (Episode: "Part VII"); Robert Vaughn as President Woodrow Wilson in Backstairs at the White House (NBC) (Episode: "Book One"); Paul Winfield as Dr. Horace Huguley in Roots: The Next Generations (ABC) (Episode: "Part V")	Outstanding Supporting Actress in a Limited Series or a Special: Esther Rolle as Ruth in Summer of My German Soldier (NBC); Ruby Dee as Queen Haley in Roots: The Next Generations (ABC); Colleen Dewhurst as Mrs. O'Neil in Silent Victory: The Kitty O'Neil Story (CBS); Eileen Heckart as Eleanor Roosevelt in Backstairs at the White House (NBC); Celeste Holm as Florence Harding on Backstairs at the White House (NBC)

=== Directing ===
Directing
Outstanding Directing in a Comedy or Comedy-Variety or Music Series: Barney Miller (ABC): "The Harris Incident" – Noam Pitlik; All in the Family (CBS): "California, Here We Are, Part II" – Paul Bogart; M*A*S*H (CBS): "Dear Sis" – Alan Alda; M*A*S*H (CBS): "Point of View" – Charles S. Dubin; Soap (ABC): "Episode #27" – Jay Sandrich	Outstanding Directing in a Drama Series: The White Shadow (CBS): "Pilot" – Jackie Cooper; Lou Grant (CBS): "Murder" – Mel Damski; Lou Grant (CBS): "Prisoner" – Gene Reynolds; Lou Grant (CBS): "Schools" – Burt Brinckerhoff
Outstanding Directing in a Limited Series or a Special: Friendly Fire (ABC) – David Greene; Les Misérables (CBS) – Glenn Jordan; Silent Victory: The Kitty O'Neil Story (CBS) – Lou Antonio

=== Writing ===
Writing
Outstanding Writing in a Comedy or Comedy-Variety or Music Series: M*A*S*H (CBS): "Inga" – Alan Alda; All in the Family (CBS): "California, Here We Are - Part II" – Milt Josefsberg, Phil Sharp, Bob Schiller and Bob Weiskopf; M*A*S*H (CBS): "Point of View" – Ken Levine and David Isaacs; Saturday Night Live (NBC): "Host - Richard Benjamin"; Taxi (ABC): "Blind Date" – Michael Leeson	Outstanding Writing in a Drama Series: Lou Grant (CBS): "Dying" – Michele Gallery; Lou Grant (CBS): "Marathon" – Gene Reynolds; Lou Grant (CBS): "Vet" – Leon Tokatyan; The Paper Chase (CBS): "The Late Mr. Hart" – James Bridges
Outstanding Writing in a Limited Series or a Special: The Jericho Mile (ABC) – Story by : Patrick J. Nolan Screenplay by : Patrick J. Nolan and Michael Mann; Backstairs at the White House (NBC): "Book One" – Paul Dubov and Gwen Bagni; Friendly Fire (ABC) – Fay Kanin; Roots: The Next Generations (ABC): "Part I" – Ernest Kinoy; Summer of My German Soldier (NBC) – Jane-Howard Hammerstein

== Most major nominations ==
Networks with multiple major nominations (Note: "Major" constitutes the categories listed above: Program, Acting, Directing, and Writing. Does not include the technical categories.)
Network	Number of nominations
CBS	46
ABC	30
NBC	23

Programs with multiple major nominations
Program	Category	Network	Number of nominations
Lou Grant	Drama	CBS	12
M*A*S*H	Comedy	CBS	9
Backstairs at the White House	Limited	CBS	8
All in the Family	Comedy	CBS	6
The Rockford Files	Drama	NBC	6
Roots: The Next Generations	Limited	ABC	6
Friendly Fire	Special	ABC	5
Taxi	Comedy	ABC	5
Barney Miller	Comedy	ABC	4
The Jericho Mile	Special	ABC	3
Soap	Comedy	ABC	3
Summer of My German Soldier	Special	NBC	3
Alice	Comedy	CBS	2
Family	Drama	ABC	2
First, You Cry	Special	CBS	2
Mork & Mindy	Comedy	ABC	2
The Paper Chase	Drama	NBC	2
Saturday Night Live	Variety	NBC	2
Silent Victory: The Kitty O'Neil Story	Special	CBS	2

== Most major awards ==
Networks with multiple major awards
Network	Number of Awards
ABC	11
CBS	9
NBC	3

Programs with multiple major awards
Program	Category	Network	Number of Awards
All in the Family	Comedy	CBS	2
Friendly Fire	Special	ABC	2
The Jericho Mile	Special	ABC	2
Lou Grant	Drama	CBS	2
Roots: The Next Generations	Miniseries	ABC	2
Taxi	Comedy	ABC	2

== Presenters ==
- Hal Linden
- Melissa Gilbert and Louis Gossett Jr.
- Ken Howard and Ron Howard
- Gary David Goldberg
- Bonnie Franklin
- Norman Fell
- Pam Dawber
- Tim Conway
- Robert Conrad
- John Houseman
- Penny Marshall
- Ricardo Montalban
- Mary Tyler Moore
- Donna Pescow
- Victoria Principal
- Robert Urich
- Marlo Thomas and Richard Thomas
- David L. Wolper
