= Chrysler Festival =

Television series

- Genre: Concert
- Directed by: Don Hudson
- Presented by: Elaine Grand; Hume Cronyn
- Country of origin: Canada
- Original language: English
- No. of seasons: 1
- No. of episodes: 6

Production
- Executive producer: Stuart W. Griffiths
- Producer: Franz Kraemer
- Running time: 60 minutes

Original release
- Network: CBC Television
- Release: 14 November 1956 – 17 April 1957

Chrysler Festival is a Canadian variety concert television miniseries that aired on CBC Television in 1957.

== Premise ==
The concerts were recorded at Loew's Uptown Theatre in Toronto, with two thousand attendees in the theatre. Lucio Agostini was the series musical director.

== Scheduling ==
The series aired on selected Wednesdays at 10:00 p.m. (Eastern time) as a mid-year replacement for Folio. Episodes were broadcast as follows:

1. 14 November 1956: The Dave Brubeck Quartet, Edmund Hockridge, Shirley Jones, Eartha Kitt, Royal Winnipeg Ballet
2. 28 November 1956: Larry Adler, Percy Faith, Tito Gobbi with Pilar Lorengar, Bob Hamilton Trio (American dance group), Peter Sellers
3. 23 January 1957: Lisa Della Casa with Richard Tucker (opera duet), Ferrante & Teicher, José Greco, Edith Piaf, La Ronde from New Faces of 1956
4. 20 February 1957: Kaye Ballard, Rosemary Clooney with Bill Johnson, Dorothy Dandridge, Maureen Forrester, Glenn Gould, Mata and Hari (dancers)
5. 20 March 1957: André Eglevsky, The Four Lads, Melissa Hayden, George Shearing Quintet.
6. 17 April 1957: Marian Anderson, George London, Oscar Peterson Trio
