= Elaine Grand =

Canadian broadcaster (1926–2001)

Elaine Grand (née Hill; 8 June 1926 – 30 April 2001) was a Canadian broadcaster.

Elaine Hill was born in Winnipeg, Manitoba. Her father, George Hill, had been born in England but had migrated to Canada and served in the Canadian Army, where he was in the Princess Patricia's Canadian Light Infantry Band which toured America and Europe in the interwar years. Her mother was an art and music teacher. Hill attended Kelvin High School, graduating in 1942. She later married Solomon Grand, who died in 1953. She trained as a fashion illustrator before moving to television; she was the interviewer for the Canadian Broadcasting Corporation's Tabloid from 1953 to 1956 and was, according to The Guardian, "the most famous woman in Canada" at that time.

In 1956, she moved to England and joined ITV, though she continued to work in Canadian television for a while, presenting Chrysler Festival (1957). During the late 1950s, Grand presented 'We Want an Answer' for Granada Television, Manchester. In 1960 she married the playwright Reuben Ship. She produced documentaries including Unmarried Mothers (1963) and in the 1970s and 1980s became one of the interviewers for Thames Television's Afternoon Plus (alongside Mavis Nicholson, Judith Chalmers and Mary Parkinson), a talk show that attracted a wide range of interviewees. Broadcast during the daytime, it was initially targeted towards housewives, but, with unemployment growing, its editor Catherine Freeman turned it into a serious interview format.

As The Guardian commented, Grand "brought the art of intelligent interviewing to a wide and growing audience ... [she] was one of a handful of broadcasters who changed the face of daytime television in Britain" through her interviews with politicians, thinkers, writers and other notable figures. She died on 30 April 2001.
