= George Schaefer (director) =

American film director (1920–1997)

- Born: George Louis Schaefer; December 16, 1920; Wallingford, Connecticut, US
- Died: September 10, 1997 (aged 76); Los Angeles, California, US

George Louis Schaefer (December 16, 1920 – September 10, 1997) was an American director of television and Broadway theatre, who was active from the 1950s to the 1990s.

== Life and career ==
Schaefer was born in Wallingford, Connecticut, and lived in Oak Park, Illinois for much of his boyhood and young adulthood. He was the son of Elsie (née Otterbein) and Louis Schaefer, who worked in sales. Schaefer studied stage directing at the Yale School of Drama. He began his directing career while serving in the U.S. Army Special Services during World War II. He directed over 50 plays for the troops. After being discharged, he directed for the Broadway theatre. His first production was of Shakespeare's Hamlet starring Maurice Evans. In 1953, Schaefer won a Tony Award for his production of The Teahouse of the August Moon which he co-produced with Evans.

During the Golden Age of Television, Schaefer directed numerous live TV adaptations of Broadway plays for NBC's Hallmark Hall of Fame. His first episode for Hallmark was an adaptation of his Broadway staging of Hamlet starring Evans and co-directed by Albert McCleery. In the 1980s, several of his productions for Hallmark aired in syndication under the title George Schaefer Showcase Theatre. His television work garnered him five Emmy wins out of 21 total nominations. He also won four Directors Guild of America Awards out of 17 nominations. He holds the record for the most DGA Award nominations. He also directed five theatrical films, but to limited success.

In February 1962, actors who had worked with Schaefer, including Ed Wynn, Ethel Griffies and Boris Karloff, participated in a tribute to him on the late-night talk show PM East/PM West that was syndicated by Group W Productions to Westinghouse-owned television stations in Boston, Baltimore, Pittsburgh, Cleveland, and San Francisco, as well as to other stations in Washington D.C., New York, and Los Angeles.

This telecast holds the distinction of being the only episode of PM East/PM West, which aired five nights a week for more than a year, to survive in its entirety. A videocassette of the 1962 telecast is available for viewing at the UCLA Film and Television Archive.

PM East/PM West was never accessible in Chicago, Illinois, the American South, the Southwestern United States, the Pacific Northwest or in the states of Florida or Texas.

From 1979 to 1981, George Schaefer was president of the Directors Guild of America. He was as a board member of President Ronald Reagan's National Council on the Arts from 1982 to 1988. In 1985, he was appointed Chairman and later associate Dean at the UCLA School of Theater Film and Television where he stayed until 1991.

During the 1980s and 1990s Schaefer served on the advisory board of the National Student Film Institute. Schaefer also was the Honorary Chairperson of the Institute for a one-year term.

In 1996, he released his autobiography From Live to Tape to Film: 60 Years of Inconspicuous Directing.

Schaefer continued directing TV movies until his death in 1997. His final TV movie was an adaptation of Harvey. He was survived by his wife, Mildred Trares (1931–2020), whom he had married in 1954.

== Selected television work ==
- Hamlet (1953)
- Macbeth (1954)
- Richard II (1954)
- One Touch of Venus (1955)
- Alice in Wonderland (1955)
- The Taming of the Shrew (1956)
- Man and Superman (1956)
- The Corn Is Green (1956)
- The Green Pastures (1957)
- The Yeomen of the Guard (1957)
- Kiss Me, Kate (1958)
- The Gift of the Magi (1958)
- Meet Me in St. Louis (1959)
- A Doll's House (1959)
- Winterset (1959)
- The Tempest (1960)
- Macbeth (1960)
- Victoria Regina (1961), adapted from Laurence Housman's play of the same name
- Arsenic & Old Lace (1962)
- Pygmalion (1963)
- Abe Lincoln in Illinois (1964)
- Inherit the Wind (1965)
- The Magnificent Yankee (1965)
- Eagle in a Cage (1965)
- Lamp at Midnight (1966)
- Barefoot in Athens (1966)
- Saint Joan (1967)
- The Admirable Crichton (1968)
- Gideon (1971)
- A War of Children (1972)
- F. Scott Fitzgerald and 'The Last of the Belles' (1974)
- Carl Sandburg's Lincoln (1974–76)
- The Last of Mrs. Lincoln (1976)
- Amelia Earhart (1976)
- Our Town (1977)
- The Second Barry Manilow Special (1978)
- First, You Cry (1978)
- Mayflower: The Pilgrims' Adventure (1979)
- The Bunker (1981)
- The People vs. Jean Harris (1981)
- The Deadly Game (1982)
- A Piano for Mrs. Cimino (1982)
- The Best Christmas Pageant Ever (1983)
- Right of Way (1983)
- Stone Pillow (1985)
- Mrs. Delafield Wants to Marry (1986)
- Laura Lansing Slept Here (1988)
- The Man Upstairs (1992)
- Harvey (1996)

== Selected Broadway theatre productions ==
- Hamlet (1945–1946)
- Man and Superman (1947–1948)
- The Teahouse of the August Moon (1953–1956) (co-producing only)
- The Apple Cart (1956–1957)
- Zenda (1963; closed out-of-town)
- The Last of Mrs. Lincoln (1972–1973)

== Filmography ==
- Pendulum (1969)
- Generation (1969)
- Doctors' Wives (1971)
- Once Upon a Scoundrel (1974)
- An Enemy of the People (1978)
- Children in the Crossfire (1984)
- Stone Pillow (1985)
