= Mr. Fixit (TV series) =

- Genre: Home improvement
- Presented by: Rex Loring
- Starring: Peter Whittall
- Country of origin: Canada
- Original language: English
- No. of seasons: 10

Production
- Producers: Don MacPherson (1955–1963); Bill Bolt (1963–1965)
- Running time: 15 minutes

Original release
- Network: CBC Television
- Release: 8 October 1955 – 30 June 1965

Mr. Fixit is a Canadian instructional television program that aired on CBC Television from 1955 to 1965.

== Premise ==
The series demonstrated home repairs and construction by Peter Whittall, previously seen on Living. Whittall, nicknamed Mr. Fixit, was joined by host Rex Loring. Due to its 15-minute time slot, Mr. Fixit concentrated on basic repair and construction techniques.

== Scheduling ==
The first five seasons of this 15-minute series were broadcast on Saturdays at 6:30 p.m. (Eastern) from the debut on 8 October 1955. As of 2 July 1960, the series was moved to a Wednesday 7:45 p.m. time slot where it remained until its last broadcast on 30 June 1965. One of its earlier directors was Patrick Watson.

== Reception ==
By 1962, the series attracted approximately 33,000 viewer letters annually according to CBC estimates.
