= Joyce Davidson =

Television presenter (1931–2020)

- Born: Joyce Inez Brock; 14 April 1931; Saskatoon, Saskatchewan, Canada
- Died: 7 May 2020 (aged 89); Toronto, Ontario, Canada
- Occupations: Television presenter, producer
- Years active: 1950s–1980s
- Employer(s): CBC Television, CFTO-TV, Westinghouse Broadcasting
- Spouses: Doug Davidson (m. c. 1948; div. c. 1954); David Susskind (m. 1966; div. 1986)
- Children: 3

Joyce Davidson (14 April 1931 – 7 May 2020) was a television personality in Canada and the United States.

== Early life ==
She was born Joyce Inez Brock in Saskatoon, Saskatchewan during the Great Depression and was the eldest of four children of Myrtle and Eric Brock. Her father was from England and was a veteran of the First World War while her mother came from a Norwegian family of 11 children. Davidson grew up in the industrial centre of Hamilton, Ontario, where her family moved so that her father could search for work. In Hamilton, her mother found work as a secretary at the Firestone Tire and Rubber Company, while her father, who suffered from health problems, "came and went".

== Career ==
Davidson was a young housewife in Hamilton, Ontario when she entered a beauty contest and won $400 and a trip to New York City. Her contest victory led to her picture appearing in a few magazines. In 1954, CBC Television's new Hamilton affiliate, CHCH-TV opened and Davidson, who had been working in a factory, applied for a job and was hired as an assistant on a cooking show. She then began appearing in television commercials on CHCH and then at CBLT in nearby Toronto. In 1956, she was hired to fill a vacancy as a presenter and interviewer on CBC Television's Tabloid, a national current affairs program with a light entertainment format and was also a contributor to CBC's Close-Up and On the Scene.

Davidson caused controversy while the Canadian media was reporting on the tour of the country by Elizabeth II, Queen of Canada, that began on 18 June 1959. On that day, Davidson was on a trip to New York City and was interviewed by Dave Garroway on NBC's Today show. There, she said on-camera, "Like most Canadians, I am indifferent to the visit of the Queen," and said, "we're a little annoyed at still being dependent." Davidson was lambasted in the Canadian press and by many indignant Canadians for her comment. The CBC received angry phone calls from viewers, her show lost sponsors, Conservative Members of Parliament expressed their outrage to Prime Minister John Diefenbaker, and Davidson was suspended from the programme. Within a few days, she resigned from CBC's Tabloid series. A subsequent Gallup poll showed that 64% of Canadians disagreed with her, although only 48% of respondents considered themselves significantly interested in the royal visit.

In addition to losing her hosting position on Tabloid, her revenue from doing commercials on Canadian television also dried up and her children were taunted at school. According to Here's Looking at Us: Celebrating Fifty Years of CBC-TV, Davidson also faced public criticism "for telling Pierre Berton in an interview that a woman who was still a virgin at age thirty was 'unlucky.'" Chatelaine published an article on Davidson in the summer of 1960 titled "Must I leave Canada?"

Facing diminished work prospects in Canada, Davidson moved to the United States in 1961, having become a frequent contributor to the Today show. That year, she appeared as a guest panelist on several episodes of the U.S. television game show To Tell the Truth where she remarked on her first appearance, "I'm enjoying being an immigrant." She was hired to do commercials for Lux soap and by Westinghouse Broadcasting to be the sidekick of Mike Wallace on a new talk show he was hosting titled PM East/PM West. The nightly series, which featured Wallace and Davidson in New York and Terrence O'Flaherty hosting a separate segment in San Francisco, lasted from June 1961 to June 1962. Fans of occasional guest Barbra Streisand made and saved audiotapes of some of her appearances. Davidson can be heard talking for only a few seconds on that audio.

A long segment with Davidson interviewing Boris Karloff survives in the sole video-recorded episode, which is available for viewing at the UCLA Film and Television Archive. Telecast on television stations owned by Westinghouse and in a few other cities on 12 February 1962, the episode does not include Streisand. Westinghouse designed PM East/PM West to compete with The Tonight Show, which was then hosted by Jack Paar, but Paar and his network, NBC, attracted many more viewers.

In 1964, Davidson began working as co-producer of a television talk show titled Hot Line that was broadcast locally in New York. The producer, David Susskind, also appeared on-camera, but Davidson did not. The host was Gore Vidal, and Dorothy Kilgallen appeared on most episodes.

Hot Line was a different show from Susskind's nationally known Open End talk show. Hot Line was the first television show to use the recently invented ten-second broadcast delay to amplify viewer phone calls on the air. Davidson screened the viewer phone calls. She also made the first approach to some of the people who appeared as guests on Hot Line, including Malcolm X, whom she invited for Hot Line immediately after he gave a speech at The Town Hall. The Hot Line telecast of 2 February 1965 turned out to be Malcolm's final television talk appearance during his lifetime, although he and his wife can be heard talking twelve days later on locally telecast newscast reports of the bombing of their home, which was located in New York's borough of Queens.

Late on Sunday night, 6 June 1971, an American talk show titled Joyce and Barbara: For Adults Only made its debut in syndication. The program fared poorly and disappeared several weeks later despite three advantages. Davidson's husband's nationally successful talk show served as a lead-in for it, her co-host was Barbara Howar and Bette Davis was the guest on the premiere.

Davidson hosted The Joyce Davidson Show, a Canadian weekday afternoon talk show produced by CFTO-TV for the CTV Television Network during the 1977–78 season. The show's theme song was "Breezin'" by George Benson.

In 1980, she returned to CBC to host Authors, a series of long-form interviews with Canadian writers. In 1981, Davidson went to India for three weeks to work on a documentary about Mother Teresa for PBS. Later in the decade, she co-hosted the ACTRA Awards on CBC Television.

== Personal life ==
Though born in Saskatoon, Davidson grew up in Hamilton, Ontario where she married Doug Davidson, a metal-lathe operator and amateur hockey and lacrosse player, when she was 17. The couple had two daughters by the time Davidson was 20. She divorced by the time she was 23. Davidson later said of the marriage "We were too young when we got married, and when we grew up we had nothing to talk about." In 1966, she married David Susskind in Arlington, Virginia less than two years after they began working together on Hot Line. Davidson had a third daughter with Susskind. For many years, the couple lived with Davidson's three daughters in the United Nations Plaza building in Manhattan. They separated in 1984 and divorced in 1986 but had been considering reconciliation shortly before Susskind's death in early 1987.

After David Susskind's death, Davidson remained in New York until 1996. At that time she became one of the producers of the 11:00 pm local news on WSYX channel 6 in Columbus, Ohio. In 2000, she moved back to Toronto where her two older daughters lived, and she resided in the Manulife Centre. In later life, she suffered from Parkinson's-related dementia and moved to a long-term care facility around 2012.

== Death ==
Davidson died at 89 from complications of COVID-19 in Toronto on 7 May 2020, during the COVID-19 pandemic in Ontario. She had been residing in Meighen Manor, a long-term care facility where at least 38 residents had died from the pandemic by the time of her death.
