= PM East/PM West =

American late night talk show, 1961–1962

PM East/PM West is a late-night talk show hosted by Mike Wallace and Joyce Davidson in New York City (where the PM East portion originated) and San Francisco Chronicle television critic Terrence O'Flaherty in San Francisco (PM West). The program was seen five nights a week from June 12, 1961, to June 22, 1962.

The show was syndicated by Group W Productions to Westinghouse-owned television stations in Boston, Baltimore, Pittsburgh, Cleveland, San Francisco, as well as to other stations in Washington D.C., New York, Los Angeles and Dallas, Texas. It was scheduled at the same time as NBC's The Tonight Show, then hosted by Jack Paar. Westinghouse, which was only a broadcaster that syndicated its programs through Group W, attempted to compete with NBC, which had had a monopoly on late-night television since Steve Allen had originated The Tonight Show in 1954.

PM East/PM West was never accessible in Chicago, Illinois, the American South, the Pacific Northwest or in the state of Florida. WFAA channel 8 in Dallas, Texas carried it starting with the first episode, but viewers in other Texas cities and in the American Southwest never watched it.

== Episode status ==
Audio recordings of some of Barbra Streisand's appearances constitute nearly all that survives. The sole episode known to exist in its entirety with moving images and sound, available for viewing at the UCLA Film and Television Archive, is the February 12, 1962, telecast, which was a tribute to George Schaefer. It features actors who worked with Schaefer, including Boris Karloff (who is interviewed by Davidson), Ed Wynn, and Ethel Griffies. Streisand does not appear, nor does anyone mention her name.

In 2018, someone uploaded to YouTube a clip that lasts 4 minutes 46 seconds from an episode in which the guests include comedian Dick Gregory and Victor Lownes, an executive with the company that later became known as Playboy Enterprises. The company owned the Chicago location of the Playboy Club where Gregory performed a short time before his appearance on PM East. As already noted, the program was not seen in Chicago, so it could not help the Playboy Club promote appearances there by Gregory or any other performer.
