= Westinghouse Broadcasting =

American broadcasting company

Westinghouse Broadcasting Company
- Trade name: Group W
- Formerly: Westinghouse Radio Stations, Inc. (1920–1954)
- Type: Division
- Industry: Radio and television broadcasting
- Founded: November 2, 1920; 106 years ago, in East Pittsburgh, Pennsylvania, U.S. (with the establishment of KDKA)
- Defunct: 1999; 27 years ago (as a licensee of Infinity); 2000; 26 years ago (as an independent company)
- Fate: Merged into CBS, remained as a licensee until 1999
- Successors: CBS Television Stations; Audacy, Inc.; CBS Media Ventures
- Headquarters: New York City, United States
- Area served: United States
- Parent: Westinghouse Electric

The Westinghouse Broadcasting Company, also known as Group W, was the broadcasting division of Westinghouse Electric Corporation. It owned several radio and television stations across the United States and distributed television shows for syndication.

Westinghouse Broadcasting was formed in the 1920s as Westinghouse Radio Stations, Inc. After expanding into television, it was renamed as Westinghouse Broadcasting Company in 1954, and adopted the Group W moniker on May 20, 1963. It was a self-contained entity within the Westinghouse corporate structure; while the parent company was headquartered in Pittsburgh, Pennsylvania, Westinghouse Broadcasting maintained headquarters in New York City. It kept national sales offices in Chicago and Los Angeles. After its merger with CBS in 2000, the majority of the broadcast assets today are owned by Skydance Corporation.

Group W stations are best known for using a distinctive corporate typeface, introduced in 1963, for their logos and on-air imaging. Similarly styled typefaces had been used on some non-Group W stations as well and several former Group W stations still use it today. The Group W corporate typeface has been digitized and released freely by John Sizemore; Ray Larabie's font "Anklepants borrows heavily from the typeface and is occasionally used as a substitute. The font is also used in the video game Damnation.

Westinghouse Broadcasting was also well known for two long-running television programs, the Mike Douglas Show and PM Magazine (called Evening Magazine in Group W's core broadcast markets).

== History ==
=== Radio origins ===
The Westinghouse Electric and Manufacturing Company entered broadcasting with the November 2, 1920, sign-on of KDKA radio in Pittsburgh. The oldest surviving licensed commercial radio station in the United States, KDKA was an outgrowth of experimental station 8XK, a 75-watt station that was located in the Pittsburgh suburb of Wilkinsburg, and founded in 1916 by Westinghouse assistant chief engineer Frank Conrad.

Westinghouse launched three more radio stations between 1920 and 1921: WJZ, originally licensed to Newark, New Jersey; WBZ, first located in Springfield, Massachusetts; and KYW, originally based in Chicago. WBZA in Boston, a station which shared WBZ's frequency and simulcasted WBZ's programming, signed on in November 1924.

Westinghouse was one of the founding owners of the Radio Corporation of America (RCA) in 1919, and in 1926 RCA established the National Broadcasting Company (NBC), a group of 24 radio stations that made up the first radio network in the United States. Westinghouse initially owned a 20 percent stake in NBC, and as a result, all of Westinghouse's stations became affiliates of NBC's Blue Network when it was launched on January 1, 1927. Most of the Blue Network's programming originated at WJZ, which in 1923 had its license moved to New York City, and its ownership transferred to RCA.

In 1931, Westinghouse switched the call letters of its two Massachusetts stations, with WBZA moving to Springfield and WBZ going to Boston. The two stations had suffered from interference problems, though the Boston facility was the more powerful of the two. In 1934, KYW was moved from Chicago to Philadelphia following a Federal Communications Commission-dictated frequency realignment. Westinghouse's next station was its first purchase: WOWO in Fort Wayne, Indiana, joined the group in August 1936.

The North American Regional Broadcasting Agreement of 1941 saw all of Westinghouse's original stations move to their current frequencies. With WOWO's power increase to 50,000 watts later that year, the Westinghouse stations were now also clear-channel stations. A decade later, the FCC forbade common ownership of two or more clear channel stations with overlapping nighttime coverage, though the commission allowed Westinghouse to keep WBZ, KYW, KDKA, and WOWO together under a grandfather clause. Among them, the four stations' nighttime signals blanketed almost all of the eastern half of North America. Despite the assignments which resulted from NARBA, WBZA became a 1,000-watt daytime-only operation as it continued to share a frequency with WBZ.

The Westinghouse group survived the government-dictated split of NBC's radio division in 1943. WBZ/WBZA, KDKA, and KYW became affiliates of NBC's Red Network while WOWO, which had a secondary affiliation with the Blue Network, fell back on its primary relationship with CBS. Westinghouse expanded to the West Coast in 1944 with its purchase of 5,000-watt KEX in Portland, Oregon, a station which also shared a frequency with WOWO. Westinghouse would increase KEX's power to 50,000 watts in 1948.

Later in the 1940s, Westinghouse moved on to develop FM and television stations as the FCC began to issue permits for those services. Westinghouse built FM sister stations for WBZ/WBZA, KDKA, KYW, KEX, and WOWO, all of which were on the air by the end of the decade. FM radio was, initially, an unsuccessful venture for Westinghouse, and the company would silence most of its FM stations during the 1950s. Of the early Westinghouse FMs, only the original KDKA-FM (now WLTJ) and the second WBZ-FM facility (now WMJX) proved to be worth keeping, and Westinghouse sold those outlets in the early 1980s.

Moving back to AM radio, Westinghouse returned to Chicago with its 1956 purchase of WIND. In 1962, Westinghouse re-entered the New York market when it bought WINS, then a local Top-40 powerhouse, from J. Elroy McCaw. Having reached the FCC's then-limit of seven AM stations, Westinghouse sold KEX to actor and singer Gene Autry, and later decided to shut down WBZA and return its license to the FCC. In 1966, Westinghouse agreed to buy another top-rated music station, KFWB in Los Angeles.

On April 19, 1965, WINS dropped music and instituted a 24-hour, all-news format. KYW went all-news six months later on September 12, three months after Westinghouse regained control of the station (see The 1956 Trade with NBC, below). KFWB would adopt the format on March 11, 1968. The three stations all prospered with their new formats, usually ranking among the five highest-rated stations in their markets. During the 1970s and 1980s, WIND also tinkered with a part-time news format, though it had little success against the dominant all-news station in Chicago, CBS-owned WBBM.

In the 1970s, Westinghouse Radio also developed a prodigious reputation for its innovation in analytical techniques and tools for radio sales and buying. Using sophisticated mathematical modeling, the group promoted its "New Math Calculator" which became extremely popular in ad agencies for planning radio campaigns. This was no simple look-up table; it introduced innovative measures such as "reach index" and "gross cume" to operationalize its core models. Westinghouse later introduced an even more comprehensive tool, stylized as the "Numa Radio Planner". In the days before desktop computers, these "slide rules" were state-of-the-art in audience planning research.

Over the next quarter-century, Westinghouse would purchase several other radio stations, including KFBK in Sacramento, California; WNEW-FM in New York, KTWV in Los Angeles, and WMMR in Philadelphia. WOWO was sold to other interests in 1982 and WIND was spun off in 1985, two years before Group W bought WMAQ from NBC after that network announced it was closing its radio division.

=== Expansion into television ===
Westinghouse entered television on June 9, 1948, with the sign-on of WBZ-TV in Boston; it is the only television station to have been built by the company. Westinghouse's first station purchase was with WPTZ (now KYW-TV) in Philadelphia, in 1953. KPIX in San Francisco was bought in 1954; WDTV (now KDKA-TV) in Pittsburgh was added in 1955; and WAAM (now WJZ-TV) in Baltimore was purchased in 1957. Westinghouse's only other outright television station purchase was in Charlotte, North Carolina, where it purchased WRET-TV from Ted Turner in early 1980, and changed its call letters to WPCQ-TV. Turner used the proceeds from the sale of the Charlotte station to help him launch CNN.

In 1961, the company expanded into television production by launching television and radio distributor WBC Productions. In 1980, the company bought out a majority share of Home Theater Network from Diversified Communications. The company also purchased cable TV system operator TelePrompTer in 1981, which it renamed Group W Cable the following year. Also that year, the company formed Group W Satellite Communications to maintain operations of its satellite business through its TelePrompTer acquisition, as well as that of Home Theater Network. The TelePrompTer acquisition also brought animation producer Filmation into the Group W fold. However, Westinghouse would leave the cable TV system business in 1986, and would later sell the Filmation library to L'Oréal in 1989. During that period, Group W was known in full as Westinghouse Broadcasting and Cable, Inc.

=== The 1956 trade with NBC ===
In June 1955, Westinghouse announced that it would sell its Philadelphia stations, KYW radio and WPTZ, to NBC. In exchange Westinghouse received NBC's Cleveland stations, WTAM radio and WNBK television, along with $3 million in compensation. The deal was approved in January 1956; one month later Westinghouse moved the KYW call letters to Cleveland and NBC renamed the Philadelphia stations WRCV (AM) and WRCV-TV. Both companies also transferred much of their respective management and some on-air personnel to their new cities. Most notably, both The Mike Douglas Show and the Eyewitness News format originated on KYW-TV during its tenure in Cleveland.

However, the ink had barely dried on FCC approval of the trade when the United States Department of Justice opened an investigation into the deal, on claims that NBC had employed extortion and coercion. The Justice Department believed that NBC abused its power as a broadcast network by threatening to withhold or cancel affiliations with Westinghouse-owned stations unless the latter company agreed to the network's terms and participate in the trade. Specifically, it was determined that NBC threatened to drop its programming from both WPTZ and Boston's WBZ-TV; to withhold a primary affiliation from newly acquired KDKA-TV in Pittsburgh (that station would sign with CBS as a primary affiliate); and to withhold or pull an NBC affiliation from any other major-market station Westinghouse would purchase in the future. Based on these findings, a civil antitrust suit was filed against NBC and its parent company RCA, on behalf of Westinghouse in December 1956. During this ordeal NBC attempted to circumvent the investigation by trading the Philadelphia stations in return for RKO General's radio and television properties in Boston, which would have resulted in WBZ-TV losing its NBC affiliation to rival station WNAC-TV; the proposed NBC-RKO station swap never materialized.

In August 1964, after a nearly eight-year-long investigation, the FCC ordered a reversal of the swap. NBC appealed the ruling, extending the ordeal by another year, but the ruling was upheld on appeal. Westinghouse was also allowed to keep the cash compensation from the original deal. When Westinghouse regained control of the Philadelphia stations on June 19, 1965, it restored the KYW calls to the radio station and renamed the television station KYW-TV. And in a reversal of nine years prior, both NBC and Westinghouse relocated various personnel between both cities.

=== Later years in television ===
Throughout its history as an operator of television stations, Westinghouse Broadcasting had relationships with all three major networks. KYW-TV (in both Cleveland and Philadelphia), WBZ-TV, and WPCQ-TV were NBC affiliates, KPIX and KDKA-TV were aligned with CBS, and WJZ-TV was an ABC station. All of Group W's stations were located within the top 40 television markets.

Westinghouse's television stations were all known for their very deep connection to their home markets. They often pre-empted network programming in favor of local programs, and all of them carried programming produced by Group W, which was a major force in television syndication (see Syndication programs, below). However, for the most part the networks did not seem to mind. Most of them were among their networks' strongest performers. KDKA-TV and WJZ-TV dominated their markets, while WBZ-TV and KPIX were solid runners-up.

The only exceptions were KYW-TV and WPCQ. KYW-TV had been one of Westinghouse's (and NBC's) crown jewels for many years, but faltered in the late 1970s and eventually became NBC's weakest major-market affiliate by the mid-1980s. Westinghouse found no success in the Charlotte market, as WPCQ-by far the smallest station ever owned by the company-remained an also-ran during its Group W years. Despite the record purchase price, Group W ran the station on a shoestring budget. Under Group W, WPCQ had a marginal signal, a minimal local news presence and a program schedule more typical of an independent station, with a large number of cartoons and second-hand syndicated programming. WPCQ was also a UHF network affiliate competing against two long-established network stations on VHF. It also had to deal with three longer-established NBC affiliates, on VHF channels from nearby cities, that were also available over-the-air in large parts of the Charlotte market. Westinghouse was able to escape Charlotte when it sold WPCQ (now WCNC-TV) to Odyssey Television Partners (later to become Renaissance Broadcasting) in 1985. The subpar performance of KYW-TV and WPCQ was particularly embarrassing for NBC, as it came during a very prosperous period for the network as a whole.

Aside from WPCQ, Group W almost expanded into the country's top two markets; it emerged as a leading bidder for RKO General's independent stations WOR-TV (currently WWOR-TV) in Secaucus, New Jersey (serving New York City), and came to a deal to buy KHJ-TV (currently KCAL-TV) in Los Angeles. However, protracted legal issues that had dogged RKO General for years delayed the transfer of KHJ-TV, and Westinghouse ultimately withdrew its offer. They were also outbid for WOR-TV by a consortium of Cox Enterprises and MCA/Universal (though the former company dropped out over questions of who would be running the station). In 1987, Westinghouse attempted a bid for the station group handled by investment firm Kohlberg Kravis Roberts, with six stations formerly held by Storer Broadcasting, but the deal ultimately fell through.

=== Merger with CBS ===
Westinghouse Broadcasting International logo

Within a year-long span during 1994–95, a series of surprising events occurred which not only changed the look of the television industry but also ended Westinghouse's uniqueness among television station operators.

In 1994, the Fox Broadcasting Company agreed to a multi-year, multi-station affiliation deal with New World Communications, resulting in most of New World's stations switching to Fox. Among these stations were longtime CBS affiliates WJBK-TV in Detroit and WJW-TV in Cleveland.

To avoid being consigned to the UHF band in two major markets, CBS heavily courted ABC affiliates WXYZ-TV in Detroit and WEWS-TV in Cleveland. Both stations were owned by the E. W. Scripps Company, who used this leverage to strike a similar multi-station affiliation deal of its own with ABC. Unwilling to risk losing two of its strongest and longest-standing affiliates, ABC and Scripps agreed to a 10-year affiliation contract with WEWS, WXYZ and three other stations.

One of these additional stations was Baltimore's then-NBC affiliate, WMAR-TV, which would displace that city's longtime ABC affiliate, Group W-owned WJZ-TV. ABC was initially skeptical of including WMAR in the deal; WJZ-TV had been one of ABC's strongest affiliates, and had been the dominant station in Baltimore for a quarter-century. In contrast, WMAR had been a ratings also-ran for over 30 years. However, Scripps demanded that WMAR be included if the deal was to go through. Well aware that there were few viable choices for replacement affiliates in Detroit or Cleveland, ABC gave in.

The loss of WJZ-TV's ABC affiliation did not sit well with Westinghouse. At the time, WJZ-TV had been affiliated with ABC for 46 years, longer than any station that wasn't owned by the network. Westinghouse sought an affiliation deal of its own, and after several months of negotiations with the other networks, Westinghouse agreed to affiliate its entire television unit with CBS. Under the terms of the deal, all five Group W stations would carry the entire CBS schedule with no pre-emptions except for local news emergencies (as noted above, prior to this, Group W stations were known for pre-empting selected programming of their affiliated networks with Group W-mandated content).

The deal resulted in a three-way transaction between Group W, CBS, and NBC, which unfolded between the summer of 1994 and the summer of 1995. The terms were as follows:

- In September 1994, KPIX and KDKA-TV ended their long-standing policies of pre-empting some CBS shows, and began carrying the entire CBS schedule with no pre-emptions. (KPIX however at the time aired CBS prime time programming an hour earlier than normal, a practice that continued until 1998.)
- On January 2, 1995, WJZ-TV and WBZ-TV switched from ABC and NBC, respectively, to CBS, while WBAL-TV and WHDH-TV affiliated with NBC; WMAR-TV took on WJZ-TV's ABC affiliation.
- On September 10, 1995, at 1:00 am. EDT, KYW-TV switched from NBC to CBS. CBS traded its previous Philadelphia station, WCAU-TV, to NBC in return for KCNC-TV in Denver and KUTV in Salt Lake City, while KUSA and KSL-TV affiliated with NBC and KMGH-TV affiliated with ABC. CBS then traded controlling interest in KCNC and KUTV to Westinghouse in return for a minority stake in KYW-TV. (KCNC's station history page erroneously implies that this trade was between NBC and Westinghouse.) The swap in Philadelphia was delayed when CBS discovered it would face a massive capital gains tax bill if it sold WCAU to NBC outright.
  - As a result of the trade, CBS-owned WCIX in Miami swapped channels with NBC-owned WTVJ. CBS and NBC traded their Miami broadcasting facilities to compensate each other for the loss of stations. WCIX changed its call letters to WFOR-TV, and CBS sold controlling interest in WFOR to Westinghouse.
- Westinghouse and CBS formed a joint venture that assumed ownership of KYW-TV, KCNC, KUTV and WFOR, with Westinghouse as majority owner. Giving Group W control of the venture allowed CBS to have some interest in its affiliates and avoid violating FCC rules at the time that forbade groups from owning TV stations that covered more than 25% of the country (CBS O&Os reached 21.8% prior to the purchase, and Group W reached 9.7%.)

A short time later, Westinghouse announced it was buying CBS outright, a transaction which closed in late 1995. As a condition of the merger, both CBS and Group W were forced to sell off several radio stations due to the FCC's then-current ownership limits. CBS also had to sell WPRI-TV in Providence, Rhode Island (which was acquired in March 1995 and would swap affiliations with WLNE-TV one hour before KYW-TV assumed the CBS affiliation) due to a significant signal overlap with WBZ-TV, which provides a city-grade signal to much of the Providence market. At the time, the FCC normally did not allow common ownership of stations with overlapping signals, and would not even consider granting a waiver for a city-grade overlap; the FCC began to allow common ownership of stations with overlapping signals without a waiver in 2000.

=== Epilogue and legacy ===
Following the completion of the CBS takeover, the former Westinghouse Broadcasting operations took on the CBS name and identity, though the Group W name survived until the end of the 1990s as a holding company within the merged entity's structure. The Westinghouse-CBS merger resulted in several longtime rivals on the radio dials of New York City, Los Angeles, Chicago, and Philadelphia becoming sister stations.

From that point forward, however, Westinghouse proceeded to transform itself from its legendary role as a diversified conglomerate with a strong industrial heritage into a media giant. Over the next year, it sold off almost all of its non-broadcast properties. In 1997, Westinghouse changed its name to CBS Corporation and moved its headquarters to New York. Westinghouse's cable television network properties—consisting then of The Nashville Network (now the general-interest Paramount Network) and Country Music Television, which CBS/Westinghouse purchased from Gaylord Entertainment in 1996, and equity stakes in regional sports networks Midwest Sports Channel (now split into FanDuel Sports Network North, serving Minnesota and the Dakotas, and FanDuel Sports Network Wisconsin, both of which CBS purchased in conjunction with its 1992 acquisition of Midwest Television and its two stations, WCCO-TV in Minneapolis/St. Paul and WFRV-TV in Green Bay) and Home Team Sports (now Monumental Sports Network) in the Baltimore–Washington area—were consequently reorganized as CBS Cable (a name used prior by CBS Inc. for an arts-oriented basic cable channel it operated from October 1981 to December 1982). In 1998, the company created a new licensing subsidiary under the Westinghouse Electric Corporation name. In this sense, the Westinghouse-CBS merger turned out to be a "wag the dog" transaction.

After selling off its nuclear assets to BNFL in 1999, CBS Corporation was merged into Viacom in 2000, thus ending the corporate legacy of the original Westinghouse for good. TNN and CMT were consolidated into Viacom's MTV Networks basic cable unit post-merger, with HTS being sold to Comcast and Midwest Sports Channel being sold to News Corporation shortly afterward. Viacom, however, changed its name to CBS Corporation at the end of 2005 and spun off most of its cable and movie interests as a new Viacom. With a few exceptions, the "new" CBS Corporation retained the same television properties that the old CBS Corporation held prior to the Viacom merger, including the new Westinghouse. Theater chain National Amusements, which had held controlling interest in the "old" Viacom since 1986, retained controlling interest in both the "new" CBS and Viacom.

Excluding WMAQ (shut down in 2000 to allow all-sports WSCR to move to its old dial position) and KFWB (placed in a holding trust as a consequence of CBS's purchase of KCAL-TV; the trust divested the station in 2016), all of the former Group W radio stations were part of CBS Radio until its merger with Entercom (now Audacy, Inc.) on November 17, 2017. While the merged company took Entercom's name, CBS shareholders held controlling interest in the enlarged Entercom. Following the merger, one of the former Group W stations, WBZ, was spun off to iHeartMedia. CBS had previously announced in 2016 that it had been looking to leave the radio business.

In 2019, Viacom and CBS reunited as ViacomCBS (renamed Paramount Global in 2022), with National Amusements as the majority shareholder. Paramount Global and National Amusements then merged with Skydance Media to form the Paramount Skydance Corporation in 2025.

Currently, only one station continues to use the classic Group W font: radio station WOWO (owned by Pathfinder Communications Corporation). The other stations gradually discontinued using the typeface during the 21st century.

== Former stations ==
- Stations are arranged in alphabetical order by state and city of license.
- Two boldface asterisks appearing following a station's call letters (**) indicate a station built and signed on by either Westinghouse Broadcasting.
- Does not include KCNC-TV in Denver, WFOR-TV in Miami, and KUTV in Salt Lake City.

Stations owned by Westinghouse Broadcasting
Media market	State	Station	Purchased	Sold	Notes
Phoenix	Arizona	KMEO	1985	1991	
Phoenix	Arizona	KMEO-FM	1985	1991	
Los Angeles	California	KFWB	1966	1995	
Los Angeles	California	KTWV	1989	1995	
Sacramento	California	KFBK	1986	1994	
Sacramento	California	KGBY	1986	1994	(Note: Known as KAER prior to 1991.)
San Francisco–Oakland	California	KPIX	1994	1995	
San Francisco–Oakland	California	KPIX-FM	1994	1995	
San Francisco–Oakland	California	KPIX-TV	1954	1995	
San Diego	California	KJQY	1980	1989	
Denver	Colorado	KEZW	1986	1988	
Denver	Colorado	KOSI-FM	1981	1988	
Washington, D.C.	District of Columbia	WCPT	1989	1993	
Washington, D.C.	District of Columbia	WCXR-FM	1989	1993	
Chicago	Illinois	KYW **	1921	1934	(Note: Pre-NARBA station.) (Note: Relocated to Philadelphia in 1934.)
Chicago	Illinois	WIND	1956	1985	
Chicago	Illinois	WMAQ	1988	1995	
Fort Wayne	Indiana	WOWO	1936	1982	
Fort Wayne	Indiana	WGL	1936	1944	
Baltimore	Maryland	WJZ-TV	1957	1995	
Boston	Massachusetts	WBZ **	1924	1995	(Note: Established in Springfield, Massachusetts, in 1921; moved to Boston in 1931 in a license swap with synchronous repeater WBZA.)
Boston	Massachusetts	WBZ-FM **	1946	1954	(Note: Ceased operations in 1954.)
Boston	Massachusetts	WBZ-FM **	1957	1981	
Boston	Massachusetts	WBZ-TV**	1948	1995	
Springfield	Massachusetts	WBZA **	1921	1962	(Note: Established in Boston in 1924 as a synchronous repeater of WBZ; moved to Springfield in 1931 in a license swap. Ceased operations in 1962.)
Springfield	Massachusetts	WBZA-FM **	1946	1954	(Note: Ceased operations in 1954.)
Detroit	Michigan	WLLZ-FM	1989	1995	
Hastings	Nebraska	KFKX	1923	1928	(Note: Moved to Chicago and merged with KYW.)
Newark	New Jersey	WJZ **	1921	1923	
New York City	New York	WINS	1962	1995	
New York City	New York	WNEW-FM	1989	1995	
Charlotte	North Carolina	WPCQ-TV	1980	1985	
Cleveland	Ohio	KDPM	1923	1926	
Cleveland	Ohio	KYW	1956	1965	(Note: Involved in a 1956 asset swap between Westinghouse Broadcasting and NBC which was voided outright in 1965.)
Cleveland	Ohio	KYW-FM	1956	1965	
Cleveland	Ohio	KYW-TV	1956	1965	
Portland	Oregon	KEX	1944	1962	
Portland	Oregon	KEX-FM **	1948	1961	(Note: Ceased operations in 1961.)
Philadelphia	Pennsylvania	WMMR	1989	1995	
Philadelphia	Pennsylvania	WPTZ	1953	1956	
Philadelphia	Pennsylvania	KYW	1934	1956	
Philadelphia	Pennsylvania	KYW	1965	1995	
Philadelphia	Pennsylvania	KYW-FM **	1946	1955	(Note: Ceased operations in 1955.)
Philadelphia	Pennsylvania	KYW-TV	1965	1995	
Pittsburgh	Pennsylvania	KDKA **	1920	1995	
Pittsburgh	Pennsylvania	KDKA-FM **	1946	1984	(Note: Known as WPNT from 1979 onward.)
Pittsburgh	Pennsylvania	KDKA-TV	1955	1995	
Dallas–Fort Worth	Texas	KQZY	1980	1991	(Note: Known as KOAX prior to 1985 and as KRSR from 1990 onward.)
Houston	Texas	KODA	1979	1989	
Houston	Texas	KILT	1989	1995	
Houston	Texas	KILT-FM	1989	1995	
Houston	Texas	KIKK	1993	1995	
Houston	Texas	KIKK-FM	1993	1995	
San Antonio	Texas	KQXT-FM	1984	1992	

== Syndicated programs ==
Some of their best-known programs were syndicated and seen in primetime and early/late fringe through its syndication division, Group W Productions, which was originally known as WBC Productions until 1968. It was originally founded in 1961 to sell syndication of radio and television programming. Many of these programs were also sold internationally (under the name of Westinghouse Broadcasting International). In 1992, the Westinghouse Broadcasting International unit has signed a deal with Mitsubishi to represent the catalog for the Japanese market.

=== Late night talk/variety shows ===
- PM East (with Mike Wallace and Joyce Davidson)/PM West (with Terrence O'Flaherty) (1961–1962)
- The Steve Allen Show (1962–1964)
- That Regis Philbin Show! (1964–1965)
- The Merv Griffin Show (1965–1969)
- The David Frost Show (1969–1972)
- The Howard Stern Radio Show (1998–2001) (as Eyemark Entertainment)

=== Daytime shows ===
- The Mike Douglas Show (1963–1980)
- The John Davidson Show (1980–1982)
- Hour Magazine, hosted by Gary Collins (1980–1989)
- The Wil Shriner Show (1986–1987)
- Couch Potatoes, game show hosted by Marc Summers (1989; co-production with Saban Entertainment)
- Every Second Counts, game show hosted by Bill Rafferty, produced by Charles Colarusso Productions (1984)
- House Party; talk show hosted by Steve Doocy (1990; co-production with NBC Productions)
- The Chuck Woolery Show (September 16 – December 13, 1991)
- Scrabble, unsold syndicated run pilot with Steve Edwards as host (1990; co-production with Reg Grundy Productions)
- That's Amore, game show hosted by Luca Barbareschi (1992–1993, co-production with Four Point Entertainment and RTI Mediaset)
- Vicki!, talk show hosted by Vicki Lawrence (1992–1994)
- Marilu, talk show hosted by Marilu Henner (1994–1995)
- Morning Stretch, exercise and fitness program hosted by Joanie Greggains (produced at KPIX during the 1980s)
- Day and Date, hosted by Dana King and Patrick Vanhorn (also produced at KPIX, 1995–1997; initially went under Group W name before switch to Eyemark name mid-season)

Group W and KPIX also created, in 1975 (with its premiere in 1976), America's first non-news magazine series, Evening Magazine with host Jan Yanehiro. After the first few years, it franchised to Group W stations and eventually to other markets through local stations, using the name PM Magazine on non-Group W stations airing the show.

=== Made-for-TV movies ===
- Mafia Princess, starring Tony Curtis and Susan Lucci (1986)

=== Children's/animated series ===
- Dino Babies (1994–1996)
- Teenage Mutant Ninja Turtles (1987 version)
- The New Adventures of Speed Racer (1993 version)
- Way Cool (1991–1992) ()
- The in-house Filmation library (He-Man and the Masters of the Universe, The Archie Show, She-Ra: Princess of Power, Fat Albert and the Cosby Kids, Ghostbusters, BraveStarr, Mission: Magic!, among other titles)

=== First-run syndicated shows ===
- Fight Back! with David Horowitz (1976–1992)
- Bob Vila's Home Again (1990–2005)
- The George Michael Sports Machine (1995–2001)
- Martha Stewart Living (1993–2004)
- "Hour Magazine" with Gary Collins and Pat Mitchell co-hosting (1981–1991)

=== End of Group W Productions ===
After the merger with CBS in 1996, Westinghouse acquired Ed Wilson and Bob Cook's MaXam Entertainment (which was founded in 1994 and partially owned by A.H. Belo Corporation) and merged it with Group W Productions and CBS Enterprises (including CBS Broadcast International) to form Eyemark Entertainment, with CBS Broadcast International acquiring the overseas rights to the Group W backlog. Eyemark was in turn folded into King World Productions following King World's acquisition by CBS in 2000. King World gained control of most of the Group W and Eyemark libraries from 2000 to 2005. These libraries are now controlled by CBS Media Ventures. The Filmation library and The George Michael Sports Machine are owned by NBCUniversal (the former through DreamWorks Animation/Classic Media), Bob Vila's Home Again is owned by Bob Vila with Telco Productions handling distribution rights, and the 1987 Teenage Mutant Ninja Turtles series is now owned by Nickelodeon via Viacom International Inc., with Paramount Home Entertainment handling home media rights.

== Cable networks ==
- The Nashville Network (then co-owned with Gaylord Entertainment; Group W later bought Gaylord's stake in the channel; later owned by Viacom's MTV Networks as Spike (currently Paramount Network as of 2018))
- The Disney Channel (then co-owned with The Walt Disney Company; Disney later bought Group W's 50 percent stake prior to its launch)
- Home Team Sports (Baltimore\Washington network) and Home Sports Entertainment (Dallas)
- Home Theater Network (1978–1987)
- Satellite News Channel (co-owned with ABC; network went defunct after a year)
- Showtime (50 percent stake with Viacom from 1981 (when Group W acquired TelePrompTer), until they sold their half of Showtime back to Viacom in 1982)
- Wisconsin Sports Network (co-owned with the Milwaukee Time Warner Cable franchise from 1996 to 1998, then merged into CBS Cable's Midwest Sports Channel (MSC). Later bought by Fox in 2000 and became FSN North and FSN Wisconsin (No relation to the present-day website of the same name.)
- Z Channel (under TelePrompTer-owned Theta Cable)
