= Right of Way (film) =

1983 television drama film

- Based on: Right of Way by Richard Lees
- Written by: Richard Lees
- Directed by: George Schaefer
- Starring: Bette Davis; James Stewart; Melinda Dillon
- Music by: Brad Fiedel
- Country of origin: United States
- Original language: English

Production
- Executive producer: Merrill H. Karpf
- Producer: George Schaefer
- Production locations: Carmel-by-the-Sea, California; Los Angeles; Santa Monica, California
- Cinematography: Howard Schwartz
- Editor: Sidney Katz
- Running time: 96 minutes
- Production company: HBO Premiere Films

Original release
- Network: HBO
- Release: November 21, 1983

Right of Way is a 1983 American made-for-television drama film written by Richard Lees and starring Bette Davis and James Stewart, and directed by George Schaefer. The film was originally broadcast on HBO on November 21, 1983. It was based on a play by Richard Lees of the same name.

The film stars film veterans Davis and Stewart as an elderly long-married couple who must decide how to deal with the situation of one of them being diagnosed with a terminal illness. Melinda Dillon and Priscilla Morrill also star.

Right of Way was one of 20 films selected for the seventh Montreal World Film Festival.
