= The Star (1952 film) =

1952 film by Stuart Heisler

- Theatrical release poster
- Directed by: Stuart Heisler
- Screenplay by: Dale Eunson; Katherine Albert
- Produced by: Bert E. Friedlob
- Starring: Bette Davis; Sterling Hayden; Natalie Wood
- Cinematography: Ernest Laszlo
- Edited by: Otto Ludwig
- Music by: Victor Young
- Production company: Bert E. Friedlob Productions
- Distributed by: 20th Century Fox
- Release date: December 11, 1952
- Running time: 90 minutes
- Country: United States
- Language: English
- Box office: $1 million (US)

The Star is a 1952 American drama film, directed by Stuart Heisler and starring Bette Davis, Sterling Hayden, and Natalie Wood. The plot tells the story of an aging, washed-up actress who is desperate to restart her career. Even though the film was a critical and commercial failure, Bette Davis received an Academy Award nomination for Best Actress.

== Plot ==
Oscar-winning actress Margaret "Maggie" Elliot is a financially struggling actress who finds it difficult to accept her changed circumstances. Convinced that she can somehow restore her former success, she continues searching for a major acting role. After another disappointment, she gets drunk, is arrested for driving under the influence, and spends the night in jail. Jim Johannsen, a younger former actor whom she had helped in the past, bails her out. Now the financially secure owner of a boatyard, Jim admits that he has loved her ever since they first met. With the help of Margaret's daughter, Gretchen, he tries to persuade Margaret to accept that her career as a famous actress has ended. Margaret reluctantly takes a job as a saleswoman at a upscale department store, but remarks made by two customers hurt her pride, and she leaves the store. Her former agent then arranges a screen test for a role in a film she has long wanted to appear in. She auditions for a supporting role, hoping to portray the character as a younger, attractive woman rather than the middle-aged women the studio believes her to be, in the hope of securing the more desirable lead role. However, her attempt is unsuccessful.

At a Hollywood party hosted by her agent, Margaret is offered a role in a new film about a former star who refuses to accept that her career has ended. The film portrays aging actors and actresses who cling to their former fame and beauty and struggle to accept that their time in the spotlight has passed. When Margaret hears the premise and learns that she is considered ideal for the role, she recognizes the similarities between the character and her own circumstances. Realizing that her career is over, and she leaves the party and seeks comfort in Jim and her daughter, from whom she had tried to conceal the decline of her career.

== Cast ==
- Bette Davis as Margaret Elliot
- Sterling Hayden as Jim Johannsen
- Natalie Wood as Gretchen
- Warner Anderson as Harry Stone
- Minor Watson as Joe Morrison
- June Travis as Phyllis Stone
- Paul Frees as Richard Stanley
- Robert Warwick as R.J., aging actor at party
- Barbara Lawrence as herself
- Fay Baker as Margaret's sister, Faith
- Herb Vigran as Margaret's brother-in-law, Roy

== Production ==
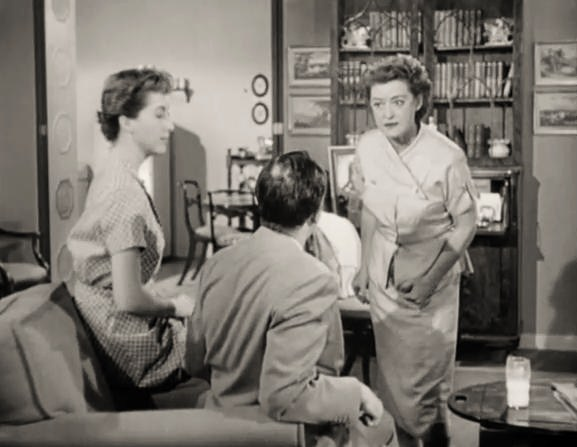
Fay Baker, Herb Vigran and Bette Davis

Katherine Albert and her husband Dale Eunson reportedly based the Margaret Elliot character on Joan Crawford, whose long friendship with the couple was ending as production began. Although it is sometimes said that Crawford turned down the role, it never was offered to her. Bette Davis publicly disdained Crawford and thus eagerly took it.

== Reception ==
On the review aggregator website Rotten Tomatoes, 25% of 8 critics' reviews are positive. Metacritic, which uses a weighted average, assigned the film a score of 54 out of 100, based on 6 critics, indicating "mixed or average" reviews.

== See also ==
- 1952 in film
- List of American films of 1952
