= White Mama =

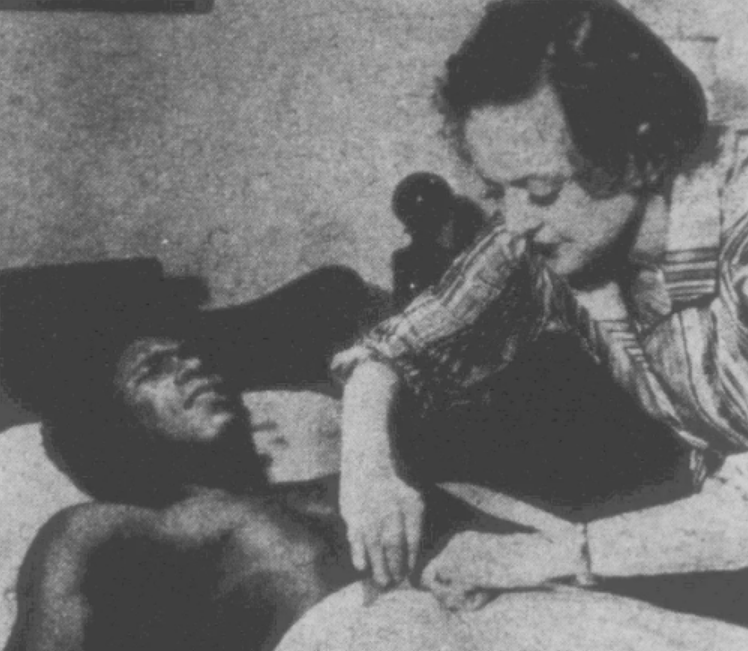
- Genre: Drama
- Written by: Robert C.S. Downs
- Directed by: Jackie Cooper
- Starring: Bette Davis; Ernest Harden Jr. Eileen Heckart
- Music by: Peter Matz
- Country of origin: United States
- Original language: English

Production
- Executive producer: Thomas W. Moore
- Producer: Jean Moore Edwards
- Production locations: East Los Angeles; Skid Row, Central City East, Los Angeles
- Cinematography: William K. Jurgensen
- Editor: Jerry Dronsky
- Running time: 96 minutes
- Production company: Tomorrow Entertainment

Original release
- Network: CBS
- Release: March 5, 1980

White Mama is a 1980 American made-for-television drama film directed by Jackie Cooper and starring Bette Davis in the title role. It was adapted from the novel of the same name by Robert C.S. Downs. It was broadcast as The CBS Wednesday Night Movie on March 5, 1980.

For her performance, Davis was nominated for an Emmy Award for Outstanding Lead Actress in a Miniseries or Movie.

== Synopsis ==
Davis portrays Adele Malone, an impoverished white widow who takes in a black juvenile offender named B.T. for the support money it will bring. During the course of their stormy relationship, Adele teaches B.T. about responsibility, dignity and pride, and he teaches her street savvy, survival and grit. Together they find a mutual trust and respect that are dramatically tested when Adele is evicted from her apartment and forced to join the legions of homeless bag ladies. In the subsequent dramatic change of events, B.T. enters a brutal boxing match where he must fight an awesome opponent in order to help his caring friend to financially survive.

== Cast ==
- Bette Davis as Adele Malone
- Ernest Harden Jr. as B.T. Williamson
- Eileen Heckart as Three Bag Lady
- Virginia Capers as Gorilla Sydney
- Anne Ramsey as Heavy Charm
- Lurene Tuttle as Mrs. McIntyre
- Tony Burton as Black Fighter
- Peg Shirley as Judge Alice Quentin
- Ernie Hudson as Counselor
- Dan Mason as Father Gannon
- Vincent Schiavelli as Medic
