= A Piano for Mrs. Cimino =

1982 American drama film

- Genre: Drama
- Written by: John Gay; Robert Oliphant
- Directed by: George Schaefer
- Starring: Bette Davis
- Music by: James Horner
- Country of origin: United States
- Original language: English

Production
- Executive producers: Tony Converse; Roger Gimbel
- Producers: George Schaefer; Christopher Seitz
- Production locations: Santa Monica, California; Canada
- Cinematography: Edward R. Brown
- Editor: Rita Roland
- Running time: 100 minutes
- Production companies: EMI Television; Roger Gimbel Productions
- Budget: $1.75 million

Original release
- Network: CBS
- Release: February 3, 1982

A Piano for Mrs. Cimino is a 1982 American made-for-television drama film produced and directed by George Schaefer. The teleplay by John Gay is based on the novel of the same name by Robert Oliphant. It was broadcast on February 3 by CBS.

== Plot ==
The story focuses on Esther Cimino, an aging piano teacher who is misdiagnosed as having dementia shortly after her husband passes away. Her son George has her declared incompetent and puts her affairs in the hands of a questionable trustee. Her granddaughter Karen places the woman in a convalescent home overseen by a caring director, and under his patient care Mrs. Cimino blossoms, only to learn her business, home, and all her possessions, including her beloved piano, were sold during her confinement.

With her dignity and health restored, Mrs. Cimino tries to regain control of her life by establishing her independence and retaining control over her remaining assets. Assisting her in her battles is her long lost friend Barney Fellman, who brings her the unexpected promise of romance in her later years.

== Cast ==
- Bette Davis as Esther Cimino
- Keenan Wynn as Barney Fellman
- Alexa Kenin as Karen Cimino
- George Hearn as George Cimino
- Penny Fuller as Mrs. Polanski
- Christopher Guest as Philip Ryan
- Graham Jarvis as Leach
- Eda Reiss Merin as Mrs. Gatlin
- Karen Austin as Alice Cimino
