= Strangers: The Story of a Mother and Daughter =

1979 television film directed by Milton Katselas

- Genre: Drama
- Written by: Michael de Guzman
- Directed by: Milton Katselas
- Starring: Bette Davis; Gena Rowlands; Ford Rainey; Donald Moffat
- Music by: Fred Karlin
- Country of origin: United States
- Original language: English

Production
- Producers: Robert W. Christiansen; Rick Rosenberg
- Production location: Mendocino, California
- Cinematography: James Crabe
- Editor: Millie Moore
- Running time: 90 minutes
- Production company: Chris-Rose Productions

Original release
- Network: CBS
- Release: May 13, 1979

Strangers: The Story of a Mother and Daughter is a 1979 American made-for-television drama film directed by Milton Katselas and starring Bette Davis and Gena Rowlands. It was broadcast May 13, 1979 on CBS.

Davis won an Emmy Award for Outstanding Lead Actress in a Miniseries or Movie for her performance.

== Plot ==
Bette Davis stars as Lucy Mason, an embittered New England widow who, after an estrangement of 20 years, is reunited with her daughter Abigail (Gena Rowlands). The two women attempt to repair their relationship when the daughter is diagnosed with cancer.

Ford Rainey, Donald Moffat, Whit Bissell and Royal Dano also appear.

== Cast ==
- Bette Davis as Lucy Mason
- Gena Rowlands as Abigail Mason
- Ford Rainey as Mr. Meecham
- Donald Moffat as Wally Ball
- Whit Bissell as Dr. Henry Blodgett
- Royal Dano as Mr. Willis
- Kate Riehl as Mrs. Brighton
