= Tabloid (TV program) =

Canadian information television program

- Tabloid title card
- Presented by: Joyce Davidson (1956–1959); Max Ferguson (1958–1960); Elaine Grand (1953–1956); Dick MacDougal (1953–1958); Percy Saltzman (1953–1960)
- Country of origin: Canada
- Original language: English
- No. of seasons: 8

Production
- Producers: Ross McLean (1953–1958); Ted Pope (1958–1960)
- Running time: 30 minutes

Original release
- Network: CBC Television
- Release: 9 March 1953 – 9 September 1960

Related
- Seven-O-One

Tabloid is Canadian information television program that aired on CBC Television. It was one of the earliest information television programs aired in Canada The program was broadcast weeknights from March 1953 to September 1960 after which it was renamed to Seven-O-One.

== Format ==
The program featured interviews, news and information. Its opening tagline was "a program with an interest in anything that happens anywhere, bringing you the news at seven." It was also promoted as "the nightly habit of nearly everyone".

Gunnar Rugheimer compiled a newsreel for the program which featured stories from various international sources such as BBC, Movietone, United Press International, and the Canadian Forces. Discussions, interviews, demonstrations, reviews and weather reports from Percy Saltzman rounded out the Tabloid episodes, resembling a "spoken-word variety show".

Producer Ross McLean's catchphrase for Tabloid was "Facts with Fun", reflecting his approach that news and information programming should incorporate elements of entertainment. He acknowledged that the early episodes of Tabloid were "a bargain basement version of NBC's Today." The interviews, features and weather forecast were supplemented with informal conversations among the hosts.

== Hosts ==
Dick MacDougal, a radio presenter, was a host of Tabloid from its first episodes in 1953 until his death in 1957. He was replaced by another radio host, Max Ferguson who remained until Tabloid became Seven-O-One in 1960.

Percy Saltzman was the only Tabloid host who remained through the program's entire run, and the extent of its successor, Seven-O-One. He presented the weather forecasts as he did in the earlier CBC program Let's See. Viewers regularly saw Saltzman's signature tossing of his chalk after he was requested by producer McLean to make this a regular practice.

Elaine Grand joined the show in early 1953 to conduct freelance interviews. She became a full-time host by February 1954, leaving the show in 1956 to work with Associated-Rediffusion in the United Kingdom. Paisley Maxwell succeeded her as an interim host until Joyce Davidson replaced Grand on a full-time basis from 1956 to 1959.

News reports were provided by Gil Christy (1953–1954), then John O'Leary for the remainder of Tabloid's existence. Dave Price presented the sportscast.

Other people seen on Tabloid include Allan Anderson, Gregory Clark, Earl Cox, Blair Fraser, Trent Frayne, Robert Fulford, Sydney Katz, Robert McKeown, Wilfred Sanders, John Saywell, Lister Sinclair, Jean Templeton and Bruce West.

Approximately 6500 guests were featured on Tabloid as of June 1960. These included Billy Graham, Duncan Hines, Margaret Mead, Nicholas Monsarrat, and Amy Vanderbilt.

== Production ==
The program was produced in Toronto at CBLT studios by Ross McLean.

Ted Pope became producer in September 1958 when McLean concentrated on production of another CBC program, Close-Up.

== Scheduling ==
Tabloid was broadcast weekdays at 7 p.m. (Eastern) for most of its run, except from September 1954 to July 1955 when it was scheduled at 6:30 p.m..

== Ratings ==
In the 1957–1958 season, CBC Audience Research ratings indicated that Tabloid had a 15% to 18% share of viewers in Toronto, versus the 35% to 45% share of viewers for Annie Oakley on Buffalo, New York's WBEN. Montreal's Tabloid ratings share was 11%, while Radio-Canada's French-language Telejournal and Carrefour drew a 67% share.

A later CBC Times report indicated a rated Tabloid audience of 250,000 from Toronto's CBLT.

== Controversies ==
In 1956, Montreal doctor E. E. Robbins wrote a critical letter to Tabloid. It was read on the show, accompanied by Robbins' home address and MacDougal requesting viewers to "cheer him up". Robbins sued CBC after he was deluged with disruptive letters and telephone calls and prank taxi calls. The case ended with Robbins winning a $3000 settlement against CBC from the Quebec Superior Court.

Host Joyce Davidson expressed indifference towards a Canadian visit by Queen Elizabeth II during an interview on a June 1959 broadcast of NBC's Today. Following intense critical reaction to these remarks, Davidson resigned from Tabloid within a few days.

The programme was retitled Seven-O-One in 1960 after a drug manufacturer which held a trademark to its "Tabloid" product pressured the CBC to change the news show's name. The last episode under the Tabloid name aired 9 September 1960.
