= This 'n That =

1987 memoir by Bette Davis

- Author: Bette Davis with Michael Herskowitz
- Language: English
- Genre: Memoir
- Published: November 1987
- Publisher: Berkley Pub Group
- Publication place: United States
- Media type: Hardcover; paperback
- Pages: 207
- ISBN: 978-0425106242

This 'n That is a memoir written by actress Bette Davis with Michael Herskowitz, first published in 1987.

== Overview ==
As Davis had already written an autobiography, The Lonely Life, published in 1962, she had discussed in some detail the most important years of her acting career. This 'N That did not repeat those details, and therefore contained very little information about the period before 1962, and concentrated on Davis's acting career of the 1970s and 1980s. Much of her writing concerned her recent illness and recovery from a major stroke.

== Background ==
This 'n That was published after her daughter B. D. Hyman's memoir My Mother's Keeper (1985), in which Hyman depicted Davis as an alcoholic, overbearing shrew. Davis referred to Hyman in her book with pride and affection throughout, with the bulk of it having been written prior to the publication of Hyman's memoir; however, a final chapter was in the form of a letter addressed "Dear Hyman," in which Davis expressed her sense of betrayal. Davis and Hyman reportedly remained estranged until Davis' death in 1989. The tensions between the two women were widely reported during the marketing of both books.

Co-author "Michael Herskowitz" is also known as "Mickey Herskowitz," who was also a former ghost writer for George W. Bush. He has written more than 30 books and has worked on autobiographies with several athletes. He also was a sportswriter and columnist for the Houston Post and the Houston Chronicle. According to Herskowitz, Bette Davis requested he use the name "Michael" rather than "Mickey."

== Editions ==
- This 'n That, Bette Davis and Michael Herskowitz, Putnam Publishing Group, March 1987, ISBN 0-399-13246-5, hardcover, 207 pages.
- This 'n That, Bette Davis and Michael Herskowitz, Berkley Publishing Group, March 1988, ISBN 0-425-10624-1, paperback
