= Mommie Dearest =

1978 memoir and expose by Christina Crawford

- First edition cover
- Author: Christina Crawford
- Language: English
- Genre: Memoir
- Publisher: William Morrow & Co.
- Publication date: 1978
- Publication place: United States
- Media type: Print (hardcover)
- Pages: 286 pp
- ISBN: 0-688-03386-5
- OCLC: 4114625
- Dewey Decimal: 791.43/028/0924 B
- LC Class: PN2287.C67C7

Mommie Dearest is a memoir and exposé written by Christina Crawford, the adopted daughter of Academy Award winning actress Joan Crawford. Officially released by William Morrow and Company on November 10, 1978 (though thousands of copies had already been placed in bookstores in October), the book attracted much controversy for its portrayal of Joan Crawford as a cruel, unbalanced, and alcoholic mother, with Crawford's other twin daughters, household staff, and family friends denouncing it as sensationalized fiction. It was turned into a 1981 film of the same title starring Faye Dunaway.

== Synopsis ==
In the book, Christina alleges that Joan Crawford placed far more importance on her cinematic career than her family life and would frequently abuse her children. Joan was an alcoholic in the 1960s and Christina also claimed that Joan had sexual affairs with various men, whom Christina was required to call "Uncle."

Christina's narrative claims that Joan's controlling behavior continued throughout Christina's adulthood, asserting that Joan was jealous of Christina's acting career in the 1960s, to the point of taking over Christina's role in the soap opera The Secret Storm while Christina was in the hospital recovering from an operation to remove an ovarian cyst.

The book culminates with Christina learning that she and her brother, Christopher, were intentionally disinherited upon the death of their mother for "reasons which are well known to them."

== Reactions ==
The book's publication in 1978 created an enormous amount of attention. Some of Crawford's friends disputed the version of events presented in Mommie Dearest. Among them were Van Johnson, Katharine Hepburn, Cesar Romero, Bob Hope, Barbara Stanwyck, Sydney Guilaroff, Ann Blyth, Gary Gray, and Myrna Loy.

Douglas Fairbanks Jr., Crawford's first husband, stated, "The Joan Crawford that I've heard about in Mommie Dearest is not the Joan Crawford I knew back then." Crawford's other daughters, Cindy and Cathy, have stated many times that they did not witness or experience any of the events described in the book. Christopher Crawford supported Christina's account, describing an incident where Crawford made him hold his hand in a fireplace until it blistered, and stating, "I honestly to this day do not believe that she ever cared for me"

Bette Davis, Crawford's longtime rival, denounced the book, stating, "I was not Miss Crawford's biggest fan, but, wisecracks to the contrary, I did and still do respect her talent. What she did not deserve was that detestable book written by her daughter. I've forgotten her name. Horrible." In 1985, Davis's daughter B. D. Hyman published a book titled My Mother's Keeper, which portrays Davis as an alcoholic, emotionally manipulative mother, similar to the way Crawford is portrayed in Mommie Dearest.

Liz Smith, writing in The Baltimore Sun and other newspapers that carried her syndicated column, said, "I was inclined to believe Joan was misguided in her attempts to 'mold' her children—and was vain and self-absorbed like most great stars—but the stories of beatings and near-madness were over the top."

Joan Crawford's secretary for nearly 50 years, Betty Barker, also stated that while Joan was strict, Christina and Christopher were never abused.

On May 28, 1981, Christina's sister, Cathy Crawford LaLonde, appeared on Good Morning America to deny the allegations made by Christina. She said, "My mother was a very warm person. She was always there when we needed her. She was a working mother, but she always had time for us, and as far as Mommie Dearest, it's a great work of fiction. Christina must have been in another household."

In October 1981, People magazine published an article titled "Was She Devil or Doting Mom?: 'Dearest' Stirs A Row Among Joan Crawford's Adopted Kids". During the interview, Cathy Crawford LaLonde, stated "Christina says Joan was rotten, and I say she was a good person," further going on to say, "I just can't feel for anybody who would do that to their own mother. It's very immoral."

Crawford's other daughter, Cindy Crawford Jordan, told reporters in 1979, "I can't understand how people believe this stupid stuff Tina has written."

In her 1987 autobiography, Myrna Loy stated "She [Christina] wanted to be Joan Crawford. I think that's the basis of the book she wrote afterward and everything else. I saw what Christina's mind created, the fantasy world she lived in."

Christina's former husband, producer Harvey Medlinsky, said in response to Christina's memoir, "I have only good things to say about Joan Crawford. She was always nice to me and Christina while we were married."

The Secret Storm producer Gloria Monty, countered Christina's allegation that Joan "stole" Christina's role on the television show when she fell ill in 1968. According to Monty, Christina lied regarding this situation. Monty stated that she and CBS asked Joan to substitute for her daughter on the show, and that Joan agreed only in the interest of not allowing Christina to be permanently replaced by another actress until she could return to the show. Monty added, "I'll tell you that I saw Joan Crawford do everything she could to save that girl's life and job."

Helen Hayes, June Allyson, and Vincent Sherman stated they had witnessed strict discipline. For example, Hayes and Sherman both stated in their autobiographies that they felt Joan was too strict a parent. Allyson stated in her autobiography that she witnessed Joan put Christina in "time-out", and did not let her go to a friend's birthday party as a punishment.

On July 20, 1998, Cathy Crawford LaLonde filed a lawsuit against her sister Christina Crawford for defamation of character. LaLonde stated in her lawsuit that during the 20th-anniversary book tour of Mommie Dearest, Christina publicly claimed to interviewers that LaLonde and her twin sister, Cynthia, were not biological sisters and that their adoption was never legal. Lalonde stated neither claim by Christina was true and attached copies of the twin girls' birth certificates and adoption documentation to the lawsuit. The lawsuit was later settled out of court for $5,000 plus court costs. Lawyer Richard Orloski, representing the twins at the time, said, “We proved our point, and her adopted sister should now be careful in the future, knowing she'll be held accountable for her words".

== Epilogue ==
In 1981, the book was adapted into a movie, starring Faye Dunaway. Christina gave negative feedback about the film. For example, Christina never alleged to have been beaten by her mother; specifically, that she was never hit with a wire hanger, or that her mother chopped down a tree with an axe.

The last pages of Christina's book suggest that she was not about to let her mother have the "last word" by omitting her daughter from her will. Biographer Fred Laurence Guiles later reported that Christina began writing her book before Crawford's death. He has suggested that Joan's knowledge of its contents may have been a factor in her cutting her daughter from her will.

Christina later released a "20th Anniversary Edition", which included 100 pages of new material and omitted about 50 pages of original material. The second edition names specific individuals not named in the original book and focuses more on Christina's relationship with her mother from high school graduation until the 1970s. It also reveals what became of her brother and describes several incidents involving him.

Released by a smaller publishing company, the second edition included some novel promotional methods. This included Christina appearing at presentations of the Mommie Dearest film (based on the first edition of her book), where Christina lectured about the new edition of her book. Christina also appeared at readings with drag entertainer Lypsinka, who has made numerous appearances as Joan Crawford during stage acts.

In 2017 Crawford worked with lyricist and composer David Nehls on a stage musical adaptation of Mommie Dearest, which was produced by Out of the Box Theatrics in New York City.

== References in other media ==
Saturday Night Live featured a sketch parodying Mommie Dearest on the ninth episode of its fourth season, airing on December 16, 1978. Jane Curtin portrayed Joan Crawford as mercurial, ill-tempered, and micromanaging. Gilda Radner played an exaggerated version of young Christina as mute and possibly mentally handicapped, puffing her cheeks out and crossing her eyes as she sauntered around the set. This sketch, which took place around Christmas, also featured Dan Aykroyd as Clark Gable, Bill Murray as Cary Grant, Laraine Newman as Katharine Hepburn, and guest host Elliott Gould as fictional character Archer Armstrong.

Victoria Beckham referenced the famous wire hangers scene in her music video for "Let Your Head Go".

Four years after Joan Crawford's death, Blue Öyster Cult released the song "Joan Crawford" as part of their album Fire of Unknown Origin (1981). In the final third of the song, there is a voice calling "Christina" with the lines "Mother's home" and "Come to mother". In the background, the word "No" is repeated over and over. This is in reference to events described in the book.

== Editions ==
- Mommie Dearest, Christina Crawford, William Morrow & Co., 1978, ISBN 0-688-03386-5, hardcover
- Mommie Dearest, Christina Crawford, Seven Springs Press, 1997, ISBN 0-9663369-0-9, expanded edition. The book's 20th Anniversary Edition restored approximately 100 pages previously cut from the original 1978 printing. Christina Crawford bought back the book rights.
- Christina Crawford (2017). Mommie Dearest. Open Road Media. ISBN 978-1-5040-4908-5.

== See also ==
- I'm Glad My Mom Died
