= My Mother's Keeper =

1985 memoir by B. D. Hyman

- Author: B. D. Hyman
- Language: English
- Genre: Autobiography
- Published: 1985
- Publisher: William Morrow and Company
- Publication place: United States
- Media type: Hardcover; paperback
- ISBN: 978-0688047986

My Mother's Keeper is a 1985 memoir by B. D. Hyman, the daughter of actress Bette Davis, in which she alleges that Davis was a bullying, alcoholic mother.

== Overview ==
My Mother's Keeper is often compared to the 1978 book Mommie Dearest by Christina Crawford, the daughter of Bette's off-screen rival, Joan Crawford. Published after Crawford's book, My Mother's Keeper depicts Davis as a self-centered, emotionally manipulative alcoholic. Unlike Crawford, Hyman does not accuse her mother of any physical abuse. Indeed, she claims Davis was a battered wife and says Davis's husband, Gary Merrill, was a violent alcoholic. Unlike Crawford's book, which was published after the death of its subject, Hyman's book and a sequel titled Narrow Is the Way were published during Davis's lifetime.

== Reception ==
Gary Merrill called Hyman's motivation "cruelty and greed". Davis's adopted son, Michael Merrill, severed contact with Hyman and never spoke to her again, as did Davis, who disinherited her. Davis left her estate to Michael Merrill and her assistant, Kathryn Sermak. Davis's only public response to the allegations was an open letter to Hyman in her 1987 memoir, This 'n That, in which she wrote in part, "Your book is a glaring lack of loyalty and thanks for the very privileged life I feel you have been given. If my memory serves me right, I've been your keeper all these many years."
