= Bette Davis =

American actress (1908–1989)

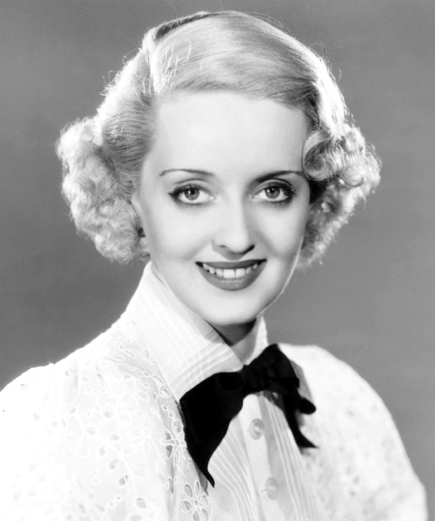
- Davis in 1935
- Born: Ruth Elizabeth Davis; April 5, 1908; Lowell, Massachusetts, U.S.
- Died: October 6, 1989 (aged 81); Neuilly-sur-Seine, France
- Resting place: Forest Lawn Memorial Park, Hollywood Hills
- Occupation: Actress
- Years active: 1929–1989
- Works: Full list
- Political party: Democratic
- Spouses: Harmon Oscar Nelson (m. 1932; div. 1938); Arthur Farnsworth (m. 1940; died 1943); William Grant Sherry (m. 1945; div. 1950); Gary Merrill (m. 1950; div. 1960)
- Children: 3, including B. D. Hyman
- Awards: Full list

Ruth Elizabeth "Bette" Davis (/ˈbɛti/; April 5, 1908 – October 6, 1989) was an American actress of film, television, and theater. Regarded as one of the greatest actresses in Hollywood history, she was noted for her willingness to play unsympathetic, sardonic characters and was known for her performances in a range of film genres, from contemporary crime melodramas to historical and period films and occasional comedies, although her greatest successes were her roles in romantic dramas. She won the Academy Award for Best Actress twice, was the first person to accrue ten Academy Award nominations (and one write-in) for acting, and was the first woman to receive a Lifetime Achievement Award from the American Film Institute.

After appearing in Broadway plays, Davis moved to Hollywood in 1930, but her early films for Universal Studios were unsuccessful. She joined Warner Bros. in 1932 and had her critical breakthrough playing a vulgar waitress in Of Human Bondage (1934). Contentiously, she was not among the three nominees for the Academy Award for Best Actress that year, and she won it the following year for her performance in Dangerous (1935). In 1936, due to poor film offers, she attempted to free herself from her contract, and although she lost a well-publicized legal case, it marked the beginning of the most successful period of her career. Until the late 1940s, she was one of American cinema's most celebrated leading ladies. She was praised for her role in Marked Woman (1937) and won a second Academy Award for her portrayal of a strong-willed 1850s Southern belle in Jezebel (1938), the first of five consecutive years in which she received a Best Actress nomination; the others for Dark Victory (1939), The Letter (1940), The Little Foxes (1941), and Now, Voyager (1942).

A period of decline in the late 1940s was redeemed with her role as a fading Broadway star in All About Eve (1950), which has often been cited as her best performance. She received Best Actress nominations for this film and for The Star (1952), but her career struggled over the rest of the decade. Her last nomination came for her role as the psychotic former child star Jane Hudson in the psychological horror film What Ever Happened to Baby Jane? (1962). In the latter stage of her career, Davis played character parts in films like Death on the Nile (1978) and shifted her focus to roles in television. She led the miniseries The Dark Secret of Harvest Home (1978), won an Emmy Award for Strangers: The Story of a Mother and Daughter (1979), and was nominated for her performances in White Mama (1980) and Little Gloria... Happy at Last (1982). Her last complete cinematic part was in the drama The Whales of August (1987).

Davis was known for her forceful and intense style of acting and her physical transformations. She gained a reputation as a perfectionist who could be highly combative, and confrontations with studio executives, film directors, and co-stars were often reported. Her forthright manner, clipped vocal style, and ubiquitous cigarette contributed to a public persona which has often been imitated. Davis was the co-founder of the Hollywood Canteen, and was the first female president of the Academy of Motion Picture Arts and Sciences. Her career went through several periods of eclipse, and she admitted that her success had often been at the expense of her personal relationships. Married four times, she was once widowed and three times divorced, and raised her children as a single parent. Her final years were marred by a long period of ill health, but she continued acting until shortly before her death from breast cancer, with more than 100 film, television, and theater roles to her credit. In 1999, Davis was placed second on the American Film Institute's list of the greatest female stars of classic Hollywood cinema, behind Katharine Hepburn.

== Life and career ==
=== 1908–1929: Childhood and early acting career ===
Ruth Elizabeth Davis, known from early childhood as "Betty", was born on April 5, 1908, in Lowell, Massachusetts, the daughter of Harlow Morrell Davis (1885–1938), a law student from Augusta, Maine, and subsequently a patent attorney, and Ruth Augusta (née Favór; 1885–1961), from Tyngsborough, Massachusetts. Davis's younger sister was Barbara Harriet (1909–1979). In 1915, after their parents separated, the two sisters attended a spartan boarding school, Crestalban, in Lanesborough, Massachusetts, for three years. To fund this her mother moved to New York City and found a job as a governess.

In the fall of 1921, Davis' mother rented an apartment on 144th Street and Broadway and moved the children to New York City. To better her earning power, Ruth enrolled herself in the Clarence White School of Photography, and her children in the local public school. She then worked as a portrait photographer.

During their time in New York, Davis became a Girl Scout, and a patrol leader. Her patrol won a competitive dress parade for Lou Hoover at Madison Square Garden. The young Betty later changed the spelling of her first name to Bette after Bette Fischer, a character in Honoré de Balzac's La Cousine Bette.

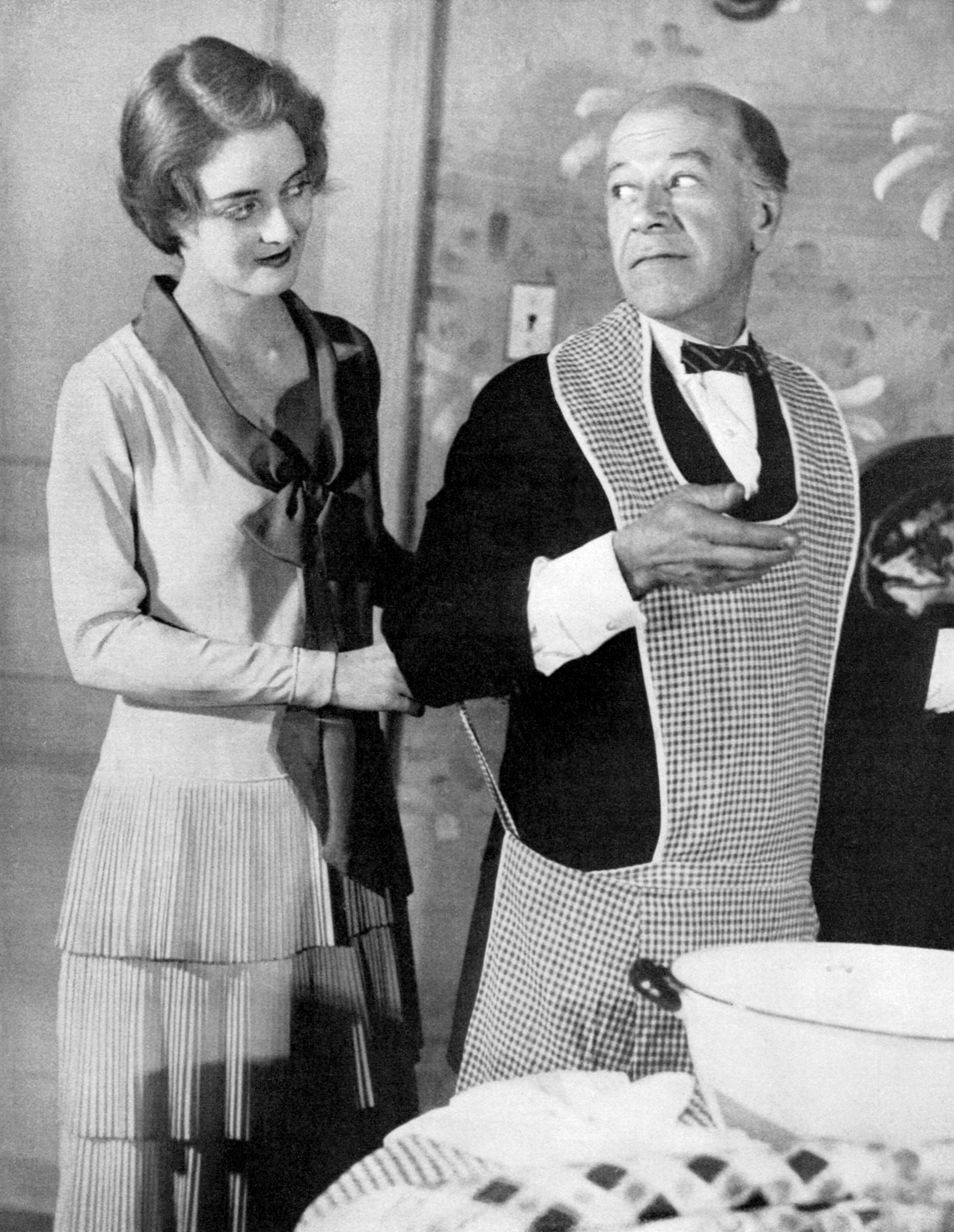
Bette Davis and Donald Meek in Broken Dishes (1929). "I was now a bona fide Broadway actress—in a hit," Davis wrote.

Davis attended Cushing Academy, a boarding school in Ashburnham, Massachusetts, where she met her future first husband, Harmon O. Nelson, known as Ham. In 1926, a then 18-year-old Davis saw a production of Henrik Ibsen's The Wild Duck with Blanche Yurka and Peg Entwistle. Davis later recalled, "The reason I wanted to go into theater was because of an actress named Peg Entwistle." Bette Davis interviewed with Eva Le Gallienne to be a student at her 14th Street theater. However, Le Gallienne felt Davis was not serious enough to attend her school, and described her attitude as "insincere" and "frivolous".

Davis auditioned for George Cukor's stock theater company in Rochester, New York. Though he was not very impressed, he gave Davis her first paid acting assignment – a one-week stint playing the part of a chorus girl in the play Broadway. Ed Sikov sources Davis's first professional role to a 1929 production by the Provincetown Players of Virgil Geddes' play The Earth Between; however, the production was postponed by a year. In 1929, Davis was chosen by Blanche Yurka to play Hedwig, the character she had seen Entwistle play in The Wild Duck. After performing in Philadelphia, Washington, and Boston, she made her Broadway debut in 1929 in Broken Dishes and followed it with Solid South.

=== 1930–1936: Early years in Hollywood ===
After appearing on Broadway in New York, the 22-year-old Davis moved to Hollywood in 1930 to screen test for Universal Studios. She was inspired to pursue a career as a film actress after seeing Mary Pickford in Little Lord Fauntleroy. Davis and her mother traveled by train to Hollywood. She later recounted her surprise that no-one from the studio was there to meet her. In fact, a studio employee had waited for her, but left because he saw no-one who "looked like an actress". Davis failed her first screen test, but was used in several screen tests for other actors.

In a 1971 interview with television talk show host Dick Cavett, she related the experience with the observation, "I was the most Yankee-est, most modest virgin who ever walked the earth. They laid me on a couch, and I tested fifteen men ... They all had to lie on top of me and give me a passionate kiss. Oh, I thought I would die. Just thought I would die." A second test was arranged for Davis, for the 1931 film A House Divided. Hastily dressed in an ill-fitting costume with a low neckline, she was rebuffed by the film director William Wyler, who loudly commented to the assembled crew, "What do you think of these dames who show their chests and think they can get jobs?".

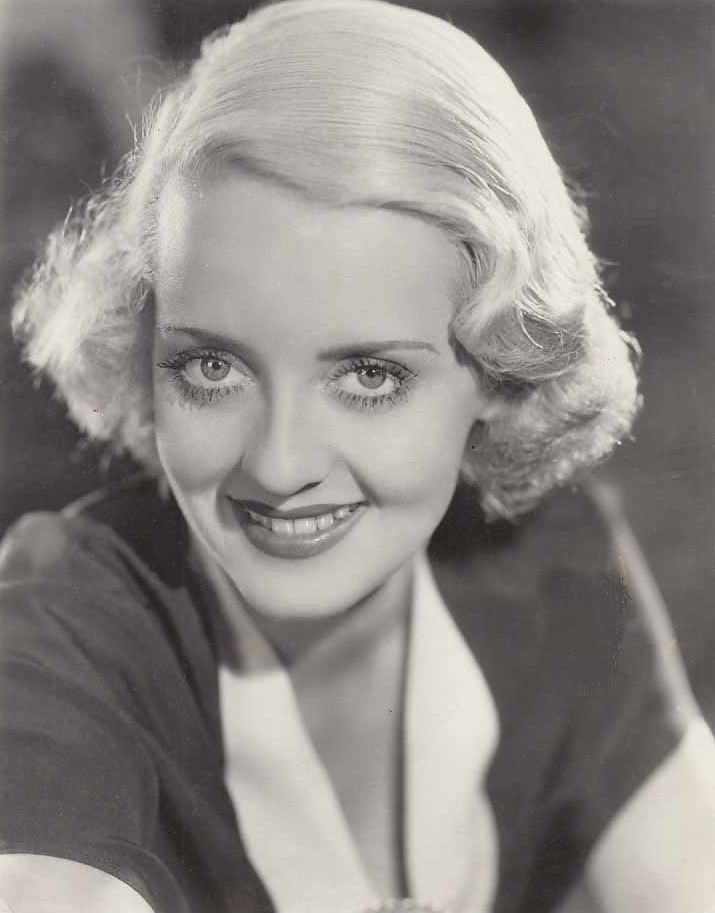
Bette Davis in Bureau of Missing Persons (1933)

Carl Laemmle, the head of Universal Studios, considered terminating Davis's employment, but cinematographer Karl Freund told him she had "lovely eyes" and would be suitable for Bad Sister (1931), in which she subsequently made her film debut. Her nervousness was compounded when she overheard the chief of production, Carl Laemmle, Jr., comment to another executive that she had "about as much sex appeal as Slim Summerville", one of the film's male co-stars. The film was not a success, and her next role in Seed (1931) was too brief to attract attention.

Universal Studios renewed her contract for three months, and she appeared in a small role in Waterloo Bridge (1931), before being lent to Columbia Pictures for The Menace, and to Capital Films for Hell's House (all 1932). After one year, and six unsuccessful films, Laemmle elected not to renew her contract.

Davis was preparing to return to New York when actor George Arliss chose Davis for the lead female role in the Warner Bros. picture The Man Who Played God (1932). For the rest of her life, Davis credited him with helping her achieve her "break" in Hollywood. The Saturday Evening Post wrote, "She is not only beautiful, but she bubbles with charm", and compared her to Constance Bennett and Olive Borden. Warner Bros. signed her to a seven-year contract, yet she remained with the studio for the next 18 years.

Davis's first marriage was to Harmon Oscar Nelson on August 18, 1932, in Yuma, Arizona. Their marriage was scrutinized by the press; his $100 a week earnings ($1,900 per week in 2024 dollars) compared unfavorably with Davis's reported $1,000 a week income ($19,000 per week in 2024 dollars). Davis addressed the issue in an interview, pointing out that many Hollywood wives earned more than their husbands, but the situation proved difficult for Nelson, who refused to allow Davis to purchase a house until he could afford to pay for it himself. Nelson was able to enforce his wishes because, at the time, the husband had the management and control of the community property, which included the wife's earnings, and the wife could not obtain credit without her husband's consent. Davis had two abortions during the marriage, each at Nelson's insistence.

Davis played Helen Bauer in the 1933 pre-Code drama Ex-Lady alongside Gene Raymond. However, the film was overshadowed by fellow actress Joan Crawford's divorce from her first husband, Douglas Fairbanks Jr., leading to its failure at the box office. Though Crawford had no malicious intent toward Davis, Davis was nonetheless angered by this turn of events, which led her to resent Crawford and began a lifelong feud between the two actresses.

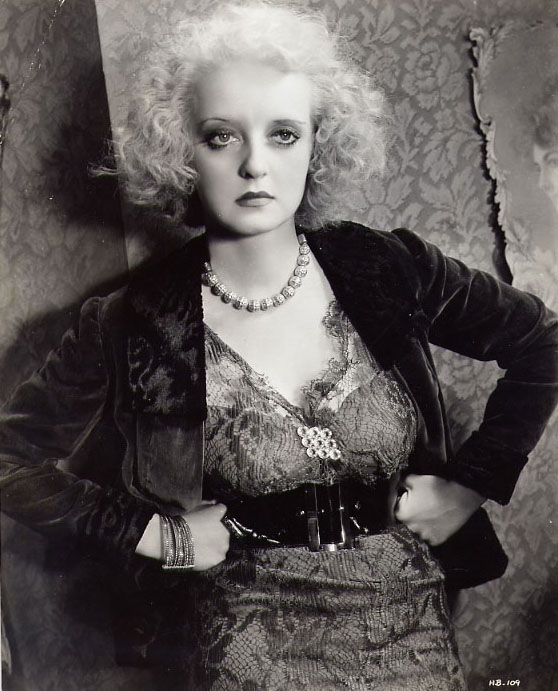
Davis in Of Human Bondage (1934)

After more than 20 film roles, she had her critical breakthrough playing the role of the vicious and slatternly Mildred Rogers in the RKO Radio production of Of Human Bondage (1934), a film adaptation of W. Somerset Maugham's novel. It earned Davis her first major critical acclaim, although, contentiously, she was not among the three nominees for the Academy Award for Best Actress that year. Many actresses feared playing unsympathetic characters, and several had refused the role, but Davis viewed it as an opportunity to show the range of her acting skills. Her co-star, Leslie Howard, was initially dismissive of her, but as filming progressed, his attitude changed, and he subsequently spoke highly of her abilities.

The film's director, John Cromwell, allowed her relative freedom. "I let Bette have her head. I trusted her instincts." Davis insisted that she be portrayed realistically in her death scene, and said, "The last stages of consumption, poverty, and neglect are not pretty, and I intended to be convincing-looking."

The film was a success, and Davis's characterization earned praise from critics, with Life writing that she gave "probably the best performance ever recorded on the screen by a U.S. actress". Davis anticipated that her reception would encourage Warner Bros. to cast her in more important roles, and was disappointed when Jack L. Warner refused to lend her to Columbia Studios to appear in It Happened One Night, and instead cast her in the melodrama Housewife. When Davis was not nominated for an Academy Award for Of Human Bondage, The Hollywood Citizen News questioned the omission, and Norma Shearer, herself a nominee, joined a campaign to have Davis nominated. This prompted an announcement from the Academy president, Howard Estabrook, who said that under the circumstances, "any voter...may write on the ballot his or her personal choice for the winners", thus allowing, for the only time in the Academy's history, the consideration of a candidate not officially nominated for an award. The uproar led, however, to a change in academy voting procedures the following year, wherein nominations were determined by votes from all eligible members of a particular branch, rather than by a smaller committee, with results independently tabulated by the accounting firm Price Waterhouse. The next year, A Midsummer Night's Dream became the only film to win a write-in Oscar, for Best Cinematography.

The next year, her performance as a down-and-out troubled actress in Dangerous (1935) received very good reviews and landed Davis her first Best Actress nomination and win. E. Arnot Robertson wrote in Picture Post that, "I think Bette Davis would probably have been burned as a witch if she had lived two or three hundred years ago. She gives the curious feeling of being charged with power which can find no ordinary outlet". The New York Times hailed her as "becoming one of the most interesting of our screen actresses". She won the Academy Award for Best Actress for the role, but commented that it was belated recognition for Of Human Bondage, calling the award a "consolation prize". For the rest of her life, Davis maintained that she gave the statue its familiar name of "Oscar" because its posterior resembled that of her husband, whose middle name was Oscar, although, the Academy of Motion Picture Arts and Sciences officially makes reference to another story.

Davis had not expected to win the award, so she had worn only a plain dress. At the 8th Academy Awards, where she received the award, fellow attendee Joan Crawford said to her, "Dear Bette! What a lovely frock." She had attended with her second husband, Franchot Tone, with whom Davis had been in love, but Crawford had married in 1935. Both of these events led to more contention between the two actresses, who had already clashed in 1933. Later on, when they shared dressing rooms near to each other, Crawford tried to make a truce with Davis by sending her gifts, all of which Davis returned.

In her next film, The Petrified Forest (1936), Davis co-starred with Leslie Howard and Humphrey Bogart.

==== Warner Bros vs. Bette Davis ====
In the spring of 1936, Davis asked Warner Bros. to loan her out to RKO to make Mary of Scotland. Warner Bros. refused and assigned Davis two films that were written specifically for her: God's Country and the Woman, and Mountain Justice. However, as God's Country and the Woman was going into production, Davis refused to work, and demanded a salary increase on her contract with Warner Bros. At the time, Davis was earning $1,250 per week. Jack Warner offered Davis an increased salary of $2,250 per week, which Davis refused. Davis's agent, Mike Levee, said: "She's a very stubborn young lady. I asked her how much she wanted, and she said $3,500 a week, plus all radio rights and permission to make outside pictures. I told her, 'Whoa, that's too much!'"

Meanwhile, due to Davis's refusal to continue with God's Country and the Woman, Warner Bros. was incurring excessive production costs because the film was being made in Technicolor, and the Technicolor cameras were rented. In late June, the studio put Davis on suspension for refusal to work, and replaced her in the film with Beverly Roberts.

During negotiations with Warner Bros. regarding her salary and signing Davis for the female lead in Danton, Davis abruptly traveled to England with her husband, Harmon Nelson, on a "vacation". However, in England, Davis signed a contract with British film production company Toplitz, to make the film I'll Take the Low Road in England with Maurice Chevalier for a $50,000 salary.

On September 9, 1936, Warner Brothers filed a legal injunction against Davis in England which forbade her from appearing in film productions without their consent. While on a shopping spree in Paris, Davis publicly declared to the press that she intended to defy Warner Bros' legal injunction and make the film in England.

On October 14, 1936, the British court held a hearing regarding the studio's injunction against Davis. Mr Justice Branson issued his decision on October 19, ruling in favor of Warner Bros. Justice Branson dismissed Davis's representative's claims that she was an "underpaid slave" held under a "life sentence", and ruled that Davis was in breach of her contract to Warner "for no discoverable reason except that she wanted more money".

Davis was ordered to pay Warner Bros. $80,000 in restitution, and was also ordered to pay the studio's legal fees for filing the injunction in England. The British press offered little support to Davis, calling her overpaid and ungrateful.

=== 1937–1941: Success with Warner Bros. ===
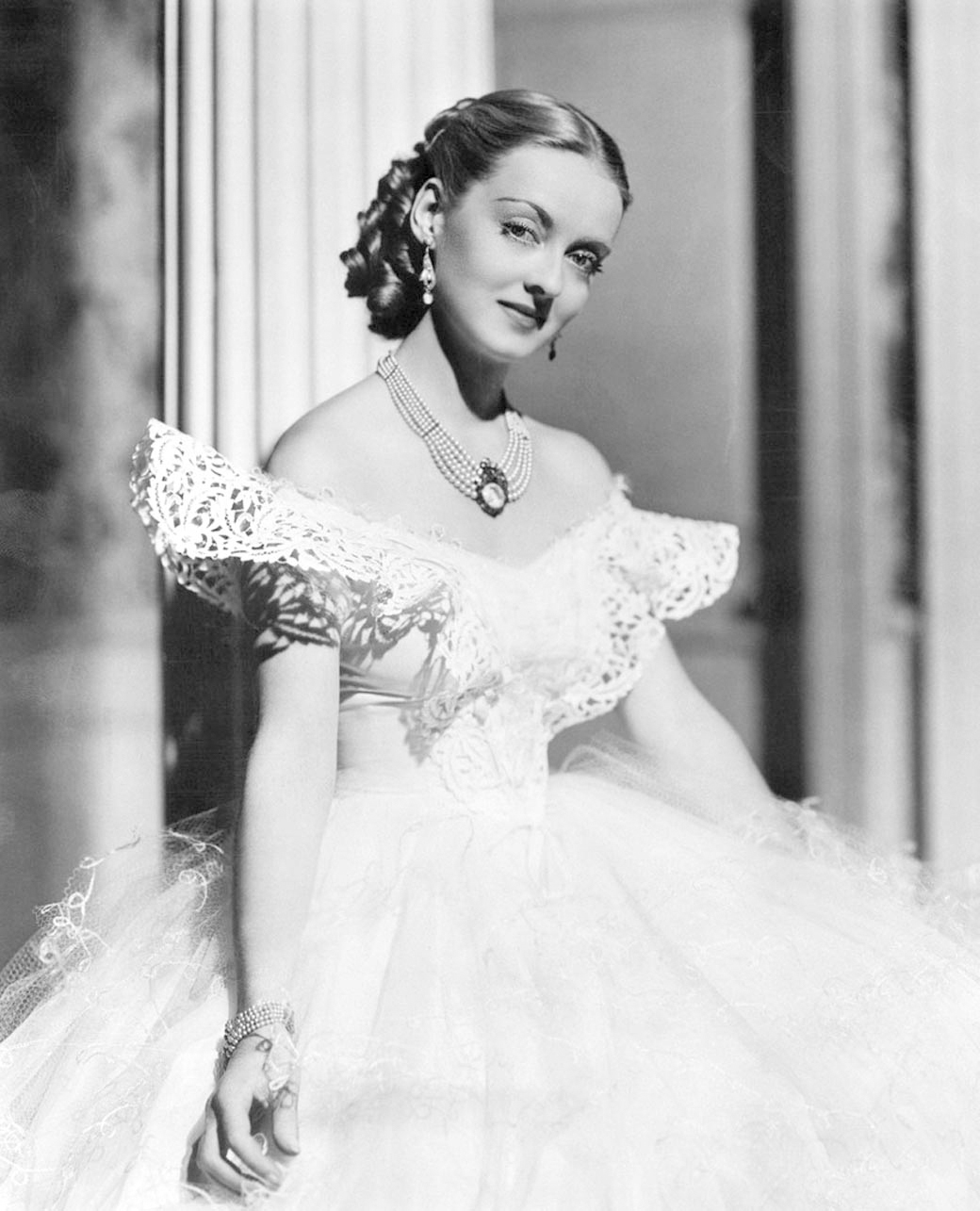
Davis in Jezebel (1938)

In 1937, Davis starred with Humphrey Bogart in Marked Woman, a contemporary gangster drama inspired by the case of Lucky Luciano, and a film regarded as one of the most important in her early career. She was awarded the Volpi Cup at the 1937 Venice Film Festival for her performance.

Davis's portrayal of a strong-willed 1850s Southern belle in Jezebel (1938) won her a second Academy Award for Best Actress. This was the first of five consecutive years in which she received the Best Actress nomination. During production, Davis entered a relationship with director William Wyler. She later described him as the "love of my life", and said that making the film with him was "the time in my life of my most perfect happiness". The film was a success.

This led to speculation in the press that she would be chosen to play Scarlett O'Hara, a similar character, in Gone with the Wind. Davis expressed her desire to play Scarlett, and while David O. Selznick was conducting a search for the actress to play the role, a radio poll named her as the audience favorite. Warner offered her services to Selznick as part of a deal that also included Errol Flynn and Olivia de Havilland, but Selznick did not consider Davis as suitable, and rejected the offer. Davis, on the other hand, did not want Flynn cast as Rhett Butler. Newcomer Vivien Leigh was cast as Scarlett O'Hara, de Havilland landed a role as Melanie, and both of them were nominated for the Oscars, with Leigh winning.

Jezebel marked the beginning of the most successful phase of Davis's career, and over the next few years, she was listed in the annual Quigley Poll of the Top Ten Money-Making Stars, which was compiled from the votes of movie exhibitors throughout the U.S. for the stars who had generated the most revenue in their theaters over the previous year.

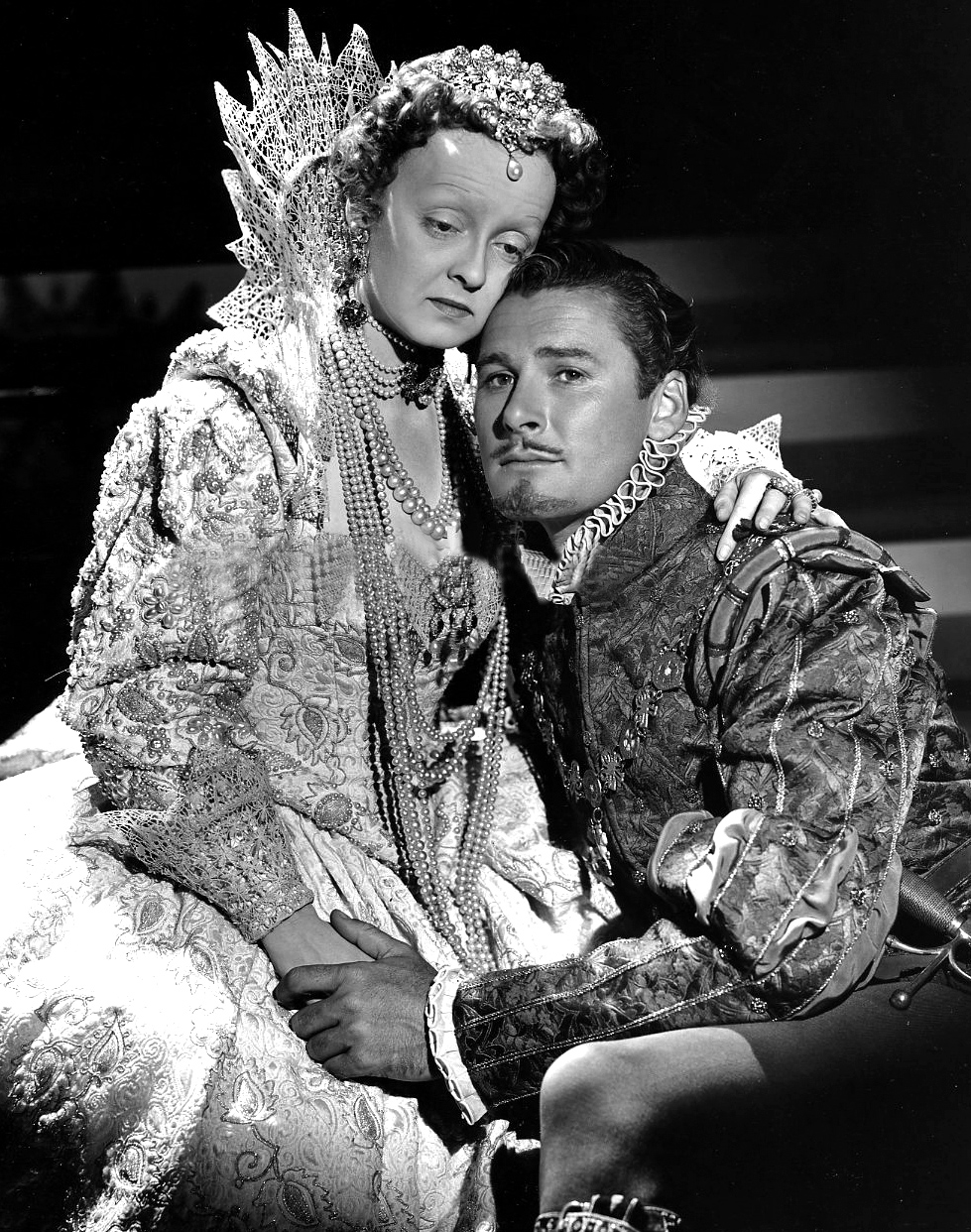
Davis with Errol Flynn in The Private Lives of Elizabeth and Essex (1939). At the time she played 60-year-old Elizabeth I, she was only 30 years old.

In contrast to Davis's success, her husband Ham Nelson had failed to establish a career for himself, and their relationship faltered. In 1938, Nelson obtained evidence that Davis was engaged in a sexual relationship with Howard Hughes, and subsequently filed for divorce, citing Davis's "cruel and inhuman manner". He also claimed she read books and her film manuscripts too often. By this time they had been living distant lives, as Davis's career often kept her preoccupied. "I was married to Ham only in name...When we were together, there was nothing left between us," biographer David Thomson quoted her saying. "Any happy days we had had were in our memories almost entirely before we married. The terrible distance when we were together was harder to bear than when we were apart. We no longer communicated with each other at all. And our sex life had disappeared, a woman who's been with just one man for a long time is practically a virgin again." Nelson remarried in 1946 and died in 1975.

Nevertheless, Davis had wanted desperately for the marriage to work out and was devastated when it failed. She was emotional during the making of her next film, Dark Victory (1939), and considered abandoning it until the producer Hal B. Wallis convinced her to channel her despair into her acting. The film was among the high-grossing films of the year, and the role of Judith Traherne, a spirited heiress suffering from a malignant brain tumor, brought her an Academy Award nomination. In later years, Davis cited this performance as her personal favorite. Dark Victory paired her with frequent future leading man George Brent, and featured Ronald Reagan and Humphrey Bogart in supporting roles.

Davis appeared in three other box-office hits in 1939: The Old Maid with Miriam Hopkins, Juarez with Paul Muni, and The Private Lives of Elizabeth and Essex with Errol Flynn. The last was her first color film, and her only color film made during the height of her career. To play the elderly Queen Elizabeth I, Davis shaved her hairline and eyebrows. During filming, Davis was visited on the set by the actor Charles Laughton. She commented that she had a "nerve" playing a woman in her 60s, to which Laughton replied: "Never not dare to hang yourself. That's the only way you grow in your profession. You must continually attempt things that you think are beyond you, or you get into a complete rut." Recalling the episode many years later, Davis remarked that Laughton's advice had influenced her throughout her career.

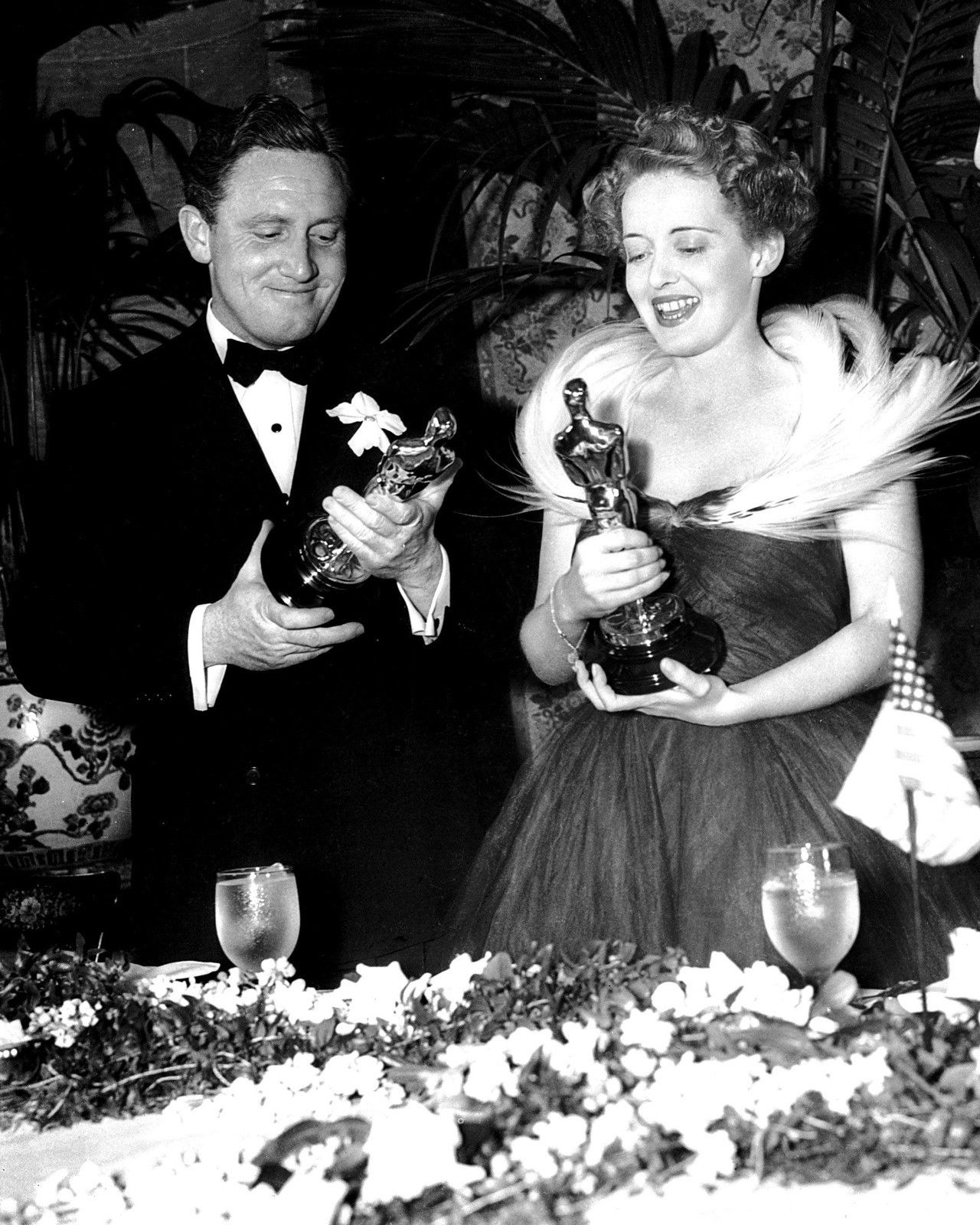
Davis with Spencer Tracy at the 1939 Academy Awards

By this time, Davis was Warner Bros.' most profitable star, and she was given the most important of their female leading roles. Her image was considered with more care; although she continued to play character roles, she was often filmed in close-ups that emphasized her distinctive eyes. All This, and Heaven Too (1940) was the most financially successful film of Davis's career to that point.

The Letter (1940) was considered "one of the best pictures of the year" by The Hollywood Reporter, and Davis won admiration for her portrayal of an adulterous killer, a role originated onstage by Katharine Cornell. During this time, she was in a relationship with her former co-star George Brent, who proposed marriage. Davis refused, as she had met Arthur Farnsworth, a New England innkeeper, and Vermont dentist's son. Davis and Farnsworth were married at Home Ranch, in Rimrock, Arizona, in December 1940, her second marriage.

In January 1941, Davis became the first female president of the Academy of Motion Picture Arts and Sciences but antagonized the committee members with her brash manner and radical proposals. Davis rejected the idea of her being just "a figurehead only". Faced with the disapproval and resistance of the committee, Davis resigned and was succeeded by her predecessor Walter Wanger.

Davis starred in three movies in 1941, the first being The Great Lie, with George Brent. It was a refreshingly different role for Davis as she played a kind, sympathetic character. William Wyler also directed Davis for the third time in Lillian Hellman's The Little Foxes (1941), but they clashed over the character of Regina Giddens, a role originally played on Broadway by Tallulah Bankhead (Davis had portrayed in film a role initiated by Bankhead on the stage once before – in Dark Victory). Wyler encouraged Davis to emulate Bankhead's interpretation of the role, but Davis wanted to make the role her own. She received another Academy Award nomination for her performance, and never worked with Wyler again.

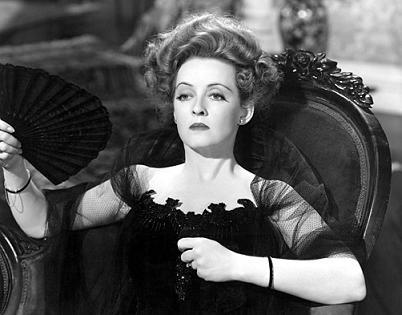
Davis often played unlikable characters such as Regina Giddens in The Little Foxes (1941).

=== 1942–1944: War years ===
In 1943, Davis told an interviewer that she had molded her film career on her motto, "I love tragedy," and ironically, until Pearl Harbor, she had been recognized as the American favorite of Japanese moviegoers—because to them, she "represented the admirable principle of sad self-sacrifice."

In 1942, numerous Hollywood entertainment industry members joined forces to form the Hollywood Canteen. Davis and John Garfield were the driving force who were credited with founding the canteen, along with the aid of 42 unions and guilds in the industry, plus thousands of celebrity volunteers from the Hollywood Victory Committee and beyond. The Canteen offered food, dancing and entertainment for servicemen and was staffed by members of the entertainment industry. Davis served as Canteen president through the end of the war. In 1983, Davis received the Distinguished Civilian Service Medal from the Department of Defense for her work with the Hollywood Canteen.

She appeared as herself in the film Hollywood Canteen (1944), which used the canteen as the setting for a fictional story. Warner Bros. donated 40% of proceeds from the film to both the Hollywood Canteen and the Stage Door Canteen in Manhattan.

Davis showed little interest for the role of repressed spinster Charlotte Vale in the drama film Now, Voyager (1942), until Hal Wallis advised her that female audiences needed romantic dramas to distract them from the reality of their lives. It became one of the better known of her "women's pictures". In one of the film's most imitated scenes, Paul Henreid lights two cigarettes as he stares into Davis's eyes, and passes one to her. Film reviewers complimented Davis on her performance, the National Board of Review commenting that she gave the film "a dignity not fully warranted by the script". She received her seventh Oscar nomination for Now, Voyager. That same year, she was also cast against type opposite Monty Woolley in the hit comedy The Man Who Came to Dinner (1942).

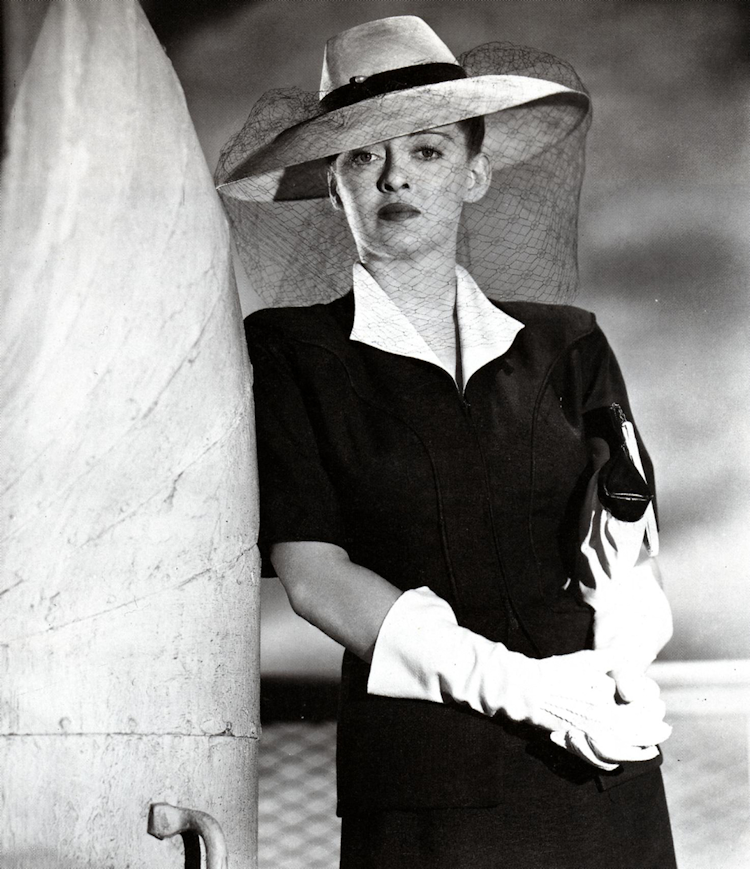
Davis in Now, Voyager (1942), one of her most iconic roles

During the early 1940s, several of Davis's film choices were influenced by the war, such as Watch on the Rhine (1943), by Lillian Hellman, and Thank Your Lucky Stars (1943), a lighthearted all-star musical cavalcade. Davis performed a novelty song, "They're Either Too Young or Too Old." Old Acquaintance (1943) reunited her with Miriam Hopkins in a story of two old friends who deal with the tensions created when one of them becomes a successful novelist. Davis felt that Hopkins tried to upstage her throughout the film. Director Vincent Sherman recalled the intense competition and animosity between the two actresses, and Davis often joked that she held back nothing in a scene in which she was required to shake Hopkins in a fit of anger.

In August 1943, Davis' husband, Arthur Farnsworth, collapsed while walking along a Hollywood street and died two days later. An autopsy revealed that his fall had been caused by a skull fracture he had suffered two weeks earlier having accidentally fallen down a flight of stairs. A finding of accidental death was reached. Highly distraught, Davis attempted to withdraw from her next film Mr. Skeffington (1944), but Jack Warner, who had halted production following Farnsworth's death, persuaded her to continue. Although she had gained a reputation for being forthright and demanding, her behavior during filming of Mr. Skeffington was said to be erratic and out of character. She alienated Vincent Sherman by refusing to film certain scenes and insisting that some sets be rebuilt. She improvised dialogue, which made the writer Julius Epstein rewrite scenes at her whim. Davis later explained her actions with the observation "When I was most unhappy, I lashed out rather than whined." Some reviewers criticized Davis for the excess of her performance; James Agee wrote that she "demonstrates the horrors of egocentricity on a marathonic scale". Despite these reviews, Mr. Skeffington was another box-office hit and earned Davis another Academy Award nomination.

=== 1945–1949: Career setbacks ===
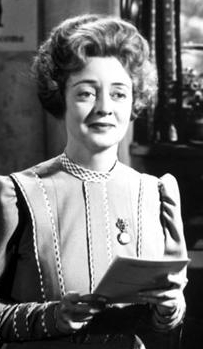
In The Corn Is Green (1945)

In 1945, Davis married artist William Grant Sherry, her third husband, who also worked as a masseur. She had been drawn to him because he claimed he had never heard of her and so was not intimidated by her.

The same year, Davis made The Corn Is Green (1945), based on the play by Emlyn Williams. Davis played Miss Moffat, an English teacher who saves a young Welsh miner (John Dall) from a life in the coal pits by offering him education. The part had been played in the theater by Ethel Barrymore (who was 61 at the play's premiere), but Warner Bros. felt that the film version should depict the character as a younger woman. Davis disagreed, and insisted on playing the part as written, and wore a gray wig and padding under her clothes, to create a dowdy appearance. The critic E. Arnot Robertson observed:

Only Bette Davis...could have combated so successfully the obvious intention of the adaptors of the play to make frustrated sex the mainspring of the chief character's interest in the young miner.

She concluded that "the subtle interpretation she insisted on giving" kept the focus on the teacher's "sheer joy in imparting knowledge". The film was well received by critics, and made a profit of $2.2 million.

Her next film, A Stolen Life (1946), was the only film that Davis made with her own production company, BD Productions. Davis played dual roles as twins. The film received poor reviews, and was described by Bosley Crowther as "a distressingly empty piece"; but, with a profit of $2.5 million, it was one of her biggest box office successes. Her next film was Deception (1946), the first of her films to lose money. In 1947, at the age of 39, Davis gave birth to daughter Barbara Davis Sherry (known as B.D.), and later wrote in her memoir that she became absorbed in motherhood and considered ending her career. As she continued making films, however, her relationship with her daughter B.D. began to deteriorate, and her popularity with audiences steadily declined.

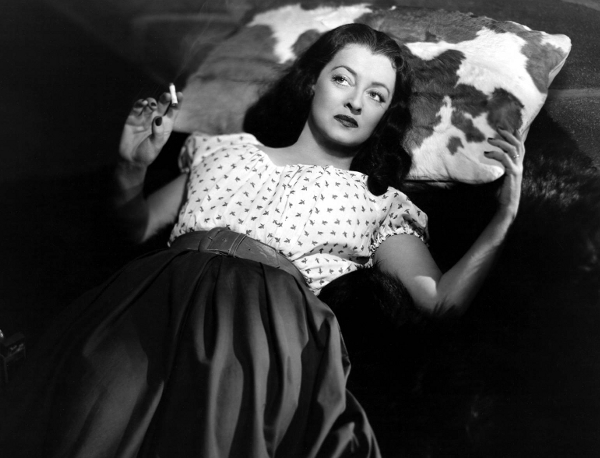
Beyond the Forest (1949) was the last film Davis made for Warner Bros. after 17 years with the studio.

In 1948, Davis was cast in the melodrama Winter Meeting. Although she initially was enthusiastic, she soon learned that Warner had arranged for "softer" lighting to be used to disguise her age. She recalled that she had seen the same lighting technique "on the sets of Ruth Chatterton and Kay Francis, and I knew what they meant". To add to her disappointment, she was not confident in the abilities of her leading man – Jim Davis in his first major screen role. She disagreed with changes made to the script because of censorship restrictions, and found that many of the aspects of the role that initially appealed to her had been cut. The film was described by Bosley Crowther as "interminable", and he noted that "of all the miserable dilemmas in which Miss Davis has been involved...this one is probably the worst". It failed at the box office, and the studio lost nearly $1 million.

While making June Bride (1948), Davis clashed with co-star Robert Montgomery, later describing him as "a male Miriam Hopkins...an excellent actor, but addicted to scene-stealing". The film marked her first comedy in several years, and earned her some positive reviews, but it was not particularly popular with audiences, and returned only a small profit.

Despite the lackluster box-office receipts from her more recent films, in 1949, she negotiated a four-film contract with Warner Bros. that paid $10,285 per week and made her the highest-paid woman in the United States. However, Jack Warner had refused to allow her script approval, and cast her in Beyond the Forest (1949). Davis reportedly loathed the script and begged Warner to recast the role, but he refused. After the film was completed, her request to be released from her contract was honored.

The reviews of the film were scathing. Dorothy Manners, writing for the Los Angeles Examiner, described the film as "an unfortunate finale to her brilliant career". Hedda Hopper wrote: "If Bette had deliberately set out to wreck her career, she could not have picked a more appropriate vehicle." The film contained the line "What a dump!", which became closely associated with Davis after it was referenced in Edward Albee's Who's Afraid of Virginia Woolf?, and impersonators began to use it in their acts. Arthur Blake was a famous female impersonator of the post World-War II era who was particularly known for his performances as Bette Davis; notably impersonating her in the 1952 film Diplomatic Courier.

=== 1949–1960: Starting a freelance career ===
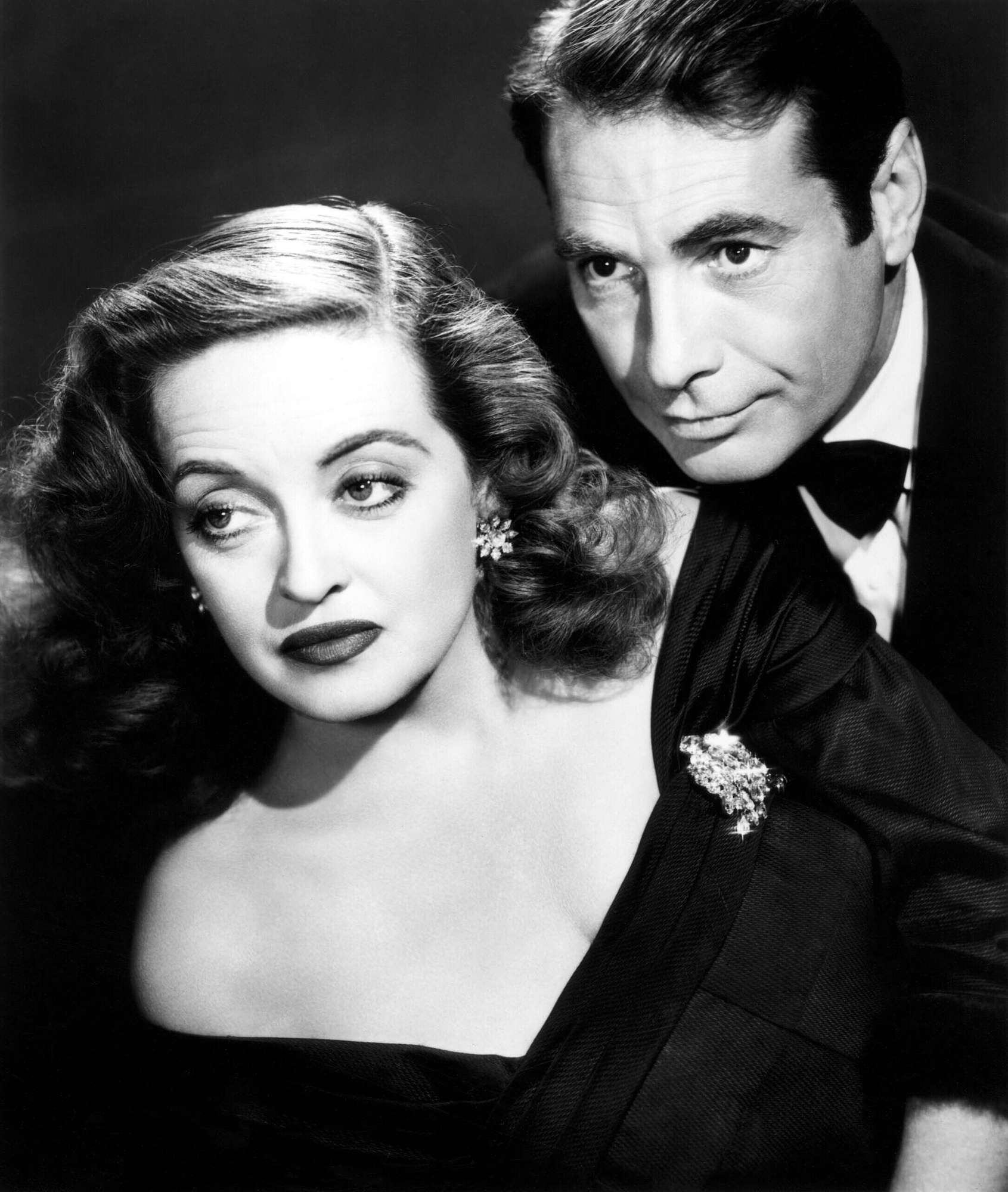
Davis posing as Margo Channing in a promotional image for All About Eve (1950): She is pictured with Gary Merrill, to whom she was married from 1950 to 1960, her fourth, and final, husband.

Davis filmed The Story of a Divorce (released by RKO Radio Pictures in 1951 as Payment on Demand). She played a Broadway star in All About Eve (1950), which earned her another Oscar nomination and won her the Cannes Film Festival Award for Best Actress. Davis read the script, described it as the best she had ever read, and accepted the role. Within days, she joined the cast in San Francisco to begin filming. During production, she established what became a lifelong friendship with her co-star Anne Baxter and a romantic relationship with her leading man Gary Merrill, which led to marriage. The film's director Joseph L. Mankiewicz later remarked: "Bette was letter perfect. She was syllable-perfect. The director's dream: the prepared actress."

Critics responded positively to Davis's performance, and several of her lines became well-known, particularly "Fasten your seat belts, it's going to be a bumpy night". She was again nominated for an Academy Award, and critics such as Gene Ringgold described her Margo as her "all-time best performance". Pauline Kael wrote that much of Mankiewicz's vision of "the theater" was "nonsense", but commended Davis, writing "[the film is] saved by one performance that is the real thing: Bette Davis is at her most instinctive and assured. Her actress – vain, scared, a woman who goes too far in her reactions and emotions – makes the whole thing come alive."

Davis won a Best Actress award from the Cannes Film Festival, and the New York Film Critics Circle Award. She also received the San Francisco Film Critics Circle Award as Best Actress, having been named by them as the Worst Actress of 1949 for Beyond the Forest. During this time, she was invited to leave her hand prints in the forecourt of Grauman's Chinese Theatre.

On July 3, 1950, Davis's divorce from William Sherry was finalized. On July 28, she married Gary Merrill, her fourth and final husband. With Sherry's consent, Merrill adopted B.D., Davis's daughter with Sherry. In January 1951, Davis and Merrill adopted a five-day-old baby girl they named Margot Mosher Merrill (born January 6, 1951 - died May 5, 2022), after the character Margo Channing.

In 1952, they adopted a baby boy, Michael, born February 5, 1952. Davis and Merrill lived with their three children on an estate on the coast of Cape Elizabeth, Maine. Davis and Merrill also stayed at Homewood Inn in Yarmouth, Maine, for six months. After semi-retirement in the mid-1950s, Davis again starred in several movies during her time in Maine, including The Virgin Queen (1955), in which she again played Queen Elizabeth I.

The family traveled to England, where Davis and Merrill starred in the murder-mystery film Another Man's Poison (1951). When it received lukewarm reviews and failed at the box office, Hollywood columnists wrote that Davis's comeback had petered out, and an Academy Award nomination for The Star (1952) did not halt her decline at the box office. In it, she played a character who many thought took to be a parody of Davis's rival Joan Crawford.

In 1952, Davis appeared in the Broadway revue Two's Company, directed by Jules Dassin. She was uncomfortable working outside of her area of expertise; she never had been a musical performer, and her limited theater experience had been more than 20 years earlier. She was also severely ill and was operated on for osteomyelitis of the jaw. Margot was diagnosed as severely brain-damaged due to an injury sustained during or shortly after her birth. Though Davis tried to care for Margot, she eventually placed her daughter in an institution around the age of 3. Davis and Merrill began arguing frequently, and B.D. later recalled episodes of alcohol abuse and domestic violence.

Few of Davis's films of the 1950s were successful, and many of her performances were condemned by critics. The Hollywood Reporter wrote of mannerisms "that you'd expect to find in a nightclub impersonation of [Davis]", while the London critic Richard Winninger wrote

Miss Davis, with more say than most stars as to what films she makes, seems to have lapsed into egoism. The criterion for her choice of film would appear to be that nothing must compete with the full display of each facet of the Davis art. Only bad films are good enough for her.

Her films of this period included Storm Center (1956) and The Catered Affair (1956). As her career declined, her marriage continued to deteriorate until she filed for divorce in 1960. The following year, her mother died. During the same time, she tried television, appearing in three episodes of the popular NBC Western Wagon Train as three different characters in 1959 and 1961; her first appearance on TV had been February 25, 1956, on General Electric Theatre.

In 1959, she starred alongside Alec Guinness in the film The Scapegoat.

In 1960, Davis, a registered Democrat, appeared at the 1960 Democratic National Convention in Los Angeles, where she met future President John F. Kennedy, whom she greatly admired. Outside of acting and politics, Davis was an active and practicing Episcopalian.

=== 1961–1970: Renewed success ===
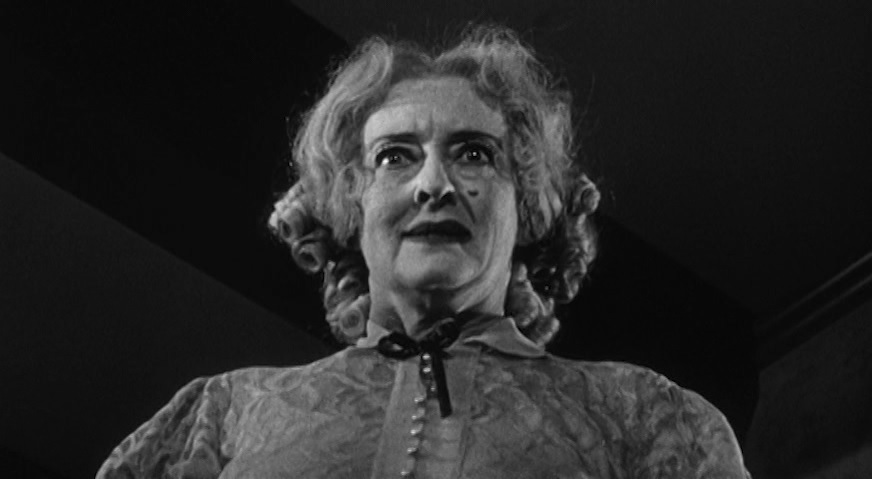
Davis received her final Academy Award nomination for her role as demented "Baby Jane" Hudson in What Ever Happened to Baby Jane? (1962).

In 1961, Davis opened in the Broadway production The Night of the Iguana to mostly mediocre reviews, and left the production after four months due to "chronic illness". She then joined Glenn Ford and Hope Lange for the Frank Capra film Pocketful of Miracles (1961), a remake of Capra's 1933 film, Lady for a Day, based on a story by Damon Runyon. Exhibitors protested her star billing as they considered it would negatively impact the box office performance and, despite the appearance of Ford, the film failed at the box office.

Her last Oscar nomination was for the Grand Guignol horror film What Ever Happened to Baby Jane? (1962), which also starred Joan Crawford. Crawford showed interest in the script and considered Davis for the part of the demented former child star Baby Jane Hudson. Davis believed it could appeal to the same audience that had recently made Alfred Hitchcock's Psycho (1960) a success. She negotiated a deal that would pay her 10 percent of the worldwide gross profits in addition to her salary, along with the conditions that she play Jane, and that Crawford was not sleeping in the same bed as the director, Robert Aldrich. The film became one of the year's big successes.

Davis and Crawford played two aging sisters, one a former child star (Davis) and the other an accomplished film actress (Crawford) who were forced by circumstance to share a decaying Hollywood mansion. Aldrich explained that Davis and Crawford were each aware of how important the film was to their respective careers. Regardless of their personal feelings toward one another, Davis and Crawford spoke highly of each other's acting talent. Crawford said Davis was a "fascinating actress", but they never became friends as they only worked on that one film together and had few opportunities outside that association. Davis also said Crawford was a good, professional actress. Despite the alleged "feud," Crawford heavily promoted Davis's performance. Crawford told reporter Wayne Allen, "I'll predict here and now that Miss Davis will win an Oscar for it."

However, on set, the two actresses constantly argued, and called Aldrich nightly to complain about one another. Davis reportedly called Crawford obscene words while she was within earshot. They also physically attacked each other: in a scene where Jane drags Blanche (Crawford's character), Crawford made herself as heavy as possible to make the scene agonizing for Davis, who was struggling with back problems. In another scene where Jane beats Blanche, Davis hit Crawford as hard as she could. At the 35th Academy Awards, where Davis was nominated for her last Academy Award for Best Actress, actress Anne Bancroft won instead, for The Miracle Worker. As Bancroft was absent from the ceremony, Crawford accepted the Oscar in her place, while Davis looked on in horror. Crawford had arranged this, persuading several actresses who could not attend to allow her to collect their award should they win, likely to slight Davis. Davis and Crawford were later attached to star in Hush...Hush, Sweet Charlotte (1964), but Crawford later quit production, owing it to an illness. However, the real reason was to avoid Davis. She was replaced by Olivia de Havilland, a close friend of Davis. Their alleged feud was eventually turned into the 2017 limited series Feud by Ryan Murphy.

Davis also received her only BAFTA nomination for this performance. Crawford did as well, but both lost to Patricia Neal. Daughter Barbara (credited as B.D. Merrill) played a small role in the film, and when she and Davis visited the Cannes Film Festival to promote it, Barbara met Jeremy Hyman, an executive for Seven Arts Productions. After a short courtship, she married Hyman at the age of 16, with Davis's permission. They had two sons and were married until Hyman's death in 2017.

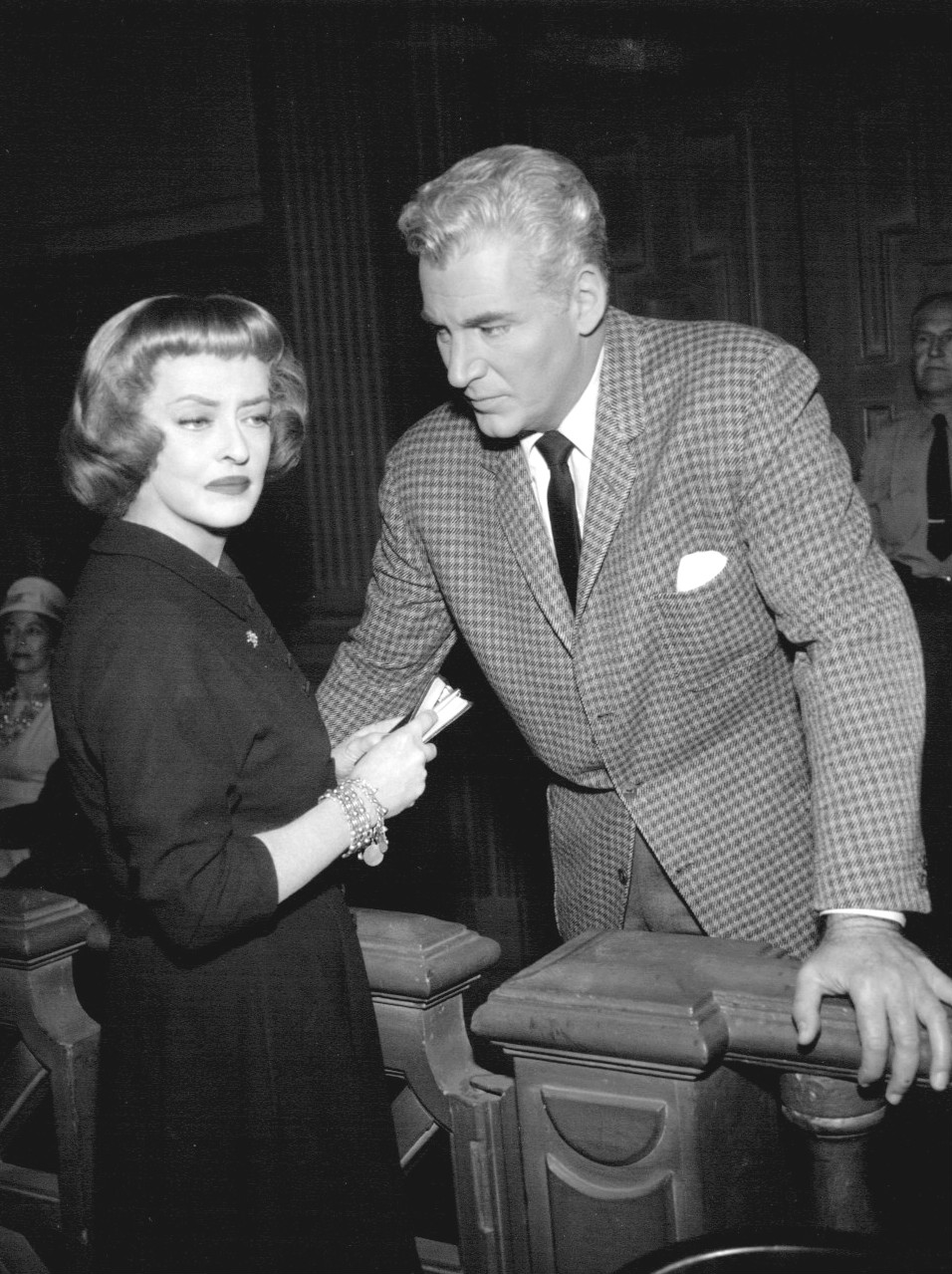
Davis and William Hopper in the Perry Mason episode "The Case of Constant Doyle" (1963)

In October 1962, it was announced that four episodes of the CBS-TV series Perry Mason would feature special guest stars who would cover for Raymond Burr during his convalescence from surgery. A Perry Mason fan, Davis was the first of the guest stars. "The Case of Constant Doyle" began filming on December 12, 1962, and aired January 31, 1963.

In 1962, Davis appeared as Celia Miller on the TV western The Virginian in the episode titled "The Accomplice."

In September 1962, Davis placed an advertisement in Variety under the heading of "Situations wanted – women artists", which read: "Mother of three – 10, 11, & 15 – divorcee. American. Thirty years' experience as an actress in Motion Pictures. Mobile still, and more affable than rumor would have it. Wants steady employment in Hollywood. (Has had Broadway.)" Davis said that she intended it as a joke, and she sustained her comeback over the course of several years.

Dead Ringer (1964) was a crime drama in which she played twin sisters. The film was an American adaptation of the Mexican film La Otra, starring Dolores del Río. Where Love Has Gone (1964) was a romantic drama based on a Harold Robbins novel. Davis played the mother of Susan Hayward, but filming was hampered by heated arguments between Davis and Hayward.

Hush...Hush, Sweet Charlotte (1964) was Robert Aldrich's follow-up to What Ever Happened to Baby Jane?. Aldrich planned to reunite Davis and Crawford, but the latter withdrew allegedly due to illness soon after filming began. She was replaced by Olivia de Havilland. The film was a considerable success, and brought renewed attention to its veteran cast, which included Joseph Cotten, Mary Astor, Agnes Moorehead, and Cecil Kellaway.

The following year, Davis was cast as the lead in an Aaron Spelling sitcom, The Decorator. A pilot episode was filmed, but was not shown, and the project was terminated. By the end of the decade, Davis had appeared in the British films The Nanny (1965), The Anniversary (1968), and Connecting Rooms (1970), none of which were reviewed well, and her career again stalled.

=== 1971–1983: Later career ===
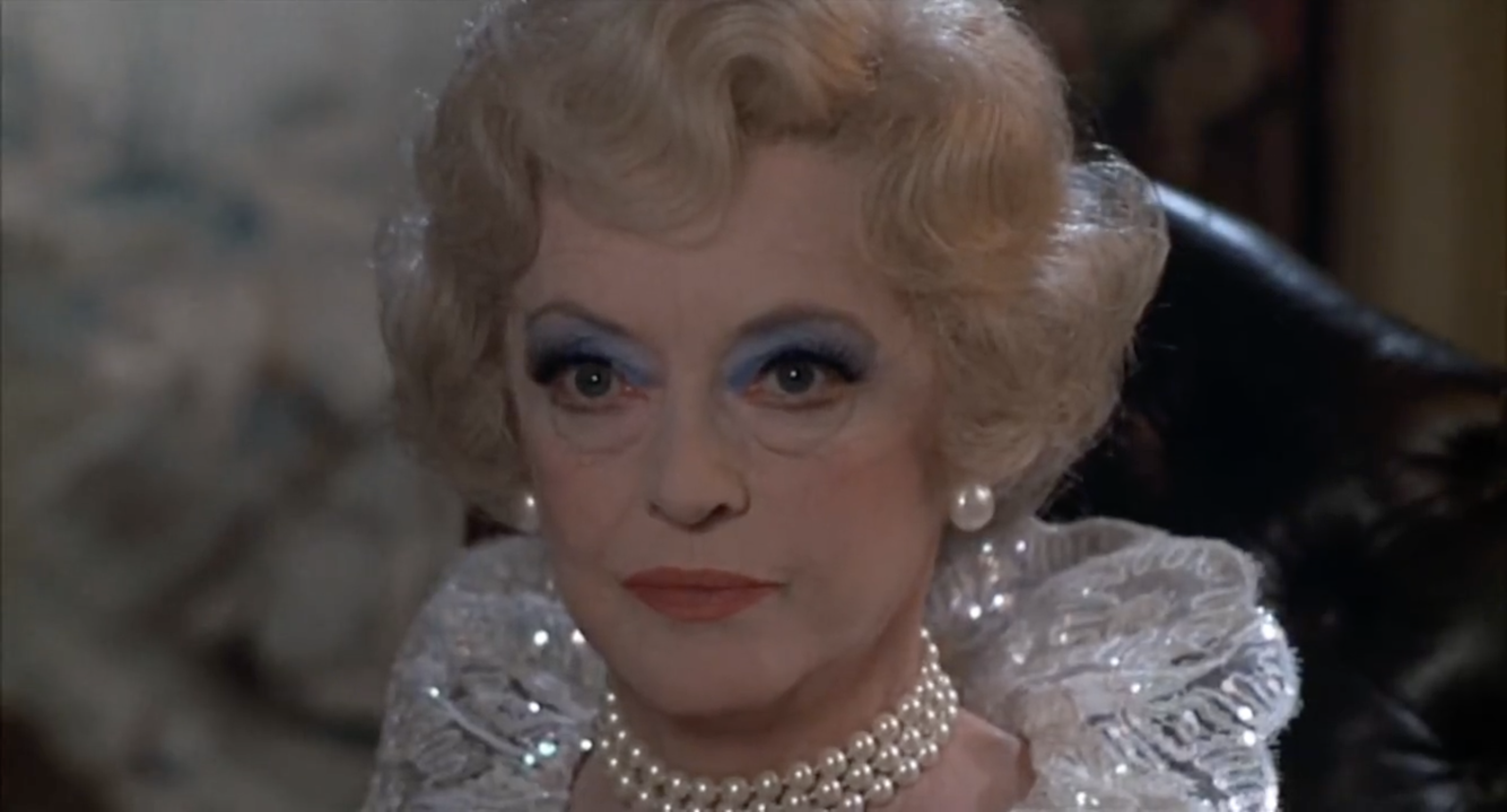
Davis in The Scientific Cardplayer (1972)

In the early 1970s, Davis was invited to appear in New York City in a stage presentation titled Great Ladies of the American Cinema. Over five successive nights, a different female star discussed her career, and answered questions from the audience; Myrna Loy, Rosalind Russell, Lana Turner, Sylvia Sidney, and Joan Crawford were the other participants. Davis was well-received, and was invited to tour Australia with the similarly themed Bette Davis in Person and on Film; its success allowed her to take the production to the United Kingdom.

In 1972, Davis played the lead role in two television films that were each intended as pilots for upcoming series for ABC and NBC, Madame Sin, with Robert Wagner, and The Judge and Jake Wyler, with Doug McClure and Joan Van Ark, but in each case, the network decided against producing a series.

She appeared in the stage production Miss Moffat, a musical adaptation of her film The Corn Is Green, but after the show was panned by the Philadelphia critics during its pre-Broadway run, she cited a back injury, and abandoned the show, which closed immediately.

She played supporting roles in Luigi Comencini's Lo Scopone scientifico (1972) with Joseph Cotten and Italian actors Alberto Sordi and Silvana Mangano; Burnt Offerings (1976), a Dan Curtis film, for which she won the award for Best Supporting Actress at the Saturn Awards; and The Disappearance of Aimee (1976); but she clashed with Karen Black and Faye Dunaway, the stars of the two latter productions, because she felt that neither extended her an appropriate degree of respect and that their behavior on the film sets was unprofessional.

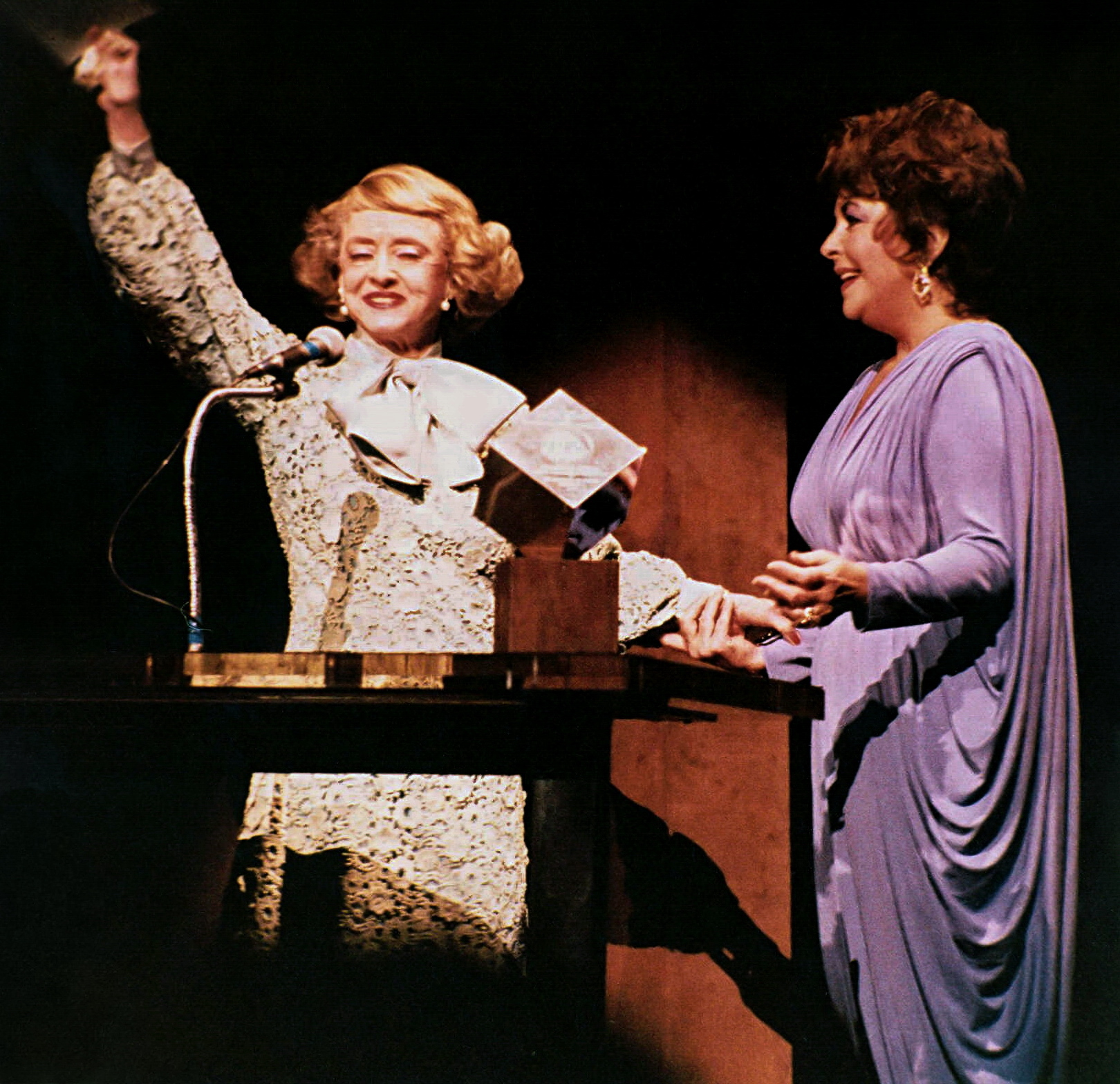
Davis (left) and Elizabeth Taylor in late 1981 during a show celebrating Taylor's life

In 1977, Davis became the first woman to receive the American Film Institute's Lifetime Achievement Award. The televised event included comments from several of Davis's colleagues, including William Wyler, who joked that given the chance, Davis would still like to re-film a scene from The Letter to which Davis nodded. Jane Fonda, Henry Fonda, Natalie Wood, and Olivia de Havilland were among the performers who paid tribute, with de Havilland commenting that Davis "got the roles I always wanted". That same year, Davis's lifelong rival Joan Crawford died. Davis reportedly stated, "You should never say bad things about the dead; you should only say good... Joan Crawford is dead. Good."

Following the telecast, she found herself in demand again, often having to choose between several offers. She accepted roles in the television miniseries The Dark Secret of Harvest Home (1978) and the theatrical film Death on the Nile (1978), an Agatha Christie murder mystery. The bulk of her remaining work was for television. She won an Emmy Award for Strangers: The Story of a Mother and Daughter (1979) with Gena Rowlands, and was nominated for her performances in White Mama (1980) and Little Gloria...Happy at Last (1982). She also played supporting roles in the Disney films Return from Witch Mountain (1978) and The Watcher in the Woods (1980).

Davis's name became well known to a younger audience when Kim Carnes's song "Bette Davis Eyes" (written by Donna Weiss and Jackie DeShannon) became a worldwide hit and the best-selling record of 1981 in the U.S., where it stayed at number one on the music charts for more than two months. Davis's grandson was impressed that she was the subject of a hit song and Davis considered it a compliment, writing to both Carnes and the songwriters, and accepting the gift of gold and platinum records from Carnes, and hanging them on her wall.

She continued acting for television, appearing in Family Reunion (1981) with her grandson J. Ashley Hyman, A Piano for Mrs. Cimino (1982), for which she won the Best Actress Award at The Monte Carlo Television Festival, and Right of Way (1983) with James Stewart. In 1983, she was awarded the Women in Film Crystal Award.

=== 1983–1985: Illness and My Mother's Keeper ===
Her career went through several periods of eclipse, but despite a long period of ill health she continued acting in film and on television until shortly before her death from breast cancer in 1989. She admitted that her success had often been at the expense of her personal relationships.

In 1983, after filming the pilot episode for the television series Hotel, Davis was diagnosed with breast cancer and underwent a mastectomy. Within two weeks of her surgery, she had four strokes which caused paralysis in the left side of her face and in her left arm, and left her with slurred speech. She commenced a lengthy period of physical therapy, and aided by her personal assistant Kathryn Sermak gained partial recovery from the paralysis. Even late in life, Davis smoked 100 cigarettes per day.

==== My Mother's Keeper ====
In 1978, Davis's longtime rival Joan Crawford's daughter Christina published a memoir titled Mommie Dearest, claiming Crawford was an emotionally manipulative alcoholic who abused her children. Davis defended Crawford, saying, "I was not Miss Crawford's biggest fan but, wisecracks to the contrary, I did and still do respect her talent. What she did not deserve was that detestable book written by her daughter...imagine how I would feel if my own beloved, wonderful daughter, B.D., were to write a bad book about me."

During this time, her relationship with Hyman deteriorated when Hyman became a born-again Christian and attempted to persuade Davis to follow suit. With her health stable, she traveled to England to film the Agatha Christie mystery Murder with Mirrors (1985). Upon her return, she learned that Hyman had published My Mother's Keeper, in which she chronicled a difficult mother-daughter relationship and depicted scenes of Davis's overbearing and drunken behavior.

Several of Davis's friends commented that Hyman's depiction of events was not accurate; one said, "So much of the book is out of context". Mike Wallace re-broadcast a 60 Minutes interview he had filmed with Hyman a few years earlier in which she commended Davis on her skills as a mother and said that she had adopted many of Davis's principles in raising her own children.

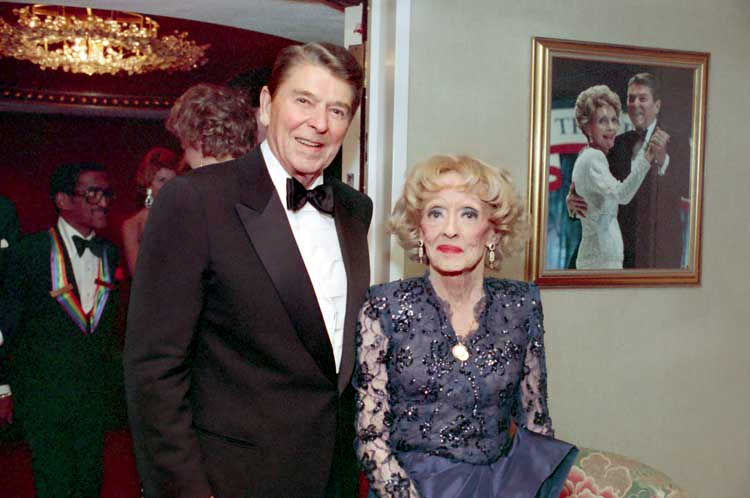
Davis with President Ronald Reagan, her co-star in 1939's Dark Victory, in 1987, two years before her death

Critics of Hyman noted that Davis financially supported the Hyman family for several years and had recently saved them from losing their house. Despite the acrimony of their divorce years earlier, Gary Merrill also defended Davis. Interviewed by CNN, Merrill said that Hyman was motivated by "cruelty and greed". Davis's adopted son Michael Merrill ended contact with Hyman, and refused to speak to her again, as did Davis, who disinherited her.

In her second memoir This 'n That (1987), Davis wrote: "I am still recovering from the fact that a child of mine would write about me behind my back, to say nothing about the kind of book it is. I will never recover as completely from B.D.'s book as I have from the stroke. Both were shattering experiences." Her memoir concluded with a letter to her daughter, in which she addressed her several times as Hyman, and described her actions as "a glaring lack of loyalty and thanks for the very privileged life I feel you have been given". She concluded with a reference to the title of Hyman's book, "If it refers to money, if my memory serves me right, I've been your keeper all these many years. I am continuing to do so, as my name has made your book about me a success."

=== 1986–1989: Final works and awards ===
Davis, aged 79, completed her penultimate role in The Whales of August (1987), which brought her acclaim during a period in which she was beset with failing health and personal trauma.

Davis appeared in the television film As Summers Die (1986), and in Lindsay Anderson's film The Whales of August (1987), in which she played the blind sister of Lillian Gish. Though in poor health at the time, Davis memorized her own and everyone else's lines as she always had. The film earned good reviews, with one critic writing: "Bette crawls across the screen like a testy old hornet on a windowpane, snarling, staggering, twitching – a symphony of misfired synapses." Davis became an honoree of the Kennedy Center Honors for her contribution to films in 1987.

Her last performance was the title role in Larry Cohen's Wicked Stepmother (1989). By this time, her health was failing, and after disagreements with Cohen, she walked off the set. The script was rewritten to place more emphasis on Barbara Carrera's character, and the reworked version was released after Davis's death.

After abandoning Wicked Stepmother, and with no further film offers (though she was keen to play the centenarian in Craig Calman's The Turn of the Century, and worked with him on adapting the stage play to a feature-length screenplay), Davis appeared on several talk shows, and was interviewed by Johnny Carson, Joan Rivers, Larry King, and David Letterman, discussing her career, but refusing to discuss her daughter. Her appearances were popular; Lindsay Anderson observed that the public enjoyed seeing her behaving "so bitchy": "I always disliked that because she was encouraged to behave badly. And I'd always hear her described by that awful word, feisty."

During 1988 and 1989, Davis was honored for her career achievements, receiving the Legion of Honor from France, the Campione d'Italia from Italy, and the Film Society of Lincoln Center Lifetime Achievement Award. She appeared on British television in a special broadcast from the South Bank Centre, discussing film and her career.

=== Death ===
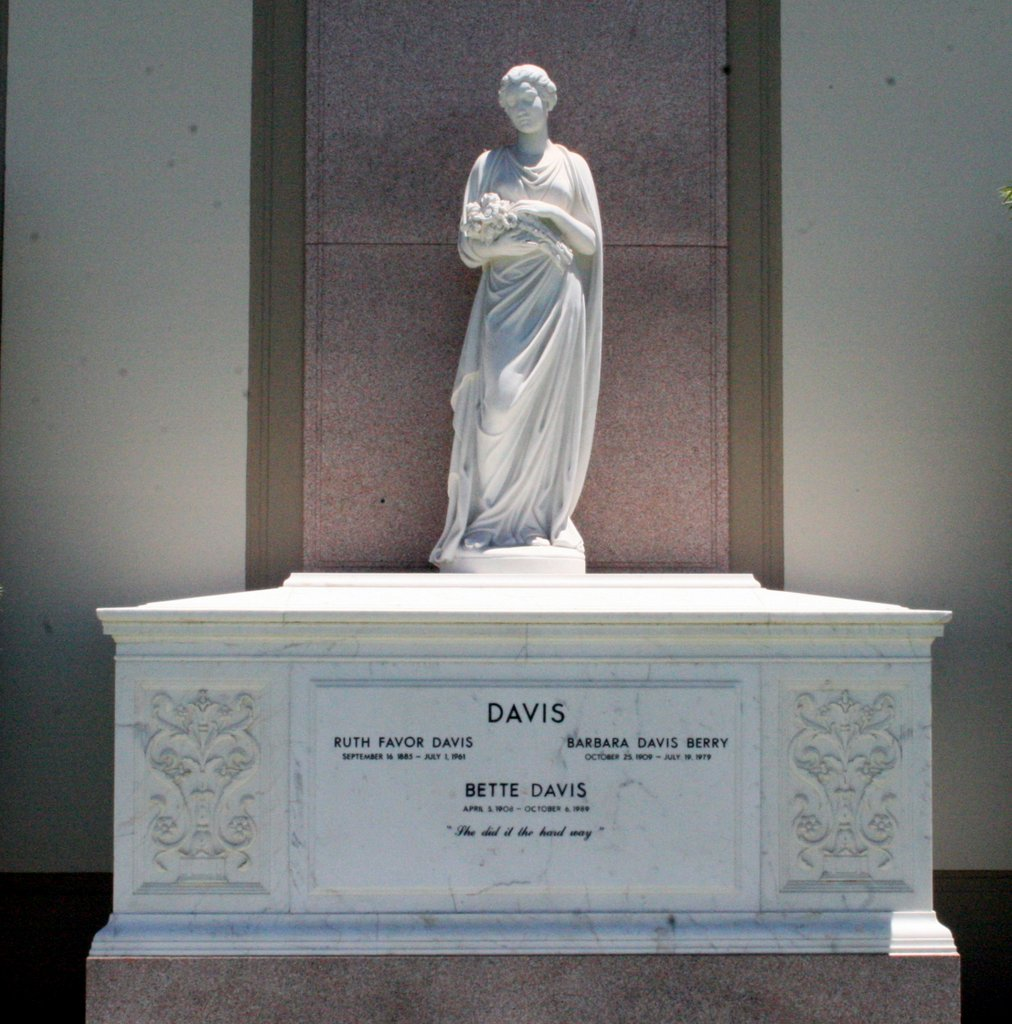
Davis's crypt at Forest Lawn Memorial Park in Los Angeles

Davis collapsed during the American Cinema Awards ceremony in 1989 and later discovered that her cancer had returned. She recovered sufficiently to travel to Spain, where she was honored at the San Sebastián International Film Festival. During her visit, her health rapidly deteriorated. Too weak to make the long journey back to the U.S., she traveled to France, where she died of metastasized breast cancer on October 6, 1989, at the American Hospital in Neuilly-sur-Seine. Davis was 81 years old. A memorial tribute was held by invitation only at Burbank Studio's stage 18, where a work light was turned on signaling the end of production.

A private funeral was held on October 12, 1989, held at First Christian Church of North Hollywood. Following the funeral, she was entombed in the Davis family sarcophagus at Forest Lawn-Hollywood Hills Cemetery in Los Angeles, alongside her mother Ruthie and sister Bobby, with her name in larger letters. On her tombstone is written: "She did it the hard way", an epitaph that she mentioned in her memoir Mother Goddam as having been suggested to her by Joseph L. Mankiewicz shortly after they had filmed All About Eve.

Her estate was valued between $600,000 and $1,000,000 at the time of her death. She left about half of the estate to her adopted son, Michael Merrill, and the other half to her assistant and close friend, Kathryn Sermack. Her adopted daughter Margot Merrill and daughter B. D. Hyman (along with Hyman's two sons) were excluded from her will. Davis and her daughter had been estranged ever since the latter published My Mother's Keeper in 1985. Margot died in 2022.

== Reception and legacy ==
=== Roles and performances ===
As early as 1936, Graham Greene summarized Davis:

Even the most inconsiderable film...seemed temporarily better than they were because of that precise, nervy voice, the pale ash-blond hair, the popping, neurotic eyes, a kind of corrupt and phosphorescent prettiness.... I would rather watch Miss Davis than any number of competent pictures.

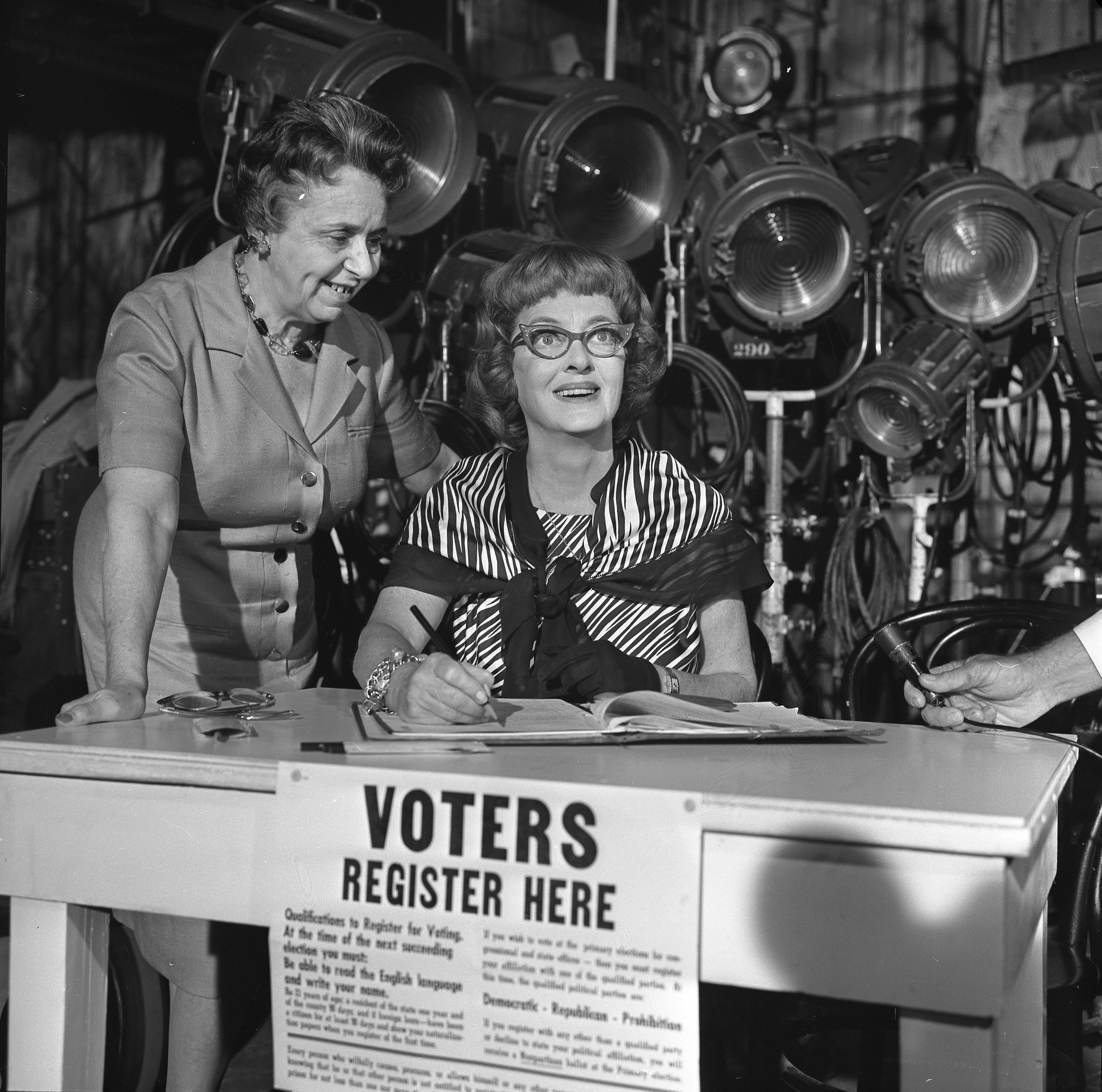
Davis registering to vote in 1964

Pauline Kael notes that Davis made herself lovable and famous by turning herself into "a caricature of a harpy."

In 1964, Jack Warner spoke of the "magic quality that transformed this sometimes bland and not beautiful little girl into a great artist", and in a 1988 interview, Davis remarked that, unlike many of her contemporaries, she had forged a career without the benefit of beauty. She admitted she was terrified during the making of her early films, and that she became tough by necessity. "Until you're known in my profession as a monster, you are not a star", she said, "[but] I've never fought for anything in a treacherous way. I've never fought for anything but the good of the film." During the making of All About Eve (1950), Joseph L. Mankiewicz told her of the perception in Hollywood that she was difficult, and she explained that when the audience saw her on screen, they did not consider that her appearance was the result of numerous people working behind the scenes. If she was presented as "a horse's ass...forty feet wide, and thirty feet high", that is all the audience "would see or care about".

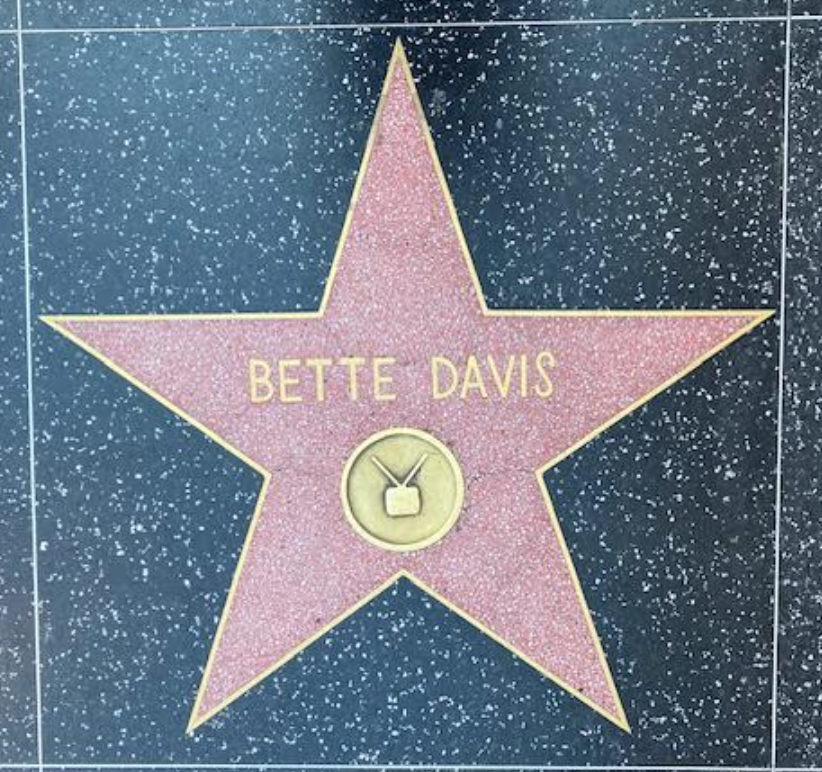
Davis's star on the Hollywood Walk of Fame for her achievements in television

While lauded for her achievements, Davis and her films were sometimes derided. Pauline Kael described Now, Voyager (1942) as a "shlock classic", and by the mid-1940s, her sometimes mannered and histrionic performances had become the subject of caricature. Edwin Schallert, for the Los Angeles Times, praised Davis's performance in Mr. Skeffington (1944), while observing, "The mimics will have more fun than a box of monkeys imitating Miss Davis". Dorothy Manners, at the Los Angeles Examiner, said of her performance in the poorly received Beyond the Forest (1949): "No night club caricaturist has ever turned in such a cruel imitation of the Davis mannerisms as Bette turns on herself in this one." Time magazine noted that Davis was compulsively watchable, even while criticizing her acting technique, summarizing her performance in Dead Ringer (1964) with the observation, "Her acting, as always, isn't really acting: It's shameless showing off. But just try to look away!"

Her film choices were often unconventional: Davis sought roles as manipulators and killers in an era when actresses usually preferred to play sympathetic characters, and she excelled in them. She favored authenticity over glamour, and was willing to change her own appearance if it suited the character.

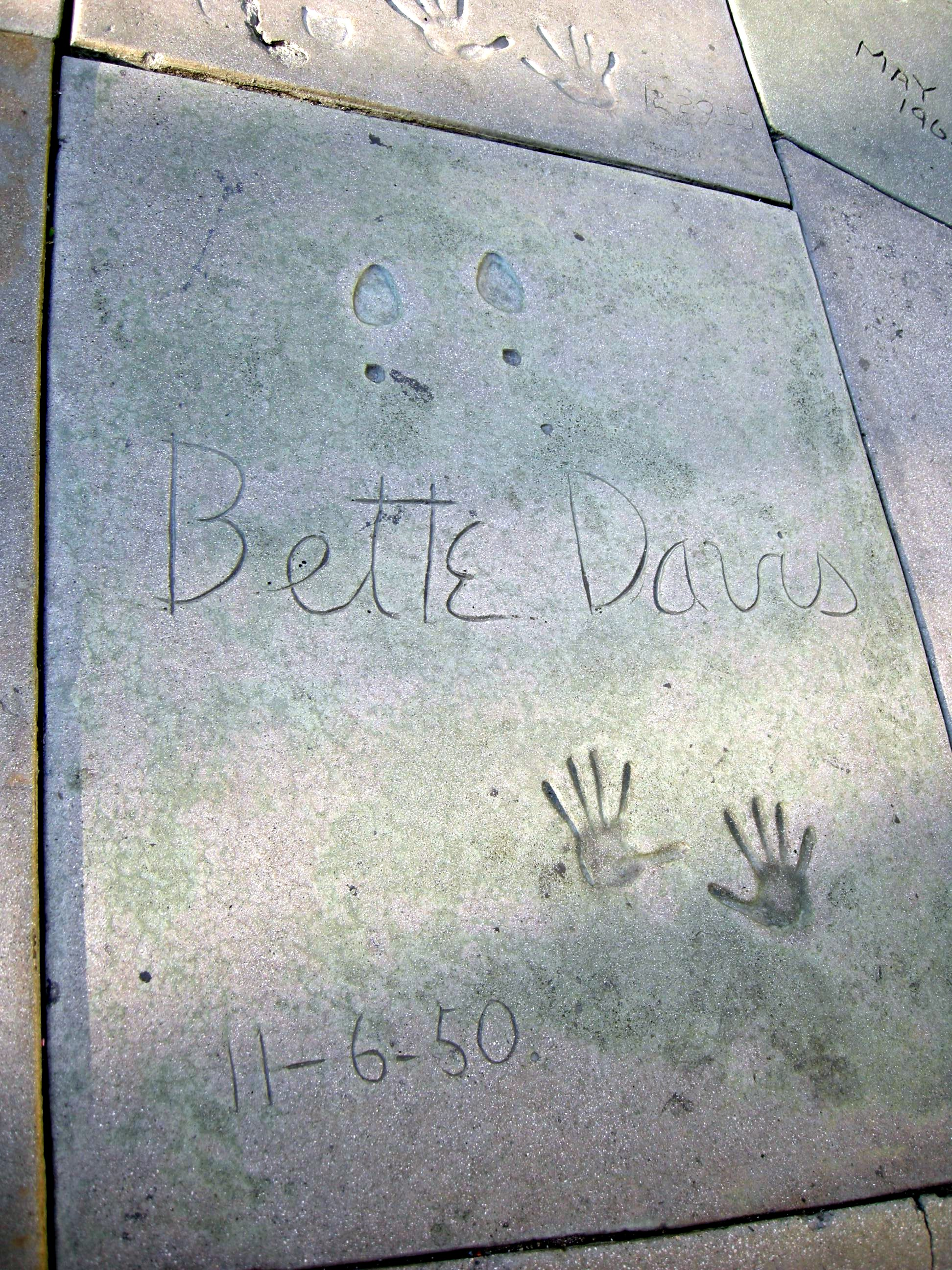
Davis's signature and handprints at Grauman's Chinese Theatre

As she entered old age, Davis was acknowledged for her achievements. John Springer, who had arranged her speaking tours of the early 1970s, wrote that despite the accomplishments of many of her contemporaries, Davis was "the star of the thirties and into the forties", achieving notability for the variety of her characterizations and her ability to assert herself, even when her material was mediocre. Individual performances continued to receive praise; in 1987, Bill Collins analyzed The Letter (1940), and described her performance as "a brilliant, subtle achievement", and wrote: "Bette Davis makes Leslie Crosbie one of the most extraordinary females in movies."

In a 2000 review for All About Eve (1950), Roger Ebert noted: "Davis was a character, an icon with a grand style; so, even her excesses are realistic." In 2006, Premiere magazine ranked her portrayal of Margo Channing in the film as fifth on their list of 100 Greatest Performances of All Time, commenting: "There is something deliciously audacious about her gleeful willingness to play such unattractive emotions as jealousy, bitterness, and neediness." While reviewing What Ever Happened to Baby Jane? (1962) in 2008, Ebert asserted that, "No one who has seen the film will ever forget her."

Davis said in 1973 that her performance in The Catered Affair (1956) was the most under-appreciated but the most self-satisfying of her career.

In 1977, Davis became the first woman to be honored with the AFI Life Achievement Award. In 1999, the American Film Institute published its list of the "AFI's 100 Years...100 Stars", which was the result of a film-industry poll to determine the "50 Greatest American Screen Legends" to raise public awareness and appreciation of classic film. Of the 25 actresses listed, Davis was ranked at number two, behind Katharine Hepburn.

=== Memorials ===
A few months before her death in 1989, Davis was one of several actors featured on the cover of Life magazine. In a film retrospective that celebrated the films and stars of 1939, Life concluded that Davis was the most significant actress of her era, and highlighted Dark Victory (1939) as one of the more important films of the year. Her death made front-page news throughout the world as the "close of yet another chapter of the Golden Age of Hollywood". Angela Lansbury summarized the feeling of those of the Hollywood community who attended her memorial service, commenting, after a sample from Davis's films was screened, that they had witnessed "an extraordinary legacy of acting in the twentieth century by a real master of the craft" that should provide "encouragement and illustration to future generations of aspiring actors".

The United States Postal Service honored Davis with a commemorative postage stamp in 2008, marking the 100th anniversary of her birth. The stamp features an image of her in the role of Margo Channing in All About Eve. The First Day of Issue celebration took place September 18, 2008, at Boston University, which houses an extensive Davis archive. Featured speakers included her son Michael Merrill and Lauren Bacall. In 1997, the executors of her estate, Merrill and Kathryn Sermak, her former assistant, established The Bette Davis Foundation, which awards college scholarships to promising actors and actresses.

In 2017, Sermak published the memoir Miss D & Me: Life With the Invincible Bette Davis, a book Davis had requested Sermak to write, detailing their years spent together.

=== In popular culture ===
- In 1981, the song "Bette Davis Eyes", performed by Kim Carnes, won two Grammy Awards (Song of the Year and Record of the Year) and spent a total of nine weeks at the top of the Billboard Hot 100. Davis wrote letters to Carnes and the writers of the song, Donna Weiss and Jackie DeShannon, to thank them for making her "a part of modern times", and said that her grandson now looked up to her. After their Grammy wins, Davis sent them roses.
- Other references to Davis are made in Bob Dylan's "Desolation Row", in the song "Celluloid Heroes" by the Kinks, in the 1990 Madonna song "Vogue", in "Silver Screen Romance" by American rock band Good Charlotte, and in "Girl on TV" by the boy band LFO. There is also the line "I don't know how you came to get the Bette Davis knees, but worst of all young man, you've got industrial disease" in the Dire Straits 1982 song "Industrial Disease".
- Davis attracted a following in the gay subculture, and was frequently imitated by female impersonators such as Arthur Blake and Charles Pierce. Attempting to explain her popularity with gay audiences, the journalist Jim Emerson wrote: "Was she just a camp figurehead because her brittle, melodramatic style of acting hadn't aged well? Or was it that she was 'Larger Than Life', a tough broad who had survived? Probably some of both."
- In House of Wax (2005), in her attempt to blend in with the other wax figures in the local movie house, the lead female character has to sit through a scene from Whatever Happened to Baby Jane .
- The alleged feud between Davis and Joan Crawford is the subject of the 1989 book Bette and Joan: The Divine Feud. It was later depicted in the 2017 television series Feud: Bette and Joan, with Susan Sarandon as Davis and Jessica Lange as Crawford.
- The Bette Davis Picnic Area is in Griffith Park in Los Angeles. It was named after Davis because she once lived in one of the homes along Rancho Avenue, across the street from the park.
- Queen Bette, a one-woman show about the life of Davis, produced by G.bod Theatre, was performed throughout Australia and in London between 2015 and 2024, with Jeanette Cronin receiving positive reviews for her portrayal of the star.

== Academy Awards ==
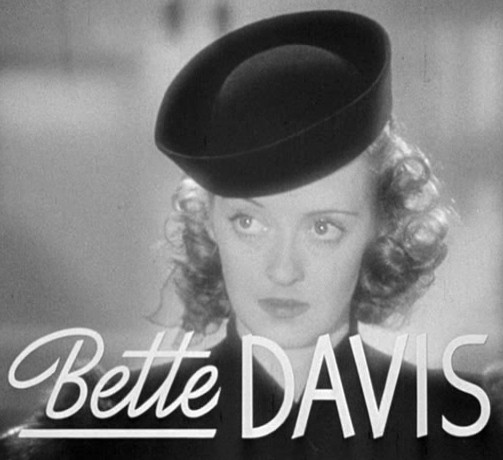
Davis in the trailer for Dark Victory (1939), in which she gave one of her 11 Oscar-nominated performances

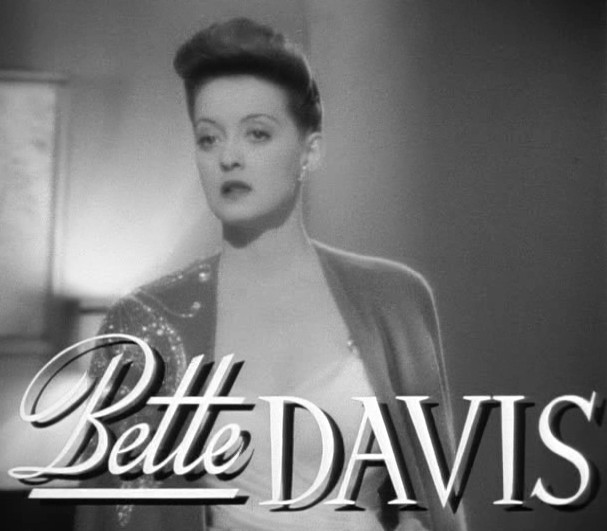
Davis in the trailer for Now, Voyager (1942)

Davis established several Oscar milestones. Among them, she became the first person to earn five consecutive Academy Award nominations for acting, all in the Best Actress category (1938–1942). Her record has only been matched by one other performer, Greer Garson, who also earned five consecutive nominations in the Best Actress category (1941–1945), including three years when both these actresses were nominated.

In 1962, Bette Davis became the first person to secure 10 Academy Award nominations for acting. One could argue her 10th nomination was in 1952, and her 11th in 1962, as her write-in nomination for "Of Human Bondage" remains a source of contention. She came in 3rd in the voting, ahead of official nominee Grace Moore. Since then, only three people have surpassed this figure—Meryl Streep (with 21 nominations and three wins), Katharine Hepburn (12 nominations and 4 wins), and Jack Nicholson (12 nominations and 3 wins)—while Laurence Olivier matched her (10 nominations and 1 win).

Steven Spielberg purchased Davis's Oscars for Dangerous (1935) and Jezebel (1938), when they were offered for auction for $207,500 and $578,000, respectively, and returned them to the Academy of Motion Picture Arts and Sciences.

Year	Category	Film	Result
1934	Best Actress	Of Human Bondage	Nominated (Write-in)
1935	Best Actress	Dangerous	Won
1938	Best Actress	Jezebel	Won
1939	Best Actress	Dark Victory	Nominated
1940	Best Actress	The Letter	Nominated
1941	Best Actress	The Little Foxes	Nominated
1942	Best Actress	Now, Voyager	Nominated
1944	Best Actress	Mr. Skeffington	Nominated
1950	Best Actress	All About Eve	Nominated
1952	Best Actress	The Star	Nominated
1962	Best Actress	What Ever Happened to Baby Jane?	Nominated

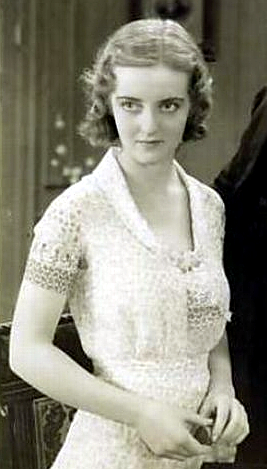
Davis in Bad Sister, her 1931 film debut

== Selected filmography ==
- Bad Sister (1931, debut)
- 20,000 Years in Sing Sing (1932)
- The Man Who Played God (1932)
- So Big! (1932)
- Three on a Match (1932)
- Of Human Bondage (1934)
- Bordertown (1935)
- Dangerous (1935)
- The Petrified Forest (1936)
- Marked Woman (1937)
- Jezebel (1938)
- Dark Victory (1939)
- Juarez (1939)
- The Old Maid (1939)
- The Private Lives of Elizabeth and Essex (1939)
- All This, and Heaven Too (1940)
- The Letter (1940)
- The Great Lie (1941)
- The Little Foxes (1941)
- The Man Who Came to Dinner (1941)
- Now, Voyager (1942)
- Old Acquaintance (1943)
- Watch on the Rhine (1943)
- Mr. Skeffington (1944)
- The Corn Is Green (1945)
- Deception (1946)
- A Stolen Life (1946)
- June Bride (1948)
- Beyond the Forest (1949)
- All About Eve (1950)
- Another Man's Poison (1951)
- Payment on Demand (1951)
- The Star (1952)
- The Catered Affair (1956)
- Storm Center (1956)
- Pocketful of Miracles (1961)
- What Ever Happened to Baby Jane? (1962)
- Dead Ringer (1964)
- Hush...Hush, Sweet Charlotte (1964)
- The Nanny (1965)
- The Anniversary (1968)
- Connecting Rooms (1970)
- Burnt Offerings (1976)
- Death on the Nile (1978)
- The Watcher in the Woods (1980)
- White Mama (1980~TV)
- Little Gloria... Happy at Last (1982~TV)
- A Piano for Mrs. Cimino (1982~TV)
- The Whales of August (1987)
- Wicked Stepmother (1989, final role)

== See also ==
- Classical Hollywood cinema
- List of awards and nominations received by Bette Davis
- List of people from Maine
- Motion Picture Production Code (Hays Code)

== Bibliography ==
- Bret, David (2006). Joan Crawford: Hollywood Martyr. Carroll & Graf Publishers. ISBN 978-0-7867-1868-9.
- Carr, Larry (1979). More Fabulous Faces: The Evolution and Metamorphosis of Bette Davis, Katharine Hepburn, Dolores del Río, Carole Lombard and Myrna Loy. Doubleday and Company. ISBN 0-385-12819-3.
- Chandler, Charlotte (2006). The Girl Who Walked Home Alone: Bette Davis, A Personal Biography. Simon and Schuster. ISBN 978-0-7432-6208-8.
- Collins, Bill (1987). Bill Collins Presents "The Golden Years of Hollywood". The MacMillan Company of Australia. ISBN 0-333-45069-8.
- Considine, Shaun (2000). Bette and Joan: The Divine Feud. Backinprint.com. ISBN 978-0-595-12027-7.
- Davis, Bette (1990) [1962]. The Lonely Life: An Autobiography. New York: G. P. Putnam's Sons. ISBN 978-0-425-12350-8. OCLC 387221.
- Davis, Bette; Herskowitz, Michael (1987). This 'N That. G. P. Putnam's Sons. ISBN 0-345-34453-7.
- Guiles, Fred Lawrence (1995). Joan Crawford, The Last Word. Conrad Goulden Books. ISBN 1-85793-268-4.
- Haver, Ronald (1980). David O. Selznick's Hollywood. Bonanza Books. ISBN 0-517-47665-7.
- Kael, Pauline (1982). 5001 Nights at the Movies. Zenith Books. ISBN 0-09-933550-6.
- Ringgold, Gene (1966). The Films of Bette Davis. Cadillac Publishing Co. ISBN 0-8065-0953-8.
- Sermak, Kathryn (2017). Miss D. and me: Life with the Invincible Bette Davis. Hachette Books. ISBN 978-0316507844.
- Shipman, David (1988). Movie Talk. St. Martin's Press. ISBN 0-312-03403-2.
- Sikov, Ed (2007). Dark Victory: The Life of Bette Davis. Henry Holt and Company. ISBN 978-0-8050-7548-9.
- Spada, James (1993). More Than a Woman: An Intimate Biography of Bette Davis. Little, Brown and Company. ISBN 0-316-90880-0.
- Sperling, Cass Warner; Milner, Cork Milner; Warner, Jack Jr. (1998). Hollywood Be Thy Name: The Warner Brothers Story. Prima Publishing. ISBN 0-8131-0958-2.
- Springer, John; Hamilton, Jack (1978). They Had Faces Then. Citadel Press. ISBN 0-8065-0657-1.
- Staggs, Sam (2000). All About "All About Eve". St. Martin's Press. ISBN 0-312-27315-0.
- Stine, Whitney; Davis, Bette (1974). Mother Goddam: The Story of the Career of Bette Davis. W.H. Allen and Co. Plc. ISBN 1-56980-157-6.
- Wiley, Mason; Bona, Damien (1987). Inside Oscar: The Unofficial History of the Academy Awards. Ballantine Books. ISBN 0-345-34453-7.
- Zeruk, James (2014). Peg Entwistle and the Hollywood Sign Suicide: A Biography. McFarland & Co. ISBN 978-0-7864-7313-7.

Non-profit organization positions
Preceded by Walter Wanger	President of the Academy of Motion Picture Arts and Sciences; 1941	Succeeded by Walter Wanger
