= B. D. Hyman =

American author and pastor (born 1947)

- Born: Barbara Davis Sherry; May 1, 1947 (age 79); Santa Ana, California, U.S.
- Occupations: Writer, minister
- Spouse: Jeremy Hyman (m. 1963; died 2017)
- Children: 2
- Parent: Bette Davis (mother)

Barbara Davis Hyman (née Sherry; born May 1, 1947) is an American author and pastor, the first child of film star Bette Davis.

== Early life ==
Born May 1, 1947, in Santa Ana, California, she is the daughter of Davis and artist William Grant Sherry (1914–1995), Bette Davis's third husband. Davis and Sherry divorced in 1950. As an infant, B. D. appeared briefly in her mother's film Payment on Demand (1951). Subsequently adopted by actor Gary Merrill, Davis's fourth husband, she was credited as B. D. Merrill for a minor role in What Ever Happened to Baby Jane? (1962), as the neighbor's daughter.

== Marriage ==
B. D. met Jeremy Hyman (b. 1933 in London), the British nephew of Seven Arts Productions owner Eliot Hyman, on a blind date for the screening of Baby Jane at the Cannes Film Festival in 1963. The couple married when B. D. was age 16 and Jeremy was 29 with her mother's consent and public support of their marriage. The couple remained married for over 50 years until Jeremy's death in November 2017. They have two sons, Ashley and Justin.

== Books ==
Hyman wrote two books highly critical of her mother, My Mother's Keeper (1985) and Narrow Is the Way (1987). My Mother's Keeper brought Hyman considerable condemnation for the timing of its publication since Davis was in ill health after suffering a stroke during the book's publication process, although the writing of the book had been completed well beforehand. My Mother's Keeper chronicled a difficult mother–daughter relationship and depicted scenes of her mother as an overbearing alcoholic.

Mike Wallace rebroadcast a 60 Minutes interview he had filmed with Hyman a few years earlier in which she commended Davis on her skills as a mother when she (Hyman) was younger, and said that she had adopted many of Davis's principles in raising her own children. My Mother's Keeper was a best-seller; the second book, however, did not generate the same level of interest.

Despite the acrimony of their divorce years earlier, Davis's former husband, Gary Merrill, defended Davis and claimed in an interview with CNN that B. D. was motivated by "cruelty and greed". B. D.'s brother through adoption, Michael Merrill, ended contact with B. D., and refused to speak to her again. Bette Davis disinherited B. D. and her grandchildren; her estate was instead divided between her adopted son Michael Merrill and her assistant Kathryn Sermak.

== Ministry ==
A born-again Christian, Hyman is the head of her own ministry and pastor of her church in Charlottesville, Virginia. She has written three books which were published by her ministry: Oppressive Parents: How to Leave Them and Love Them (1992), The Church is Not the Bride (2000), and The Rapture, the Tribulation, and Beyond (2002).

== In popular culture ==
Kiernan Shipka portrays a young Hyman in the FX anthology television series Feud (2017), which chronicles the rivalry between her mother Bette Davis and Joan Crawford during the production of their 1962 film What Ever Happened to Baby Jane?

Nora Dunn played Hyman in a 1989 Saturday Night Live sketch, where she views her mother's (Jan Hooks) posthumous video will.

== Filmography ==
| Year | Title | Role | Notes |
|---|---|---|---|
| 1951 | Payment on Demand | Diana as a Child | |
| 1962 | What Ever Happened to Baby Jane? | Liza Bates | |
