= Payment on Demand =

1951 American drama film by Curtis Bernhardt

- Australian daybill poster
- Directed by: Curtis Bernhardt
- Written by: Curtis Bernhardt; Bruce Manning
- Produced by: Jack H. Skirball; Bruce Manning
- Starring: Bette Davis; Barry Sullivan; Jane Cowl; Kent Taylor; Betty Lynn; Frances Dee
- Cinematography: Leo Tover
- Edited by: Harry Marker
- Music by: Victor Young
- Production company: RKO Pictures
- Distributed by: RKO Pictures
- Release date: February 15, 1951 (New York)
- Running time: 90 minutes
- Country: United States
- Language: English
- Box office: $1.6 million (U.S. rentals)

Payment on Demand is a 1951 American drama film directed by Curtis Bernhardt and starring Bette Davis and Barry Sullivan. The screenplay by Bernhardt and Bruce Manning chronicles a marriage from its idealistic early days to its dissolution.

== Plot ==
San Francisco socialite Joyce Ramsey is concerned about her daughter Martha's boyfriend Phil’s working-class background. Joyce is accustomed to controlling her surroundings to maintain the position, family and success that she and David have built. David is unhappy and stuns Joyce when he requests a divorce. He tells her that he is leaving that night, prompting her to reflect on their marriage.

In a flashback, David is a struggling Santa Rosa attorney working on construction jobs with his law partner Bob Townsend, while Joyce serves as their secretary. When a prospective client named Swanson, who has a potentially lucrative steel-fabrication method, requests to see Bob, Joyce lies, telling Swanson that it is David who knows patent law. When Bob learns of Joyce's deception, he angrily leaves the firm. David is furious with Joyce, who maintains that her sole intent was to help him and their newborn child. David promises to find a way to make amends with Bob.

In the present, Joyce reveals to her stunned daughters that their father has left her. At a luncheon engagement, she learns that David has been seen with another woman. She visits lawyer Ted Prescott and hires a private detective to investigate. Prescott warns her not to discuss her suspicions with anyone.

In another flashback, David takes Joyce to the hospital for the birth of their second child. David, now an executive at Swanson's company, announces that he has been transferred to San Francisco but wants to buy a small farm within driving distance. Joyce, longing for the excitement of city living, changes his mind. She meets fellow social climber Emily Hedges and they become close friends.

A more recent flashback reveals Bob, in desperate need of $15,000, arriving at the Ramsey home to request a loan. He had refused David’s offers of help for 20 years but needs him now. Joyce tells him that David is away on business and that she is unable to help him. When David learns of her lie and helps Bob, Joyce is furious.

In the present, Joyce's detective photographs David with his mistress Eileen. David asks Eileen to marry him to save her reputation, but she refuses. During a settlement meeting, Joyce insists that David fund trusts for their daughters, rejecting the idea that her daughter Dee’s marriage will provide security for her. She refuses David’s promise of support payments, arguing that they must become part of the trusts. When Joyce rejects David’s offer of half of everything he owns, both lawyers are shocked because David is offering more than any court would award to her. She demands all of David's assets, threatening to sue him and publicly reveal his infidelity if he refuses to comply with her request. David is appalled but complies with Joyce's demands and instructs his lawyer to award her whatever she requests. Martha chooses to live with Joyce, who needs her more.

While on vacation, Joyce meets Englishman Anthony Tunliffe and visits Emily in Port-au-Prince, Haiti. Emily, divorced, disillusioned and alcoholic, lives with a gigolo and expresses concern for Joyce's future. When Joyce learns that Anthony is married and simply seeking an extramarital affair, she leaves him and returns home.

At Martha and Phil's wedding, Joyce and David meet, but they sit at opposite ends of the table. Later in a taxi, Joyce confides to David that she is lonely and had not realized how much she had been a part of him. He suggests that they start anew. Although she wants nothing more than to be reunited with him, she fears that he is acting out of pity. She asks him to delay his decision until he is sure, however long that may take.

== Cast ==
- Bette Davis as Joyce Ramsey
- Barry Sullivan as David Ramsey
- Jane Cowl as Emily Hedges
- Kent Taylor as Robert Townsend
- Betty Lynn as Martha Ramsey
- John Sutton as Anthony Tunliffe
- Frances Dee as Eileen Benson
- Peggie Castle as Diana Ramsey
- Otto Kruger as Ted Prescott
- Walter Sande as Swanson
- Brett King as Phil Polanski
- Richard Anderson as Jim Boland
- Natalie Schafer as Mrs. Edna Blanton
- Katherine Emery as Mrs. Gates
- Lisa Golm as Molly
- Harry Tenbrook as Taxi Driver (uncredited)

== Production ==
The film, originally titled The Story of a Divorce, is Bette Davis' first film after the end of her contract with Warner Bros.

The original script reunited Joyce and David at the end, with Joyce still an overly ambitious wife determined to dominate her husband and steer his career path. RKO Pictures owner Howard Hughes, who had retitled the film Payment on Demand in December 1950, was unhappy with the film's ending and recalled director Curtis Bernhardt and the two leads to the studio just two days before the film was scheduled to open at Radio City Music Hall in New York City in order to film his revision to the script. The scene was processed, spliced into the final reel and flown to New York on a Hughes-owned TWA aircraft, arriving at the theater after the film already had begun under its original title. The projectionist had just enough time to thread his machine with the new final reel. Davis later said: "The new ending broke our hearts. The one we had shot was the true ending for our film. We also were brokenhearted over the title change." However, Hollywood gossip columnist Erskine Johnson reported that Davis had requested the title change, concerned that audiences would confuse the original title with her own divorces.

Production began in February 1950 and was completed in 34 days, eight days ahead of schedule, which saved the producers approximately $150,000.

The film marks Jane Cowl's final screen appearance, as she died on June 22, 1950.

== Release ==
Although production had wrapped in early April 1950, the film's release was held for several months in order to avoid conflicts with Davis' All About Eve, released in October 1950, particularly during the period of voting for the Academy Awards.

The film premiered at Radio City Music Hall in New York on February 15, 1951 along with a lavish stage show featuring songs by Arthur Rubin and June Winters, circus acts by Cilly Feindt and performances by acrobats, ballet dancers and the Rockettes.

== Reception ==
In a contemporary review for The New York Times, critic Bosley Crowther wrote: "Miss Davis performs most capably, achieving a surface appearance of feminine churlishness that might almost be real. Likewise, the luscious surroundings in which R. K. O. has arranged for her to perform have, at least, the beguiling intimations of unlimited wealth and taste. But, unfortunately, the script by Bruce Manning and Curtis Bernhardt includes everything but a simple and convincing demonstration of the reasons why a marriage hasn't clicked. ... [T]his domestic drama, which Mr. Bernhardt has staged, is entirely a vehicle for Miss Davis to pull with a firm theatrical grip across the screen."

Critic Edwin Schallert of the Los Angeles Times wrote: "Bette Davis puts forth one of her finest screen efforts in 'Payment on Demand,' a picture which more aptly fulfills its original title, 'The Story of a Divorce..' A sympathetic study of a woman's position when she seeks a legal separation from her husband in middle life, this film ... has many excellent attributes. ... Miss Davis has to change character frequently during these episodes and gives an excellent account of herself in their tempestuous moments, which makes a fine contrast to her later more restrained scenes. This is no such flashy performance as she gave in 'All About Eve.' It is much finer grained."

== See also ==
1. List of American films of 1951
