= William Wyler filmography =

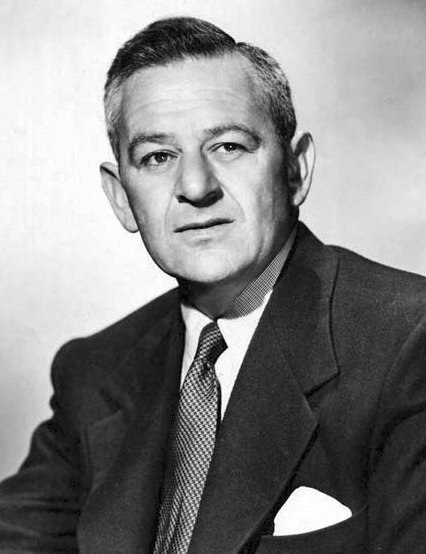
William Wyler circa 1945

William Wyler was a Swiss-German-American director and producer.

He is regarded as one of the most distinguished and versatile filmmakers for Classical Hollywood cinema, directing films during the silent era as well as the sound era, and in both black-and-white and technicolor film.

His most notable works include the war films Mrs. Miniver (1942), The Best Years of Our Lives (1946), and the biblical epic Ben-Hur (1959), all three went on to receive the Academy Award for Best Picture. He's also known for directing the drama Dodsworth (1936) with Walter Huston, the drama Jezebel (1938) with Bette Davis, the romance Wuthering Heights (1939) starring Laurence Olivier, the period drama The Little Foxes (1941) starring Bette Davis, romance drama The Heiress (1949) starring Olivia de Havilland, the romantic comedy Roman Holiday (1953) starring Audrey Hepburn and Gregory Peck, the western epic The Big Country (1958) starring Peck and Charlton Heston, the heist comedy How to Steal a Million (1966) starring Hepburn and Peter O'Toole, and the musical epic Funny Girl (1968) starring Barbra Streisand.

== Filmography ==
=== Silent films ===
Year	Title	Studio	Genre	Notes
1925	The Crook Buster	Universal	Western	UMS*
1926	The Gunless Bad Man	Universal	Western	UMS
1926	Ridin' for Love	Universal	Western	UMS
1926	The Fire Barrier	Universal	Western	UMS
1926	Don't Shoot	Universal	Western	UMS
1926	The Pinnacle Rider	Universal	Western	UMS
1926	Martin of the Mounted	Universal	Western	UMS
1926	Lazy Lightning	Universal	Western	UBSS**
1926	The Stolen Ranch	Universal	Western	UBSS
1927	The Two Fister	Universal	Western	UMS
1927	Kelcy Gets His Man	Universal	Western	UMS
1927	Tenderfoot Courage	Universal	Western	UMS
1927	The Silent Partner	Universal	Western	UMS
1927	Blazing Days	Universal	Western	UBSS
1927	Straight Shootin'	Universal	Western	UBSS
1927	Galloping Justice	Universal	Western	UMS
1927	The Haunted Homestead	Universal	Western	UMS
1927	Hard Fists	Universal	Western	UBSS
1927	The Lone Star	Universal	Western	UMS
1927	The Ore Raiders	Universal	Western	UMS
1927	The Home Trail	Universal	Western	UMS
1927	Gun Justice	Universal	Western	UMS
1927	The Phantom Outlaw	Universal	Western	UMS
1927	The Square Shooter	Universal	Western	UMS
1927	The Horse Trader	Universal	Western	UMS
1927	Daze of the West	Universal	Western	UMS
1927	The Border Cavalier	Universal	Western	UBSS
1927	Desert Dust	Universal	Western	
1928	Thunder Riders	Universal	Western	
1928	Anybody Here Seen Kelly?	Universal	Comedy	
1929	The Shakedown	Universal	Drama	Part-Talking film
1929	The Love Trap	Universal	Comedy	Part-Talking film

* Universal's Mustang Series. Wyler made 21 two-reeler films for this series, all with a duration of 24 minutes.
** Universal's Blue Streak Series. Wyler made 6 five-reeler films for this series, all with a duration of an hour.

=== Sound films ===
Year	Title	Studio	Genre	Notes
1929	Hell's Heroes	Universal	Western	
1930	The Storm	Universal	Western	
1931	A House Divided	Universal		
1932	Tom Brown of Culver	Universal		
1933	Her First Mate	Universal		
1933	Counsellor at Law	Universal		
1934	Glamour	Universal		
1935	The Good Fairy	Universal		
1935	The Gay Deception	20th Century-Fox		
1936	These Three	Samuel Goldwyn / United Artists		
1936	Dodsworth	Samuel Goldwyn / United Artists		Nominated for Best Picture
1936	Come and Get It	Samuel Goldwyn / United Artists	Western	Replaced Howard Hawks after 42 days
1937	Dead End	Samuel Goldwyn / United Artists		Nominated for Best Picture
1938	Jezebel	Warner Bros.		Nominated for Best Picture
1939	Wuthering Heights	Samuel Goldwyn / United Artists		Nominated for Best Picture
1940	The Westerner	Samuel Goldwyn / United Artists	Western	
1940	The Letter	Warner Bros. First National		Nominated for Best Picture
1941	The Little Foxes	Samuel Goldwyn / RKO		Nominated for Best Picture
1942	Mrs. Miniver	MGM		Won Best Picture
1946	The Best Years of Our Lives	Samuel Goldwyn Co. / RKO		Won Best Picture
1949	The Heiress	Paramount		
1951	Detective Story	Paramount		
1952	Carrie	Paramount		
1953	Roman Holiday	Paramount		Nominated for Best Picture
1955	The Desperate Hours	Paramount		
1956	Friendly Persuasion	Allied Artists		Nominated for Best Picture DeLuxe Color film
1958	The Big Country	Anthony Productions / United Artists	Western	Technicolor film
1959	Ben-Hur	MGM		Won Best Picture Technicolor film
1961	The Children's Hour	Mirisch / United Artists		
1965	The Collector	Columbia		Technicolor film
1966	How to Steal a Million	20th Century-Fox		Technicolor film
1968	Funny Girl	Columbia / Rastar		Nominated for Best Picture Technicolor film
1970	The Liberation of L.B. Jones	Columbia		Technicolor film

References: Turner Classic Movies and Internet Movie Database

=== Documentaries ===
Year	Title	Studio	Notes
1944	The Memphis Belle	First Motion Picture Unit	documentary First Technicolor film
1947	Thunderbolt	United States Air Force	co-directed with John Sturges documentary / short film

== See also ==
- List of awards and nominations received by William Wyler
