= List of awards and nominations received by William Wyler =

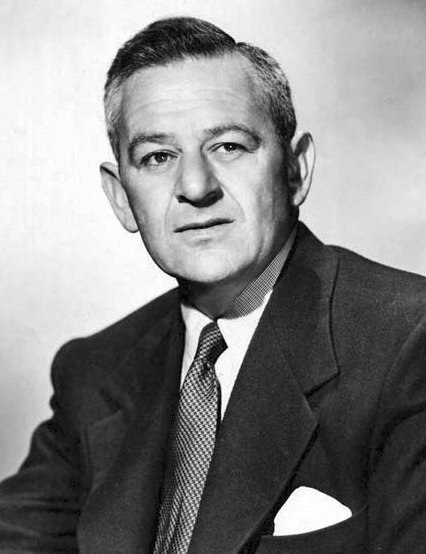
William Wyler publicity portrait

This article is a List of awards and nominations received by William Wyler

Known for his work in numerous genres over five decades he has received numerous award accolades including three Academy Awards. He holds a record twelve nominations for the Academy Award for Best Director. For his work Wyler was awarded the Irving G. Thalberg Memorial Award, the Directors Guild of America Lifetime Achievement Award, and the American Film Institute Life Achievement Award. Wyler went on to win the Academy Award for Best Director three times, those being for Mrs. Miniver (1942), The Best Years of Our Lives (1946), and Ben-Hur (1959), all of which also won for Best Picture. He was Oscar-nominated for Dodsworth (1936), Wuthering Heights (1939), The Letter (1940), The Little Foxes (1941), The Heiress (1949), Detective Story (1952), Roman Holiday (1953), Friendly Persuasion (1956), and The Collector (1965).

== Major associations ==
=== Academy Awards ===
Year	Category	Nominated work	Result	Ref.
1936	Best Director	Dodsworth	Nominated	
1939	Best Director	Wuthering Heights	Nominated	
1940	Best Director	The Letter	Nominated	
1941	Best Director	The Little Foxes	Nominated	
1942	Best Director	Mrs. Miniver	Won	
1946	Best Director	The Best Years of Our Lives	Won	
1949	Best Director	The Heiress	Nominated	
1951	Best Director	Detective Story	Nominated	
1953	Best Picture	Roman Holiday	Nominated	
1953	Best Director	Roman Holiday	Nominated	
1956	Best Picture	Friendly Persuasion	Nominated	
1956	Best Director	Friendly Persuasion	Nominated	
1959	Best Director	Ben-Hur	Won	
1965	Best Director	The Collector	Nominated	
1965	Irving G. Thalberg Memorial Award	—	Honored	

=== BAFTA Awards ===
Year	Category	Nominated work	Result	Ref.
British Academy Film Awards
1947	Best Film from Any Source	The Best Years of Our Lives	Won	
1951	Best Film from Any Source	Detective Story	Nominated	
1952	Best Film from Any Source	Carrie	Nominated	
1953	Best Film from Any Source	Roman Holiday	Nominated	
1959	Best Film from Any Source	Ben-Hur	Won	
1959	Best Film from Any Source	The Big Country	Nominated	

=== Golden Globe Awards ===
Year	Category	Nominated work	Result	Ref.
1959	Best Director	Ben-Hur	Won	
1961	Best Director	The Children's Hour	Nominated	
1965	Best Director	The Collector	Nominated	
1968	Best Director	Funny Girl	Nominated	

== Other awards ==
=== Cannes Film Festival ===
Year	Category	Nominated work	Result	Ref.
1952	Grand Prix	Detective Story	Nominated	
1957	Palme d'Or	Friendly Persuasion	Won	
1965	Palme d'Or	The Collector	Nominated	

=== Directors Guild of America Awards ===
Year	Category	Nominated work	Result	Ref.
1952	Outstanding Directorial Achievement	Detective Story	Nominated	
1954	Outstanding Directorial Achievement	Roman Holiday	Nominated	
1957	Outstanding Directorial Achievement	Friendly Persuasion	Nominated	
1959	Outstanding Directorial Achievement	The Big Country	Nominated	
1960	Outstanding Directorial Achievement	Ben-Hur	Won	
1962	Outstanding Directorial Achievement	The Children's Hour	Nominated	
1966	Lifetime Achievement Award		Received	
1969	Outstanding Directorial Achievement	Funny Girl	Nominated	

=== National Board of Review ===
Year	Category	Nominated work	Result	Ref.
1946	Best Director	The Best Years of Our Lives	Won	
1955	Best Director	The Desperate Hours	Won	

=== New York Film Critics Circle ===
Year	Category	Nominated work	Result	Ref.
1936	Best Director	Dodsworth	Nominated	
1940	Best Director	The Letter	Nominated	
1946	Best Director	The Best Years of Our Lives	Won	
1955	Best Director	The Desperate Hours	Nominated	
1959	Best Director	Ben-Hur	Nominated	

=== Venice International Film Festival ===
Year	Category	Nominated work	Result	Ref.
1938	Best Foreign Film	Jezebel	Nominated	
1938	Special Recommendation	Jezebel	Won	
1952	Golden Lion	Carrie	Nominated	
1953	Golden Lion	Roman Holiday	Nominated	

== Direction for Oscar-related performances ==
Year	Performer	Film	Result
Academy Award for Best Actor
1937	Walter Huston	Dodsworth	Nominated
1940	Laurence Olivier	Wuthering Heights	Nominated
1943	Walter Pidgeon	Mrs. Miniver	Nominated
1947	Fredric March	The Best Years of Our Lives	Won
1960	Charlton Heston	Ben-Hur	Won
Academy Award for Best Actress
1939	Bette Davis	Jezebel	Won
1941	Bette Davis	The Letter	Nominated
1942	Bette Davis	The Little Foxes	Nominated
1943	Greer Garson	Mrs. Miniver	Won
1950	Olivia de Havilland	The Heiress	Won
1952	Eleanor Parker	Detective Story	Nominated
1954	Audrey Hepburn	Roman Holiday	Won
1966	Samantha Eggar	The Collector	Nominated
1969	Barbra Streisand	Funny Girl	Won
Academy Award for Best Supporting Actor
1937	Walter Brennan	Come and Get It	Won
1941	Walter Brennan	The Westerner	Won
1941	James Stephenson	The Letter	Nominated
1943	Henry Travers	Mrs. Miniver	Nominated
1947	Harold Russell	The Best Years of Our Lives	Won (Note: In addition to his competitive acting category win, Harold Russell also received a special Academy Honorary Award for his performance and wartime service. This thus renders him the only actor in Academy Awards history to earn two Oscars for the same performance.)
1950	Ralph Richardson	The Heiress	Nominated
1954	Eddie Albert	Roman Holiday	Nominated
1957	Anthony Perkins	Friendly Persuasion	Nominated
1959	Burl Ives	The Big Country	Won
1960	Hugh Griffith	Ben-Hur	Won
Academy Award for Best Supporting Actress
1937	Bonita Granville	These Three	Nominated
1937	Maria Ouspenskaya	Dodsworth	Nominated
1938	Claire Trevor	Dead End	Nominated
1939	Fay Bainter	Jezebel	Won
1940	Geraldine Fitzgerald	Wuthering Heights	Nominated
1942	Patricia Collinge	The Little Foxes	Nominated
1942	Teresa Wright	The Little Foxes	Nominated
1943	Teresa Wright	Mrs. Miniver	Won
1943	May Whitty	Mrs. Miniver	Nominated
1952	Lee Grant	Detective Story	Nominated
1962	Fay Bainter	The Children's Hour	Nominated
1969	Kay Medford	Funny Girl	Nominated

== See also ==
- William Wyler filmography
