= National Board of Review Awards 1941 =

Annual US film awards ceremony

13th National Board of Review Awards

December 20, 1941

The 13th National Board of Review Awards were given on 20 December 1941.

== Best American Films ==
1. Citizen Kane
2. How Green Was My Valley
3. The Little Foxes
4. The Stars Look Down
5. Dumbo
6. High Sierra
7. Here Comes Mr. Jordan
8. Tom, Dick and Harry
9. Road to Zanzibar
10. The Lady Eve

== Winners ==
- Best Documentary: Target for Tonight
- Best Foreign Film: Pépé le Moko (1937), France
- Best Picture: Citizen Kane
- Best Acting:
  - Sara Allgood - How Green Was My Valley
  - Mary Astor - The Great Lie and The Maltese Falcon
  - Ingrid Bergman - Rage in Heaven
  - Humphrey Bogart - High Sierra and The Maltese Falcon
  - Patricia Collinge - The Little Foxes
  - Gary Cooper - Sergeant York
  - George Coulouris - Citizen Kane
  - Donald Crisp - How Green Was My Valley
  - Bing Crosby - Road to Zanzibar and Birth of the Blues
  - Bette Davis - The Little Foxes
  - Isobel Elsom - Ladies in Retirement
  - Joan Fontaine - Suspicion
  - Greta Garbo - Two-Faced Woman
  - James Gleason - Meet John Doe and Here Comes Mr. Jordan
  - Walter Huston - All That Money Can Buy (a.k.a. The Devil and Daniel Webster)
  - Ida Lupino - High Sierra and Ladies in Retirement
  - Roddy McDowall - How Green Was My Valley
  - Robert Montgomery - Here Comes Mr. Jordan and Rage in Heaven
  - Ginger Rogers - Kitty Foyle and Tom, Dick and Harry
  - James Stephenson - The Letter and Shining Victory
  - Orson Welles - Citizen Kane
