= The Little Foxes (film) =

1941 film by William Wyler

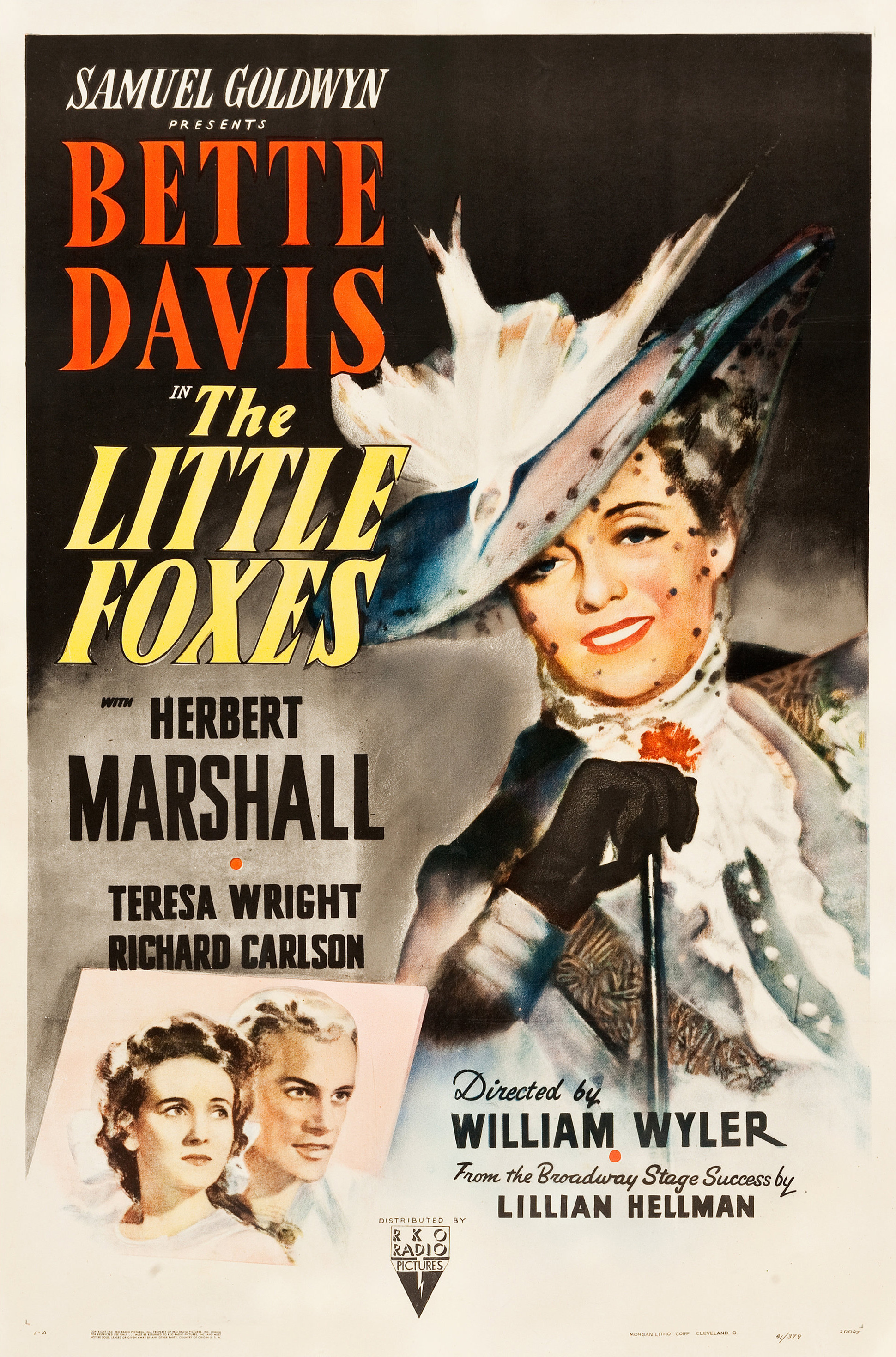
- Theatrical release poster by William Rose
- Directed by: William Wyler
- Screenplay by: Lillian Hellman
- Based on: The Little Foxes; 1939 play by Lillian Hellman
- Produced by: Samuel Goldwyn
- Starring: Bette Davis; Herbert Marshall; Teresa Wright
- Cinematography: Gregg Toland
- Edited by: Daniel Mandell
- Music by: Meredith Willson
- Production company: Samuel Goldwyn Productions
- Distributed by: RKO Radio Pictures
- Release dates: August 29, 1941 (U.S.); August 20, 1941 (Premiere-New York City)
- Running time: 115 minutes
- Country: United States
- Language: English
- Box office: $2,167,000 (worldwide rentals)

The Little Foxes is a 1941 American drama film directed by William Wyler. The screenplay by Lillian Hellman is based on her 1939 play The Little Foxes. Hellman's ex-husband Arthur Kober, Dorothy Parker and Parker's husband Alan Campbell contributed additional scenes and dialogue.

The film's title comes from Chapter 2, Verse 15 of the Song of Solomon in the King James version of the Bible, which reads, "Take us the foxes, the little foxes, that spoil the vines: for our vines have tender grapes."

== Plot ==
The Hubbards, a wealthy but corrupt family, are entertaining a dinner guest, William Marshall, a prominent Chicago businessman with whom they hope to partner in an enterprise to build a cotton mill in their sleepy Alabama town, called Paltou, taking advantage of low wages paid to workers. Marshall looks favorably on the plan and invites Regina Giddens to let him show her Chicago. After he leaves, Regina reveals that she plans to move to Chicago, taking her 17-year-old daughter, Alexandra, with her. She plans to finally live the privileged life she believes she deserves, away from the backward place where they presently live.

Regina, thoroughly scheming, proceeds to drive a hard bargain with her equally scheming brothers, Oscar and Ben, for a forty-percent share of the mill in exchange for persuading her husband Horace to invest $75,000, only a one-third share. She sends Alexandra to Baltimore to bring Horace home, supposedly because Regina misses him. At the end of the evening, Oscar cruelly slaps his wife Birdie across the face, which startles Alexandra. Birdie dismisses it as her spraining her ankle.

When Alexandra accuses childhood friend, David Hewitt, a journalist for the local newspaper, of not liking anyone in her family, he teases her saying he likes one person — her papa. Bidding her farewell at the train station as she leaves to pick up her father, he instructs her to open her eyes to circumstances surrounding her and to “think for yourself.” On her trip, he encourages her to widen her world, speak to strangers, and go beyond the societal conventions for women. Realizing that she will resent him for revealing truths about her unsavory family, he gently prods her to increase awareness. On another occasion, when asked by Regina whether he is courting her daughter, David replies that at present he is not declaring his intention, but that if he decides to do so, he will not care whether or not she approves.

Oscar, having married and abused the sweet-souled, fragile, now-alcoholic Birdie only to acquire her family's plantation, Lionnet, and its rich cotton fields, now schemes to consolidate the family wealth by an incestuous marriage between his son, Leo, and Alexandra, but neither Horace, Birdie nor Regina like the idea.

When Horace dislikes the proposal to invest in the cotton mill, Regina continues to press him, making him aware of her mercenary motives for asking him to return home. While the two of them argue upstairs, the brothers find an alternative. Leo, a teller at the bank, will “borrow” Horace's railroad bonds from his safe deposit box. They will use them as security for the construction, returning them long before it is time to clip the coupons. Gloating, Ben tells a furious and bewildered Regina they don't need her.

Birdie, Alexandra, Horace, David, and Addie, the family's housekeeper have a little party while Regina is at David's mother's house, getting her dresses fitted. Birdie, in tears, reveals that she drinks in her bedroom, while realizing that she was miserably unhappy in her marriage, always having known that Oscar had only married her for her family's land, and that she outright disliked her own son. Showing compassion for her, Alexandra escorts the distraught Birdie back to her house.

The next day, Horace checks the content of his safe deposit box in the Hubbard-owned bank, of which he is president, and finds that the bonds are missing. When Regina learns that her brothers have “borrowed” the bonds without permission, she threatens her brothers and nephew with exposure and sending them to jail unless they give her 75% of the venture's profit.

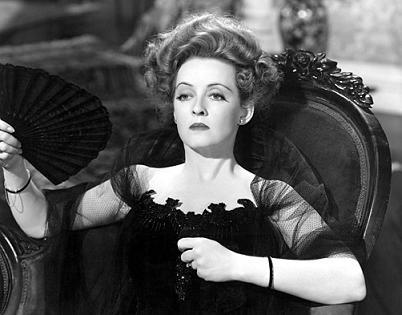
Bette Davis in The Little Foxes

Quarreling alone with Regina, Horace intends to frustrate and punish his contemptuous wife's scheming by claiming he lent her brothers the bonds. She would only be entitled to repayment of the loan without any share of the profits. He also announces that he has changed his will with the help of his attorney, Saul Fowler, leaving Regina with only the repayment of the stolen bonds, while the rest of the estate would go to Alexandra.

Regina spews her hatred for him, informing him that she never loved him and had grown contemptuous of his unquestioning acceptance of her constant excuses for rejecting his affections. During the quarrel, Horace suffers a heart attack, and Regina callously refuses him his heart medication. Normally a wheelchair user, he collapses attempting to climb up the staircase to reach his medication while Regina makes no move to help. Only after he collapses, does she bother to call her servants to help her bring him to his room. However, Horace dies soon after.

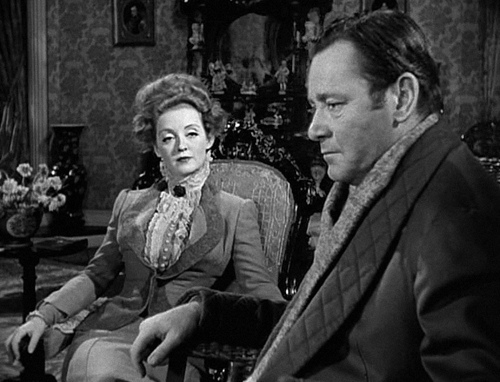
Bette Davis and Herbert Marshall

Regina now forces her brothers to give her 75% ownership of the business, threatening to reveal their crimes to the local magistrate, and them being jailed. While Oscar is truly infuriated with the loss of the money and power that he so wanted, Ben takes the loss more philosophically, saying that he must accept it for now, but the situation may turn. For example, he might begin to ask what a man in a wheelchair was doing on a staircase. A bewildered Alexandra overhears this. “What was Papa doing on the staircase?” She asks her relatives.

Alexandra becomes aware of her mother's and uncles’ perfidy. She confronts her mother telling her that she wasn't going to stand by and watch people like her eat the earth and causing all kinds of hurt and tragedy. Comforting her, David gently tells her that she had to learn the truth by herself; she would have resented anyone who told her about her family. Alexandra and David leave town and her completely poisonous family for a new life together. Regina, now wealthy, is left utterly alone: her daughter has left, her husband has died on account of her willful neglect, and her brothers are unable to be trusted.

== Cast ==
- Bette Davis as Regina Hubbard Giddens
- Herbert Marshall as Horace Giddens
- Teresa Wright as Alexandra "Zannie" Giddens
- Richard Carlson as David Hewitt
- Dan Duryea as Leo Hubbard
- Patricia Collinge as Birdie Hubbard
- Charles Dingle as Ben Hubbard
- Carl Benton Reid as Oscar Hubbard
- Jessica Grayson as Addie (as Jessie Grayson)
- John Marriott as Cal
- Russell Hicks as William Marshall
- Lucien Littlefield as Manders
- Virginia Brissac as Mrs. Hewitt
- Terry Nibert as Julia
- Henry 'Hot Shot' Thomas as Harold
- Charles R. Moore as Simon
- Hooper Atchley as Party Guest (uncredited)
- Al Bridge as Dawson (uncredited)
- Tex Driscoll as Bank Customer (uncredited)
- Jesse Graves as Headwaiter (uncredited)
- Lew Kelly as Train Companion (uncredited)
- Henry Roquemore as Depositor (uncredited)
- Kenny Washington as Servant (uncredited)

== Production ==
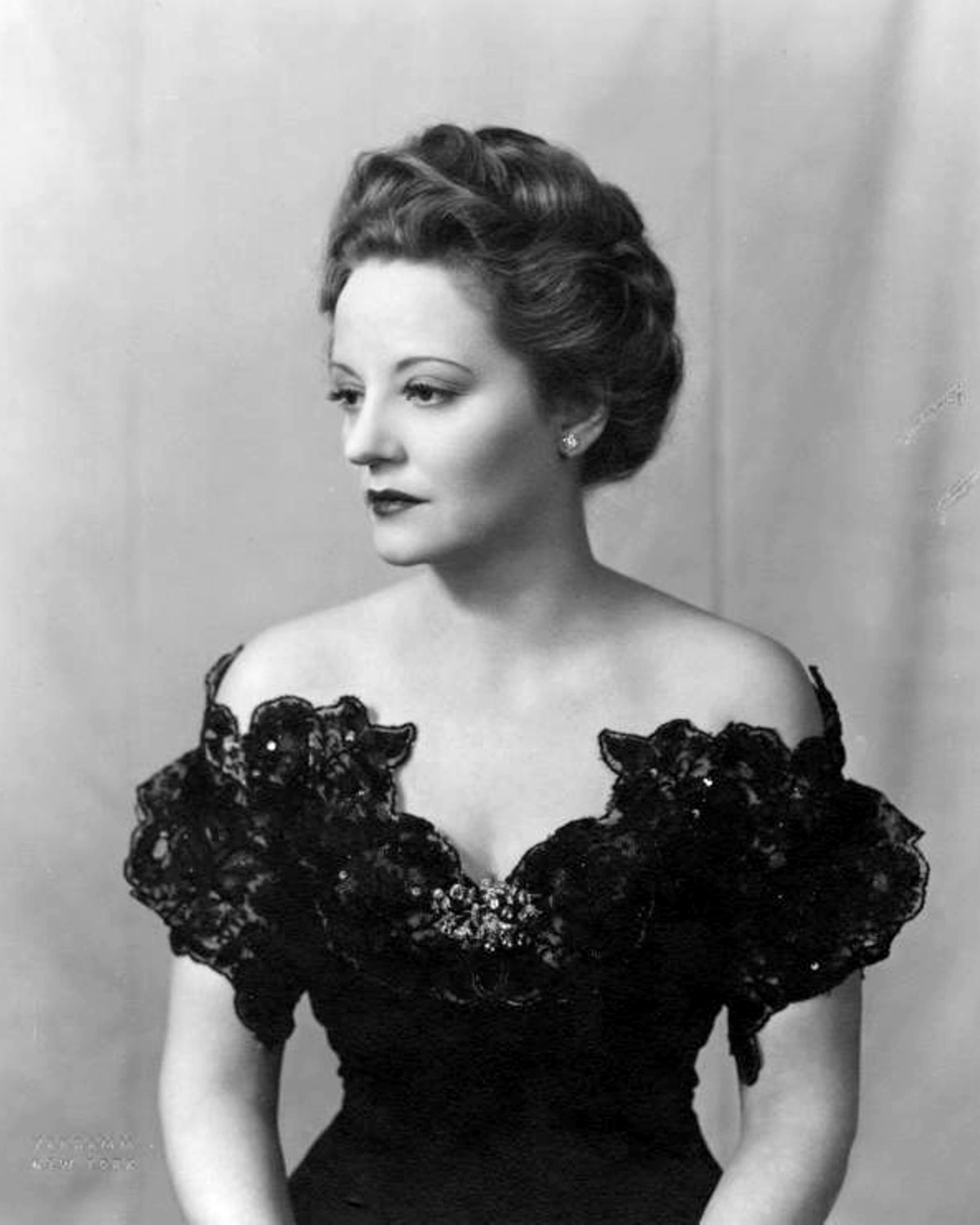
Tallulah Bankhead as Regina Giddens in the original Broadway production of The Little Foxes (1939)

The title comes from Chapter 2, Verse 15 in the Song of Solomon in the King James version of the Bible, which reads, "Take us the foxes, the little foxes, that spoil the vines: for our vines have tender grapes." The same passage also inspired the title of an unrelated film, Our Vines Have Tender Grapes.

Tallulah Bankhead had received critical acclaim for her performance in the 1939 Broadway production of Hellman's play, but director William Wyler insisted on casting Bette Davis, with whom he had previously teamed on Jezebel and The Letter, in the lead role instead. Producer Samuel Goldwyn agreed, since none of Bankhead's films had been box office hits. (Coincidentally, Davis had recreated on film another of Bankhead's Broadway roles, Judith Traherne in Dark Victory.) However, Davis was reluctant: "On The Little Foxes I begged the producer, Samuel Goldwyn, to let Tallulah Bankhead play Regina because Tallulah was magnificent on the stage. He wouldn't let her." Initially Jack L. Warner refused to lend Davis to Goldwyn, who then offered the role to Miriam Hopkins. When Wyler refused to work with her, Goldwyn resumed negotiations with Warner and finally secured Davis for $385,000. As a contract player at Warner Bros., Davis was earning $3,000 a week, and when she discovered how much Warner had received for her appearance in Foxes, she demanded and ultimately received a share of the payment.

Wyler encouraged Davis to see Bankhead in the original play, which she did despite major misgivings. She later regretted doing so because after watching Bankhead's performance and reading Hellman's screenplay she felt compelled to create a totally different interpretation of the role, one she didn't feel suited the character. Bankhead had portrayed Regina as a victim forced to fight for her survival due to the contempt with which her brothers treated her, but Davis played her as a cold, conniving, calculating woman wearing a death mask of white powder she insisted makeup artist Perc Westmore create for her.

In her autobiography, A Lonely Life, Davis gave a different version about having to see Bankhead in the play. "A great admirer of hers, I wanted in no way to be influenced by her work. It was Willie's intention that I give a different interpretation of the part. I insisted that Tallulah had played it the only way it could be played. Miss Hellman's Regina was written with such definition that it could only be played one way." "I had to do that part exactly the way Tallulah did it, because that's the way Lillian Hellman wrote it. But I was always sad that Tallulah couldn't record Regina from the theatre, because she was marvelous."

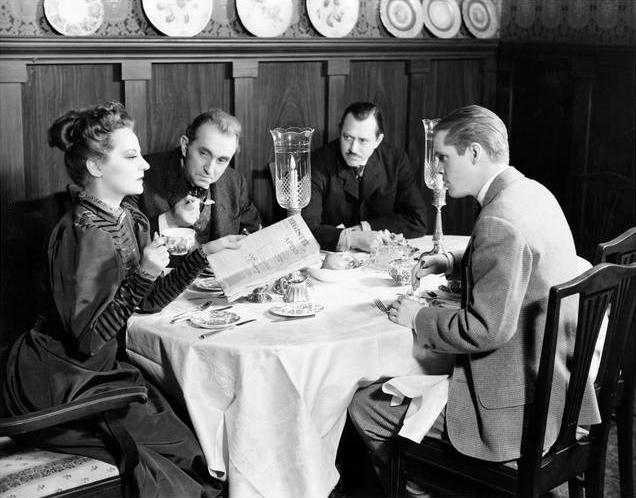
Tallulah Bankhead, Charles Dingle, Carl Benton Reid and Dan Duryea in the original Broadway production of The Little Foxes (1939)

Charles Dingle, Carl Benton Reid, Dan Duryea, and Patricia Collinge all reprised their critically acclaimed Broadway performances. Critics preferred Bankhead's rendition of the role to Davis's, though the supporting cast was highly praised. The character of David Hewitt was not in the original play. Hellman created him to add a second sympathetic male to stand alongside Horace among all the venomous Hubbard men.

Davis and Wyler frequently fought during filming, about everything from her appearance (Wyler thought she looked like a Kabuki performer, but Davis wanted to look older than her age as the part was written for a 40-year-old) to the set design (which Davis thought was far too opulent for a family supposedly struggling financially) to her interpretation of the role (Wyler wanted a more feminine and sympathetic Regina, akin to Tallulah's interpretation). Davis had yielded to Wyler's demands during production of The Letter, but this time she held her ground. Not helping the situation was the fact Los Angeles was experiencing its worst heat wave in years, and the temperature on the soundstages regularly rose above 100 degrees. Davis finally walked off the picture. "It was the only time in my career that I walked out on a film after the shooting had begun," she later recalled. "I was a nervous wreck due to the fact that my favorite and most admired director was fighting me every inch of the way ... I just didn't want to continue." The actress retreated to her rented house in Laguna Beach and "flatly refused to come back to work. It took a little courage, to say the least. Goldwyn had it in his power to sue me for the entire cost of the production." A week later she returned to the set after rumors she would be replaced by Katharine Hepburn or Miriam Hopkins began to circulate, although Goldwyn was not about to bear the expense of scrapping all the footage with Davis and refilming the scenes with a new actress. Even though the film was a critical and commercial success and nominated for nine Academy Awards, she and Wyler never worked together again. The film premiered at Radio City Music Hall in New York City. The New York Times reported it was seen by 22,163 persons on its opening day, setting what was then an all-time attendance mark for a normal opening day at the theatre.

In 1946, Hellman wrote the play Another Part of the Forest, a prequel to Foxes. It was adapted for the screen in 1948.

In 2003, the character of Regina Giddens, played by Davis, was ranked No. 43 on the American Film Institute list of the 50 Best Villains of American Cinema.

== Critical reception ==
On Rotten Tomatoes, the movie currently holds 100% favorable rating based on sixteen reviews. Once the movie premiered at the Radio City Music Hall, Bosley Crowther of The New York Times observed,

Lillian Hellman's grim and malignant melodrama... has now been translated to the screen with all its original viciousness intact ... [It] leaps to the front as the most bitingly sinister picture of the year and as one of the most cruelly realistic character studies yet shown on the screen ... Mr. Wyler, with the aid of Gregg Toland, has used the camera to sweep in the myriad small details of a mauve decadent household and the more indicative facets of the many characters... Miss Davis's performance in the role which Talluluh Bankhead played so brassily on the stage is abundant with color and mood... she does occasionally drop an unmistakable imitation of her predecessor... Better than that, however, are the other members of the cast. Charles Dingle as Brother Ben Hubbard, the oldest and sharpest of the rattlesnake clan, is the perfect villain in respectable garb. Carl Benton Reid as Brother Oscar is magnificently dark, sullen and undependable. Patricia Collinge repeats her excellent stage performance... The Little Foxes will not increase your admiration for mankind. It is cold and cynical. But it is a very exciting picture to watch in a comfortably objective way, especially if you enjoy expert stabbing-in-the-back.

Variety said,

From starring Bette Davis down the line to the bit roles portrayed by minor Negroes the acting is well nigh flawless ... Marshall turns in one of his top performances ... On top of the smooth pace, Wyler has handled every detail with an acutely dramatic touch.

== Box office ==
According to RKO records, The Little Foxes took in $1,317,000 in theater rentals from the United States and Canada and an additional $850,000 from foreign rentals, but because of the favorable terms Sam Goldwyn enjoyed with distributor RKO, RKO recorded an ultimate loss of $140,000 on the film.

== Awards and nominations ==
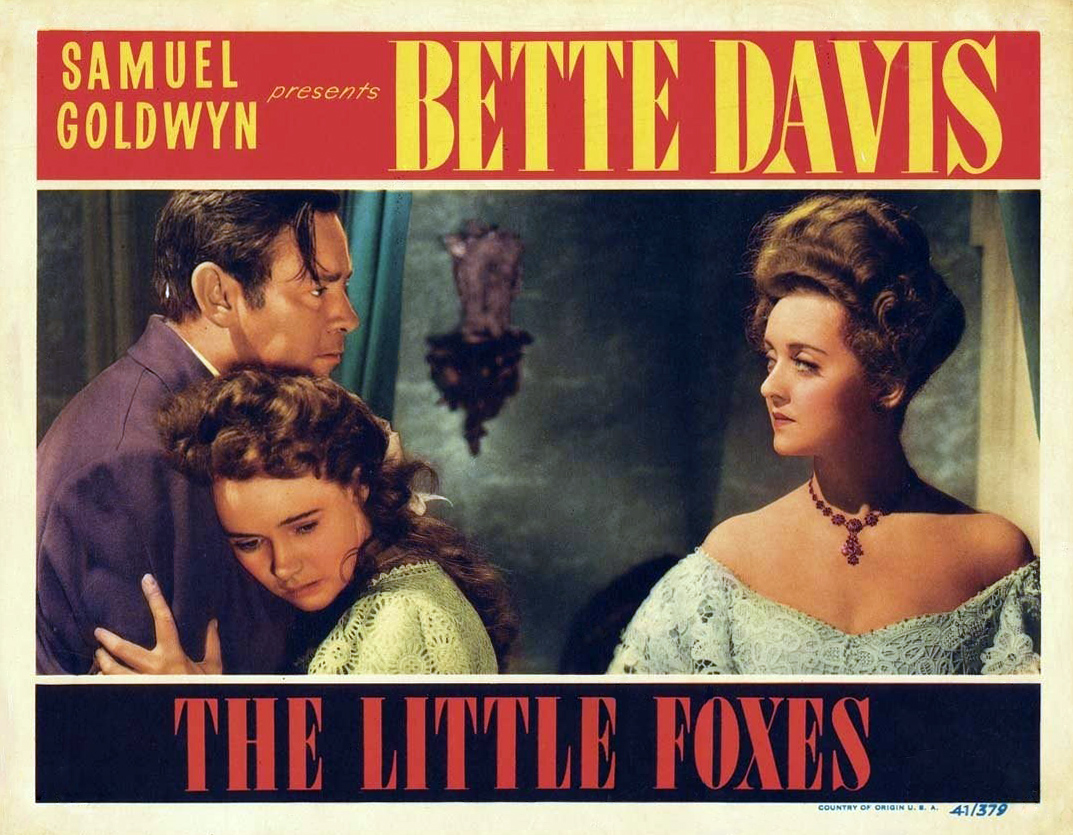
Lobby card

The film received 9 Academy Award nominations and no wins, setting a record later tied by Peyton Place in 1957. The record was surpassed by The Turning Point in 1977, which received 11 nominations without a win; The Color Purple earned the same distinction in 1985.

Award	Category	Nominee(s)	Result
Academy Awards	Outstanding Motion Picture	Samuel Goldwyn	Nominated
Academy Awards	Best Director	William Wyler	Nominated
Academy Awards	Best Actress	Bette Davis	Nominated
Academy Awards	Best Supporting Actress	Patricia Collinge	Nominated
Academy Awards	Best Supporting Actress	Teresa Wright	Nominated
Academy Awards	Best Screenplay	Lillian Hellman	Nominated
Academy Awards	Best Art Direction–Interior Decoration – Black-and-White	Stephen Goosson and Howard Bristol	Nominated
Academy Awards	Best Film Editing	Daniel Mandell	Nominated
Academy Awards	Best Scoring of a Dramatic Picture	Meredith Willson	Nominated
National Board of Review Awards	Top Ten Films		3rd Place
National Board of Review Awards	Best Acting	Patricia Collinge	Won
National Board of Review Awards	Best Acting	Bette Davis	Won

== Radio adaptation ==
The Little Foxes was presented February 11, 1946, on Screen Guild Theatre. The 30-minute adaptation starred Davis, Wright and Dingle in their roles from the film. Tallulah Bankhead (reprising her Broadway role) also gave a radio adaptation.

== In popular culture ==
In 1975, the eighth episode of the ninth season of The Carol Burnett Show featured a spoof of the film called "The Little Foxies", with Carol Burnett as "Virgina Grubber Gibbons", Roddy McDowall as "Morris Gibbons", Harvey Korman as "Bosco Grubber", Vicki Lawrence as "Burly Grubber" and Tim Conway as "Theo Grubber".
