= William Wyler =

German-born American film director (1902–1981)

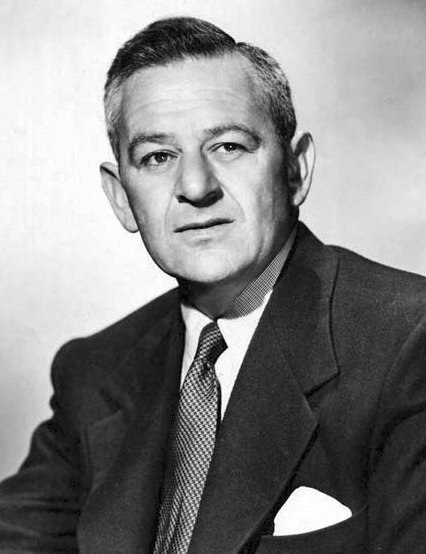
- Wyler in 1945
- Born: Willi Wyler; July 1, 1902; Mülhausen, German Empire (now in France)
- Died: July 27, 1981 (aged 79); Beverly Hills, California, U.S.
- Resting place: Forest Lawn Memorial Park, Glendale, California, U.S.
- Citizenship: Switzerland; U.S. (from 1928)
- Occupations: Film director; producer
- Years active: 1925–1970
- Spouses: Margaret Sullavan (m. 1934; div. 1936) Margaret Tallichet (m. 1938)
- Children: 5
- Relatives: Carl Laemmle Jr. (cousin)
- Military career
- Allegiance: United States
- Branch: Army National Guard; Army Air Forces
- Service years: 1921–1922 (National Guard); 1942–1945 (Army Air Forces)
- Rank: Lieutenant Colonel
- Units: Army Signal Corps; New York Army National Guard
- Conflicts: World War II: European Theater
- Awards: Purple Heart; American Campaign Medal; European–African–Middle Eastern Campaign Medal; World War II Victory Medal

William Wyler (/ˈwaɪlər/; born Willi Wyler (German: [ˈvɪli ˈvi:lɐ]); July 1, 1902 – July 27, 1981) was a German-born American film director and producer. Known for his work in numerous genres over five decades, he received numerous accolades, including the most nominations for the Academy Award for Best Director (12). In addition to three Academy Awards, he also received two BAFTA Awards and one Golden Globe Award. For his oeuvre of work, Wyler was awarded the Irving G. Thalberg Memorial Award, the Directors Guild of America Lifetime Achievement Award, and the American Film Institute Life Achievement Award.

Wyler emigrated to the United States in 1921 where he worked first for Universal Studios in New York before moving to Los Angeles. By 1925, he was the youngest director at Universal, and in 1929 he directed Hell's Heroes, Universal's first sound production filmed entirely on location. Wyler went on to win the Academy Award for Best Director three times, for Mrs. Miniver (1942), The Best Years of Our Lives (1946), and Ben-Hur (1959), all of which also won for Best Picture. He was Oscar-nominated for Dodsworth (1936), Wuthering Heights (1939), The Letter (1940), The Little Foxes (1941), The Heiress (1949), Detective Story (1952), Roman Holiday (1953), Friendly Persuasion (1956), and The Collector (1965).

Film historian Ian Freer calls Wyler a "bona fide perfectionist", whose penchant for retakes and an attempt to hone every last nuance "became the stuff of legend." His ability to direct a string of classic literary adaptations into huge box-office and critical successes made him one of "Hollywood's most bankable moviemakers" from the 1930s to the 1960s. Through his talent for staging, editing, and camera movement, he turned dynamic theatrical spaces into cinematic ones. Wyler is also known for his work as an actors' director, often propelling them to stardom.

== Early life ==
Wyler was born to a Jewish family in Mulhouse, Alsace-Lorraine (then part of the German Empire, now France). His Swiss-born father Leopold started as a traveling salesman but later became a thriving haberdasher in Mulhouse. His mother, Melanie (née Auerbach; died February 13, 1955, Los Angeles, aged 77), was German-born, and a cousin of Carl Laemmle, founder of Universal Pictures. During Wyler's childhood, he attended a number of schools and developed a reputation as "something of a hellraiser", being expelled more than once for misbehavior. His mother often took him and his older brother Robert to concerts, opera, and the theatre, as well as the early cinema. Sometimes at home his family and their friends would stage amateur theatricals for personal enjoyment.

Wyler was supposed to inherit the family haberdashery business in Mulhouse. After World War I and the ceding of Alsace-Lorraine to France, he spent a dismal year working in Paris at 100.000 Chemises selling shirts and ties. He was so poor that he often spent his time wandering around the Pigalle district. After realizing that Willy was not interested in the haberdashery business, his mother, Melanie, contacted her distant cousin, Carl Laemmle, who owned Universal Studios, about opportunities for him.

Laemmle was in the habit of coming to Europe each year, searching for promising young men who would work in the United States. In 1921, Wyler, while traveling as a Swiss citizen (his father's status automatically conferred Swiss citizenship on his sons), met Laemmle who hired him to work at Universal Studios in New York. As Wyler said: "America seemed as far away as the moon." Booked onto a ship to New York with Laemmle for his return voyage, Wyler met a young Czech man, Paul Kohner (later the famous independent agent), aboard the same ship. Their enjoyment of the first class trip was short-lived, however, as they found they had to repay the cost of the passage out of their $25 weekly income as messengers to Universal Pictures. After working in New York for several years, and even serving in the New York Army National Guard for a year, Wyler moved to Hollywood to become a director.

== Career ==
=== 1923–1929: Early work and silent films ===
Around 1923, Wyler arrived in Los Angeles and began work on the Universal Studios lot in the swing gang, cleaning the stages and moving the sets. His break came when he was hired as a second assistant editor. But his work ethic was uneven, and he would often sneak off and play billiards in a pool hall across the street from the studio, or organize card games during working hours. After some ups and downs (including getting fired), Wyler put all his efforts into becoming a director. He started as a third assistant director and by 1925 he became the youngest director on the Universal lot directing the westerns that Universal was famed for turning out. Wyler was so engrossed in his work that he would dream about "different ways (for an actor) to get on a horse". In several of the one-reelers, he would join the posse in the inevitable chase of the 'bad man'.

He directed his first non-Western, the lost Anybody Here Seen Kelly?, in 1928. This was followed by his first part-talkie films, The Shakedown and The Love Trap. He proved himself an able craftsman. In 1928 he became a naturalized United States citizen. His first all-talking film, and Universal's first sound production to be filmed entirely on location, was Hell's Heroes, filmed in the Mojave Desert in 1929.

=== 1930–1949: Career acclaim and stardom ===
In the early 1930s Wyler directed a wide variety of films at Universal, ranging from high-profile dramas such as The Storm, A House Divided with Walter Huston, and Counsellor at Law with John Barrymore, to comedies like Her First Mate with Zasu Pitts and The Good Fairy with Margaret Sullavan. He became well known for his insistence on multiple retakes, resulting in often award-winning and critically acclaimed performances from his actors. After leaving Universal he began a long collaboration with Samuel Goldwyn for whom he directed such classics as Dodsworth (1936) where he earned his first nomination for the Academy Award for Best Director. The film starred Walter Huston, Ruth Chatterton and Mary Astor, "sparking a 20-year run of almost unbroken greatness." He also directed These Three (1936) with Miriam Hopkins and Merle Oberon, Dead End (1937) with Humphrey Bogart, Wuthering Heights (1939) with Laurence Olivier and Merle Oberon, The Westerner (1940) with Gary Cooper and Walter Brennan, The Little Foxes (1941) with Bette Davis, and The Best Years of Our Lives (1946) with Myrna Loy and Fredric March.

Wyler's visual style pioneered long, uncut takes in what has come to be called deep-focus cinematography - the use of lenses which can take in the entire depth of a room, keeping everything in focus, i.e. depth of field, and thus can contain dramatic changes in lighting and characters' movements in the same shot. In this, he collaborated with the pathbreaking young cinematographer of 1940's Citizen Kane, Gregg Toland. Gregg Toland shot three of the director's films: Wuthering Heights (1939), where Toland's use of low angles, dark shadows and diffusion won him the Oscar for best cinematography; next in Lillian Hellman's adaptation of her searing stage play, The Little Foxes, into Wyler's 1941 film, which had Wyler and Toland working closely together to bring the hard-edged deep focus from Citizen Kane to bear on another tale of soul-destroying family wealth - including inventing a totally white make-up scheme for its star, Bette Davis, conveying her soullessness. Third, is Toland's work in one of the cinematographer's last films The Best Years of Our Lives (1946). This story of three American servicemen struggling to adjust to civilian life after fighting in World War 2 hit a chord with postwar audiences. Memorable examples of deep focus here include the complex scene in which the three men wind up at the same bar, unable to stay at home, and, in its powerful closing shot, a crowded family wedding disperses, leaving only two young lovers staring at one another across the expanse of an empty living room, as stunned in place, seemingly, as the camera. All three films were decorated with multiple Oscars (see the following section).

It was all Wyler. I had known all the horrors of no direction and bad direction. I now knew what a great director was and what he could mean to an actress. I will always be grateful to him for his toughness and his genius.

— Bette Davis, discussing Jezebel

Bette Davis received three Oscar nominations for her screen work under Wyler, and won her second Oscar for her performance in Wyler's 1938 film Jezebel. She told Merv Griffin in 1972 that Wyler trained her with that film to be a "far, far better actress" than she had been. She recalled a scene that was only a bare paragraph in the script, but "without a word of dialog, Willy created a scene of power and tension. This was moviemaking on the highest plane," she said. "A scene of such suspense that I never have not marveled at the direction of it." During her acceptance speech when she received the AFI Life Achievement Award in 1977, she thanked him.

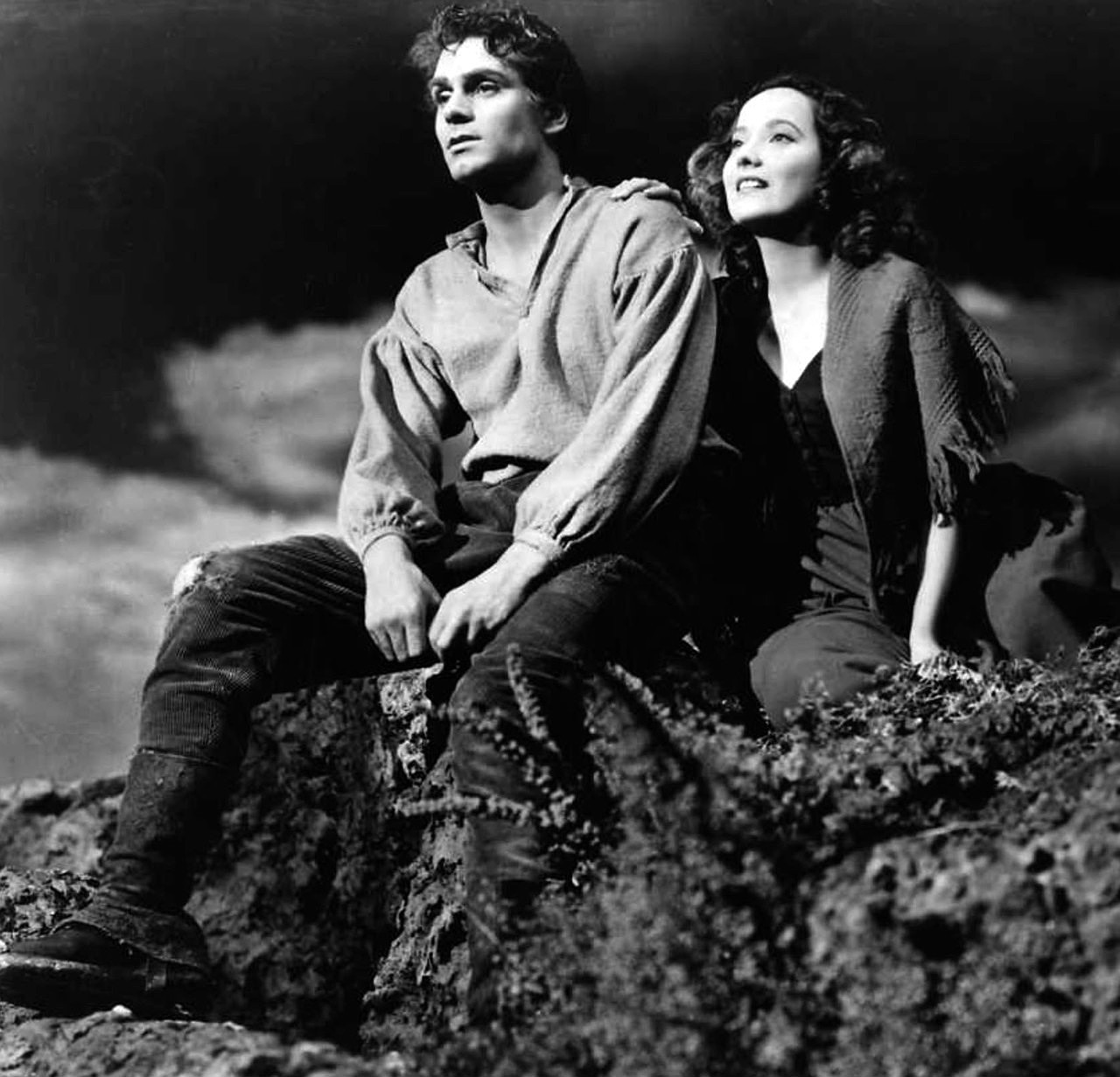
Olivier and Oberon in Wuthering Heights

Laurence Olivier, whom Wyler directed in Wuthering Heights (1939) for his first Oscar nomination, credited Wyler with teaching him how to act for the screen, despite clashing with Wyler on multiple occasions. Olivier would go on to hold the record for the most nominations in the Best Actor category at nine, tied with Spencer Tracy. Critic Frank S. Nugent wrote in The New York Times: "William Wyler has directed it magnificently. It is, unquestionably, one of the most distinguished pictures of the year." Variety described Olivier's performance as "fantastic... he not only brings conviction to his portrayal but translates intelligently its mystical quality."

Five years later, in 1944, while visiting London, Wyler met with Olivier and his actress wife, Vivien Leigh. She invited him to see her performance in The Doctor's Dilemma, and Olivier asked him to direct him in his planned film, Henry V. But Wyler said he was "not a Shakespearian" and turned down the offer.

If any film actor is having trouble with his career, can't master the medium and, anyway, wonders whether it's worth it, let him pray to meet a man like William Wyler.

— Laurence Olivier

In 1950, Wyler and Olivier made a second film together, Carrie, which was not a commercial success. However, some critics state that it nonetheless contains Olivier's finest film performance, but because of its old-fashioned story, the film was very under-appreciated: In critic Michael Billington's opinion:

If there were any justice in the world, Laurence Olivier would have got an Oscar for his unforgettable performance in Carrie.

Director and screenwriter John Huston had been a close friend of Wyler during his career. When he was twenty-eight and penniless, sleeping in parks in London, Huston returned to Hollywood to see if he could find work. Wyler, four years his senior, had met Huston when he was directing his father, Walter Huston, in A House Divided in 1931, and they got along well. Wyler read dialogue suggestions that Huston had given to his father Walter and hired John to work on the dialogue for the script. He later inspired Huston to become a director and became his "early mentor." When America entered World War II in 1941, Wyler, Huston, Anatole Litvak and Frank Capra, by then all directors, enlisted at the same time. Later in his career, Huston recalled his friendship with Wyler during an interview:

Willy was certainly my best friend in the industry.... We seemed instantly to have many things in common.... Willy liked the things that I liked. We'd go down to Mexico. We'd go up in the mountains. And we'd gamble. He was a wonderful companion....He was equally capable of playing Beethoven on his violin, speeding around town on his motorcycle, or schussing down steep virgin snow trails.

==== Wyler and the Second World War ====
In 1941, Wyler directed Mrs. Miniver, based on the 1940 novel; it was the story of a middle-class English family adjusting to the war in Europe and the bombing blitz in London. It starred Greer Garson and Walter Pidgeon. Pidgeon originally had doubts about taking on the role, until fellow actor Paul Lukas told him, "You will find working with Wyler to be the most delightful experience you ever had, and that's the way it turned out." Pidgeon recalled: "One thing that would have been a terrific regret in my life is if I had succeeded in getting out of doing Mrs. Miniver" He received his first Oscar nomination for his role, while his co-star, Greer Garson, won her first and only Academy Award for her performance.

The film idea was controversial because it was intended to cause the United States to be less isolationist. It was thought that by seeing the suffering of British citizens depicted in fiction story, Americans might be made more willing to aid Britain during their war effort. The film succeeded in its propagandistic aims, eliciting sympathy for the British people by showing Britain during its darkest days of the war. Years later, having been in the war himself, Wyler said that the film "only scratched the surface of war... It was incomplete."

U.S. ambassador to the United Kingdom Joseph Kennedy told the studios to stop making pro-British and anti-German films, because he believed that British defeat was imminent. But MGM producer Eddie Mannix disagreed, saying that "someone should salute England. And even if we lose $100,000, that'll be okay." Mrs. Miniver went on to win six Academy Awards, becoming the top box office hit of 1942. It was Wyler's first Academy Award for Best Director.

Dear Mad Willy. I saw Mrs. Miniver last night. It is absolutely wonderful. You repeatedly amaze me with the demonstrations of your talent and I ask you to believe that it is with genuine pleasure that I salute this latest and greatest example of your work.

— producer David Selznick

President Roosevelt and British Prime Minister Winston Churchill both loved the film, said historian Emily Yellin, and Roosevelt wanted prints rushed to theaters nationwide. The Voice of America radio network broadcast the minister's speech from the film, magazines reprinted it, and it was copied onto leaflets and dropped over German-occupied countries. Churchill sent MGM chief Louis B. Mayer a telegram claiming that "Mrs. Miniver is propaganda worth 100 battleships." Bosley Crowther wrote in his New York Times review that Mrs. Miniver was the finest film yet made about the war, "and a most exalting tribute to the British."

Between 1942 and 1945, Wyler volunteered to serve as a major in the United States Army Air Forces and directed a pair of documentaries: The Memphis Belle: A Story of a Flying Fortress (1944), about a Boeing B-17 and its U.S. Army Air Force crew; and Thunderbolt! (1947), highlighting a P-47 fighter-bomber squadron in the Mediterranean. Wyler filmed The Memphis Belle at great personal risk, flying over enemy territory on actual bombing missions in 1943; on one flight, Wyler lost consciousness from lack of oxygen. Wyler's associate, cinematographer Harold J. Tannenbaum, a First Lieutenant, was shot down and perished during the filming. Director Steven Spielberg describes Wyler's filming of Memphis Belle in the 2017 Netflix series, Five Came Back. Before being assigned to the Air Force, Wyler was hired to direct the documentary The Negro Soldier on African-Americans in the United States Armed Forces.

Working on Thunderbolt! Wyler was exposed to such loud noise that he passed out. When he awoke, he found he was deaf in one ear. Partial hearing with the aid of a hearing aid eventually came back years later. Wyler returned from the War a lieutenant colonel and a disabled veteran.

Returning from the War and unsure whether he could work again, Wyler turned to a subject that he knew well and directed a film which captured the mood of the nation as it turned to peace after the war, The Best Years of Our Lives (1946). This story of the homecoming of three veterans from World War II dramatized the problems of returning veterans in their adjustment back to civilian life. Arguably his most personal film, Best Years drew on Wyler's own experience returning home to his family after three years at the front. The Best Years of Our Lives won the Academy Award for Best Director (Wyler's second) and Academy Award for Best Picture, as well as six other Academy Awards including one Academy Honorary Award.

In 1949, Wyler directed The Heiress, which earned Olivia de Havilland her second Oscar and garnered additional Oscars for Best Art Direction, Best Costume Design, and Best Music. The film is considered by some to be a highlight in her career, "that could strike envy even in the most versatile and successful actress," according to one critic.

De Havilland had seen the play in New York and felt she could play the lead perfectly. She then called Wyler to convince him to have Paramount buy the film rights. He flew to New York to see the play and moved by the story, persuaded the studio to buy it. Along with de Havilland, he managed to get Montgomery Clift and Ralph Richardson to co-star.

=== 1950–1959: Established director ===
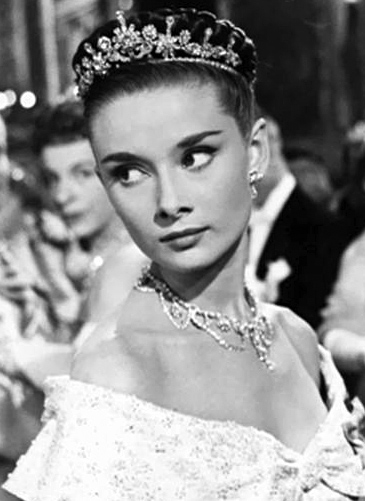
Audrey Hepburn in Roman Holiday (1953)

In 1951, Wyler produced and directed Kirk Douglas and Eleanor Parker in Detective Story, portraying a day in the lives of the various people in a detective squad. Lee Grant and Joseph Wiseman made their screen debuts in the film, which was nominated for four Academy Awards, including one for Grant. Critic Bosley Crowther lauded the film, describing it as "a brisk, absorbing film by producer-director William Wyler, with the help of a fine, responsive cast."

Carrie was released in 1952 starring Jennifer Jones in the title role and Laurence Olivier as Hurstwood. Eddie Albert played Charles Drouet. Carrie received two Academy Award nominations: Costume Design (Edith Head), and Best Art Direction (Hal Pereira, Roland Anderson, Emile Kuri). Wyler was reluctant to cast Jennifer Jones, and the filming was subsequently plagued by a variety of troubles. Jones had not revealed that she was pregnant; Wyler was mourning the death of his year-old son; Olivier had a painful leg ailment, and he developed a dislike for Jones. Hollywood was reeling under the effects of McCarthyism, and the studio was afraid to distribute a film that could be attacked as immoral. Ultimately, the ending was changed and the film was cut to make it more positive in tone.

During the immediate postwar period, Wyler directed a handful of critically acclaimed and influential films. Roman Holiday (1953) introduced Audrey Hepburn to U.S. audiences in her first starring role, winning her an Academy Award for Best Actress. Wyler said of Hepburn years later, when describing truly great actresses, "In that league there's only ever been Garbo, and the other Hepburn, and maybe Bergman. It's a rare quality, but boy, do you know when you've found it." The film was an instant hit, also winning for Best Costume Design (Edith Head), and Best Writing (Dalton Trumbo). Hepburn would eventually do three movies with Wyler, who her son said was one of the most important directors in her career.

Friendly Persuasion (1956) was awarded the Palme d'Or (Golden Palm) at the Cannes Film Festival. And in 1959, Wyler directed Ben-Hur, which won 11 Oscars, a feat unequaled until Titanic in 1997 and The Lord of the Rings: The Return of the King in 2003. He had also assisted in the production of the 1925 version.

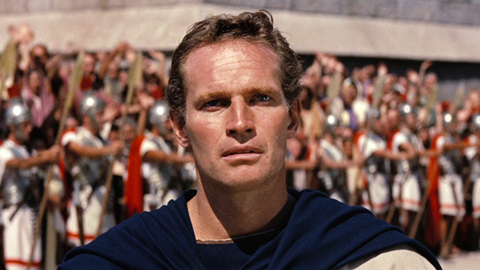
Charlton Heston as Ben-Hur

Wyler and its star, Charlton Heston, both knew what the film meant for MGM, which had massive investments in its outcome, with the film's budget having gone from $7 million to $15 million, and the fact that MGM was already in dire financial straits. They were aware that if it failed at the box office, MGM might go bankrupt.

The film, like many epics, was difficult to make. When Heston was asked which scene he enjoyed doing most, he said "I didn't enjoy any of it. It was hard work." Part of the reason for that was the financial stress placed on making the film a success. With a cast of fifteen thousand extras, a leading star, and shot on 70mm film with stereophonic tracks, it was the most expensive film ever made at that time. The nine-minute chariot race, for example, took six months to film.

Ben-Hur became a great box office success. Wyler won his third Academy Award for Best Director and Charlton Heston his first and only Academy Award as its star. Heston recalled in his autobiography that at first he had doubts about playing the role. But his agent advised him otherwise: "Don't you know that actors take parts with Wyler without even reading the damn script? I'm telling you, you have to do this picture!"

Kirk Douglas had lobbied Wyler, who directed him in Detective Story in 1951, for the title role, but only after Wyler had already decided on Heston. He offered him instead the role of Messala, which Douglas rejected. Douglas then went on to star in Spartacus (1960).

Ben-Hur cost $15 million to produce but earned $47 million by the end of 1961 and $90 million worldwide. Audiences mobbed movie theaters in the months after it opened. Critic Pauline Kael praised Wyler's achievement:

I admire the artist who can make something good for the art house audience; but I also applaud the commercial heroism of a director who can steer a huge production and keep his sanity and perspective and decent human feelings beautifully intact.

=== 1960–1970: Later work and final films ===
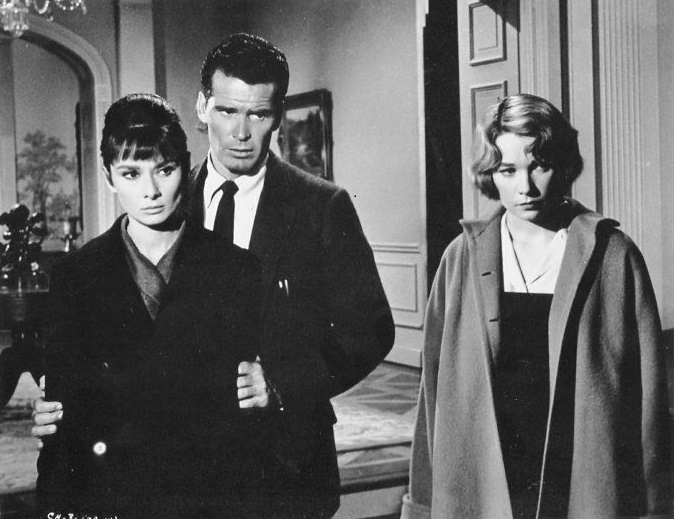
Audrey Hepburn, James Garner and Shirley MacLaine in The Children's Hour (1961)

In 1961, he became a director for 20th Century Fox and also cast James Garner in The Children's Hour with Audrey Hepburn and Shirley MacLaine. Garner had beaten Warner Bros. in a lawsuit, enabling him to leave the television series Maverick, and had been briefly graylisted as a result but Wyler broke the graylist by casting him; the following year, Garner played a leading role in four major motion pictures.

In 1968, he directed Barbra Streisand in her debut film, Funny Girl, costarring Omar Sharif, which became a huge financial success. It was nominated for eight Academy Awards, and like Audrey Hepburn in her first starring role, Streisand won as Best Actress, becoming the thirteenth actor to win an Oscar under his direction.

Streisand had already starred in the Broadway musical of Funny Girl, with seven hundred performances. And although she knew the part well, Wyler still had to mold her stage role for the screen. She naturally wanted to be involved in the film's production, often asking Wyler questions, but they got along well. "Things were ironed out when she discovered some of us knew what we were doing," kidded Wyler.

What originally attracted him to direct Streisand was similar to what attracted him to Audrey Hepburn, who had also been new to film audiences. He met with Streisand during her musical run and became excited at the prospect of guiding another new star into an award-winning performance. He sensed and admired that Streisand had the same kind of dedication to being an actress as did Bette Davis, early in her career. "It just needed to be controlled and toned down for the movie camera." Wyler said afterwards, "I'm terribly fond of her. She was very professional, very good, a hard worker, too hard at times. She would work day and night if you would let her. She is absolutely tireless".

Wyler was hired to direct Patton (1970), but quit before the beginning of production in 1969.

The last film Wyler directed was The Liberation of L.B. Jones, released in 1970.

== Style and technique ==
=== Visual style ===
Wyler had worked with cinematographer Gregg Toland for six of his films, mostly in the 1930s. Toland used deep focus photographic technique for most of them, whereby he could keep all objects on the screen, whether foreground or background, in sharp focus at the same time. The technique gives the illusion of depth and therefore makes the scene more true to life.

A perfectionist, Wyler earned the nickname "40-take Wyler". On the set of Jezebel, Wyler forced Henry Fonda through 40 takes of one particular scene, his only guidance being "Again!" after each take. When Fonda asked for more direction, Wyler responded, "It stinks." Similarly, when Charlton Heston quizzed the director about the supposed shortcomings of his performance in Ben-Hur, Wyler simply told Heston "Be better!" However, Heston notes that by the time a scene is done, regardless of how hard it was to do, it always came off well:

The only answer I have is that his taste is impeccable and every actor knows it. Your faith in his taste and what it will do for your performance is what makes casting a Wyler picture a cinch...doing a film for Wyler is like getting the works in a Turkish bath. You darn near drown, but you come out smelling like a rose.

=== Actors' director ===
He helped propel a number of actors to stardom, including finding and directing Audrey Hepburn in her debut starring role, Roman Holiday (1953), and directing Barbra Streisand in her debut film, Funny Girl (1968), with both actresses winning Academy Awards. Olivia de Havilland and Bette Davis both won their second Oscars in Wyler films, de Havilland for The Heiress (1949) and Davis for Jezebel (1938). Davis said Wyler made her a "far, far better actress" than she had ever been, while Laurence Olivier, who received his first Oscar nomination for Wyler's Wuthering Heights (1939), credited Wyler with teaching him how to act for the screen. Wyler's three Best Picture-winning films each featured a Best Actress or Actor Oscar winner – Greer Garson in Mrs Miniver, Fredric March in The Best Years of Our Lives, and Charlton Heston in Ben-Hur. Other popular Wyler films include: The Westerner (1940) with Gary Cooper, The Letter (1940) again with Davis, Detective Story (1951) with Kirk Douglas, Friendly Persuasion (1956) with Cooper and Dorothy McGuire, The Big Country (1958) with Gregory Peck and Heston, The Children's Hour (1961) with Hepburn, Shirley MacLaine and James Garner, and How to Steal a Million (1966) with Hepburn and Peter O'Toole.

== Personal life ==
Wyler was briefly married to actress Margaret Sullavan (from November 25, 1934 – March 13, 1936) and married actress Margaret "Talli" Tallichet on October 23, 1938. The couple remained together until his death. They had five children: Catherine, Judith, William Jr., Melanie and David. Catherine said during an interview that her mother played an important part in his career, often being his "gatekeeper" and his reader of scripts presented to him.

Wyler was a Freemason.

He fluently spoke German, Alsatian, French and English.

=== Death ===
On July 24, 1981, Wyler gave an interview with his daughter, Catherine, for Directed by William Wyler, a PBS documentary about his life and career. Three days later, he died of a heart attack. He is interred at Forest Lawn Memorial-Park in Glendale, California.

== Legacy ==
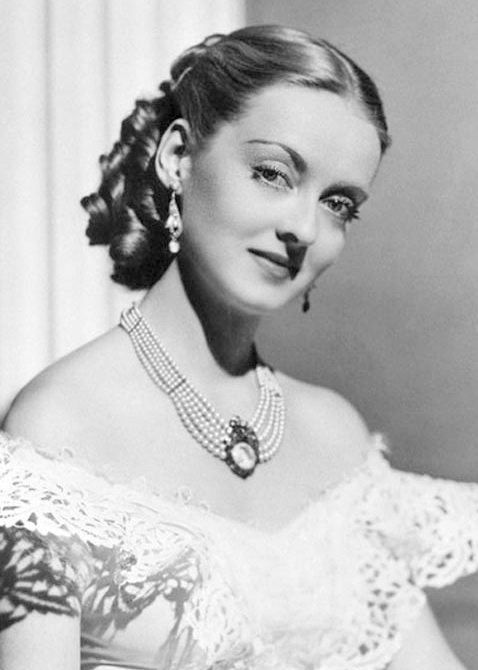
Bette Davis in Jezebel (1938)

Fourteen actors won Oscars under Wyler's direction, including Bette Davis in Jezebel (1938) and her nomination for The Letter (1940). Davis summed up their work together: "It was he who helped me to realize my full potential as an actress. I met my match in this exceptionally creative and talented director."

Other Oscar winners were Olivia de Havilland in The Heiress (1949); Audrey Hepburn in Roman Holiday (1953); Charlton Heston in Ben-Hur (1959); and Barbra Streisand in her debut film, Funny Girl (1968).

Wyler's films garnered more awards for participating artists and actors than any other director in the history of Hollywood. He received 12 Oscar nominations for Best Director, while dozens of his collaborators and actors won Oscars or were nominated. In 1965, Wyler won the Irving G. Thalberg Memorial Award for career achievement. Eleven years later, he received the American Film Institute Life Achievement Award. In addition to his Best Picture and Best Director Oscar wins, 13 of Wyler's films earned Best Picture nominations. Other late Wyler films include The Children's Hour (1961), which was nominated for five Academy Awards. Later films included The Collector (1963), Funny Girl (1968), and his final film, The Liberation of L.B. Jones (1970).

Many of Wyler's home movies are held by the Academy Film Archive; the archive preserved a number of them in 2017.

== Awards and honors ==
Wyler is the most decorated film director in Academy Awards history with twelve nominations, and holds the record for the longest streak with four consecutive Best Director nominations between 1939 and 1942. He won the Academy Award for Best Director on three occasions, for Mrs. Miniver (1942), The Best Years of Our Lives (1946), and Ben-Hur (1959). He is tied with Frank Capra and behind John Ford, who won four Oscars in this category. He is also the only director in Academy history to direct three Best Picture-winning films (the three for which he won Best Director), and shares with Steven Spielberg the record for directing the greatest number of Best Picture nominees (thirteen).

He has the distinction of having directed more actors to Oscar-nominated performances than any other director in history: thirty-six. Out of these nominees, fourteen went on to win Oscars, also a record. He received the fourth AFI Life Achievement Award in 1976. Among those who thanked him for directing her in her debut film was Barbra Streisand. For his contributions to the motion picture industry, on February 8, 1960, Wyler has a star on the Hollywood Walk of Fame at 1731 Vine Street. In 1961, Wyler was chosen as one of 50 outstanding Americans of meritorious performance in the fields of endeavor, to be honored as a Guest of Honor to the first annual Banquet of the Golden Plate in Monterey, California. The honor was awarded by vote of the National Panel of Distinguished Americans of the Academy of Achievement.

Awards and nominations received by Wyler's features
Year	Title	Academy Awards		BAFTA Awards		Golden Globe Awards	
Year	Title	Nominations	Wins	Nominations	Wins	Nominations	Wins
1936	Dodsworth	7	1				
1936	Come and Get It	2	1				
1937	Dead End	4					
1938	Jezebel	5	2				
1939	Wuthering Heights	8	1				
1940	The Westerner	3	1				
1940	The Letter	7					
1941	The Little Foxes	9					
1942	Mrs. Miniver	12	6				
1946	The Best Years of Our Lives	8	7	1	1	2	2
1949	The Heiress	8	4			3	1
1951	Detective Story	4			3		
1952	Carrie	2		2			
1953	Roman Holiday	10	3	4	1	1	1
1956	Friendly Persuasion	6				4	1
1958	The Big Country	2	1	1		1	1
1959	Ben-Hur	12	11	1	1	4	3
1961	The Children's Hour	5			3		
1965	The Collector	3				4	1
1968	Funny Girl	8	1	3		4	1
1970	The Liberation of L.B. Jones					1	
Total		118	38	12	9	24	11

== See also ==
- List of Academy Award records
- List of superlative Academy Award winners and nominees
- List of Golden Globe winners
