= A House Divided (1931 film) =

1931 film

- Directed by: William Wyler
- Screenplay by: John B. Clymer; John Huston; Dale Van Every
- Based on: "Head and Heart" by Olive Edens
- Produced by: Paul Kohner; Carl Laemmle Jr.
- Starring: Walter Huston; Douglass Montgomery; Helen Chandler; Vivien Oakland
- Cinematography: Charles J. Stumar
- Edited by: Ted J. Kent
- Music by: Irving Bibo
- Production company: Universal Pictures
- Distributed by: Universal Pictures
- Release date: December 4, 1931
- Running time: 70 minutes
- Country: United States
- Language: English

A House Divided is a 1931 American Pre-Code drama film directed by William Wyler and starring Walter Huston, Douglass Montgomery (billed as Kent Douglass) and Helen Chandler. It was produced and released by Universal Pictures.

== Plot ==
Widowed fisherman Seth Law falls in love with and marries Ruth Evans, a younger woman who falls in love with the man's son Matt.

== Cast ==
- Walter Huston as Seth Law
- Douglass Montgomery as Matt Law
- Helen Chandler as Ruth Evans
- Mary Foy as Mary
- Lloyd Ingraham as Doctor
- Charles Middleton as Minister
- Frank Hagney as Big Bill
- Richard Alexander as Sailor
- Walter Brennan as Musician
- Mary Gordon as Townswoman
- Gibson Gowland as Bartender
- Marjorie Main as Townswoman at Wedding
- Vivien Oakland as Bess
- Rose Plumer as Wedding Guest
