= Dead End (1937 film) =

Film by William Wyler

- Theatrical release poster
- Directed by: William Wyler
- Screenplay by: Lillian Hellman
- Based on: Dead End; 1935 play by Sidney Kingsley
- Produced by: Samuel Goldwyn
- Starring: Sylvia Sidney; Joel McCrea; Humphrey Bogart; Wendy Barrie; Claire Trevor; Allen Jenkins
- Cinematography: Gregg Toland
- Edited by: Daniel Mandell
- Music by: Alfred Newman
- Production company: Samuel Goldwyn Productions
- Distributed by: United Artists
- Release date: August 27, 1937 (U.S.)
- Running time: 93 minutes
- Country: United States
- Language: English
- Budget: $900,000 (est)

Dead End is a 1937 American crime drama film directed by William Wyler. It is an adaptation of the Sidney Kingsley 1935 Broadway play of the same name. It stars Sylvia Sidney, Joel McCrea, Humphrey Bogart, Wendy Barrie, and Claire Trevor. It was the first film appearance of the acting group known as the Dead End Kids.

== Plot ==
In the slums of New York City, on the East River just below the Queensboro Bridge, wealthy people live in opulent and luxurious apartments because of the picturesque views of the river, while the destitute and poor live nearby in crowded, cockroach-infested tenements.

At the end of the street is a dock on the East River; to the left are the luxury apartments, and to the right are the slums. The Dead End Kids, led by Tommy Gordon, are a gang of street urchins who are already well on the path to a life of petty crime. Members of the gang besides Tommy include Dippy, Angel, Spit, T.B., and Milty, the new kid on the block in search of friends. Spit is a bit malicious with a cruel streak, and initially bullies the newcomer and takes his pocket change. However, Tommy eventually lets Milty join the gang, and he turns out to be both a loyal and generous friend.

Tommy's sister, Drina, dreams of marrying some dashing, rich stranger, who will save Tommy and her from this miserable life of poverty, and help prevent Tommy from growing up to be a mobster like Hugh "Baby Face" Martin, who has returned to the neighborhood with his partner Hunk to visit his mother and childhood girlfriend. Dave Connell, raised on the same street as Martin, recognizes him and warns him to stay away, but Martin contemptuously ignores him. Dave, a frustrated architect who currently works odd jobs, is Drina's childhood friend. He is having an affair with a rich man's mistress, Kay Burton. Although Dave and Kay love each other, they know they cannot be together because Dave cannot provide Kay with the kind of lifestyle she desires.

Meanwhile, the kids lure Philip, a rich kid from the apartments, into a cellar, where they beat and rob him. When the boy's father, the brother of a judge, tries to intervene, Tommy winds up stabbing him in the arm. He escapes the police and goes into hiding.

Martin is rejected by his mother, who denounces him as a murderer, and repulsed by his ex-girlfriend, Francey, who says she is tired and "sick". He realizes she is now a prostitute and dismisses her with a few twenties pulled from a wad of cash. Despondent over the failed visit, he decides to kidnap the rich child for ransom to make the trip back worthwhile. Dave sees Martin and his accomplices planning the kidnapping, and again warns him to leave. Martin knifes him, and Hunk pushes him into the river. Managing to pull himself out of the river, Dave pursues the hoodlums, knocking out Hunk and chasing Martin on the rooftops before cornering him on a fire escape. Amid a hail of bullets, he manages to mortally wound Martin, who falls onto the street below. While on the ground, Martin engages oncoming police officers in a firefight, shooting a couple before they open fire and kill him.

As the police and a crowd of people gather around Martin's body, the doorman recognizes Spit as a member of the gang that attacked the rich kid's father, and identifies him to Officer Mulligan. Spit exonerates himself by informing the police that the man was cut by Tommy, who has returned to say goodbye to Drina before running away.

Meanwhile, Kay approaches Dave, asking him to go away with her, using the reward money that he is owed for killing Martin. Dave refuses, and Kay returns to the man whom she does not love, but who can provide her with financial security.

Tommy hears of Spit's betrayal, and tries to give him the mark of the "squealer", which is a knife wound across the cheek. Before he can do so, Dave intervenes, and Drina and he convince Tommy to surrender to the police. Dave then offers to use his reward money to pay for Tommy's defense. As Drina, Dave, and Tommy leave with Mulligan, the rest of the Dead End Kids meander off into the night, singing "If I had the wings of an angel, over these prison walls I would fly".

== Cast ==
- Sylvia Sidney as Drina Gordon
- Joel McCrea as Dave Connell
- Humphrey Bogart as Hugh "Baby Face" Martin
- Wendy Barrie as Kay Burton
- Claire Trevor as Francey
- Allen Jenkins as Hunk
- Marjorie Main as Mrs. Martin
- Charles Peck as Philip Griswald
- Minor Watson as Mr. Griswald
- James Burke as Officer Mulligan
- Ward Bond as Doorman
- Elisabeth Risdon as Mrs. Connell
- Esther Dale as Mrs. Fenner
- George Humbert as Pascagli
- Marcelle Corday as Governess
- Charles Halton as Whitey
- Billy Halop as Tommy Gordon
- Huntz Hall as Dippy
- Bobby Jordan as Angel
- Leo B. Gorcey as Spit
- Gabriel Dell as T.B.
- Bernard Punsly as Milton 'Milty'
- Red Skelton as paramedic/doctor (uncredited)

== Production ==
Goldwyn wanted George Raft to play the gangster, but he turned it down, saying the part was too unsympathetic. Dead End was filmed from May 4 through mid-July 1937 on a single enormous set.

Robert Osborne, film historian, stated that Joel McCrea had a tough time working with Humphrey Bogart, especially during the scene "on the rooftop, guns ready, and standing very close to each other. During the filming of that scene, McCrea kept flinching, and the director William Wyler had to keep doing more takes. Finally, Wyler pulled McCrea aside, and he asked him what was wrong. McCrea, embarrassed to tell him, explained that Bogart kept spitting in his face when he (Bogart) was speaking, not exactly what Wyler was expecting to hear or to be the problem. Happens with actors more than you can imagine."

== Counterparts in actuality ==
The stage directions to the play indicate that Rockefeller Center can be seen in the distance, which would place the location of the pier around 50th Street in Manhattan. In the movie, the location is made more definite as 53rd Street, adjoining a luxury building that is obviously the River House, which was and is at that location.

The actual Dead End was the corner of East 53rd Street and the East River. Sutton Place South runs north from East 53rd Street at that corner. The producers of the play and movie made a painstaking effort to recreate that very area in the stage scenery. The River House at the end of East 53rd Street closely resembles the Griswalds' house in the play and movie. One can find traces of some of the locales in Dead End in that area, however, the pier and tenements are gone and the Dead End is now part of Sutton Place Park and Exit 11 of FDR Drive.

The official name of the "Dead End" Kids is on the brick wall in chalk behind the boys as they play cards. This wall and the inscription are shown in several scenes throughout the film. The graffiti reads: E 54th Place Gang Member Only.

Writing in The New York Times, Carter B. Horsley said of the River House: "Erected in 1931 when its area still teemed with tenements, it was mocked in the famous and popular 1936 movie, Dead End that was Lillian Hellman's adaptation of Sidney Kingsley's play."

== Reception ==
Writing for Night and Day in 1937, Graham Greene gave the film a good review, characterizing it as "one of the best pictures of the year". While voicing mild complaints that the film "gives too melodramatic a tone", Greene lavished praise on the "fine flexible direction" and the acting of Humphrey Bogart for which Greene called "the finest performance Bogart has ever given".

=== Awards and honors ===
Dead End was nominated for the Academy Award for Best Picture, Best Art Direction (Richard Day), Academy Award for Best Cinematography (Gregg Toland) and Best Supporting Actress (Claire Trevor).

In 2008, the American Film Institute nominated this film for its Top 10 Gangster Films list.

== Legacy ==
The group of young actors from New York City who appeared in Sidney Kingsley's Broadway play Dead End in 1935 had been brought to Hollywood by producer Samuel Goldwyn to appear in this film version. They proved to be so popular as the "Dead End Kids" that they continued to make more than 60 movies under various monikers, including the Little Tough Guys, the East Side Kids, and the Bowery Boys, for 20 years until 1958.

== Home media ==
The film was released on VHS and Beta in 1985 by Embassy Home Entertainment and on DVD on March 8, 2005 by MGM.
