= Detective Story (1951 film) =

1951 film by William Wyler

- Theatrical release poster
- Directed by: William Wyler
- Screenplay by: Robert Wyler; Philip Yordan
- Based on: Detective Story; 1949 play by Sidney Kingsley
- Produced by: William Wyler
- Starring: Kirk Douglas; Eleanor Parker; William Bendix; Cathy O'Donnell
- Cinematography: Lee Garmes; John F. Seitz (uncredited)
- Edited by: Robert Swink
- Distributed by: Paramount Pictures
- Release date: November 6, 1951 (New York)
- Running time: 103 minutes
- Country: United States
- Language: English
- Budget: $1.5 million
- Box office: $2.8 million (rentals)

Detective Story is a 1951 American crime drama film noir directed by William Wyler and starring Kirk Douglas that tells the story of one day in the lives of the various people who populate a police detective squad. The ensemble supporting cast features Eleanor Parker, William Bendix, Cathy O'Donnell and George Macready, and Lee Grant and Joseph Wiseman play large roles in their film debuts. The film was adapted by Robert Wyler and Philip Yordan from the 1949 play by Sidney Kingsley. It was nominated for four Academy Awards, including Academy Award for Best Director for Wyler, Best Actress for Parker and Best Supporting Actress for Grant.

== Plot ==
Detective Jim McLeod, whose violent criminal father drove his mother to insanity, nurtures a lifelong hatred of lawbreakers and is convinced that he has a flawless instinct for identifying criminals. He maintains a particular contempt for Dr. Karl Schneider, whom McLeod is convinced has performed illegal abortions that have resulted in the deaths of both women and their babies. McLeod has persuaded Schneider's assistant to implicate him in a police lineup. However, Schneider bribes her not to identify him, infuriating McLeod.

Several other cases are being processed in the bullpen. The detectives have arrested burglar Charley Gennini, who is revealed to be a psychopath with an extensive criminal record, including murder and rape. McLeod also books a young man named Arthur Kindred who has admitted to stealing money from his employer to try to impress the girl whom he loves. Although the employer is sympathetic and wants to drop charges after he is repaid, McLeod refuses to release the remorseful Kindred, saying that leniency only leads to more crime. Despite evidence of Kindred's kind nature, McLeod is unwilling to distinguish between a first-time offender like Kindred and a dangerous repeat offender like Gennini.

McLeod misses another chance to establish Schneider's guilt when a victim dies in the hospital. Schneider boasts that he has sensitive knowledge about McLeod, who finally explodes in anger and brutally attacks him, requiring McLeod's commanding officer Lt. Monaghan to escort Schneider to the hospital in an ambulance. Schneider, half-conscious, mentions the name Giacoppetti in connection with a woman supposedly linked with McLeod.

When Schneider's lawyer Endicott Sims arrives to protest the incident, he inadvertently discloses that the woman to whom Schneider was referring is McLeod's wife Mary. Monaghan has Mary brought to the station and interviews her in private. She denies any connections until Monaghan invites Giacoppetti to enter and he greets her by name.

Mary admits to her husband that years ago she had become pregnant by Giacoppetti. McLeod, who had been worried about her apparent infertility, is disgusted by the thought that it was caused by her abortion by Schneider, especially when Sims hints that there may have been more lovers. After McLeod accuses her of infidelity, Mary tells him that he is cruel like his father was and leaves him. Gennini suddenly takes advantage of a distraction to steal an officer's revolver, and he fatally shoots McLeod before being disarmed. Dying, McLeod instructs his partner to release Kindred and to tell his wife that he begs her forgiveness. The local paper praises McLeod for dying in the line of duty.

== Cast ==
- Kirk Douglas as Detective Jim McLeod
- Eleanor Parker as Mary McLeod
- William Bendix as Detective Lou Brody
- Cathy O'Donnell as Susan Carmichael
- George Macready as Dr. Karl Schneider
- Horace McMahon as Lt. Monoghan
- Gladys George as Miss Hatch
- Joseph Wiseman as Charley Gennini, a burglar
- Lee Grant as Shoplifter
- Gerald Mohr as Tami Giacoppetti
- Frank Faylen as Detective Gallagher
- Craig Hill as Arthur Kindred
- Michael Strong as Lewis Abbott
- Luis Van Rooten as Joe Feinson
- Bert Freed as Detective Dakis
- Warner Anderson as Endicott Sims, lawyer
- Grandon Rhodes as Detective O'Brien
- William "Bill" Phillips as Detective Pat Callahan
- Russell Evans as Patrolman Steve Barnes
- Burt Mustin as Willy the Janitor (uncredited)

== Production ==
Paramount bought the film rights to the story in 1949 for $285,000, plus a percentage of the profits. Alan Ladd was the first star linked to the project.

During production, the film had some trouble with the Motion Picture Production Code, as plotlines involving the killing of police officers or references to abortion were not permitted. Joseph Breen suggested that explicit references to abortion would be altered to "baby farming". However, when the film was released, many film critics interpreted Dr. Schneider as an illicit abortionist. Breen and William Wyler suggested to the MPAA Production Code Committee that the code be amended to allow the killing of police officers if it was absolutely necessary for the plot. They agreed, and the code was amended, lifting the previous ban.

== Reception ==
In a contemporary review for The New York Times, critic Bosley Crowther wrote:

Sidney Kingsley's play, "Detective Story," has been made into a brisk, absorbing film by Producer-Director William Wyler, with the help of a fine, responsive cast. Long on graphic demonstration of the sort of raffish traffic that flows through a squad-room of plainclothes detectives in a New York police station-house and considerably short on penetration into the lives of anyone on display. ... In the performance of this business, every member of the cast rates a hand, with the possible exception of Eleanor Parker as the hero's wife, and she is really not to blame. Kirk Douglas is so forceful and aggressive as the detective with a kink in his brain that the sweet and conventional distractions of Miss Parker as his wife appear quite tame. In the role of the mate of such a tiger—and of a woman who has had the troubled past that is harshly revealed in this picture—Mr. Wyler might have cast a sharper dame."

=== Awards and nominations ===
Award	Category	Nominee(s)	Result
Academy Awards	Best Director	William Wyler	Nominated
Academy Awards	Best Actress	Eleanor Parker	Nominated
Academy Awards	Best Supporting Actress	Lee Grant	Nominated
Academy Awards	Best Screenplay	Philip Yordan and Robert Wyler	Nominated
Argentine Academy of Cinematography Arts and Sciences	Silver Condor		Special Mention
British Academy Film Awards	Best Film from any Source		Nominated
Cannes Film Festival	Grand Prix	William Wyler	Nominated
Cannes Film Festival	Best Actress	Lee Grant	Won
Directors Guild of America Awards	Outstanding Directorial Achievement in Motion Pictures	William Wyler	Nominated
Edgar Allan Poe Awards	Best Motion Picture Screenplay	Philip Yordan, Robert Wyler and Sidney Kingsley	Won
Golden Globe Awards	Best Motion Picture – Drama		Nominated
Golden Globe Awards	Best Actor in a Motion Picture – Drama	Kirk Douglas	Nominated
Golden Globe Awards	Best Supporting Actress – Motion Picture	Lee Grant	Nominated
Laurel Awards	Top Male Dramatic Performance	Kirk Douglas	Won
National Board of Review Awards	Top Ten Films		5th Place
Picturegoer Awards	Best Actor	Kirk Douglas	Won
Writers Guild of America Awards	Best Written American Drama	Philip Yordan and Robert Wyler	Nominated

== Radio adaptation ==
On April 26, 1954, a one-hour adaptation of Detective Story was presented on Lux Radio Theatre on CBS Radio. Douglas and Parker reprised their roles in the adaptation.
