= The Letter (1940 film) =

1940 American crime drama film directed by William Wyler

- Theatrical release poster
- Directed by: William Wyler
- Screenplay by: Howard E. Koch
- Based on: The Letter; 1927 play by W. Somerset Maugham
- Produced by: Hal B. Wallis (Exec)
- Starring: Bette Davis; Herbert Marshall; James Stephenson
- Cinematography: Tony Gaudio
- Edited by: George Amy; Warren Low
- Music by: Max Steiner
- Distributed by: Warner Bros. Pictures
- Release date: November 22, 1940 (New York City)
- Running time: 95 minutes
- Country: United States
- Languages: English, Cantonese

The Letter is a 1940 American crime film noir melodrama directed by William Wyler, and starring Bette Davis, Herbert Marshall and James Stephenson. The screenplay by Howard E. Koch is based on the 1927 play of the same name by W. Somerset Maugham, derived from his own short story. The play was first filmed in 1929 by director Jean de Limur, starring Jeanne Eagels.

The story was inspired by a real-life scandal involving the Eurasian wife of the headmaster of a school in Kuala Lumpur; she was convicted in a murder trial after shooting dead a male friend in April 1911. She was pardoned by the local sultan after a public furor.

== Plot ==
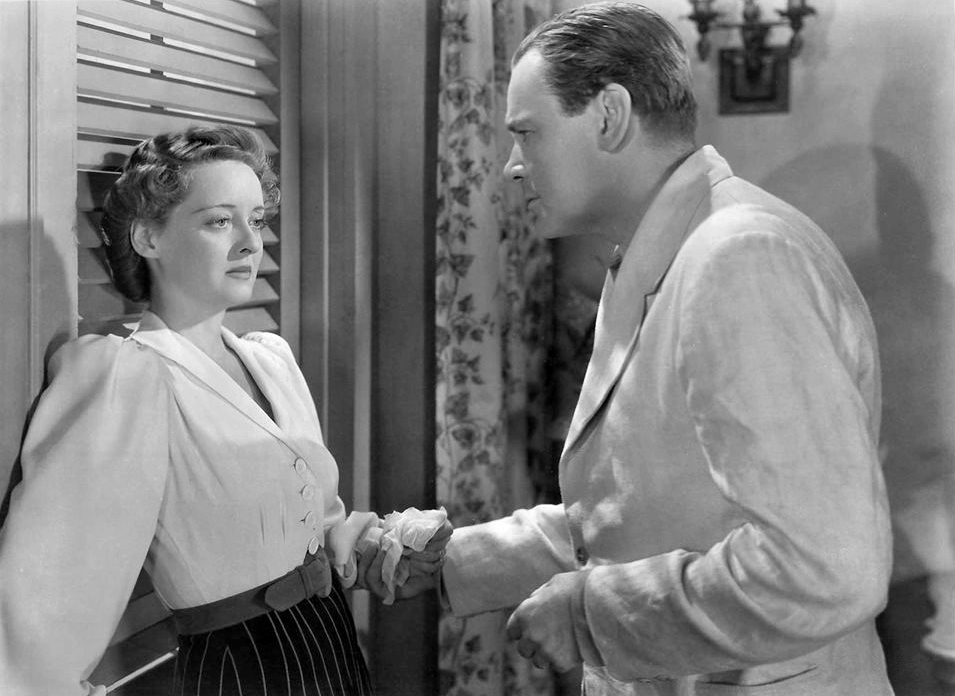
Bette Davis and Herbert Marshall in The Letter

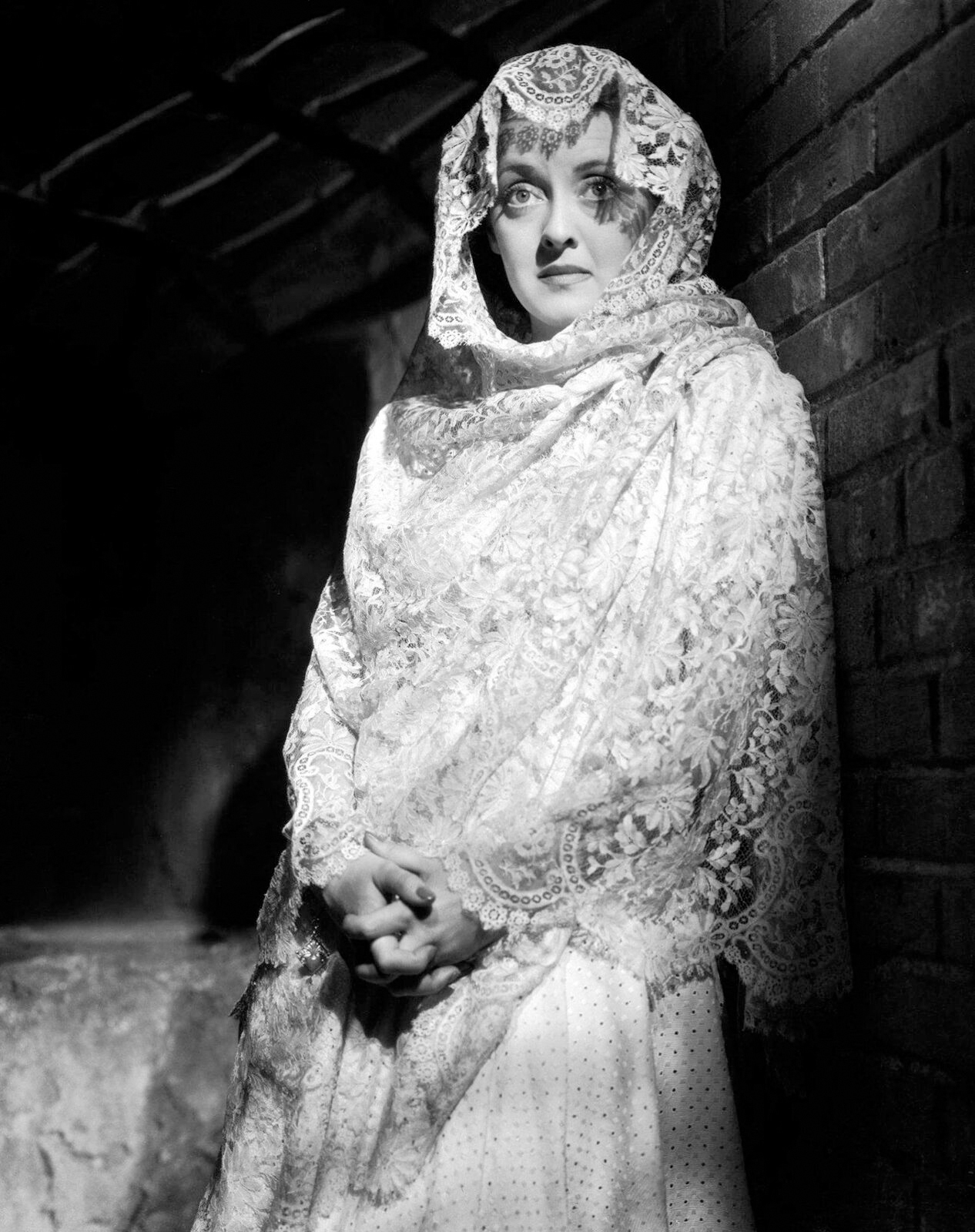
Bette Davis as Leslie Crosbie

Leslie Crosbie, the wife of a British rubber plantation manager in Malaya, shoots dead Geoffrey Hammond, a well-known member of the expatriate community. Leslie tells the servant to send for the new district officer and her husband Robert, who is loading rubber for shipment. Crosbie returns, delivered by his attorney, a close family friend. Leslie claims that she killed Hammond to save her honor. She is placed under arrest, jailed in Singapore, and charged with murder. Her eventual acquittal seems a foregone conclusion, as the White community not only believes her story but feels she had acted heroically. Only the attorney, Howard Joyce, harbors suspicion. His clerk, Ong Chi Seng, tells him a letter exists that Leslie wrote to Hammond the day of the shooting, imploring him to come that night while Robert was away.

Ong tells Joyce that the original is in the possession of Hammond's widow, a Eurasian woman who lives in the Chinese quarter. He shows Joyce a copy, revealing Leslie's clear culpability in her ex-lover's murder, and conveys that the original is for sale at a staggering price. Joyce confronts Leslie, who first denies, then breaks down and confesses to having written it. She manipulates him into agreeing to buy it back despite the risk to his career.

Joyce tells Robert about the letter without divulging its content or true price, which will exhaust nearly all of Robert's savings. Ong informs Joyce that Hammond's widow demands Leslie come personally to make the payoff, so Joyce arranges for the court to have her released into his custody to "regain her health".

In the Chinese quarter, Leslie obtains the letter from the angry widow. She is acquitted.

In the aftermath of the trial, Robert announces to Leslie and Joyce that he plans to buy a rubber plantation in Sumatra to give him and Leslie a fresh start. It will require all his savings, plus a mortgage, but he can hardly contain his excitement. Joyce informs him of the true cost of the letter, which Robert insists on reading. He is devastated to learn that Leslie had lied about the killing and had been unfaithful with Hammond for years.

As a party celebrating the acquittal gets underway, Leslie discovers a dagger on her porch which she recognizes from the shop where she retrieved the letter. Immediately aware of the implication, she nevertheless joins the party before retreating to her room to lose herself in her lacework. Robert brags to his friends about his Sumatran fantasy, but collapses in gin and misery.

Robert offers to forgive Leslie if she can swear her love to him. She does, but then abruptly confesses that she still loves Hammond.

Robert rushes from the room. Opening the door to the garden, Leslie sees the dagger is now gone. She recognizes the inevitability of her fate, and ghosts down the garden path toward it. Outside the gate, Leslie is grabbed from behind and held by her own manservant while Hammond's widow stabs her with the dagger.

The two murderers attempt to slip away, but are stopped within steps by the flashlight of a policeman, who leads them silently away.

== Cast ==
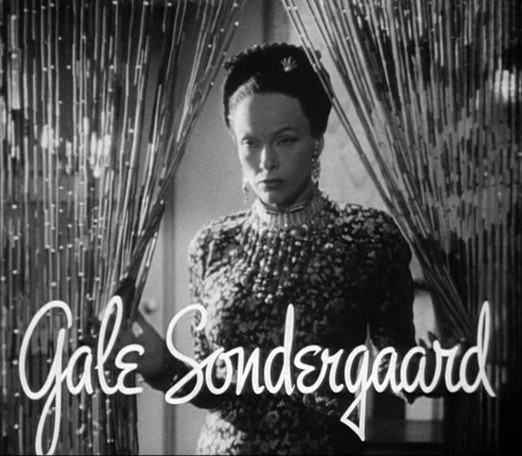
Gale Sondergaard as the widow of Geoffrey Hammond in the trailer for The Letter (1940)

- Bette Davis as Leslie Crosbie
- Herbert Marshall as Robert Crosbie
- James Stephenson as Howard Joyce
- Frieda Inescort as Dorothy Joyce
- Gale Sondergaard as Mrs. Hammond
- Bruce Lester as John Withers
- Elizabeth Earl as Adele Ainsworth
- Cecil Kellaway as Prescott
- Sen Yung as Ong Chi Seng
- Doris Lloyd as Mrs. Cooper
- Willie Fung as Chung Hi
- Tetsu Komai as Head Boy

== Production ==
The Production Code Administration rejected the original story adaptation that Warner Bros. Pictures submitted on the grounds that it contained adultery and unpunished murder, so a new final scene was added in which the widow Hammond takes her revenge. The character of Mrs. Hammond was also changed from Hammond's Chinese mistress to his Eurasian wife to placate the Hays code.

Director William Wyler and star Bette Davis, who had previously worked together on Jezebel, disagreed about the climactic scene in which Leslie admits to her husband she still loves the man she murdered. Davis felt no woman could look at her husband when she admits such a thing. Wyler disagreed, and Davis walked off the set. She later returned and did it Wyler's way, but ever after, Davis insisted her approach would have been better.

Wyler also argued with Warner Bros. head Jack L. Warner over the casting of British actor James Stephenson as attorney Howard Joyce. Warner originally had suggested Stephenson for the role, but after Wyler cast him, the studio head had second thoughts and thought the role was too important to cast an unknown in it. Wyler stood firm, and Stephenson's performance earned him an Oscar nomination.

Herbert Marshall also appeared in the 1929 version, in which he plays the lover who is killed by Leslie. The 1940 film begins with the shooting. The 1929 version opens with the confrontation between Leslie and Geoff that preceded it.

== Reception ==
The film was a huge hit with the public, and received seven Academy Award nominations (for Outstanding Production, Best Director, Best Actress (Davis), Best Supporting Actor (Stephenson), Best Cinematography – Black and White, Best Film Editing, and Best Original Score), but failed to win any.

=== Critical response ===
In his review in The New York Times, Bosley Crowther observed, "The ultimate credit for as taut and insinuating a melodrama as has come along this year — a film which extenuates tension like a grim inquisitor's rack—must be given to Mr. Wyler. His hand is patent throughout . . . Miss Davis is a strangely cool and calculating killer who conducts herself with reserve and yet implies a deep confusion of emotions . . . Only the end of The Letter is weak — and that is because of the postscript which the Hays Office has compelled".

Variety magazine wrote, "Never has [the W. Somerset Maugham play] been done with greater production values, a better all-around cast or finer direction. Its defect is its grimness. Director William Wyler, however, sets himself a tempo which is in rhythm with the Malay locale . . . Davis' frigidity at times seems to go even beyond the characterization. On the other hand, Marshall never falters. Virtually stealing these honors in the pic, however, is Stephenson as the attorney, while Sondergaard is the perfect mask-like threat".

Time Out London said in 2012, "A superbly crafted melodrama, even if it never manages to top the moody montage with which it opens - moon scudding behind clouds, rubber dripping from a tree, coolies dozing in the compound, a startled cockatoo - as a shot rings out, a man staggers out onto the verandah, and Davis follows to empty her gun grimly into his body . . . [The] camerawork, almost worthy of Sternberg in its evocation of sultry Singapore nights and cool gin slings, is not matched by natural sounds (on the soundtrack Max Steiner's score does a lot of busy underlining).

The Letter holds a perfect 100% fresh rating on Rotten Tomatoes based on 15 reviews, with an average rating of 8.40/10.

=== Accolades ===
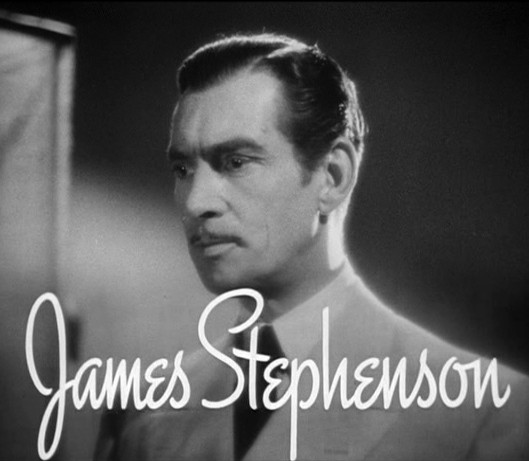
James Stephenson as attorney Howard Joyce

The film is recognized by American Film Institute in these lists:

- 2003: AFI's 100 Years...100 Heroes & Villains:
  - Leslie Crosbie – Nominated Villain

Award	Category	Nominee(s)	Result
Academy Awards	Outstanding Production	Hal B. Wallis (for Warner Bros.)	Nominated
Academy Awards	Best Director	William Wyler	Nominated
Academy Awards	Best Actress	Bette Davis	Nominated
Academy Awards	Best Supporting Actor	James Stephenson	Nominated
Academy Awards	Best Cinematography – Black and White	Tony Gaudio	Nominated
Academy Awards	Best Film Editing	Warren Low	Nominated
Academy Awards	Best Original Score	Max Steiner	Nominated
National Board of Review Awards	Best Acting	James Stephenson (also for Shining Victory)	Won
New York Film Critics Circle Awards	Best Director	William Wyler	Nominated
New York Film Critics Circle Awards	Best Actor	James Stephenson	Nominated

== See also ==
- Ethel Proudlock case
- Pasar Seni station
