= Jezebel (1938 film) =

1938 film by William Wyler

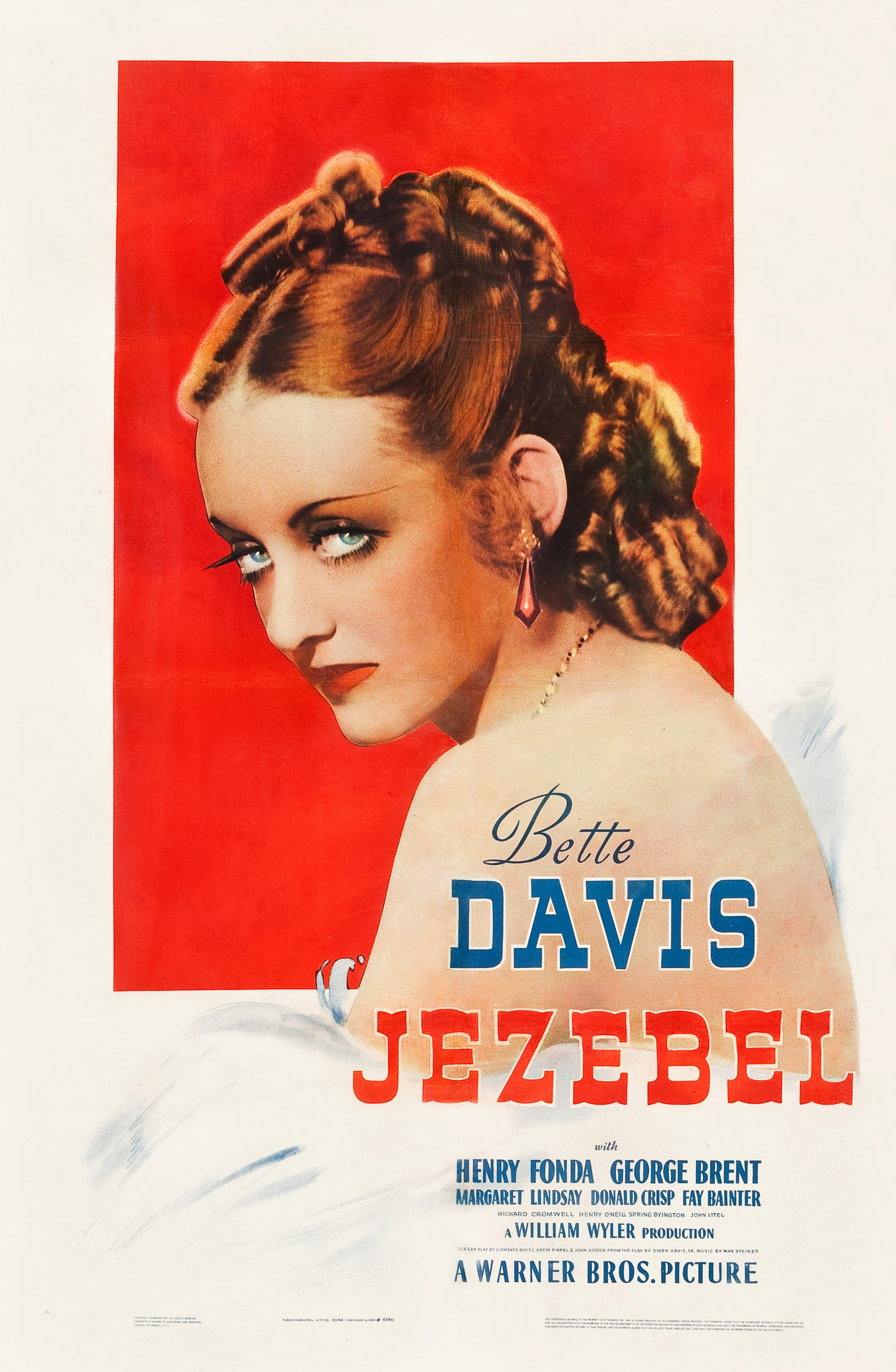
- Theatrical release poster
- Directed by: William Wyler
- Screenplay by: Clements Ripley; Abem Finkel; John Huston
- Based on: Jezebel (1933 play) by Owen Davis Sr.
- Produced by: William Wyler
- Starring: Bette Davis; Henry Fonda; George Brent; Margaret Lindsay; Donald Crisp; Fay Bainter; Richard Cromwell; Henry O'Neill; Spring Byington; John Litel
- Cinematography: Ernest Haller
- Edited by: Warren Low
- Music by: Max Steiner
- Production company: Warner Bros. Pictures
- Distributed by: Warner Bros. Pictures
- Release dates: March 10, 1938 (New York City); March 26, 1938 (United States)
- Running time: 103 minutes
- Country: United States
- Language: English
- Budget: $1.25 million

Jezebel is a 1938 American romantic drama film released by Warner Bros. Pictures and directed by William Wyler. It stars Bette Davis and Henry Fonda, with George Brent, Margaret Lindsay, Donald Crisp, Fay Bainter, Richard Cromwell, Henry O'Neill, and Spring Byington in supporting roles.

The screenplay was adapted by Clements Ripley, Abem Finkel, and John Huston from the 1933 play by Owen Davis Sr. The film tells the story of Julie Marsden, a headstrong, young woman during the Antebellum period whose actions cost her Preston Dillard, the man she loves.

In 2009, Jezebel was selected for preservation in the National Film Registry by the Library of Congress, deemed "culturally, historically or aesthetically significant".

== Plot ==
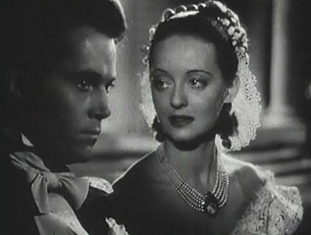
Fonda and Davis in a trailer for the film

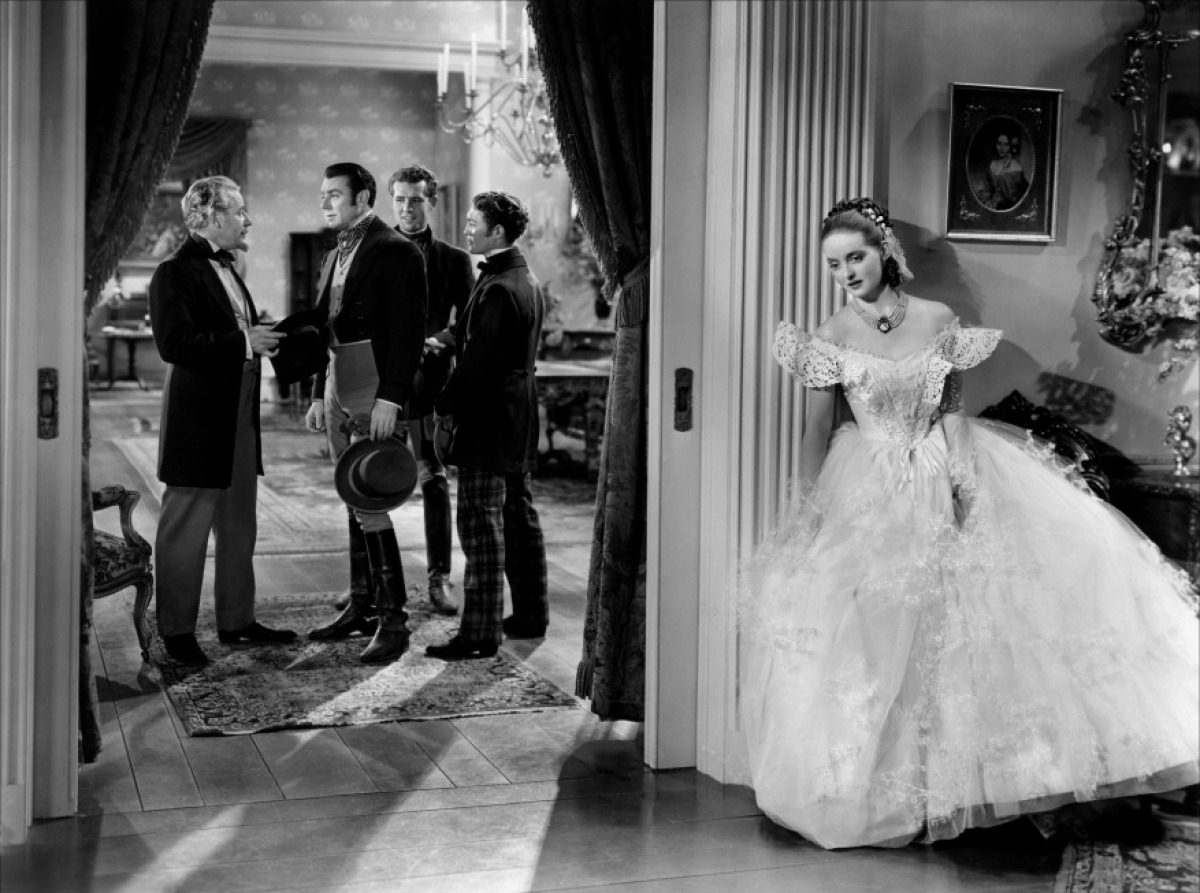
Julie waiting to see Pres on his return from the North

In 1852 New Orleans, spoiled, strong-willed belle Julie Marsden is engaged to banker Preston "Pres" Dillard. In retaliation for Pres refusing to leave an important business meeting to accompany her to the last fitting of her ball gown, Julie buys a brazen red satin dress. The Olympus Ball is the most important social event of the year, and unmarried women are expected to wear virginal white. All of Julie's friends are shocked by her choice of red, but no one can dissuade her from wearing it.

At the ball, Julie's attire is met with shock and disgust by all. She begs Pres to take her away, but instead he forces her to dance with him while the other couples abandon the floor. Pres later leaves Julie, implicitly breaking their engagement. In a final act of spite, Julie slaps him in the face. He later goes north on business, and Julie secludes herself at home.

A year later, Pres returns, and Julie comes back to life. She plans a celebratory homecoming party in his honor and prepares to humble herself before him. What Julie does not know is that Pres is accompanied by his new wife Amy Bradford. Stung, Julie prods her longtime admirer, skilled duelist Buck Cantrell, to quarrel with Pres. The scheme goes awry as Pres's younger brother Ted is goaded into challenging Buck. Julie tries to get Buck to skip the duel, but to no avail. To everyone's surprise, it is Buck who is killed.

In the meantime, a deadly yellow fever epidemic breaks out in New Orleans. The people fight it with cannon and smoke. They believe the fever is highly contagious, and a rigid quarantine mandates that those trying to escape the city be shot. Pres is stricken and is ordered to be sent to the leper colony on Lazaret Island. Julie sneaks into the city to nurse Pres. Later, the family arrives, having been granted a pass to enter New Orleans.

When the leper wagon comes to pick up Pres, his wife Amy begs to accompany him, but Julie tells her that she is too unfamiliar with Southern culture to be able to deal with the desperate conditions and people there. Julie begs to go in her place to try to redeem herself. Before agreeing, Amy asks if Pres still loves Julie. Julie finally admits the truth and declares that Pres only loves his wife. Amy blesses them, and Julie accompanies Pres on a wagon loaded with other victims and caregivers.

== Cast ==
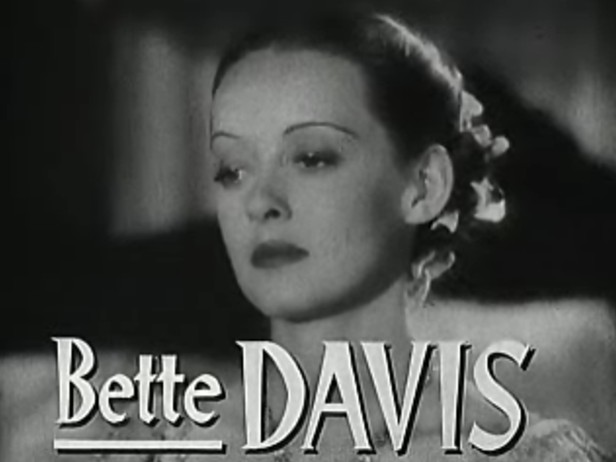
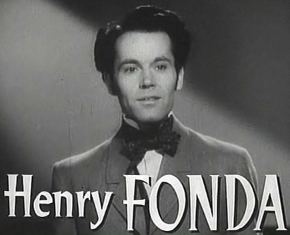
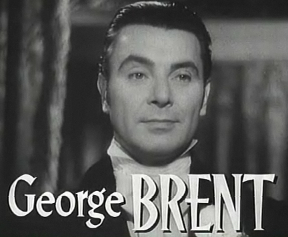
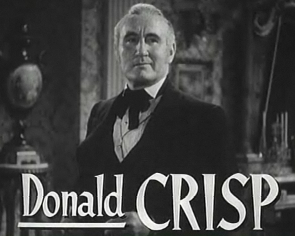
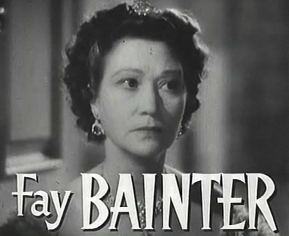
Bette Davis as Julie Marsden	Henry Fonda as Preston Dillard
George Brent as Buck Cantrell	Donald Crisp as Dr. Livingstone
Fay Bainter as Aunt Belle Massey

- Margaret Lindsay as Amy Bradford Dillard
- Richard Cromwell as Ted Dillard
- Henry O'Neill as General Theophilus Bogardus
- Spring Byington as Mrs. Kendrick
- John Litel as Jean La Cour
- Gordon Oliver as Dick Allen
- Janet Shaw as Molly Allen
- Theresa Harris as Zette
- Margaret Early as Stephanie Kendrick
- Irving Pichel as Huger
- Eddie Anderson as Gros Bat
- Stymie Beard as Ti Bat
- Lew Payton (credited as Lou Payton) as Uncle Cato
- George Renavant as De Lautruc
- Ann Codee as Mme. Poullard (uncredited)
- Stuart Holmes as doctor at duel (uncredited)

== Background ==
Turner Classic Movies states that the lead role of Julie Marsden was offered as compensation for Bette Davis after she failed to win the part of Scarlett O'Hara in Gone with the Wind (1939), but David O. Selznick never seriously considered her for it. Jezebel was her second win for the Academy Award for Best Actress after winning for Dangerous three years earlier.

Selznick reportedly hired Max Steiner to score Gone with the Wind on the strength of his work on Jezebel. Warner Bros. Pictures originally sought to cast Cary Grant for the role of Preston Dillard, but the studio balked at his salary demand of $75,000 and cast Henry Fonda.

== Reception ==
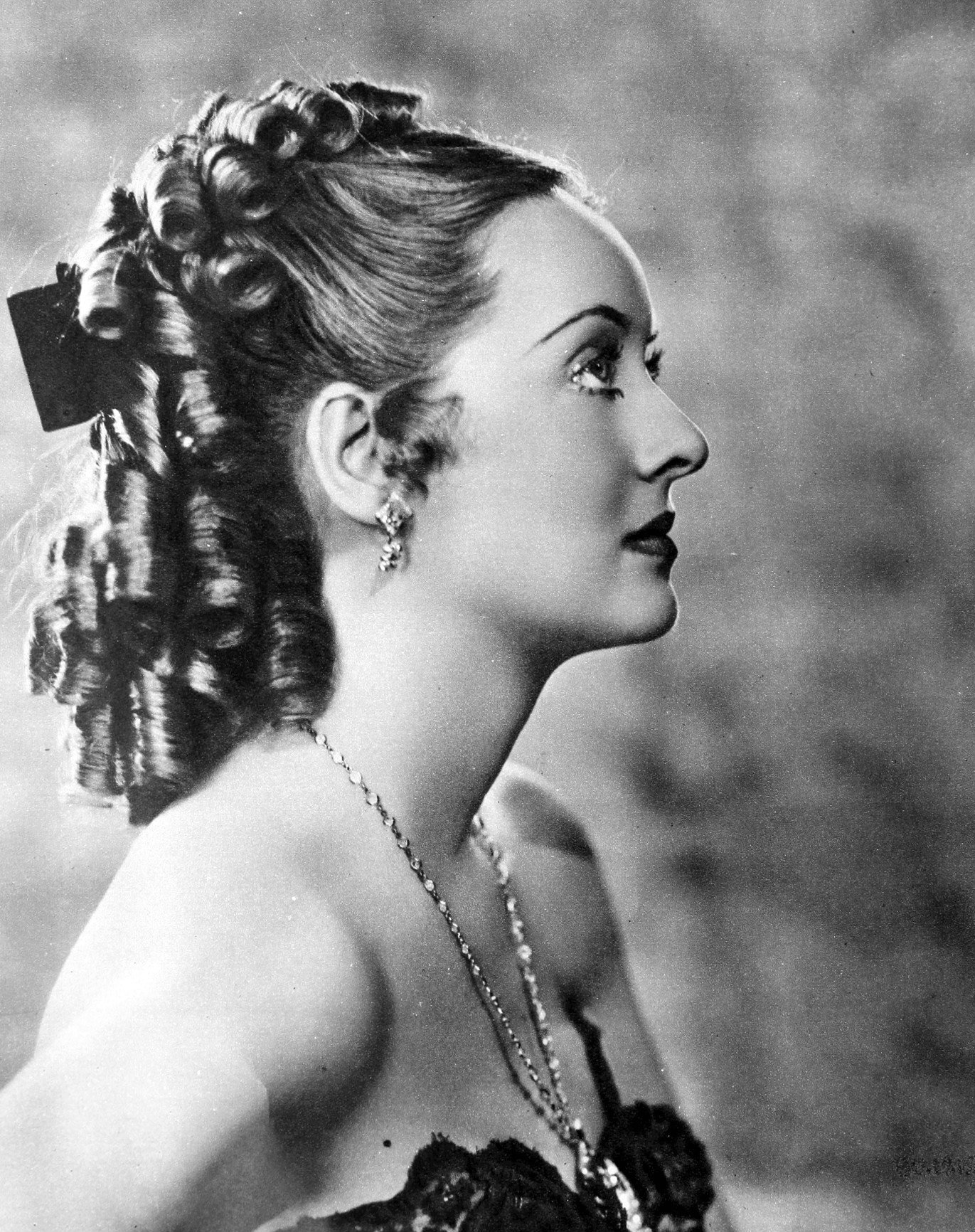
Bette Davis in the titular role

Contemporary reviews were generally positive and praised Davis' performance, but some found her character Julie's redemption at the end of the film to be unconvincing.

The movie premiered at the Radio City Music Hall, and Frank S. Nugent of The New York Times wrote that the film "would have been considerably more effective...if its heroine had remained unregenerate to the end. Miss Davis can be malignant when she chooses, and it is a shame to temper that gift for feminine spite...It is still an interesting film, though, in spite of our sniffs at its climax."

Variety reported that the film was "not without its charm" and "even completely captivating" at times, but found it detracting that the main character "suddenly metamorphoses into a figure of noble sacrifice and complete contriteness" and described the ending as "rather suspended and confusing."

The Film Daily called it "a really outstanding screen triumph for Bette Davis. She plays an emotional role that calls for running the gamut of emotions, and she handles the part with consummate artistry."

Harrison's Reports called it "Powerful dramatic entertainment...It is not what one would call cheerful entertainment, and may not appeal to the rank and file, but it should please those who like good acting."

John Mosher of The New Yorker wrote, "Something went wrong with Jezebel, possibly nothing more than the plot, and all its rich dressing-up can't make it alive...no scene quite comes off, and at the end, when the she-devil suddenly turns into a saint and a martyr, one isn't even interested. This Jezebel just seems daffy."

On the review aggregator website Rotten Tomatoes, the film holds an approval rating of 94% based on 23 reviews, with an average rating of 7.6/10.

=== Accolades ===
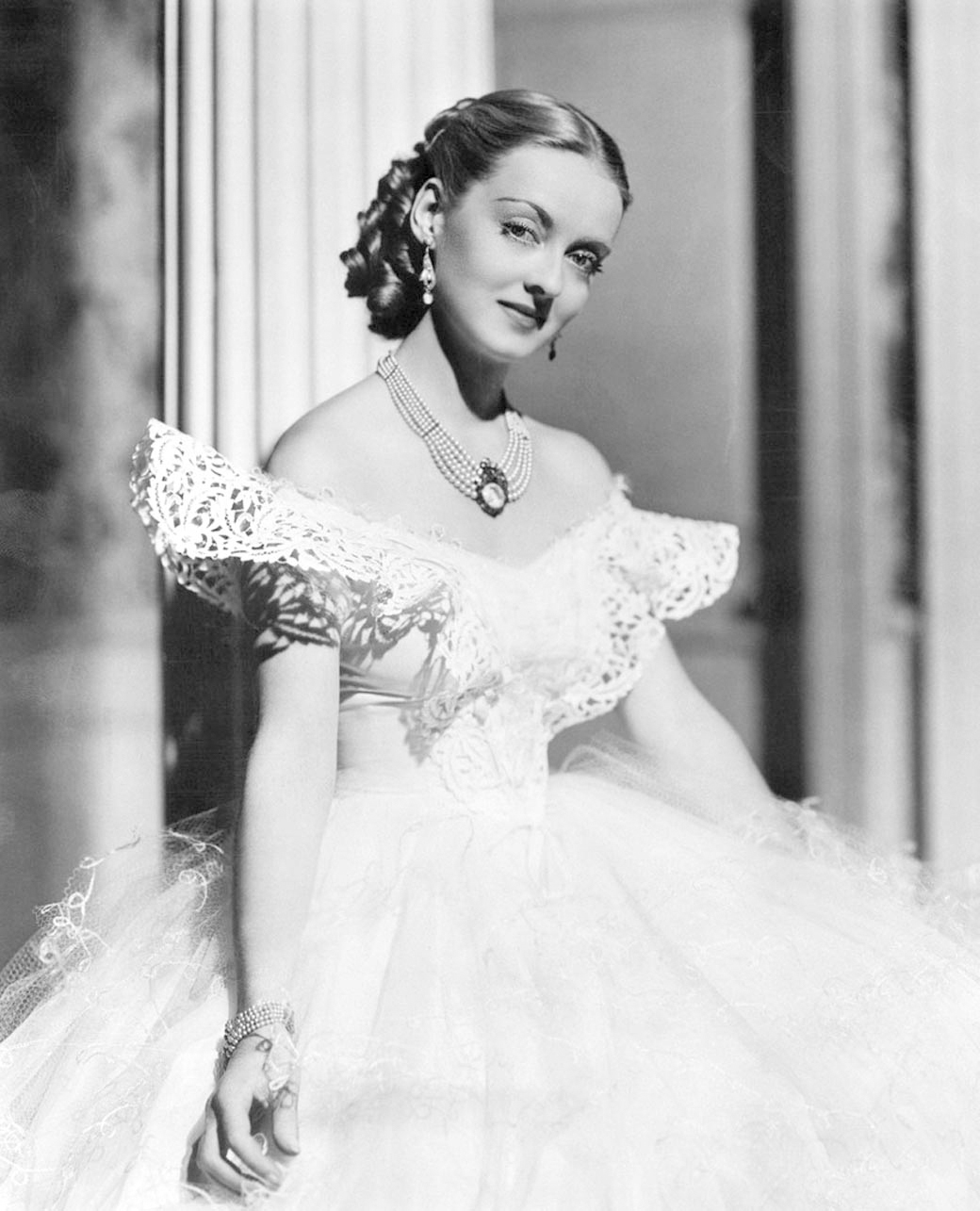
Bette Davis in Jezebel

Award	Category	Recipient	Result	Ref.
Academy Awards	Outstanding Production	Warner Bros.	Nominated	
Academy Awards	Best Actress	Bette Davis	Won	
Academy Awards	Best Supporting Actress	Fay Bainter	Won	
Academy Awards	Best Cinematography	Ernest Haller	Nominated	
Academy Awards	Best Scoring	Max Steiner	Nominated	
National Board of Review Awards	Top Ten Films	Jezebel	8th Place	
National Film Preservation Board	National Film Registry	Jezebel	Inducted	
Venice International Film Festival	Mussolini Cup (Best Foreign Film)	William Wyler	Nominated	
Venice International Film Festival	Special Recommendation	William Wyler	Won	

In 2002, the film ranked No. 79 on AFI's 100 Years... 100 Passions.

== See also ==
- List of American films of 1938
