= Florence O'Brien (actress) =

American actress, dancer and singer (1912–2006)

- Born: Florence M. Lishey; November 20, 1912; Los Angeles, California, U.S.
- Died: October 26, 2006 (aged 93); Thousand Oaks, California, U.S.
- Occupations: Dancer; actress
- Years active: 1936–1947

Florence O'Brien (born Florence M. Lishey; November 20, 1912 – October 26, 2006) was an American film and stage actress, dancer, and singer, perhaps best known for the stage performance that directly launched her screen career, her portrayal of Sulamai in the Federal Theater Project production of Hall Johnson's folk-opera, Run Little Chillun.

== Early life and career ==
Born November 20, 1912, in Los Angeles, California, O'Brien was the younger of two children of Lizzie Mae (née Jones) and Reginald Lowell Lishey. As early as August 1923, public performances by both siblings were documented by the California Eagle, when they took part in a concert staged to benefit the local YMCA, with Florence offering a vocal solo and Reginald Jr. co-starring in an original one-act play.

The neighborhood where O'Brien was raised and came of age, then known as Furlong Tract, has since become better known as South Central Los Angeles. It was there—at least one marriage, three children, and one promising but prematurely squelched theatrical debut later—that the actress first caught the eye of actor-director Clarence Muse, leading, in short order, to O'Brien landing the role of Sulamai in Muse's Federal Theater Project-sponsored 1938 revival of Hall Johnson's Run Little Chillun. (Note: As to how, exactly, the future Sulamai had come to be on Muse's radar in the first place, it was almost certainly that same squelched debut (and the attendant publicity), when visitors to the 1936 Texas Centennial Exposition had, unbeknownst to them, been denied the chance to witness that section of the vaudeville revue, Follow the Leader (i.e. the portion entitled "The Evolution of the St. Louis Blues"), wherein "the clever Florence O'Brien [was] getting over the hotcha effect". As for why and by whom this opportunity had been denied, the administrators of the exposition had evidently concluded that their upcoming booking of Orson Welles, presenting his already famous all-black version of Macbeth would be, for the festival, an absolute feather in the cap, whereas the notion of forcing audiences to witness FTL's marginally integrated cast was morally indefensible; accordingly, the inclusion of any non-white cast members in the visiting revue was banned outright. Yet despite providing what seems a textbook example of Separate but equal not quite a decade and a half prior to the Supreme Court decision deeming it unconstitutional, it did at least, on a personal level, put O'Brien in the right place, at the right time to land what would become her signature stage role.)

Aside from providing her signature role, Run Little Chillun facilitated O'Brien's transition to the screen. Arthur Dreifuss, who helmed her maiden effort, Double Deal, in 1939, spoke later that year with the Kansas City Call, acknowledging that it was the quality of acting on display in Run Little Chillun, and "especially the sensational portrayal of Zulumai by Florence O'Brien" that had inspired him to make an all Black film.

In the summer of 1939, O'Brien joined erstwhile Chillun co-stars Jess Lee Brooks, Gertrude Saunders, Eugene Henderson, and Janet Collins in a revival of Swing Mikado (based on the Gilbert & Sullivan comic opera), newly adapted by composer Elliot Carpenter, with additional music and lyrics by songwriter William Kernell, staged at Hollywood's El Capitan Theatre. Although the opera's nominal leads are Nanki-Poo and Yum-Yum, here played by James Miller and Marguerite Chapman, the Chicago Defender reminds readers that Mikado's "real stars [are] the comic characters"—including, among others, Pooh-Bah (Brooks), Pitti-Sing (O'Brien), Katisha (Saunders), and Tie-Nie (Henderson)—while California Eagle critic Almena Davis simultaneously sings O'Brien's praises while wondering out loud just how much the show's female lead performance might have benefitted had O'Brien been blessed with a somewhat upgraded set of pipes.

As pert Pitti-Sing, one of the 'Three Little Maids,' Sula Mai, (Florence O'Brien is her real name), steals many a scene, carrying over her un-combattable hip shaking to that flirtatious little part. Had she Marguerite's Chapman's lovely voice, she might have made Yum-Yum, the feminine lead, a more charming character.

In November 1940, O'Brien's performance in the musical revue, Thank You Columbus (in which O'Brien was reportedly the only prominent non-white cast member), led to her last-minute addition to the cast of Republic Pictures' Bowery Boy, as the featured dancer with pianist Phil Moore's band.

In March 1943, the actors portraying the "Spasm Band" featured in the film of Edna Ferber's novel, Saratoga Trunk, included O'Brien's son Thomas. Later that year, O'Brien had a prominent albeit uncredited role in Stormy Weather as the gold-digging date of Dooley Wilson (as homecoming WWI veteran Gabe Tucker, buddy of the somewhat autobiographical fellow vet played by Bill Robinson) during the "Welcome Home" ball scene, roughly 12½ minutes long, in which the film's other two main characters, played by Lena Horne and Emmett "Babe" Wallace, are introduced early on.

== Personal life and death ==
O'Brien was married at least twice. In 1928, she married James O'Brien, with whom she had three children, James Jr., Florence Jr., and Thomas O'Brien, As of 1940 and at least until 1950, she was married to gas station attendant Robert Hollie. As of May 1955, and at least until 1959, her husband was Quincy "Buck" Cannon.

O'Brien died October 26, 2006 in Thousand Oaks, California, at the age of 93.

== Partial filmography ==
- Double Deal (1939) – Sally
- Tell No Tales (1939) – Belle (uncredited)
- The Women (1939) – Euphie (uncredited)
- Mr Smith Goes Ghost (1940) – Mrs. Smith
- While Thousands Cheer (1940) – Daisy (uncredited)
- Bowery Boy (1940) – Dancer with Phil Moore's band (uncredited)
- Mr. Washington Goes to Town (1941) – Chambermaid
- Up Jumped the Devil (1941) (uncredited)
- Lucky Ghost (1942) – Hostess
- Professor Creeps (1942) – Daffodil Dixon
- The Panther's Claw (1942) – Petunia
- Star Spangled Rhythm (1942) – Dancer - "Sharp as a Tack" Number (uncredited)
- Happy Go Lucky (1943) – Black Native (uncredited)
- A Night for Crime (1943) – Dancer (uncredited)
- Cabin in the Sky (1943) – 2 roles: Dancer & Jim Henry's Paradise Patron (uncredited)
- Stormy Weather (1943) – Cynthanetta (Tucker's Gold-Digging Date at the Homecoming Ball) (uncredited)
- Thank Your Lucky Stars (1943) – Singer and Dancer in "Ice Cold Katy" Number (uncredited)
- Jam Session (1944) – Woman Armstrong Sings To (uncredited)
- Blonde Ransom (1945) – Maid (uncredited)
- I Wonder Who's Kissing Her Now (1947) – Marie, Fritzi's maid (uncredited)
