= Mystery in Swing =

- Directed by: Arthur Dreifuss
- Screenplay by: Arthur Hoerl
- Produced by: Rudolph Brent, Arthur Dreifuss
- Starring: Monte Hawley; Marguerite Whitten; Tommie Moore; Edward Thompson; Buck Woods; Jess Lee Brooks; Josephine Edwards (actor); Sybil Lewis (actor); Robert Webb (actor); Alfred Grant; Thomas Southern; Halley Harding
- Edited by: Robert Crandall
- Production company: Aetna Film Corp.
- Release date: 1940
- Country: United States
- Language: English

Mystery in Swing is an American murder mystery film released in 1940. It was directed by Arthur Dreifuss, based on a script by Arthur Hoerl. (The University of California at Berkeley erroneously states it was directed by Arthur Hoerl.)

Mystery in Swing features music by The Four Toppers and Cee Pee Johnson and his Orchestra and was noted as being the first time a Black orchestra recorded an entire score for a film. It is currently held in the collections of the National Museum of African American History and Culture.

== Plot ==
An unpopular band leader at a nightclub is murdered, and the list of suspects is long.

== Cast ==
- Monte Hawley as Biff Boyd
- Marguerite Whitten as Linda Carroll
- Tommie Moore as Mae Carroll
- Edward Thompson as Captain Hall
- Buck Woods as Buck Bedford
- Jess Lee Brooks as John Carroll
- Josephine Edwards as Maxine Ray
- Sybil Lewis as Cleo Ellis
- Robert Webb (actor) as Prince Ellis
- Alfred Grant as Chet Wallace
- Thomas Southern as Sgt. Phipps
- Halley Harding as Editor Bailey

== Music ==
Songs in the movie include "Jump, the water's fine", "Let's go to a party" performed by The Four Toppers, "You can't fool yourself about love", "Beat my blues away", and "Swinging sweet and lightly" performed by Cee Pee Johnson and his Orchestra.

== Reception and legacy ==
A review in Box Office noted, "The cast, largely comprising night-club entertainers, delivers competently and there are a few welcome and well-done musical interludes." Mystery in Swing has been noted for being the first time a Black orchestra recorded an entire score for a film.

The Pittsburgh Courier ran a story on the film as it was in production.
