= Music Hath Harms =

1929 film

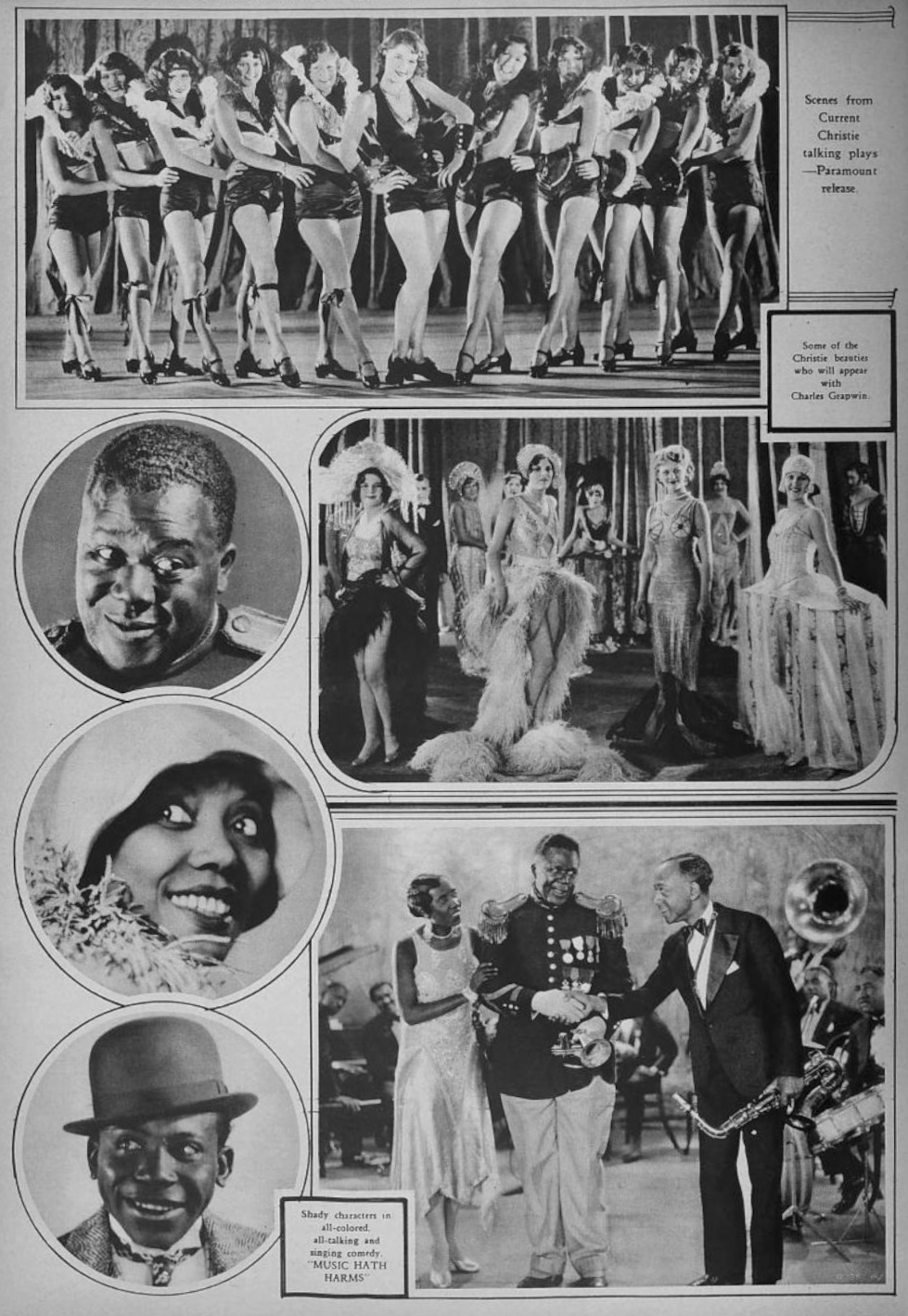
- Directed by: Walter Graham
- Screenplay by: Alfred A. Cohn
- Story by: Octavus Roy Cohen
- Produced by: Al Christie
- Starring: Spencer Williams; Roberta Hyson
- Release date: March 16, 1929 (United States)
- Country: United States
- Language: English

Music Hath Harms is an American film released in 1929. A two-reel short, it was produced by Al Christie. The film stars Spencer Williams and Roberta Hyson with musical performances by Curtis Mosby and the Blues Blowers. It was part of the Florian Slappey series. The story features a con man promising to wow an audience with a musical performance. The film remains in existence and is available online.

The film series, based on Octavus Roy Cohen's Darktown Birmingham stories published in the Saturday Evening Post include racial caricatures and exaggerated dialect. The film is one of three that survive from the series produced by Al Christie and is among the early "talkie" (with sound) films featuring African American casts. The other surviving films from the series are Framing of the Shrew and Oft in the Silly Night. Williams also served as the assistant director on the film although he received no credits.

== Cast ==
- Spencer Williams as Roscoe Griggers
- Roberta Hyson as Zenia Sprowl
- Harry Tracy as Florian Slappey
- Nathan Curry as Prof. Aleck Champagne
- Leon Hereford as Sam Ginn
- Harry Porter as Willie Trout
- Curtis Mosby as Orchestra Leader
- Mosby's Blues Blowers as the Band

== See also ==
- Music Hath Charms, a British musical comedy film released in 1935
