= Napoleon Whiting =

American character actor

Napoleon Whiting (September 21, 1910, Mississippi – October 22, 1984, Los Angeles, California), was an American character actor.

He played many bit parts, often uncredited, as a menial worker such as the African American butler, a stereotypical role. He also appeared as the butler in Giant (1956).

Whiting was best known to television audiences for his work as Silas on The Big Valley, a typecast but highly visible role.

== Filmography ==
Year	Title	Role	Notes
1942	Lucky Ghost	The Chauffeur	
1942	Professor Creeps	Taxicab Driver	
1943	Spy Train	Club Car Porter	
1943	Riding High	Red Cap	Uncredited
1945	The Falcon in San Francisco	Pullman Porter	Uncredited
1946	Centennial Summer	Red Cap	Uncredited
1947	Born to Kill	Train Porter	Uncredited
1948	The Bride Goes Wild	Porter	Uncredited
1948	The Big Clock	Bootblack	Uncredited
1950	A Woman of Distinction	Porter	Uncredited
1950	Mystery Street	Red Cap	Uncredited
1950	My Friend Irma Goes West	The Waiter	Uncredited
1951	The Tall Target	Hawker	Uncredited
1952	The Narrow Margin	Red Cap	Uncredited
1956	Alfred Hitchcock Presents	Tony	Season 1 Episode 15: "The Big Switch"
1956	Giant	Jefferson Swazey	
1957	The Tattered Dress	Willie, The Porter	Uncredited
1957	The Helen Morgan Story	Napoleon, Wade's Butler	Uncredited
1959	Imitation of Life	Kenneth, Lora's Butler	Uncredited
1959	It Happened to Jane	Eugene, The Waiter	
1959	Don't Give Up the Ship	Porter	Uncredited
1959	Career	Bellhop	Uncredited
1963	Wall of Noise	Preacher	
1963	Living Between Two Worlds	Reverend Williamson	
1963	4 for Texas	The Waiter	Uncredited
1964	Kisses for My President	The Usher	Uncredited
1965	Clarence, the Cross-Eyed Lion	Villager #2	
1966	Chamber of Horrors	Servant	Uncredited
1967	Hotel	The Waiter	Uncredited
1970	There Was a Crooked Man...	Lomax Servant	Uncredited
1971	Skin Game	Ned	
1974	Busting	Rizzo's Butler	
1974	Black Samson	Henry "Old Henry"	
1975	Farewell, My Lovely	The Hotel Clerk	
1975	Fugitive Lovers	Arthur, The Valet	
1978	Every Girl Should Have One	Napoleon	
