= Francesca Thompson =

American academic (born 1932)

Sister Francesca Thompson OSF
- Born: Edeve Thompson; 1932 (age 93–94); Los Angeles, California; United States
- Occupations: Franciscan Sister, educator and theater coach
- Years active: 1966-2005
- Parent(s): Evelyn Preer (mother), Edward Thompson (father)

Academic background
- Education: University of Michigan (1966); Xavier University (1964); Marian University (1960)

Francesca Thompson OSF (born April 29, 1932) is an American member of the Sisters of St. Francis of Oldenburg, Indiana. She was at one point a leading academic in the field of theater and African-American studies.

== Early life ==
She was born Edeve Thompson in 1932 in Los Angeles, California to Evelyn Preer and Edward Thompson, who were leading silent film actors and vaudevillians in the 1910s and 1920s. Due to the death of her mother later the same year, her father moved to Indianapolis, Indiana, where she was raised.

When it came time to attend to high school, Thompson faced the barrier of local racial segregation laws, which practically barred her from enrolling in any school in Indianapolis. Although she was from an Episcopalian family, she chose to enroll at the only private school in the region which accepted black students, Immaculate Conception (St. Mary's) Academy, in Oldenburg, Indiana, (now Oldenburg Academy) run by the Franciscan Sisters of Oldenburg. During her time as a student, Thompson chose to enter the Roman Catholic Church, overcoming the initial opposition of her father. When she graduated from the school in 1950, she made the decision to join the Franciscan sisters who had taught her, and she again faced the opposition of her father, who relented only after she agreed to join a group of students who were to travel to Europe. In the course of this trip, she met Pope Pius XII, who seemed to confirm her decision to enter the convent.

== Career ==
Thompson was received into the novitiate of the Franciscan Sisters that same year. She professed religious vows the following year, upon completing that stage of formation, at which time she received the religious habit of the congregation and the religious name by which she is known. In 1954, after professing perpetual vows as a Franciscan Sister of Oldenburg, she was sent by her superiors to teach at St. Mary's Academy while she worked on getting a bachelor's degree at Marian College (now Marian University). She obtained her degree in 1960, at which time she was assigned to teach at a school run by the congregation in the inner city of Cincinnati, Ohio.

While teaching in Cincinnati, Thompson was assigned to spend her summers working on a master's degree at Xavier University, where she earned a degree in education with a concentration in communications in 1964. She then received permission to work on a doctorate in theater at the University of Michigan, which she received in 1966. While teaching there, she trained notable actors such as Christine Lahti and Gilda Radner. She then began to teach at Marian College, where she served as chairwoman of the Department of Theater and Speech.

From 1982, Thompson was an associate professor of African American studies and assistant dean/director for multicultural programs at Fordham University, where she was honored with an honorary Doctorate in Fine Arts in 2002.

In 1987, she gave a speech at the inaugural National Black Catholic Congress, a revival of the Colored Catholic Congress spearheaded by Daniel Rudd a century before.

She retired in 2005, moving to the motherhouse of her congregation in Oldenburg.

Thompson has served as a member of the nominating committee for the Tony Awards.
