= The Lady Fare =

1929 short comedy film

The Lady Fare is a 1929 American short comedy film directed by William Watson, based on a story by Octavus Roy Cohen, with screenplay by Spencer Williams. It was produced by Al Christie and filmed by the Christie Film Company. One of the first African-American talkies, sometimes referred to as a "singie" or "dancie" due to its musical elements. it featured an all-female chorus line, possibly inspired by the Cotton Club. The 20-minute film, premiered on September 28.

== Cast ==
- Herbert V. Skinner
- Leroy Broomfield
- Claude Collins
- Vernon Elkins
- Aurora Greeley
- Leon Hereford
- Roberta Hyson
- Gus Jones
- Evelyn Preer
- Junie Rutledge
- Zack Williams
- Spencer Williams Jr.
- Edward Thompson
