= Juanita Moore =

American film, TV, and stage actress (1914–2014)

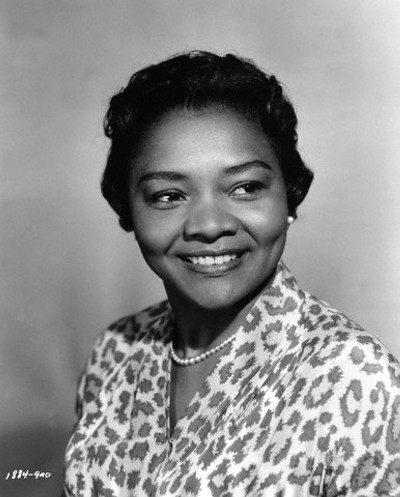
- 1950s studio publicity shot
- Born: October 19, 1914; Greenwood, Mississippi, U.S.
- Died: January 1, 2014 (aged 99); Los Angeles, California, U.S.
- Resting place: Inglewood Park Cemetery
- Occupation: Actress
- Years active: 1942–2001
- Notable work: Imitation of Life (1959)

Juanita Moore (October 19, 1914 – January 1, 2014) was an American film, television, and stage actress.

She was the fifth black actor to be nominated for an Academy Award in any category, and the third in the Supporting Actress category at a time when only one black actor, Hattie McDaniel in Gone with the Wind (1939), had won an Oscar.

Her most famous role was as Annie Johnson in the film Imitation of Life (1959).

== Early life and career ==
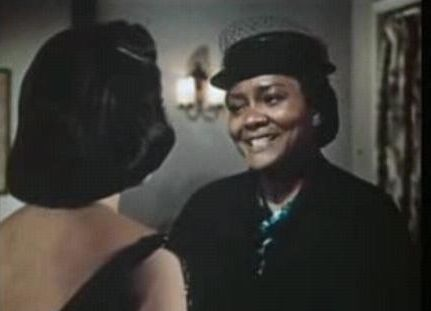
Moore as Annie Johnson in Imitation of Life (1959)

Juanita Moore was born in Greenwood, Mississippi, the daughter of Ella (née Dunn) and Harrison Moore. She had seven siblings (six sisters and one brother). Her family moved in the Great Migration to Los Angeles, where she was raised. Moore first performed as a dancer, part of a chorus line at the Cotton Club before becoming a film extra while working in theater.

Moore was the vice president of the Original Cambridge Players, who took a Los Angeles production of The Amen Corner to Broadway at the Ethel Barrymore Theater in April 1965. She was friends with Marlon Brando and James Baldwin. It was Moore who asked Brando to lend the funds ($75) to Baldwin to write the play. After making her film debut in Double Deal (1939), Moore had a number of bit parts and supporting roles in motion pictures through the late 1930s and 1950s.

Moore's performance in the remake of Imitation of Life (1959) as black housekeeper Annie Johnson, whose daughter Sarah Jane (Susan Kohner) passes for white, won her a nomination for an Academy Award for Best Supporting Actress. She was also nominated for the Golden Globe Award for Best Supporting Actress in a Motion Picture for the role. When the two versions of Imitation of Life were released together on DVD (the earlier film was released in 1934), one of the bonus features was a new interview with Moore.

She made numerous appearances on leading TV shows, notably her role as Essie on Wagon Train, and parts in three editions of The Alfred Hitchcock Hour.

On April 23, 2010, a new print of Imitation of Life (1959) was screened at the Turner Classic Movies Film Festival in Los Angeles. Both Moore and co-star Kohner attended. After the screening, the two women appeared on stage for a question-and-answer session hosted by TCM's Robert Osborne. Moore and Kohner received standing ovations.

== Personal life ==
Moore was married for 50 years to Charles Burris, who died in 2001. He was a Los Angeles bus driver and they met when she stepped out in front of his approaching bus. She and Burris married a few weeks later.

Moore died at her home in Los Angeles on December 31, 2013, at age 99 of natural causes. She is buried at Inglewood Park Cemetery.

== Hollywood Walk of Fame ==
In 2022, efforts were being made to resolve an injustice to Moore, who had been denied recognition by the Hollywood Walk of Fame. Her supporters were pleased to announce that she would finally get her own star there. This happened on October 18, 2024; Moore's star is the 2,793rd on the Walk of Fame.

== Partial filmography ==
- Double Deal (1939) as Nightclub Patron (uncredited)
- Belle Starr (1941) as Dressed Up Freed Slave (uncredited)
- Broken Strings (1942) as Nightclub Patron (uncredited)
- Star Spangled Rhythm (1942) as Dancer (uncredited)
- Cabin in the Sky (1943) as Nightclub Patron / Churchgoer (uncredited)
- Pinky (1949) as Nurse (uncredited)
- Tarzan's Peril (1951) as Native Woman (uncredited)
- No Questions Asked (1951) as Maid in Lounge (uncredited)
- Skirts Ahoy! (1952) as Black Drill Team Member (uncredited)
- Lydia Bailey (1952) as Marie (uncredited)
- Affair in Trinidad (1952) as Dominique
- The Iron Mistress (1952) as Juanita, Judalon's Maid (uncredited)
- The Royal African Rifles (1953) as Elderly Woman
- Witness to Murder (1954) as Mental Patient
- The Gambler from Natchez (1954) as Yvette's Maid (uncredited)
- Women's Prison (1955) as Polyclinic 'Polly' Jones
- Lord of the Jungle (1955) as Molu's Wife (uncredited)
- Not as a Stranger (1955) as Mrs. Clara Bassett (uncredited)
- Ransom! (1956) as Shirley Lorraine
- The Opposite Sex (1956) as Powder Room Attendant (uncredited)
- The Girl Can't Help It (1956) as Hilda
- Something of Value (1957) as Tribal Woman (uncredited)
- Band of Angels (1957) as Budge (uncredited)
- The Helen Morgan Story (1957) as Lucey, Backstage Maid (uncredited)
- Bombers B-52 (1957) as Clarissa (uncredited)
- The Green-Eyed Blonde (1957) as Miss Randall (uncredited)
- Imitation of Life (1959) as Annie Johnson
- Alfred Hitchcock Presents (1961) (Season 7 Episode 2: "Bang! You're Dead") as Cleo
- Tammy Tell Me True (1961) as Della
- Walk on the Wild Side (1962) as Mama
- A Child Is Waiting (1963) as Julius' Mother (uncredited)
- Papa's Delicate Condition (1963) as Ellie
- "Wagon Train (1963) as Essie (Season 3 Episode 30: "The Blane Wessels Story"
- The Alfred Hitchcock Hour (1963) (Season 1 Episode 23: "The Lonely Hours") as Mrs. MacFarland
- The Alfred Hitchcock Hour (1964) (Season 2 Episode 24: "The Gentleman Caller") as Mrs. Jones
- The Alfred Hitchcock Hour (1965) (Season 3 Episode 13: "Where the Woodbine Twineth") as Suse
- The Singing Nun (1966) as Sister Mary
- Rosie! (1967) as Nurse
- Gentle Ben (1967) as Mama Jolie
- Dragnet (1967) "The Missing Realtor" as Mrs. Edna Jenkins
- Uptight (1968) as Mama Wells
- Angelitos negros (1970) as Nana Mercé
- ‘’Mannix‘’ (1970) as Mrs. Davis (Season 4 Episode 3: "Time Out of Mind")
- Skin Game (1971) as Viney (Calloway slave)
- The Mack (1973) as Mrs. Mickens, Mother
- Adam-12 (1973) (Season 5, Episodes 14 and 15: “Clear with a Civilian” Parts I and II) as Edna Dickson
- Fox Style (1973) as Hattie Fox
- Thomasine & Bushrod (1974) as Pecolia
- The Get-Man (1974)
- Abby (1974) as Miranda 'Momma' Potter
- Fugitive Lovers (1975) as Assemblywoman Griffith
- Everybody Rides the Carousel (1975) as Stage 8 (voice)
- Paternity (1981) as Celia
- O'Hara's Wife (1982) as Ethel
- And They're Off (1982) as Sadie Johnson
- Two Moon Junction (1988) as Delilah
- The Sterling Chase (1999) as Grandma Jones (voice)
- Disney's The Kid (2000) as Kenny's Grandmother (voice)
