= Charles Olden =

Charles Olden may refer to:

- Charles Smith Olden, American merchant, banker, and politician
- Charles Olden (actor), African-American actor
- Ted Ray (comedian), born Charles Olden, English comedian
