= Broken Strings =

Broken Strings may mean:

- "Broken Strings" (song) by James Morrison featuring Nelly Furtado
- Broken Strings (film), a 1940 film
- strings (music), strings used in musical instruments
