= Tommie Moore =

American actress (1917–2004)

Tommie Moore (December 2, 1917 – August 17, 2004) was an actress in theater, film, and television. She was born Pretty Tomiwitta Moore and shortened her name, though she was sometimes credited as Tomiwitta Moore.

== Early life ==
Moore was a native of Pasadena, California, where she performed on the stage as a child. She was given the name "Tomiwitta" because her father had wanted a boy to name "Thomas".

== Career ==
She traveled to New York to go to dramatic school, but instead became a page girl at the Cotton Club. One of her job duties was to escort W.C. Handy on and off the stage.

Moore toured in the starring role in a touring production of Claudia in 1946. She left Claudia for the original theatrical production of Beggar's Holiday the same year playing Tawdry Audrey. In the production, she had to run across the stage in a two-handkerchief bathing suit.

She performed as part of the chorus of three (with Eartha Kitt and Helena Hughes) in Orson Welles' production of The Blessed and the Damned in Paris in 1950. Both Beggar's Holiday and The Blessed and the Damned in Paris had music by Duke Ellington.

In her film career, she received positive notice for her role in The Green-Eyed Blonde (1957); a Variety review called her a "standout" and Ebony magazine profiled her around the time of the film's release.

She appeared on television shows The Amos 'n Andy Show and Bourbon Street Beat.

== Personal life ==
She was engaged to postal worker George Gray and was involved with the Red Cross.

== Filmography ==
- Mystery in Swing (1940) as Mae Carroll
- Broken Strings (1940) as Mary
- That Man of Mine (1946) as Honey Diamond
- The Green-Eyed Blonde (1957) as Trixie Budlong
- Band of Angels (1957) as Dollie

=== Smaller roles ===
- Gangsters on the Loose (1937)
- Spirit of Youth (1938) (uncredited)
- Stormy Weather (1943) (uncredited)
- Cabin in the Sky (1943) (uncredited)
