= Brown Gravy =

1929 film by William Watson

Brown Gravy is a 1929 American comedy film with an African American cast. William Watson directed the Al Christie production. It was among the early "talkie" films released with African American casts. Octavus Roy Cohen wrote the story, part of a series he wrote for the Saturday Evening Post adapted to film in collaboration with Christie. The film's thin plot includes themes addressing religion, fraternal organizations, con men, and family life.

The New York Public Library has photos used in promoting the film including caricatures of the leads. The film features a singing contest between choral groups in Memphis.

== Cast ==
- Spencer Williams
- Roberta Hyson
- Sam McDaniel
- Edward Thompson
- Evelyn Preer
- The Georgia Jubilee Singers
