= Roberta Hyson =

American actress (1905–1989)

Roberta Hyson (née Roberta Mae Dudley; 1905 in Dallas–1989 in Los Angeles) was an American actress, dancer and singer who appeared in several African-American talkies by the Christie Film Company and played a main role in The Melancholy Dame (1929).

== Filmography ==
- Brown Gravy (1929)
- Oft in the Silly Night (1929) as Mezanine Conner
- The Melancholy Dame (1929) as Sappho Dill
- Music Hath Harms (1929) as Zenia Sprowl
- The Framing of the Shrew (1929) as Mallissie Cheese
- The Lady Fare (1929) as Miss Eva Mapes
- Georgia Rose (1930) as Helen
