= The Widow's Bite =

- Starring: Spencer Williams; Evelyn Preer; Edward Thompson
- Production company: Al Christie Production
- Release date: 1929
- Country: USA
- Language: English

The Widow's Bite is a 1929 American comedy short film starring Spencer Williams, Evelyn Preer, and Edward Thompson. An Al Christie production, it was part of the film series adapted from the work of Octavus Roy Cohen. The film includes "negro dialect".
