= Marguerite Whitten =

American actress (1913–1990)

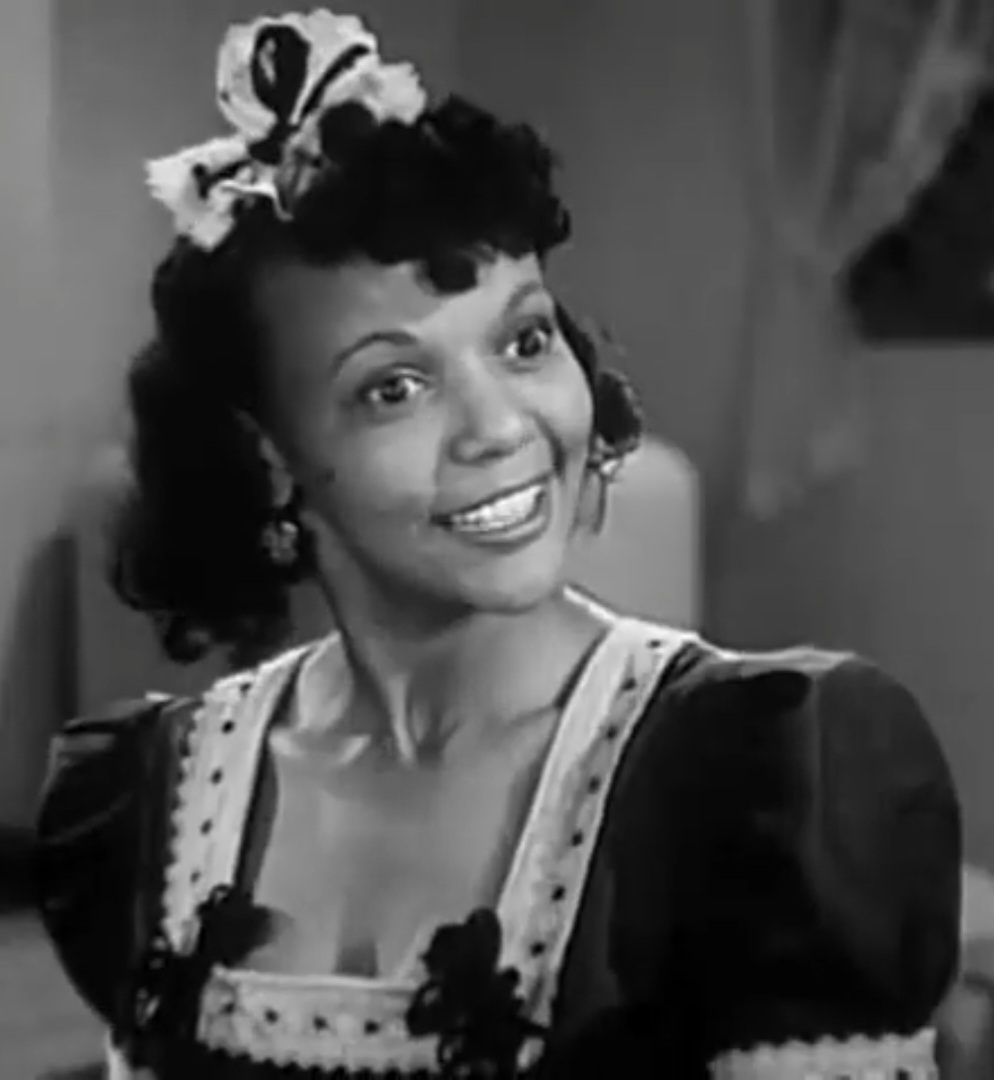
- Whitten in Let's Go Collegiate (1941)
- Born: February 23, 1913; Greenville, Mississippi, U.S.
- Died: December 25, 1990 (aged 77); Los Angeles County, California, U.S.
- Other names: Margaret Whitten
- Occupation: Actress
- Years active: 1938–1943

Marguerite Whitten (February 23, 1913 – December 25, 1990) was an American film actress appearing in 14 films between 1938 and 1943, often with actor Mantan Moreland. She was also billed as Margaret Whitten.

Whitten was born on February 23, 1913, in Mississippi. She died on December 25, 1990, in Los Angeles County.

== Filmography ==
- Spirit of Youth (1938) as Eleanor Thomas
- Two-Gun Man from Harlem (1938) as Sally Thompson
- The Toy Wife (1938) (uncredited)
- Way Down South (1939) (uncredited)
- Bad Boy (1939) (uncredited)
- Mystery in Swing (1940)
- Cadet Girl (1941)
- Let's Go Collegiate (1941)
- Mr. Washington Goes to Town (1941)
- King of the Zombies (1941)
- Lady Luck (1942) (uncredited)
- Professor Creeps (1942) as Mrs. Green
- Sleepytime Gal (1942) (uncredited)
- After Midnight with Boston Blackie (1943) (uncredited)
