= Nathan Curry =

American actor

Nathan Curry (January 2, 1897 – December 14, 1964) was an American actor. He was a supporting actor in several films featuring African American casts. Curry had prominent parts in silent films but was not given screen credit. He was one of the featured players of Black Hollywood.

Before Los Angeles, he lived in Houston, Texas. He began acting in movies in 1919 with a small part in The Leopard Woman. He was cast in the film South Sea Love in 1927. Curry was in charge of 27 actors during the filming of The Notorious Lady (1927) at the First National Productions' studio. For the 1929 film, Four Feathers, Curry helped cast and was in charge of the 600 Black actors that took part in the film's battle scenes. In Al Christie's talkie, Music Hath Harms, Curry had a prominent role as Champagne, the bandmaster. In Ernest B. Shoedsack's film, King Kong, Curry managed 150 actors, including adults and children.

In 1948, he was an employee of the Los Angeles Housing Authority.

He was part of the African American community of actors in Hollywood along with Maceo Bruce Sheffield and others.

== Filmography ==
- The Leopard Woman (1920)
- Tarzan and the Golden Lion (1927)
- Topsy and Eva (1927)
- West of Zanzibar (1928)
- Thunderbolt (1929)
- Music Hath Harms (1929) as Prof. Aleck Champagne
- Four Feathers (1929)
- Tarzan and His Mate (1934) as Saidi
- Harlem on the Prairie (1937) as Bart
- Congo Maisie (1940) as Laemba
- Lucky Ghost (1942) as Farmer
- Mr. Washington Goes to Town (1942) as Policeman
- Uncle Tom's Cabin
- The Missing Link
- One in the Air
- Diamond Handcuff
- Hallelujah
- Hearts in Dixie (1929)
- Golden Dawn
- Isles of Escape
