= Devil's Disciple =

Devil's Disciple may refer to:

- The Devil's Disciple (play), an 1897 play by George Bernard Shaw
  - The Devil's Disciple (1959 film), adaptation directed by Guy Hamilton
  - The Devil's Disciple (1987 film), adaptation directed by David Jones
- The Devil's Disciple (1926 film), a silent film on white slavery, written and directed by Oscar Micheaux
- Devil's Disciples, a 2007 television series from Hong Kong
- Devils Diciples (sic), an American outlaw motorcycle club
- Devil's Disciples Motorcycle Club (Canada), a now-defunct French-Canadian outlaw motorcycle club
