= Jungle Siren =

1942 film by Sam Newfield

- Original film poster
- Directed by: Sam Newfield
- Written by: George Wallace Sayre (story) and Milton Raison (story); George Wallace Sayre (screenplay) and Sam Robins (screenplay)
- Produced by: Sigmund Neufeld (producer)
- Starring: Ann Corio; Buster Crabbe
- Cinematography: Jack Greenhalgh
- Edited by: Holbrook N. Todd
- Distributed by: Producers Releasing Corporation
- Release date: 14 August 1942
- Running time: 68 minutes
- Country: United States
- Language: English

Jungle Siren is a 1942 American film directed by Sam Newfield.

== Plot ==
Captain Hart and Sergeant Jenkins, two Americans in the Free French Engineering Corps in Africa are sent to the jungle city of Carraby to do surveying for an airfield. They run across a pair on Germans acting as a Fifth Column using Chief Selangi to bring in a German invasion force.

Hart and Jenkins are helped by a fearless jungle girl named Kuhlaya.

== Cast ==
- Ann Corio as Kuhlaya
- Buster Crabbe as Captain Gary Hart
- Evelyn Wahl as Frau Anna Lukas
- Paul Bryar as Sergeant Mike Jenkins
- Milton Kibbee as Dr. Thomas Harrigan
- Arno Frey as Herr George Lukas
- Jess Lee Brooks as Chief Selangi
- Manart Kippen as Major Renault - Commandant
- James Adamson as Johnny - a Native
- Greco as himself, a chimpanzee

== Soundtrack ==
- Ann Corio - "Song of the Jungle" (Written by Johnny Lange and Lew Porter)
