= Vernon McCalla =

- Born: 1905; Kingston, Jamaica
- Died: 1968 (aged 63)
- Occupation: Actor

Vernon McCalla (1905-1968) was a Jamaican American actor and activist who worked in Hollywood in the 1930s and 1940s. He appeared in many of the films made by Million Dollar Productions.

== Biography ==
Vernon was born in Kingston, Jamaica, to James McCalla and Florence Mossman. The family relocated to Oakland, California, when Vernon was young, and eventually he made his way to Hollywood where he began appearing on-screen. McCalla served as a representative for Black Hollywood professionals looking for more opportunities in filmmaking in the late 1930s and headed up the city's Young Voters' Club. Around that time, be began acting in a number of films made by Million Dollar Productions, a Los Angeles–based company owned and operated by Black filmmakers. He later returned to Oakland, where he became a businessman and was active in local politics.

== Selected filmography ==
- Lady Luck (1942)
- Mr. Washington Goes to Town (1941)
- Four Shall Die (1940)
- Am I Guilty? (1940)
- One Dark Night (1939)
- Reform School (1939)
- Double Deal (1939)
- Gang Smashers (1938)
- The Duke Is Tops (1938)
