= Charles Olden (actor) =

American actor (1892–1943)

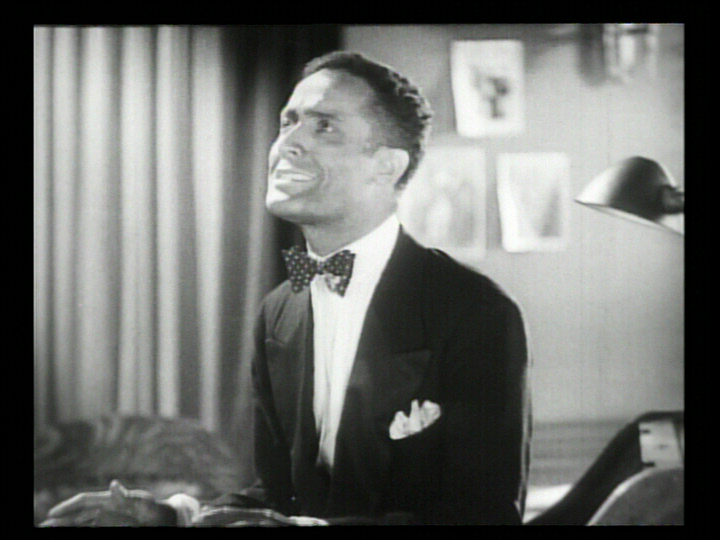
- Charles Olden as Florian Slappey in The Melancholy Dame (1929)
- Born: May 5, 1892
- Died: September 29, 1943 (aged 51)
- Occupation: Actor

Charles Olden (May 5, 1892 – September 29, 1943) was an actor on stage and screen in the United States. He had a leading role in a pair of films made with African American casts. He was also in theatrical performances with other prominent African American actors of stage and screen including Evelyn Preer.

Olden portrayed Florian Slappey in two films. The films and character were adapted in Al Christie productions of Octavus Roy Cohen's "Darktown Birmingham" comedy series published in the Saturday Evening Post.

He was part of the Ethiopian Art Theatre group in New York City. Olden won plaudits for his role in an adaptation of William Shakespeare's Comedy of Errors and as George in an adaptation of Oscar Wilde's Salome.

== Theater ==
- Comedy of Errors (1923), an adaptation of William Shakespeare's play
- Salome (1923), by Oscar Wilde, as "A Cappadocian/First Jew". Performed at the Frazee Theatre. Lionel Monagas and Evelyn Preer were also in the show. It was his Broadway debut.
- Runnin' Wild (1923), a musical comedy with music by James Johnson, lyrics by Cecil Mack, choreographed by Lyda Webb, and book by F. E. Miller and Aubrey L. Lyles. Performed at the New Colonial Theatre. As head waiter. Cast also included Ralph Cooper and Monte Hawley.

== Filmography ==
- The Framing of the Shrew (1929) as Florian Slappey
- The Melancholy Dame (1929) as Florian Slappey
