= Georgia Rose =

1930 film

Georgia Rose was a 1930 film. It was directed by Harry Gant and stars Clarence Brooks. It followed the 1928 film Absent with Brooks as its star.

The film was produced by Aristo Film Corporation and the songwriter was Fred C. Washington. The film was the first film talkie actress and singer Evelyn Preer appeared in.

== Plot ==
The film is about an African American family migrating north. This picture was filmed by Harry Gant, former cameraman with the Lincoln Motion Picture Company. This story is about a minister's attempt to move his flock and daughter from Georgia to better farming land in the Midwest. While boarding up with a family, the minister's daughter is smitten by the love bug and led to corruption by her new lover's brother. Of course, she is saved in the nick of time by her new lover and forgiven by her father.

== Cast ==
- Clarence Brooks as Ralph
- Irene Wilson as Rose
- Evelyn Preer as Grace
- Roberta Hyson as Helen
- Allegretti Anderson (née Alegretta Summers; 1898–1944) as Ethel
- Edward Thompson as Bob
- Webb King as Joe
- Spencer Williams as Ezra
- Dora Dean Johnson as Mary Barnett
- E. C. Dyer as Reverend Hoskins

== Reception ==
The film received coverage from the Baltimore Afro-American, California Eagle, Chicago Whip, New York Age, and Pittsburgh Courier. Henry Louis Gates described the film as a race musical.
