= Double Deal (1939 film) =

- Directed by: Arthur Dreifuss
- Written by: Arthur Hoerl (story); Arthur Hoerl (screenplay); F.E. Miller (additional dialogue)
- Produced by: Dixon R. Harwin (producer); George Randol (executive producer)
- Starring: See below
- Cinematography: Mack Stengler
- Edited by: Carl Pierson
- Music by: Ross DiMaggio
- Production company: George Randol Productions
- Distributed by: Sack Amusement Enterprises; Astor Pictures Corporation (US; states rights)
- Release date: 1939
- Running time: 60 minutes
- Country: United States
- Language: English

Double Deal is a 1939 American drama with an all-black cast (a genre at the time called "race films"), written by Arthur Hoerl, produced by George Randol, directed by Arthur Dreifuss and released on the independent states-rights market by Sack Amusement Enterprises and Astor Pictures Corp.

== Plot summary ==
Two men, Tommy McCoy and Dude Markey, are in love with Nita, a beautiful nightclub singer/dancer. Markey robs a jewelry store and gives the haul to a local gangster. Later, he steals the jewelry from the gangster's safe and frames McCoy for the robbery in the hope that the gangster will kill him, thereby getting rid of his rival for the lovely Nita.

== Cast ==
- Monte Hawley as Jim McCoy
- Jeni Le Gon as Nita
- Edward Thompson as Dude Markey
- Florence O'Brien as Sally
- Freddie Jackson as Tommy McCoy
- Buck Woods
- Maceo Bruce Sheffield as Murray Howard
- Charles Hawkins
- Jack Clisby
- Tom Southern
- Vernon McCalla
- Charles Gordon as Lanny
- Arthur Ray
- F.E. Miller as Nightclub Comedian
- Shelton Brooks as Singer in Nightclub Floorshow
- Juanita Moore as Nightclub Patron

== Soundtrack ==
- Shelton Brooks - "Hole in the Wall" (Written by Shelton Brooks)
- "Jitterbugs Cuttin' Rugs" (Written by Shelton Brooks)
- "Gettin' in Right with You" (Written by Peter Tinturin and Harry Tobias)
