= Tom Southern =

American actor

Tom Southern, also known as Tommy or Thomas Southern, was an actor in American film and stage productions as well as a songwriter. He was a theater actor with the Lafayette Players.

In 1933, he wrote several songs together with Lionel Hampton. For a few years before 1937, Southern was absent from acting in films and theater; the Pittsburgh Courier stated he "gave up acting as a career" around 1936 and became a journalist. In 1938, he was the managing editor for the launch of the magazine Silhouette Pictorial.

Southern acted in a supporting role in the Western film, Two-Gun Man from Harlem. He acted in the "all-colored cast" film Mystery in Swing. In a review, the Pittsburgh Courier said he gave the best individual performance by a male. War Perkins of the Chicago Defender newspaper listed Southern and three others as giving the best performances in the film.

Around 1940, Southern partnered with drummer Lionel Hampton on a musical film project, titled From Spirituals to Swing, which was "accepted by the Paramount production department". The film featured Black spirituals and swing music. It was said to have an "all-colored cast". In 1940, Hampton announced that the film would release soon. The movie then "fell through" that year.

According to a copyright, Southern, Hampton, and Otis René wrote a song together for the feature, titled "I'd Be Lost Without You". A record of the song was made at Victor Records in 1940, with Hampton credited for the music and Southern for the lyrics. Lionel Hampton and the King Cole Trio played on the record, with Helen Forrest singing. After the recording, Otis René claimed he was not given a contract for the record and was left uncredited. He stated he intended to sue.

Tom was married to Viola Southern.

== Filmography ==
- Bargain with Bullets (1937)
- Spirit of Youth (1938) as Dr. Bowdin
- Two-Gun Man from Harlem (1938) as John Steel
- Double Deal (1939)
- Harlem Rides the Range (1939) as Jim Connors
- Mystery in Swing (1940) as Sgt. Phipps
- Look-Out Sister (1947)
