= Cee Pee Johnson =

American jazz composer, bandleader and musician (1910–1954)

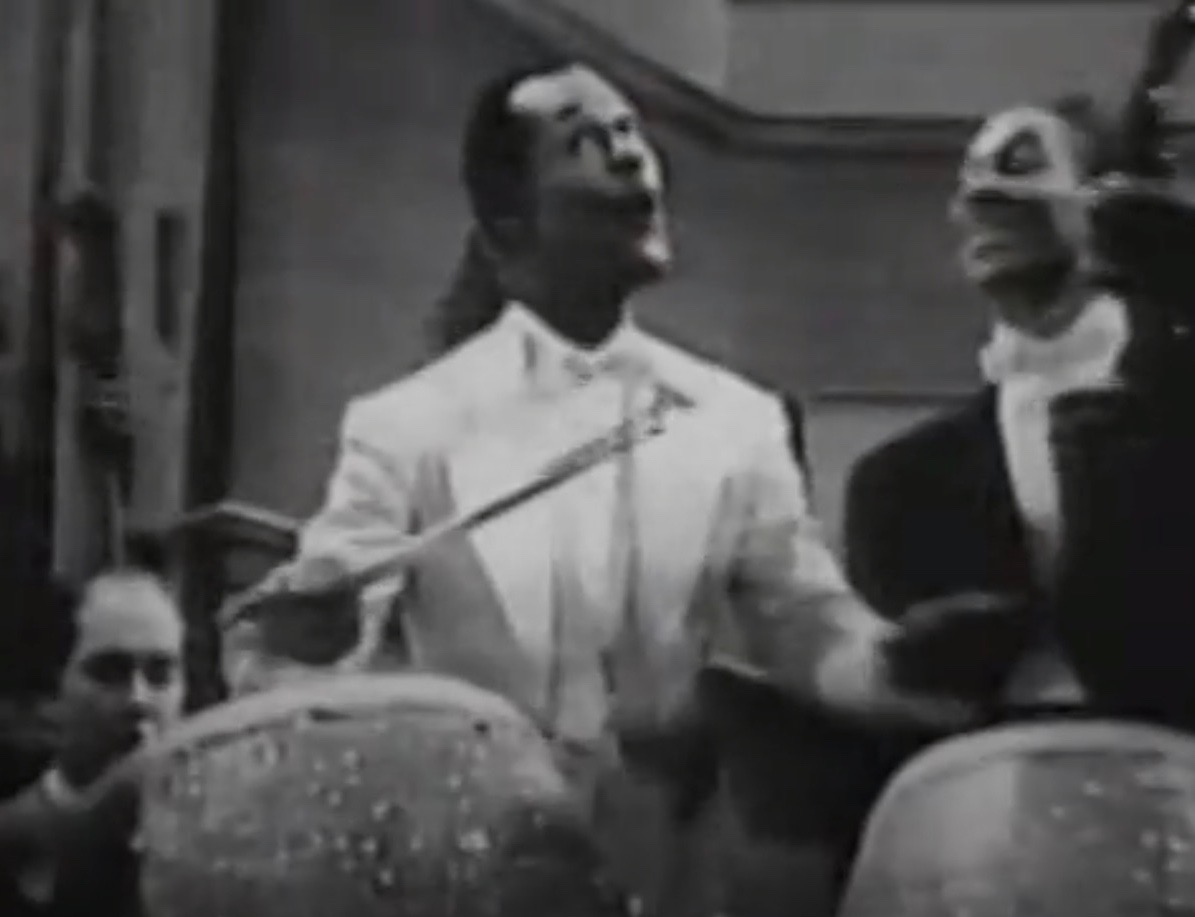
- Making his regrettably belated but highly impactful first credited screen appearance in Mystery in Swing (1940).

Background information
- Also known as: C. B. Johnson, prior to Mystery in Swing (1940); Byron Johnson, on 1946 Gladys Bentley session
- Born: Clifton Byron Johnson; February 21, 1910; Marshall, Texas, U.S.
- Died: After October 1954 Los Angeles, California, U.S.
- Genres: Jazz, Afro-Cuban jazz, Blues
- Occupations: Composer, arranger, bandleader, singer
- Instruments: Drums, piano, guitar, banjo
- Years active: 1929–1954
- Labels: Apollo Records, Atomic Records, Black & White Records

Cee Pee Johnson (born Clifton Byron Johnson, February 21, 1910 – after October 1954) was an American jazz composer, bandleader, singer and multi-instrumentalist.

== Early life and career ==
Johnson was born in Marshall, Texas in February 1910 and raised in Algiers, New Orleans. (Note: Although at least three retrospective sources give his birthplace as Algiers and/or New Orleans, the birth certificate dated February 21, 1910 indicates that, at the time of his birth, Johnson's parents had temporarily migrated to Marshall in search of cotton-related seasonal employment.) He first appeared in published sources in Dallas early in the 1930s, billed as C. B. Johnson, playing in his brother Bert Johnson's band The Sharps and Flats. Johnson danced and sang with this ensemble, and also played banjo and tom-toms.

He moved to Los Angeles in the middle of the decade, and played with Emerson Scott's band at the Onyx Club in Hollywood. He eventually became the group's bandleader, and played at several high-profile West Coast clubs, including the Paradise Club, the Del Mar Club (1940), the Rhumboogie, and Billy Berg's Swing Club. His sidemen included Teddy Buckner, Karl George, Buddy Banks, Marshal Royal, Jack McVea, Johnny Miller, and Buddy Collette. His backup drummer was Alton Redd. The ensemble appeared in many films, and was active until at least 1954; he toured South America in 1953.

Johnson worked as a sideman with Slam Stewart and Slim Gaillard on their Slim and Slam sessions.

== Filmography ==
All entries drawn from Library of Congress except where otherwise noted.

- Fox Movietone Follies of 1929 (1929) – N/A (uncredited)
- The Music Goes 'Round (1936) – N/A (uncredited)
- Woodland Café (1937) – Chorus voice (uncredited)
- Mystery in Swing (1940) – With his orchestra
- Citizen Kane (1941) – Drummer in beach party sequence (uncredited)
- Tom, Dick and Harry (1941) – N/A (uncredited)
- Birth of the Blues (1941) – N/A (uncredited)
- Hellzapoppin' (1941) – With his orchestra (uncredited)
- Swing for Your Supper (soundie; 1941) – Leading his orchestra, with Dorothy Dandridge dancing
- Jump In (soundie; 1942) – With his orchestra
- The Desert Song (1943) – Percussionist in Moroccan cafe sequences
- Jungle Jig (soundie; 1944) – With his orchestra, accompanying Dorothy Dandridge
- To Have and Have Not (1944) – Drummer in club group (uncredited)
- The Jolson Story (1946) – Unseen drum soloist in final night club scene (uncredited)
- The Razor's Edge (1946) – Bandleader / Drum soloist in nightclub (uncredited)
- The Foxes of Harrow (1947) – Drummer in voodoo sequence (uncredited)
