= The Melancholy Dame =

1929 film

The film

The Melancholy Dame is a 1929 American comedy short film with an African-American cast. Al Christie based it on the Octavus Roy Cohen comedy series called "Darktown Birmingham", published in the Saturday Evening Post. Arvid Gillstrom directed it and Evelyn Preer played the title role.

The Melacholy Dame was produced and released by Paramount Pictures and includes racial caricatures. It has been described as the first African-American talkie and features a vision of high society and comic dialogue in a Birmingham restaurant with a piano and dance show. The Los Angeles Times summarized the plot: "A cabaret owner's wife demands that her husband fire the sexy star attraction (if he doesn't, she warns, 'there's going to be a quick call for an undertaker'). Little does she (or the singer's husband) know that the singer and the club owner were once married."

Once a two-reel film, the video is now digitized for YouTube along with others from the series.

== Cast ==
- Edward Thompson as Permanent Williams
- Evelyn Preer as Jonquil Williams
- Roberta Hyson as Sappho Dill
- Spencer Williams as Webster Dill
- Charles Olden as Florian Slappey
