= The Spider's Web (1926 film) =

1926 film

- Directed by: Oscar Micheaux
- Based on: "The Policy Players" by Oscar Micheaux
- Produced by: Oscar Micheaux
- Starring: Evelyn Preer
- Production company: Micheaux Film Corp.
- Distributed by: States Rights
- Release date: December 27, 1926
- Country: United States
- Language: English

The Spider's Web is a 1926 American film directed by Oscar Micheaux which stars Evelyn Preer. It was remade in 1932 as The Girl from Chicago.

The film is about a beautiful young woman from Harlem in New York City who travels to a small town in Mississippi where she receives unwelcome courting. She returns to Harlem.

== Plot ==
Norma Shepard is a teenage Black girl from Harlem in New York City. While visiting her aunt in Mississippi, she is crudely and sexually propositioned by Ballinger, the son of a local white plantation owner. Ballinger later attempts to rape Norma at the aunt's home. Elmer Harris, a Black employee of the U.S. Department of Justice, is investigating illegal slavery in the area. Norma tells him about the attack, and he arrests Ballinger.

Norma convinces her aunt to move to Harlem. The aunt loses her life savings playing the numbers racket. With her last dollar, the aunt manages to pick a winning number. When she tries to collect her winnings from Martinez, the racketeer, she finds him dead. She takes her winnings from his safe.

The aunt is arrested for Martinez's murder. Elmer Harris, now working undercover in Harlem investigating the rackets, proves the aunt's innocence by discovering that wealthy Madame Boley killed her lover Martinez. Elmer and Norma wed.

== Cast ==
- Evelyn Preer as Norma Shepard
- Lorenzo McLane as Elmer Harris
- Edward Thompson
- Grace Smyth as Madame Boley
- Marshall Rodgers
- Henrietta Loveless
- Billy Gulfport
- Dorothy Treadwell
- Zaidee Jackson

== Preservation ==
The Spider's Web is currently presumed lost. In February of 2021, the film was cited by the National Film Preservation Board on their Lost U.S. Silent Feature Films list.
