= Two Gun Man from Harlem =

1938 film

- Theatrical release poster
- Directed by: Richard C. Kahn
- Written by: Richard C. Kahn
- Starring: Herbert Jeffrey; Clarence Brooks; Margaret Whitten; Mantan Moreland; Stymie; Spencer Williams; Tom Southern; Mae Turner; Jesse Brooks; The Four Tones; The Cats and the Fiddle
- Cinematography: Marcel Le Picard and Harvey Gould
- Edited by: Wm. Faris
- Music by: Herbert Jeffrey and The Four Tones
- Production companies: Merit Pictures, Inc.
- Distributed by: Sack Amusement Enterprises, Inc. (uncredited)
- Release date: May 1, 1938
- Running time: 65 minutes 60 minutes (UAA Timeless video print)
- Country: United States
- Language: English

Two Gun Man from Harlem is a 1938 American contemporary Western film directed by Richard C. Kahn. It was produced by Merit Pictures, distributed by Sack Amusement Enterprises and featured an all-African-American cast.

== Plot summary ==
A man wrongly accused of murder disguises himself as a Harlem gangster known as "the Deacon", in order to bring to justice the men who framed him. He succeeds and reveals himself to the girl who loves him, and they go off to live happily ever after. There are many cleverly comic interludes in the story.

== Cast ==
- Herb Jeffries as Bob Blake/The Deacon (as Herbert Jeffrey)
- Margaret Whitten as Sally Thompson
- Clarence Brooks as John Barker
- Mantan Moreland as Bill Blake
- Stymie Beard as Jimmy Thompson
- Spencer Williams, Jr. as Butch Carter
- Mae Turner as Mrs. Ruth Steel
- Jesse Lee Brooks as Sheriff
- Rose Lee Lincoln as Dolores
- Tom Southern as John Steel
- The Cats and the Fiddle as Specialty Act
- The Four Tones as Singing Group
- Paul Blackman as Paul Blackman

== Soundtrack ==
- "I'm a Happy Cowboy" by Herb Jeffries and The Four Tones
- Die Walküre written by Richard Wagner

== Home video ==
The film is in the public domain and has been released on a US DVD-R with Keep Punching (1939).
