= Curtis Mosby =

American jazz drummer and bandleader (c. 1895–1957)

- Born: Kansas City, Missouri
- Died: June 25, 1957; San Francisco, California
- Genres: Jazz
- Occupation(s): Jazz drummer and businessman
- Instrument: Drums

Curtis J. Mosby (July 7, 1895 (or 1892) in Kansas City, Missouri – June 25, 1957 in San Francisco) was an American jazz drummer, bandleader, and businessman.

== Biography ==
Mosby toured with the Tennessee Ten in the 1910s, and also led his own ensemble in Chicago. He then moved to California early in the 1920s, where he opened a record store and then toured with Mamie Smith. He also led a band called the Blue Blowers in California and appeared with them in the 1929 film Music Hath Harms. He took an extended residency in 1924 at Solomon's Dance Pavilion in Los Angeles; this ensemble recorded privately, and some of these cuts have survived. The band recorded for Columbia Records in 1927, and included Jake Porter, Les Hite, and Henry Starr as sidemen. In 1927 they played at the Bronx Palm Gardens and in 1928 at the Lincoln Theater.

Mosby opened his own nightclub, the Apex, in 1928, and his band appeared in the films Thunderbolt and King Vidor's Hallelujah the next year. Late in 1929 a police raid shut the club down, but he reopened after an acquittal soon after. He opened another club in San Francisco at the end of 1930. He went bankrupt in 1931, and moved to San Francisco. Over the course of the 1930s he opened several clubs, not all of them successful, along the California coastline; musicians who appeared in his bands included Lawrence Brown, Marshal Royal, Wilbert Baranco, Baron Moorehead, and Buck Clayton.

Mosby and Leon Hefflin Sr. financed and produced the Sweet N' Hot musical featuring Dorothy Dandridge and a cast of 50, at the Mayan theatre in Los Angeles in 1944. He also eventually has his 15-piece band as part of the production after reviews made suggestion. It successfully runs nightly for eleven weeks.

His successful Club Alabam featured Harlan Leonard in 1943, Roy Milton in 1944, and Johnny Otis in 1945, all in succession. He was jailed for tax evasion from 1947 to 1949 and lost control of his clubs; after serving his time, he reopened some of them and then permanently moved to San Francisco. In 1947, Leon Hefflin Sr. took over Club Alabam and renamed it the Congo Club.

He declared bankruptcy in the late 1940s, but he had hidden the part ownership of Club Alabam and other assets from the creditors and bankruptcy court. As a result he served a short prison term.
