= Henrietta Loveless =

American actress and singer

- Henrietta Loveless (1932)
- Born: August 26, 1903; Polk County, Georgia, US
- Died: March 1956 (aged 52)
- Other names: Henrietta Lovelass; Henrietta Lovelace
- Occupations: Actress and singer
- Years active: 1925–1944

Henrietta L. Loveless (August 26, 1903 – March, 1956), sometimes spelled Henrietta Lovelass or Henrietta Lovelace, was an American actress and singer. After graduating with a degree in music from Fisk University, Loveless acted in several films and numerous theatre shows during the 1920s and early 1930s. The latter half of the 1930s saw her move to exclusively vocal performances, including as a part of a harmony group at the 1939 New York World's Fair and in her own musical radio broadcast.

== Childhood and education ==
Born in Polk County, Georgia, Loveless began performing in skits and shows at the age of 13 before attending the Alabama Teachers College and then receiving scholarships for Shaw University and Fisk University, which she attended in succession. She graduated in 1921 from Fisk University with a degree in music and voice. During her time at the university, she joined the Mozart Society and performed as a soprano singer in a 1916 production of The Dream of Gerontius. She would also continue her studies later in her life by attending the Boston Conservatory.

== Career ==
Loveless began acting in theatre after her graduation starting with shows at the Lafayette Theatre, starring in two performances in 1925 named Aces and Queens and Playing the Numbers, and in films including The Spider's Web in 1926. During the latter half of 1926, she began touring with Irvin C. Miller in his show Blue Moon as the leading lady, before joining the 1927 Chappelle and Stinette tour production of Kentucky Sue. She acted for two seasons in the 1932 Broadway revival of Show Boat and worked as the understudy for the role of "Queeny". After the completion of the musical's run, Loveless left New York and moved to Hollywood to seek other acting opportunities. The Post-Star in 1937 referred to Loveless as the "creole version of Sophie Tucker".

After her theatre career, Loveless began working on writing songs and singing opera, joining a "harmony group" named the Chocolate Éclair Family that first became broadly popular after performing at the 1939 New York World's Fair in the Court of Flame building. She would then go on to host an hour-long show on NBC named after her and featuring her singing in the early 1940s. One of the songs she co-wrote in 1942 with her husband was A Fool Must Have His Day. She had her first solo singing concert debut on February 13, 1944, at St. Martin's Little Theatre in New York City.

== Personal life ==
Loveless married fellow performer Lorenzo McLane and they starred in theatre shows together and had a songwriting career throughout the 1940s. After becoming ill in January 1956, she died in late March of the same year.

== Shows ==
- Lucky Sambo (Aces and Queens) (1925)
- Playing the Numbers (1925)
- Blue Moon (1926)
- Kentucky Sue (1927)
- Hit the Deck (1927)
- Show Boat (1932) as Queeny
- Sing Out the News
- John Henry
- Mexican Mural

== Films ==
- The Spider's Web (1926) as Mary Austin, a widow
- Lem Hawkins' Confession / Murder in Harlem (1935)
