= Lucky Ghost =

1942 film by William Beaudine

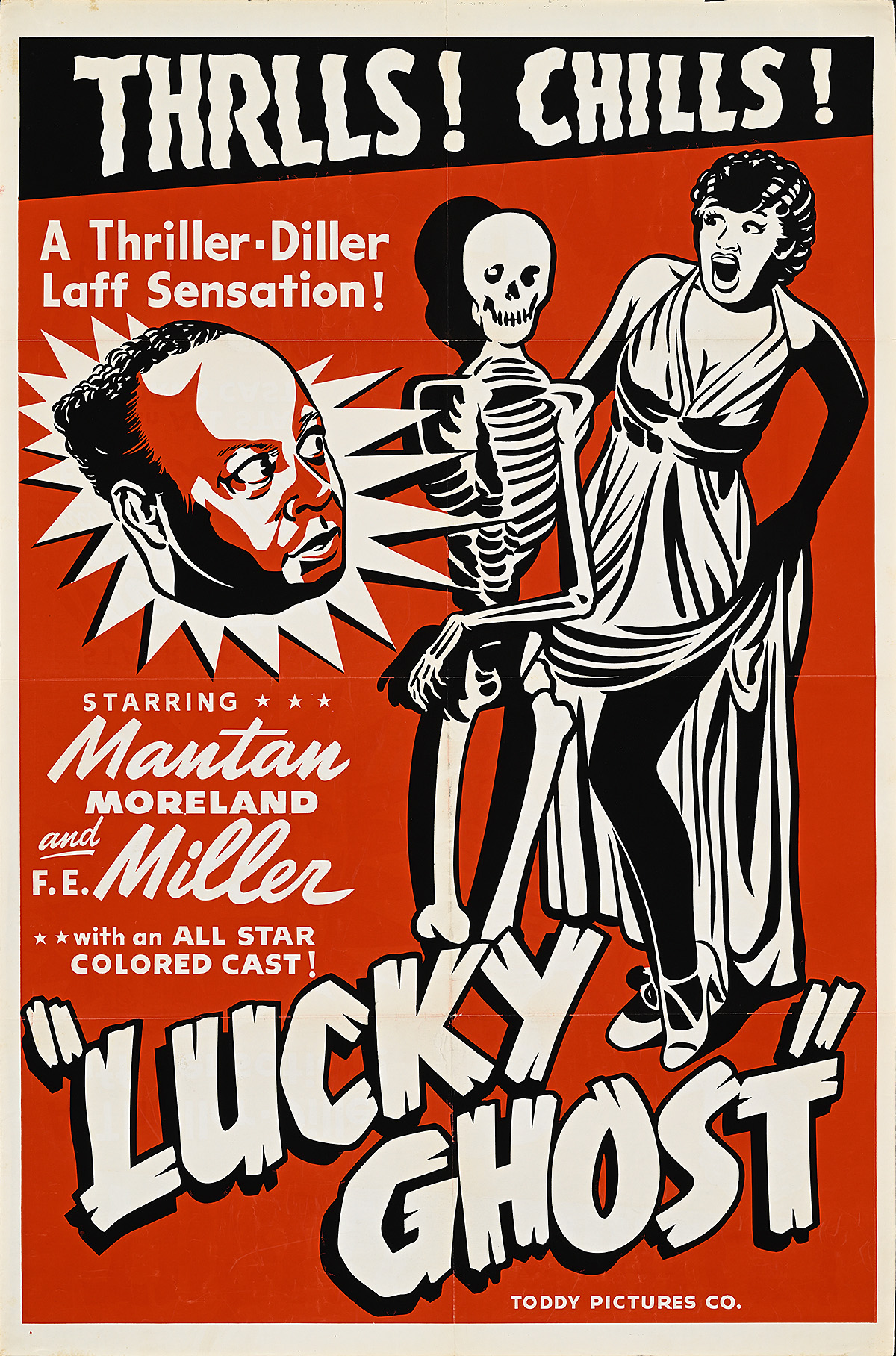
- Poster for initial theatrical release
- Directed by: William Beaudine
- Written by: Lex Neal (story) and Vernon Smith (story)
- Produced by: Jed Buell (producer); Maceo Bruce Sheffield (associate producer)
- Starring: See below
- Cinematography: Robert E. Cline
- Edited by: Robert O. Crandall
- Music by: Don Swander
- Release date: 1942
- Running time: 61 minutes
- Country: United States
- Language: English

Lucky Ghost is a 1942 American film directed by William Beaudine. The film is a sequel to the 1941 film Mr. Washington Goes to Town. The film is also known as Lady Luck (new American title).

== Plot ==
Washington Delaware Jones has never done much good for his town, and ultimately he is ordered by a judge to leave for good. In following the judge's order he brings his friend and collaborator Jefferson, and the two men go on a search for a new place to live.

Both lack professional experience and start thinking about what kind of jobs they might get. Since they both agree on liking food, they decide on becoming food tasters. When they come to the first destination on the road, they pretend to be food inspectors and start stealing chickens from a farm, but the farmer shoots at them. They meet a man of some wealth named Brown, whose car has stopped alongside the road, and his friend Dawson.

While Brown's chauffeur runs along to find gas, the four remaining men start throwing dice. Washington and Jefferson win all the other two have, including the car, and they are driven by the chauffeur to a nearby country club run by Dr. Brutus Blake. Blake is a swindler, and when he sees the two men arrive in their elegant car, he decides to take all they have. Blake arranges a crap game where outcome is fixed to his advantage. Since Blake's partner Blackstone doesn't approve of his tactics, they argue, and Blackstone threaten to reveal to the guests what Blake is up to.

Blake has a thing for the club hostess, and later that night he sees Washington dance with her. He becomes jealous and challenges Washington to a fight. Blake manages to knock himself out during the fight, and when he wakes up he is more determined than ever to take the two guests' money.

Everyone is unaware that the place is haunted by Blake's dead relatives, who are quite disappointed with how Blake has turned out. They also regret leaving the place to him in their wills and send one of them, uncle Ezra Dewey, to set Blake straight.

The gambling begins, and soon Washington and Jefferson have won the whole club from Blake through shooting craps. Ezra finds that the place is just as sinful and decadent under the management of Washington and Jefferson as it was under Blake. The former owners start scheming to get the place back, and they get the local sheriff to arrest them for made-up criminal offenses.

Ezra finds out about Blake's wicked plans and scares him off. All the ghosts then scare off Washington and Jefferson by haunting the club, and the two men flee for their lives.

== Cast ==
- Mantan Moreland as Washington
- F.E. Miller as Jefferson
- Maceo Bruce Sheffield as Dr. Brutus Blake
- Arthur Ray as Blackstone
- Florence O'Brien as Hostess
- Harold Garrison as Dawson
- Jessie Cryer as Dawson
- Napoleon Whiting as Chauffeur
- Jess Lee Brooks as Door Man
- Ida Coffin as Hat Check Girl
- Nathan Curry as Farmer
- Millie Monroe as First Waitress
- Louise Franklin as Second Waitress
- Lucille Battle as Third Waitress
- Avanelle Harris as Fourth Waitress
- Monte Hawley as Masher
- Vernon McCalla as First Man Guest
- Harry Levette as First Man Diner
- Henry Hastings as Uncle Ezra's Ghost
- Florence Field as Mrs. Ezra's Ghost
- John Lester Johnson as First Ghost
- Edward Thompson as Second Ghost
- Lester Christmas as Third Ghost
- Reginald Fenderson as Dealer

== Soundtrack ==
- Lorenza Flennoy and His Chocolate Drops - "If Anybody Cares" (Written by Don Swander and June Hershey)
- Lorenza Flennoy and His Chocolate Drops - "When You Think of Loving, Think of Me" (Written by Don Swander and June Hershey)
- Lorenza Flennoy and His Chocolate Drops - "Can't Use It Anymore" (Written by Don Swander and June Hershey)
- Lorenza Flennoy and His Chocolate Drops - "Down in Old Darktown"
