= Maceo Bruce Sheffield =

American film producer

Maceo Bruce Sheffield (September 8, 1897 – August 20, 1959) was a police detective and an actor in American films. He worked in Los Angeles as a policeman before acting and assisting in the production of films with African American casts. He was also a stuntman and pilot. He portrayed a swindler in Lucky Ghost as Dr. Brutus Blake in the sequel to Mr. Washington Goes to Town. He was the associate producer of both Lucky Ghost and Mr. Washington Goes to Town.

He was notorious for his work as a police officer with the Black press describing him as someone who beat people up and he and his partner producing a large number of arrests of African Americans. Protests in 1927 resulted from his shooting in the head of a suspect. He later owned a cafe and club.

He was critical of the opportunities for African Americans in the film industry and referred to the exploited actors as "stooges". He was involved with the production company behind Harlem on the Prairie, a groundbreaking Western themed musical film featuring Black actors. He is credited with inspiring Count Basie's song "Every Tub".

== Filmography ==
- The Adventures of Tarzan (1921) as Waziri Chief
- Harlem on the Prairie (1937) as Wolf Cain
- Double Deal (1939)
- Reform School (1939)
- Gang War (1939) as Bull Brown
- Up Jumped the Devil (1941) as Bad News Johnson
- Mr. Washington Goes to Town (1942) as Brutus Blake
- Lucky Ghost (1942) as Dr. Brutus Blake
- Professor Creeps (1942) as Shylock the Landlord
- Look-Out Sister (1946)
