= Christie Film Company =

Early motion picture company in the United States

Coordinates: 34.098280°N 118.322558°W

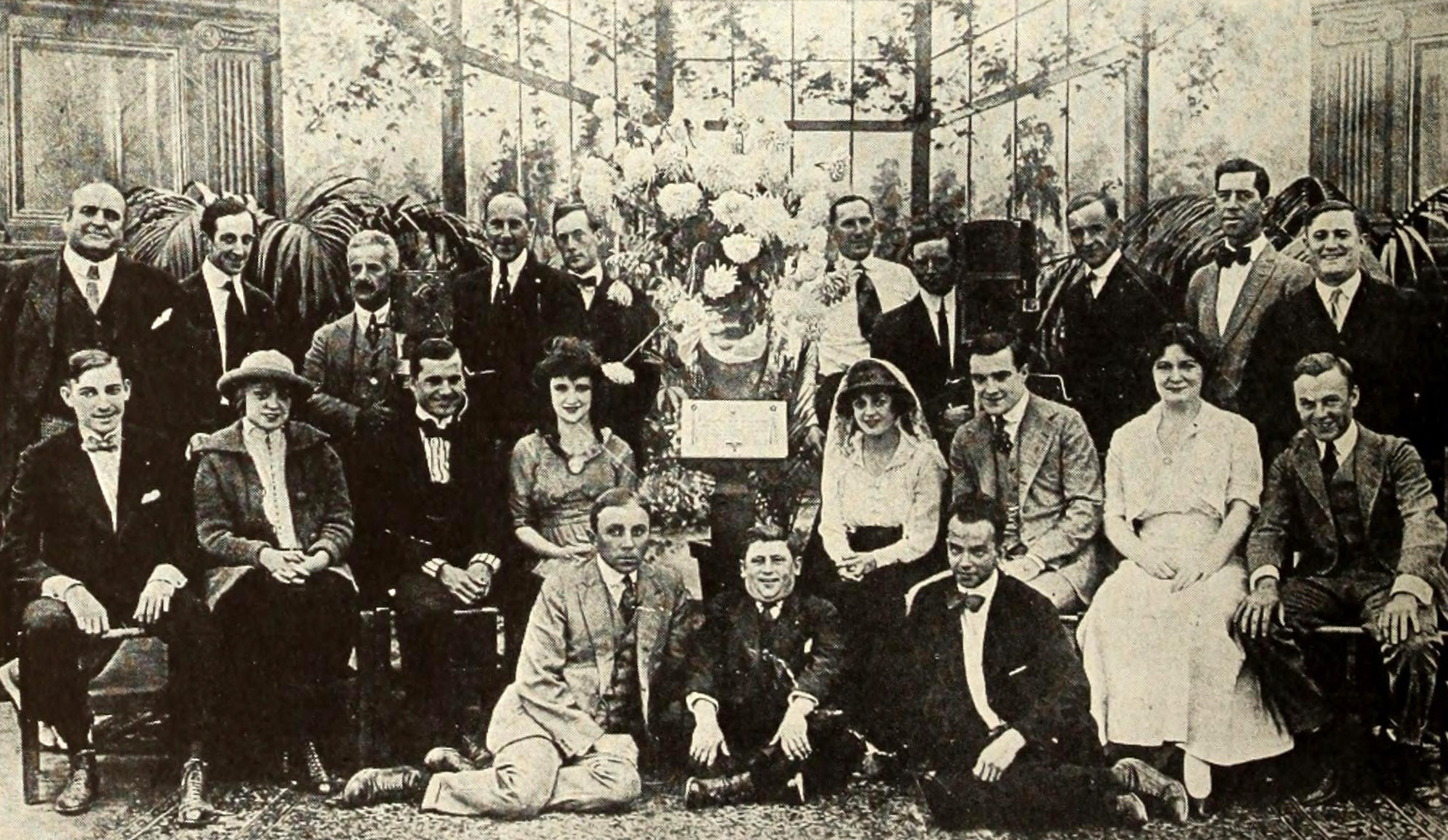
Al Christie's troupe, circa 1916.

Christie Film Company was an American pioneer motion picture company founded in Hollywood, California by Al Christie and Charles Christie, two brothers from London, Ontario, Canada. It made comedies.

While Charles served almost exclusively in administration, it was Al Christie who made the films. Al had worked with David Horsley at his Centaur Film Company in Bayonne, New Jersey and moved to California on October 27, 1911, to run Nestor Studios, the first ever motion picture studio in Hollywood. The firm closed in 1933.

== The Christies in Hollywood ==
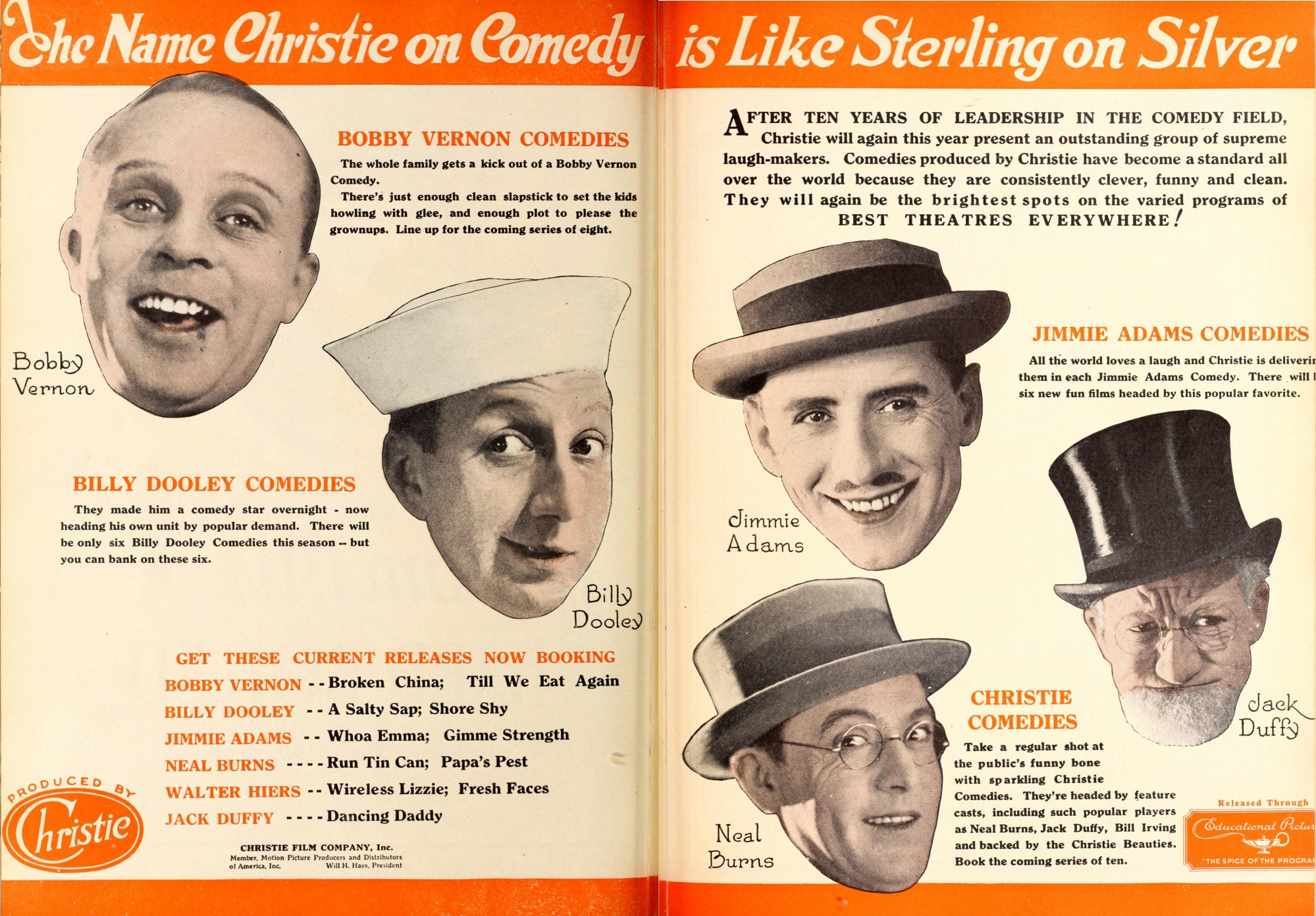
Advertisement for Christie's comedies, 1926

In June 1912, Nestor Studios became part of the newly-formed Universal Film Company and Al Christie was put in charge of the comedy companies. He remained with Universal Film until January 1916 at which time he and his brother, Charles Christie, formed their own movie studio named the Christie Film Company. The two rented facilities from Universal at Sunset Boulevard and Gower Street, the place where Al Christie had first started in Hollywood. For the first six months of operations, the new Christie Film Company made comedies under a contract with Universal Film. In July of that year, the company began producing other comedies to sell to the independent distributors and their immediate success was such that they were soon able to finance the acquisition of their studio property. Within a short time, the Christie brothers doubled their stage capacity and constructed a film laboratory equipped with the latest in technology.

Unlike some of the "over the top comedies" being produced at the time, Christie Studios emphasized situational comedy that sometimes featured show girls in skimpy costumes. As comedy specialists, the Christie Film Company debuted comedy actors Harold Lloyd, Fatty Arbuckle, Anita Garvin, and Spencer Williams, later known for his portrayal of Andy Brown in the Amos & Andy CBS Television series. The innovative Christie company began issuing Film Follies, a magazine advertising the latest films and events at the studio.

In 1921, Canadian Mary Pickford was a driving force behind the creation of the Motion Picture Relief Fund, an organization designed to help actors who had fallen on hard times. Christie Film Company supported this and Charles Christie played a major role, serving on the first Board of Trustees.

By 1922, the brothers were so successful that they set up Christie Realty Corporation (CRC) with $1 million in capital stock. In 1923 CRC bought 230 acres of land in the Westwood section of Los Angeles with plans to build a studio estimated to cost more than $1.75 million dollars (including the value of the land).

The Christie brothers welcomed Canadian talent and stars such as Marie Dressler and Marie Prevost appeared in their films and became lifelong friends. In 1928, they hired Florence Ryerson to write several short films, including Hot Lemonade. Al Christie also hired African-American Spencer Williams as a sound technician but soon recognized Williams' many talents and involved him in script writing. In early 1929, the Christie Film Company began making the first series of talking pictures written and conceived exclusively for African-American performers. They produced a number of comedy-musical shorts that featured an all-black cast from the Lafayette Players Stock Company out of Harlem, New York. The films, based on the popular Saturday Evening Post's Darktown Birmingham stories by Octavus Roy Cohen (1891-1959), were distributed by Paramount Studios.

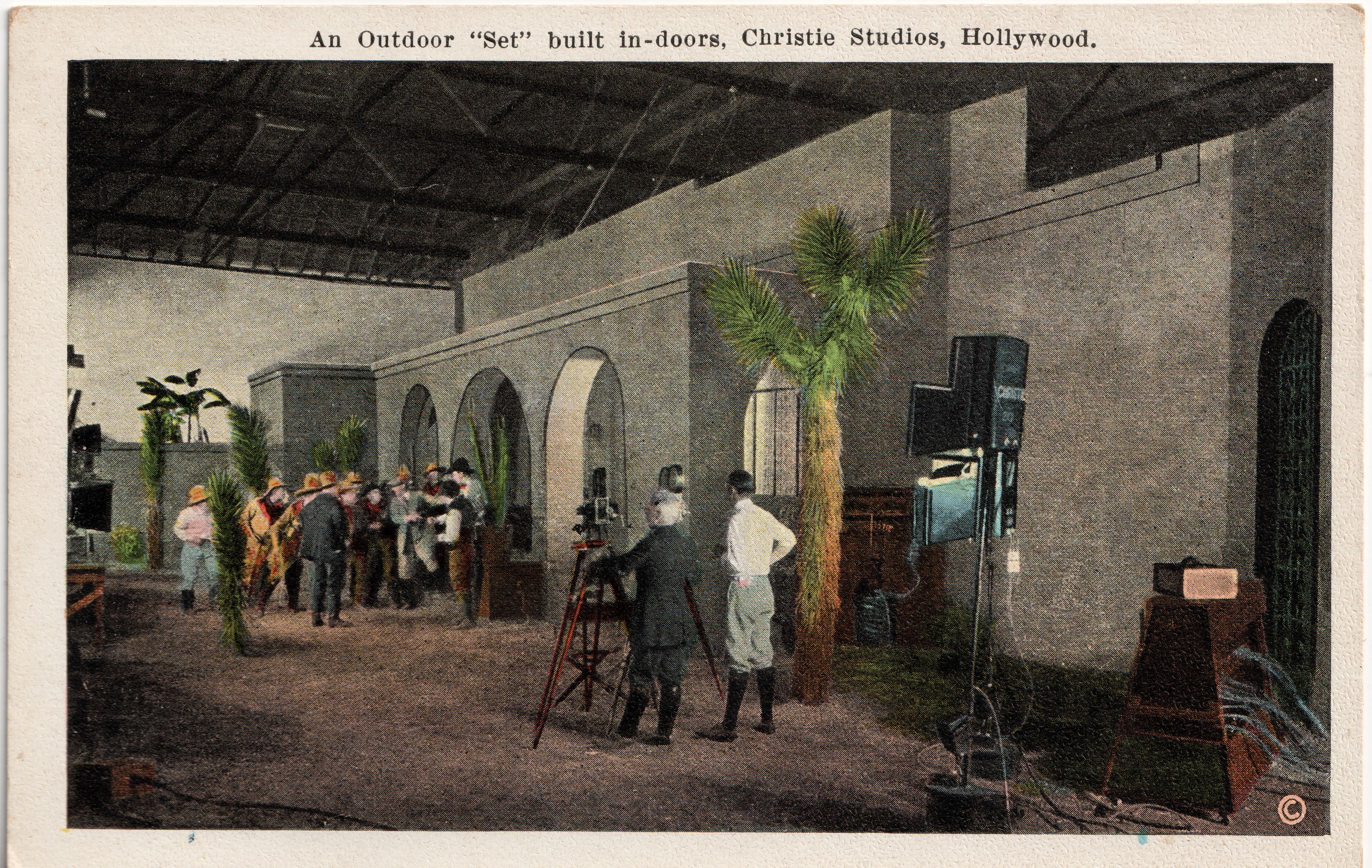
An outdoor "set" built indoors, Christie Studios, circa 1920s

== Demise of company ==
However, the Stock Market Crash of 1929 and the ensuing Great Depression devastated many businesses and in January 1933, the Christie brothers companies went into receivership and their studio assets were acquired by another large film making company. The liquidation process began on May 26, 1932, as an attorney was instructed to begin the process of turning assets of the film company and the realty company to an assignee, which essentially put the firms into a receivership. Combined assets of the companies were estimated to be $2.5 million - $3 million, and total indebtedness was approximately $2.5 million.

In 1950 Sam Hayes gained television rights for 426 Christie comedies as part of a larger deal with Hollywood Film Enterprises.

== Gallery of Female Christie Comics ==
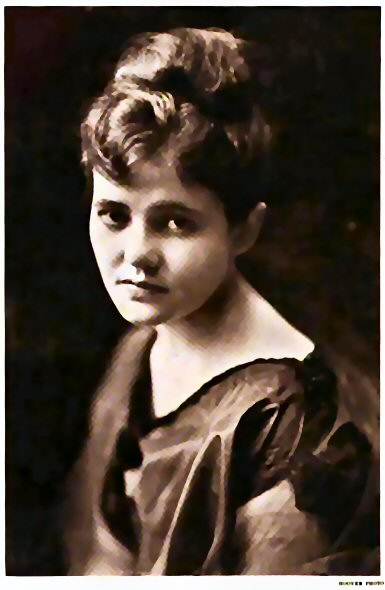
Teddy Sampson

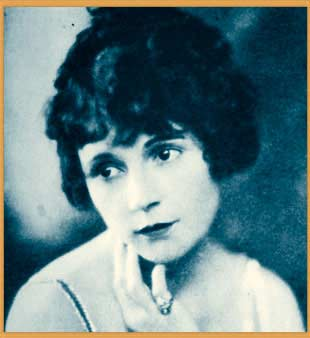
Dorothy Devore

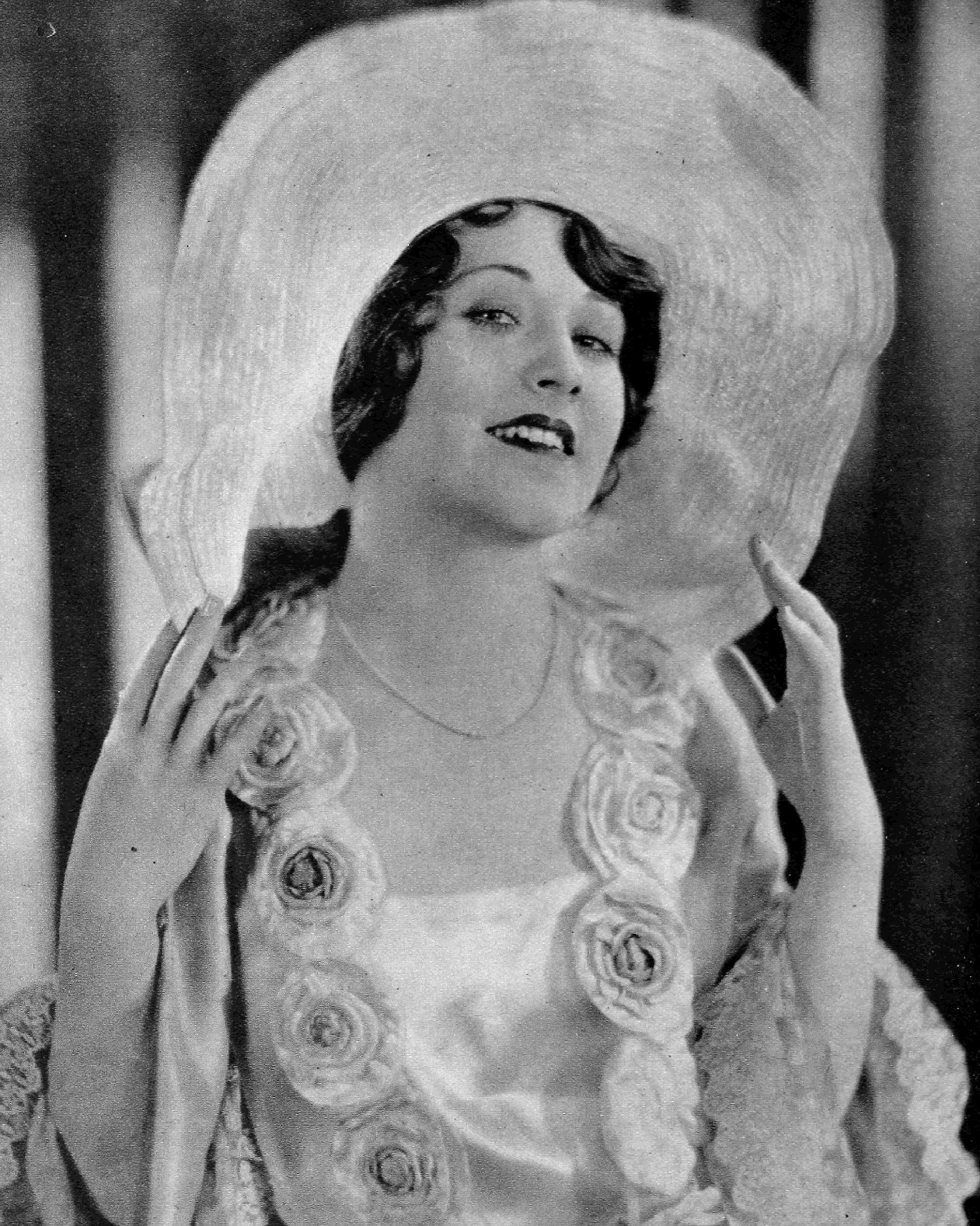
Ann Christy

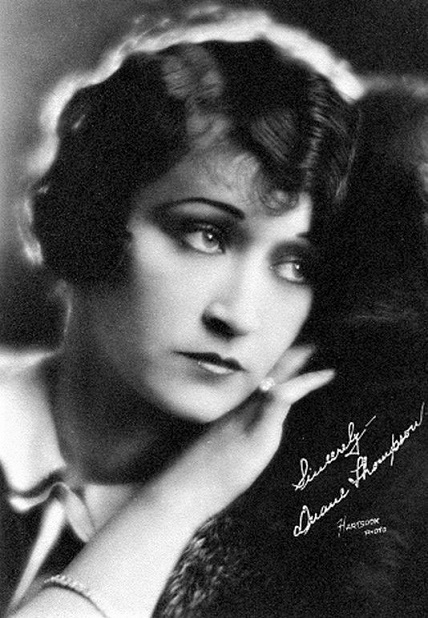
Duane Thompson

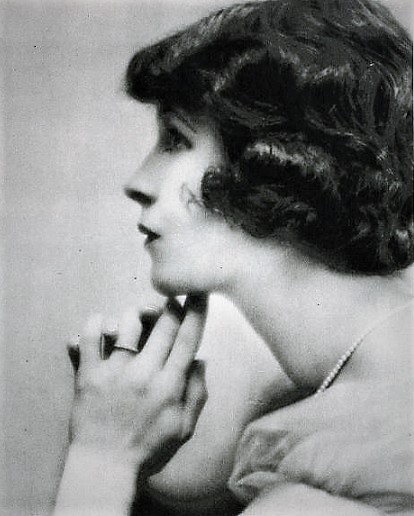
Anne Cornwall
