= Oft in the Silly Night =

1929 American short comedy film

Oft in the Silly Night is an American short comedy film released in 1929. It was produced by Al Christie from a story by Octavus Roy Cohen, part of a series published in the Saturday Evening Post and adapted to film in Christie productions. Among the early "talkie" films featuring an African American cast, the film survives and is available online.

The plot has a chauffeur sneaking out with his employer's car and daughter. The film and the series feature exaggerated "Negro" dialect and stereotypes.

The film was re-released on the DVD Birmingham Black Bottom in 2003.

== Cast ==
- Edward Thompson as Temus Robinson
- Roberta Hyson as Mezanine Conner
- Arthur Ray as Julip Conner
- Spencer Williams as Eli Rubb
- Laurence Criner as L. J. Criner

== See also ==
- "Oft in the Stilly Night", a poem by Thomas Moore and folk song adapted from it
