= The Framing of the Shrew =

1929 film

The Framing of the Shrew is a 1929 American comedy film. It features an African American cast. It was produced by Al Christie and the story was by Octavus Roy Cohen. It was directed by Arvid E. Gillstrom. The plot depicts a husband who gets the upper hand on his wife using various tactics.

Framing of the Shrew was one in a series of films made from Cohen's stories featuring the same characters portrayed by established African American actors and vaudeville performers.

== Synopsis ==
Privacy Robson decides that he must be free of his wife, Clarry, as she has been pushing for him to find a job. His friend Florian Slappey advises him to go on a hunger strike to get even with her. Privacy takes this advice, however he is unable to resist sneaking some of his wife's cooking even after declining to eat supper. In the end Privacy wins out and is able to continue his daily routine.

== Cast ==
- Evelyn Preer as Clarry Robson
- Edward Thompson as Privacy Robson
- Charles Olden as Florian Slappey
- Spencer Williams as Lawyer Evans Chew
- Roberta Hyson as Mallissie Cheese

== Reception ==
In his book The First Hollywood Sound Shorts, 1926-1931, Edwin M. Bradley noted that the film "plays more overtly to the white vision of the shiftless black male".
