= Spirit of Youth =

1938 film by Harry L. Fraser

- Directed by: Harry L. Fraser
- Written by: Arthur Hoerl
- Produced by: Lew Golder
- Starring: Joe Louis; Clarence Muse; Edna Mae Harris
- Cinematography: Robert E. Cline
- Edited by: Carl Pierson
- Music by: Elliot Carpenter; Clarence Muse
- Production company: Globe Pictures Corp.
- Distributed by: Grand National Films Inc.
- Release dates: January 20, 1938 (Washington, DC); April 1, 1938 (US); November 4, 1938 (London)
- Running time: 66 minutes
- Country: United States
- Language: English

Spirit of Youth is a 1938 boxing film directed by Harry L. Fraser and starring then-heavyweight world champion Joe Louis, in a story with similarities to his own real life.

== Plot ==
A rising boxer is led astray by a woman.

== Cast ==
- Joe Louis as Joe Thomas
- Clarence Muse as Frankie Walburn
- Edna Mae Harris as Mary Bowdin
- Mae Turner as Flora Bailey
- Cleo Desmond as Nora Thomas
- Mantan Moreland as Creighton "Crickie" Fitzgibbons
- Jewel Smith as Duke Emerald
- Tom Southern as Dr. Bowdin
- Jess Lee Brooks as Jeff Thomas (as Jesse Lee Brooks)
- Marguerite Whitten as Eleanor Thomas (as Margaret Whitten)
- Clarence Brooks as Speedy
- The Plantation Choir as Church Choir
- The Creole Chorus as The Creole Chorus
- The Big Apple Dancers as Dancers
