= Professor Creeps =

1942 film

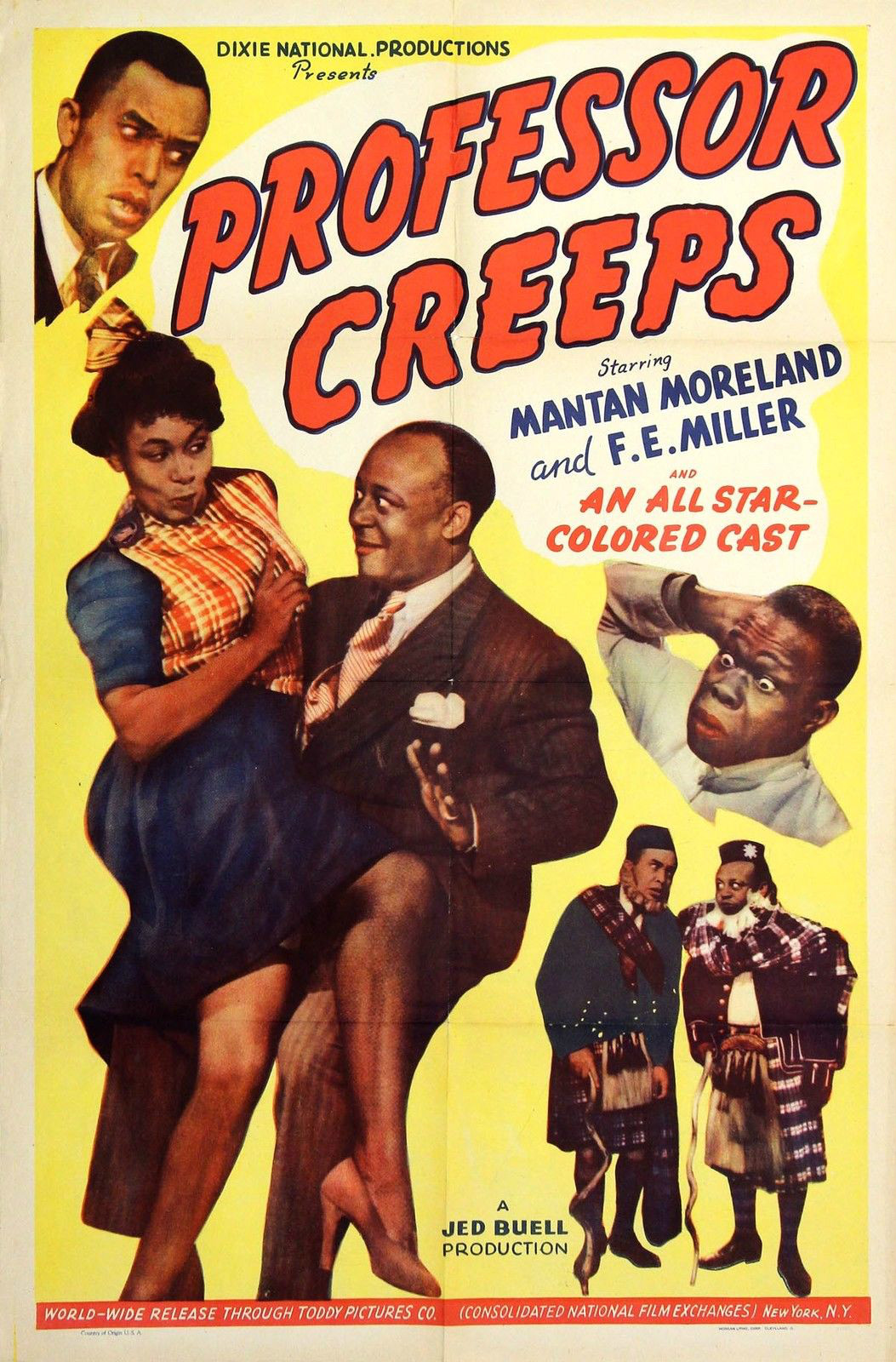
- Film poster
- Directed by: William Beaudine
- Written by: William Beaudine
- Produced by: Jed Buell
- Starring: Mantan Moreland
- Cinematography: Arthur Martinelli
- Release date: February 28, 1942
- Running time: 63 minutes
- Country: United States
- Language: English

Professor Creeps is a 1942 American comedy film directed by William Beaudine and starring Mantan Moreland.

== Cast ==
- Mantan Moreland as Washington
- F. E. Miller as Jefferson
- Arthur Ray as Professor Whackingham Creeps
- Florence O'Brien as Daffodil Dixon
- Maceo Bruce Sheffield as Shylock the Landlord
- John Lester Johnson as Keeper
- Marguerite Whitten as Mrs. Green
- Shelton Brooks as Jackson
- Jessie Cryer as Mr. Green
