= John Lester Johnson =

American boxer and actor (1893–1968)

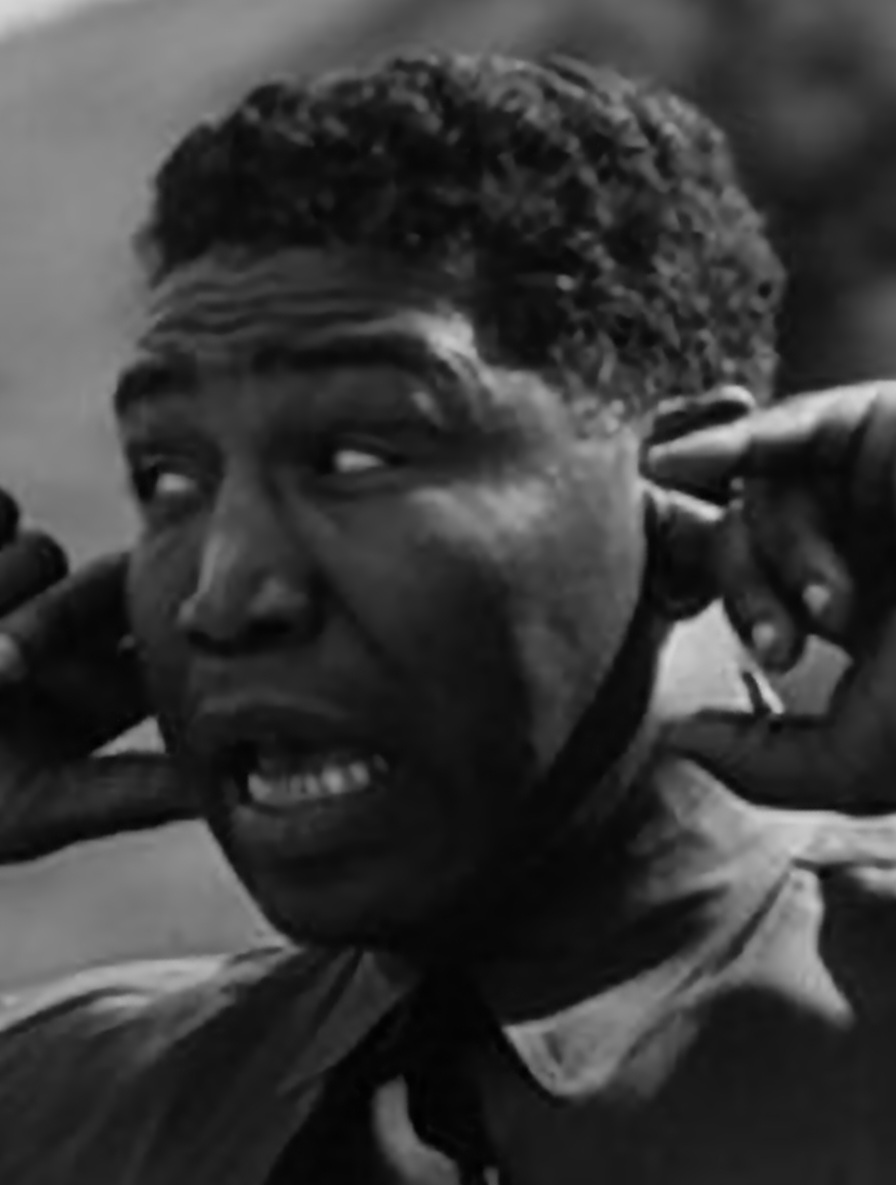
- Johnson in Tarzan's Revenge (1938)
- Born: John Leslie Johnson; August 13, 1893; Suffolk, Virginia, U.S.
- Died: March 27, 1968 (aged 74); West Los Angeles, California, U.S.
- Occupations: Boxer, actor
- Years active: 1922–1942
- Spouse: Lulu Dill
- Boxing career
- Height: 5 ft 11 1/2 in (182 cm)
- Weight: Light heavyweight; Heavyweight

Boxing record
- Total fights: 74
- Wins: 39
- Win by KO: 23
- Losses: 29
- Draws: 6

John Lester Johnson (born John Leslie Johnson; August 13, 1893 – March 27, 1968) was an American professional boxer and actor. He is perhaps best known for his 1916 boxing match against Jack Dempsey, and his 1933 performance as Bumbo, the titular character in the Our Gang comedy short The Kid From Borneo.

== Early life and boxing career ==
Johnson was born in Aug. 13, 1893, in Suffolk, Virginia, one of 11 children. During World War I Johnson served in the 367th Infantry, a Buffalo Soldier outfit of the United States Army.

From 1912-1929, Johnson amassed a professional boxing record of 39-29-6, with 23 of his wins by knockout. In 1916 Johnson fought future world heavyweight champion Jack Dempsey to a 10-round draw, during which Dempsey suffered several broken ribs. Although a draw, Dempsey later said, "I thought he [Johnson] licked me. I didn't know how to fight then and Johnson did. Yes, I think he won."

Johnson also had fights against the notable boxers Joe Jeanette, Harry Wills, Kid Norfolk, and Bill Tate.

== Acting career ==
Colorized image of John Lester Johnson as Bumbo, in The Kid From Borneo

Johnson appeared in the 1933 Our Gang comedy The Kid From Borneo as Bumbo, a circus attraction billed as a "Wild Man from Borneo." Garbed in elaborate tribal attire and repetitively saying "Yum Yum, eat 'em up!" at the sight of candy, Bumbo is mistaken by some of the Our Gang children as both a cannibal and their Uncle George, the latter earlier described by their mother as "the black sheep of the family." A frenetic chase ensues when Bumbo attempts to take the children's candy, during which he and the children demolish much of a home's furnishings.

Along with two Three Stooges films, Johnson's other film credits include Radio Patrol (1932), A Scream in the Night (1934), The Glory Trail (1936), Tarzan's Revenge (1938), Mr. Washington Goes to Town (1942), and Professor Creeps (1942).

== Illness and death ==
In a 1960 article published in Ebony, Johnson disclosed that following his acting career he worked as a special officer at Cheli Air Force Station, and that he suffered a series of disabling strokes in the late 1950s, resulting in partial paralysis. Johnson lived at the Veterans Administration Hospital in West Los Angeles until his death in 1968.
