= The Devil's Disciple (1926 film) =

1926 film

- Directed by: Oscar Micheaux
- Written by: Oscar Micheaux
- Produced by: Oscar Micheaux
- Starring: Evelyn Preer; Lawrence Chenault
- Distributed by: Micheaux Film
- Release date: 1926
- Country: United States
- Language: Silent

The Devil's Disciple (1926) is an American silent melodrama film with a primarily African-American cast, written and directed by Oscar Micheaux, on the subject of white slavery in New York City.

== Plot summary ==
In Harlem, a beautiful, vain African-American girl falls in love with a degenerate man. She is not able to reform him and is herself dragged down in the gutter because of him.

== Cast ==
- Evelyn Preer
- Lawrence Chenault
