= Evelyn Preer =

American actress and singer (1896–1932)

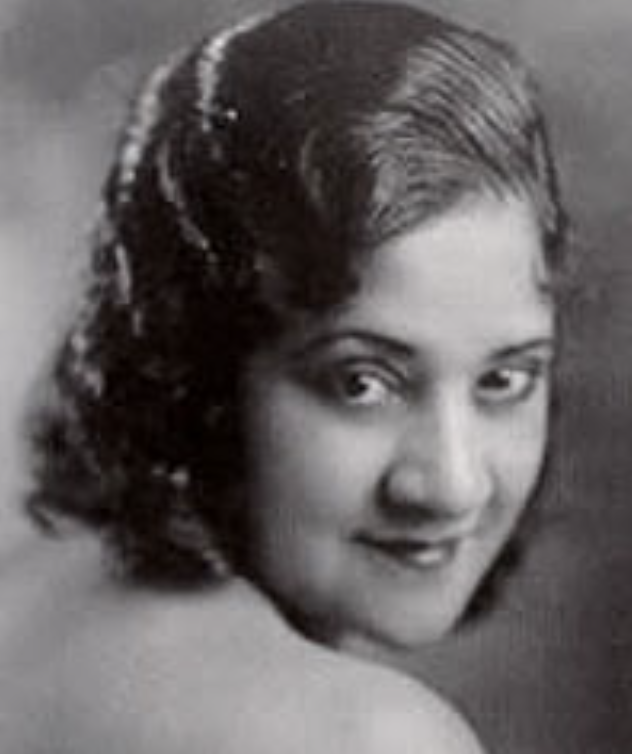
- Preer c. 1920
- Born: Evelyn Jarvis; July 26, 1896; Vicksburg, Mississippi, U.S.
- Died: November 17, 1932 (aged 36); Los Angeles, California, U.S.
- Other name: Evelyn Preer Thompson
- Occupations: Actress, singer
- Years active: 1919–1932
- Spouses: Frank Preer (m. 1915; div. 1923) Edward Thompson (m. 1924)
- Children: Francesca Thompson

Evelyn Preer (née Jarvis; July 26, 1896 – November 17, 1932), was an African American pioneering screen and stage actress, and jazz and blues singer in Hollywood during the late-1910s through the early 1930s. Preer was known within the Black community as "The First Lady of the Screen."

She was the first Black actress to earn celebrity and popularity. She appeared in ground-breaking films and stage productions, such as the first play by a black playwright to be produced on Broadway, and the first New York–style production with a black cast in California in 1928, in a revival of a play adapted from Somerset Maugham's Rain.

== Early life ==
Evelyn Jarvis was born in Vicksburg, Mississippi, on July 26, 1896. After her father, Frank, died prematurely, she moved with her mother, Blanche, and her three other siblings to Chicago, Illinois. She completed grammar school and high school in Chicago. Her early experiences in vaudeville and "street preaching" with her mother are what jump-started her acting career.

== Career in cinema ==
At the age of 23, Preer's first film role was in Oscar Micheaux's 1919 debut film The Homesteader, in which she played Orlean. Preer was promoted by Micheaux as his leading actress with a steady tour of personal appearances and a publicity campaign, she was one of the first African American women to become a star to the black community. She also acted in Micheaux's Within Our Gates (1920), in which she plays Sylvia Landry, a teacher who needs to raise money to save her school.

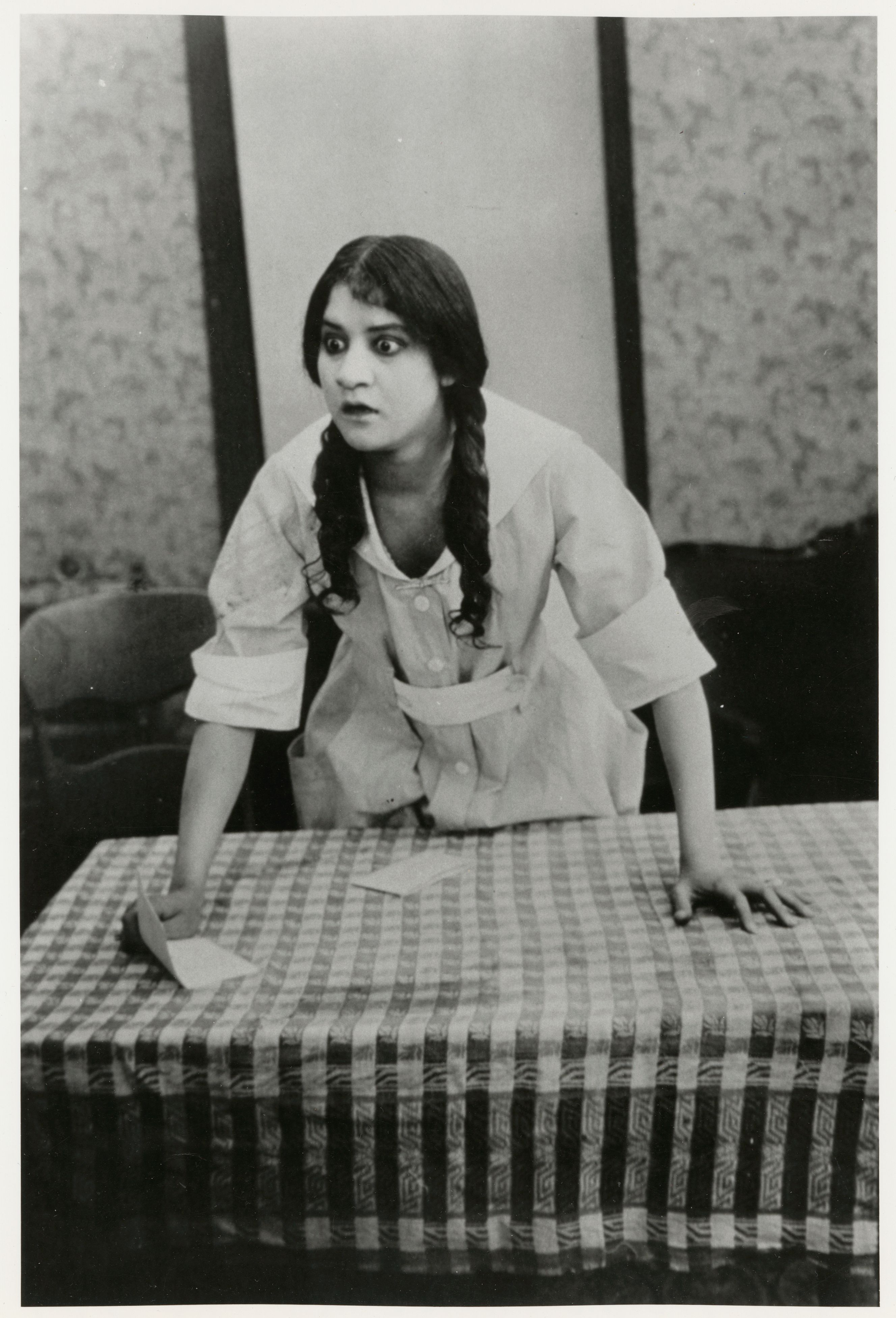
Still from the 1919 Oscar Micheaux film Within Our Gates

She continued her career by starring in 19 films. Micheaux developed many of his subsequent films to showcase Preer's versatility. These included The Brute (1920), The Gunsaulus Mystery (1921), Deceit (1923), Birthright (1924), The Devil’s Disciple (1926), The Conjure Woman (1926) and The Spider's Web (1926). Preer had her talkie debut in the race musical Georgia Rose (1930). In 1931, she performed with Sylvia Sidney in the film Ladies of the Big House. Her final film performance was as Lola, a prostitute, in Josef von Sternberg's 1932 film Blonde Venus, with Cary Grant and Marlene Dietrich. Preer was lauded by both the black and white press for her ability to continually succeed in ever more challenging roles, "...her roles ran the gamut from villain to heroine an attribute that many black actresses who worked in Hollywood cinema history did not have the privilege or luxury to enjoy." Only her film by Micheaux and three shorts survive. She was known for refusing to play roles that she believed demeaned African Americans.

== Career in theatre ==
In 1920, Preer joined The Lafayette Players a theatrical stock company in Chicago that was founded in 1915 by Anita Bush, a pioneering stage and film actress known as “The Little Mother of Black Drama". Bush and her troupe toured the US to bring legitimate theatre to black audiences at a time when theatres were racially segregated by law in the South, and often by custom in the North and the interest of vaudeville was fading. The Lafayette Players brought drama to black audiences, which caused it to flourish until its end during the Great Depression.

By the mid-1920s, Preer began garnering attention from the white press, and she began to appear in crossover films and stage parts. In 1923, she acted in the Ethiopian Art Theatre's production of The Chip Woman's Fortune by Willis Richardson. This was the first dramatic play by an African-American playwright to be produced on Broadway, and it lasted two weeks. In 1926, Preer appeared on Broadway in David Belasco’s production of Lulu Belle. Preer supported and understudied Lenore Ulric in the leading role of Edward Sheldon's drama of a Harlem prostitute. She garnered acclaim in Sadie Thompson in a West Coast revival of Somerset Maugham’s play about a fallen woman.

She rejoined the Lafayette Players for that production in their first show in Los Angeles at the Lincoln Center. Under the leadership of Robert Levy, Preer and her colleagues performed in the first New York–style play featuring black players to be produced in California. That year, she also appeared in Rain, a play adapted from Maugham's short story by the same name.

Preer also sang in cabaret and musical theater where she was occasionally backed by such diverse musicians as Duke Ellington and Red Nichols early in their careers. Preer was regarded by many as the greatest actress of her time.

== Marriage and family ==
Preer married Frank Preer on January 16, 1915, in Chicago. She met her second husband, Edward Thompson, when they were both acting with the Lafayette Players in Chicago. They married February 4, 1924, in Williamson County, Tennessee. Some sources indicate Preer was married to Lawrence Chenault.

In April 1932, Preer gave birth to her only child, daughter Edeve Thompson.

== Death ==
Developing post-childbirth complications, Preer died of pneumonia on November 17, 1932, in Los Angeles at the age of 36.

Evelyn Preer was only sick for 48 hours, but it was fatal. She was feeling ill and thought it was just a cold, but she soon went unconscious. She was in a coma and only woke up to say, “Where is my baby?” Many friends tried to visit her but were not allowed. Her husband was only allowed at her bedside for two minutes as they were trying to save her.

The Associated Press sent the news of her death to the whole world because of how famous she was. At her funeral, they had a curtain made from blossoms to act as a theater curtain in its last act of closing. They had people close to her acting as people who worked at a theater, and many people were present at her funeral. Etta Moten sang the spiritual that Evelyn would sing in “Porgy.” The hundreds of people ended the funeral by going to look at her face one more time.

Her husband continued as a popular leading man and "heavy" in numerous race films throughout the 1930s and 1940s, and died in 1960.

Their daughter Edeve Thompson converted to Catholicism as a teenager. She later entered the Sisters of St. Francis of Oldenburg, Indiana, where she became known as Sister Francesca Thompson, O.S.F., and became an academic, teaching at both Marian University in Indiana and Fordham University in New York City.

== Filmography ==
- The Homesteader (1919)
- Within Our Gates (1920)
- The Brute (1920)
- The Gunsaulus Mystery (1921)
- Deceit (1923)
- Birthright (1924)
- The Devil's Disciple (1926)
- The Conjure Woman (1926)
- The Spider's Web (1926)
- The Framing of the Shrew (1928)
- Melancholy Dame (1928)
- Oft in the Silly Night (1928)
- The Lady Fare (1929)
- Brown Gravy (1929)
- The Widow's Bite (1929)
- Georgia Rose (1930)
- Good Sport (1931) uncredited
- Ladies of the Big House (1931)
- Blonde Venus (1932)

== Theater ==
- Rang Tang (1927), Royale Theatre, New York City
- The Noose (1928), Lincoln Theater, Los Angeles, California
