= Halley Harding =

American baseball player

- Shortstop
- Born: November 13, 1904; Wichita, Kansas, U.S.
- Died: April 1, 1967 (aged 62); Chicago, Illinois, U.S.
- Batted: Both Threw: Right

Negro league baseball debut
- 1926, for the Indianapolis ABCs

Last appearance
- 1937, for the Philadelphia Stars
- Stats at Baseball Reference

Teams
- Indianapolis ABCs (1926); Detroit Stars (1927–1928); Kansas City Monarchs (1928–1930); Baltimore Black Sox (1931); Chicago Columbia Giants (1931); Philadelphia Stars (1937)

William Claire Halley Harding (November 13, 1904 – April 1, 1967) was an American Negro league baseball shortstop from 1926 to 1937.

A native of Wichita, Kansas, Harding attended Knox College and Wilberforce University, where he was a standout football quarterback and punter. He played professional basketball for the Harlem Rens, and made his Negro league baseball debut in 1926 for the Indianapolis ABCs.

Following his baseball career, Harding worked as a sportswriter and editor for the Los Angeles Tribune and the Los Angeles Sentinel, and was a leading voice in advocating for the integration of the Los Angeles Rams and the National Football League. He died in Chicago, Illinois in 1967 at age 62.
