= Elliot Carpenter =

- Born: Elliot James Carpenter; December 28, 1894; Philadelphia, Pennsylvania, U.S.
- Died: February 12, 1982 (aged 87) Los Angeles, California, U.S.
- Genres: Classical, jazz, musical theatre
- Occupations: Musician, arranger, composer
- Instrument: Piano

Elliot James Carpenter (December 28, 1894 – February 12, 1982) was an American pianist, composer, arranger and writer.

== Biography ==
An African American, he was born in Philadelphia, and was educated at the Temple School of Music. He became a church organist, and at age 15 played piano in a performance of Mendelssohn's Concerto for piano and orchestra with the Philadelphia Concert Orchestra. He developed a love of popular music, moved to New York City where he was a member of the Clef Club, and became a pianist in James Reese Europe's orchestra.

In 1921, he travelled to Europe with Seth Weeks' orchestra, acted as accompanist to Maurice Chevalier, and also performed with Jim Europe's orchestra. He continued his music studies at Fontainebleau and under the pianist Albert Tadlewski in Nice. After returning to the U.S., he formed a vaudeville duo with singer Ike Hatch in 1925. They travelled to England, where they toured widely, performing in a jazz style as well as popular songs and classical arias, and made recordings for the Zonophone label. In 1930 he separated from Hatch to work as a solo performer, with an act called "Pianoisms" ranging from jazz to opera, and appeared in London nightclubs. He also formed a small band, the Red Devils, which at one point included drummer Dooley Wilson. They toured Europe, and Carpenter also performed as a piano soloist in London, Paris, Cannes, Cairo and Buenos Aires.

He returned to the United States in 1935, and soon afterwards settled in Los Angeles. He collaborated with Clarence Muse on music for the film Spirit of Youth starring boxer Joe Louis, and in 1939 arranged the music for The Swing Mikado, an adaptation of Gilbert and Sullivan's The Mikado. Carpenter featured as a musician with a speaking role in the 1940 film Broken Strings, which starred Muse. In 1942, he auditioned for the part in the film Casablanca that was eventually performed by Dooley Wilson. It was reported for several decades that, as Wilson was not a pianist, he mimed on-screen to the music played by Carpenter, although in recent years it has been suggested that the piano may instead have been played by studio musician Jean Vincent Plummer.

Carpenter remained active in Hollywood, and regularly performed at parties for movie stars, and on radio programs. He wrote several lengthy pieces, including "Moods", "African Dance", and "Bolero for Dance", and collaborated with Langston Hughes on a song, "America's Young Black Joe". His book, Syncopation, covered the lives and works of early African-American composers. He also made several recordings, released on the small Alpha, Monte Carlo and Tip Top labels. He continued to collaborate with Clarence Muse, as well as with many other musicians and composers in the Los Angeles area. Between the 1930s and 1970s he worked as a music teacher, and performed in many community and church events in the area.

Carpenter died in Los Angeles in 1982, aged 87.
