= Mr. Washington Goes to Town =

1942 film

- Theatrical poster
- Directed by: William Beaudine; Jed Buell
- Written by: Walter Weems; Lex Neal
- Produced by: Jed Buell; James K. Friedrich; Maceo Bruce Sheffield
- Starring: F. E. Miller; Mantan Moreland; Maceo Bruce Sheffield
- Cinematography: Jack Greenhalgh
- Edited by: William Faris
- Music by: Harvey Brooks
- Production company: Dixie National Pictures
- Distributed by: Dixie National Pictures
- Release date: May 9, 1942
- Running time: 64 minutes
- Country: United States
- Language: English
- Budget: $15,000

Mr. Washington Goes to Town is a 1942 American comedy film directed by William Beaudine and Jed Buell, and starring F. E. Miller, Mantan Moreland and Maceo Bruce Sheffield. The film was marketed primarily to black audiences and written and filmed in six days.

Later in 1942, the film's sequel Lucky Ghost was produced and released.

== Plot ==
While serving time in county prison, Wallingford reads a story in the newspaper saying that his cellmate Schenectady has inherited a mansion from his recently deceased uncle. Hearing this, Schenectady dreams of luxury.

== Cast ==
- F. E. Miller as Wallingford
- Mantan Moreland as Schenectady Jones
- Maceo Bruce Sheffield as Brutus Blake
- Marguerite Whitten as Lady Queenie
- Edward Boyd as Lonesome Ranger
- DeForest Covan as Short Man
- Nathan Curry as Policeman
- Cleo Desmond as Old Maid
- Slick Garrison as Man in Barber Chair
- Clarence Hargrave as Man with Gorilla
- Henry Hastings as Uncle Utica
- Charles Hawkins as Goldberg
- Monte Hawley as Stiletto
- John Lester Johnson as Tall Man
- Walter Knox as Man on Crutches
- Vernon McCalla as Invisible man
- Clarence Moorehouse as Gorilla
- Florence O'Brien as Chambermaid
- Arthur Ray as Blackstone
- Zerita Stepteau as Mrs. Brutus
- Johnnie Taylor as Magician
- Sam Warren as Barber
- Geraldine Whitfield as Young Girl

== Bibliography ==
- Marshall, Wendy L. William Beaudine: From Silents to Television. Scarecrow Press, 2005.
