= Broken Strings (film) =

1940 film by Bernard B. Ray

- Directed by: Bernard B. Ray
- Written by: Bernard B. Ray (story); Carl Krusada (adaptation); Carl Krusada (continuity); Clarence Muse (additional dialogue) and David Arlen (additional dialogue)
- Produced by: Lewie C. Borden (producer)
- Starring: See below
- Cinematography: Mack Stengler
- Edited by: Frederick Bain
- Music by: Elliot Carpenter
- Distributed by: International Road Shows, Inc.
- Release date: 1940
- Running time: 60 minutes
- Country: United States
- Language: English

Broken Strings is a 1940 American race film, directed by Bernard B. Ray and produced by L.C. Borden. It has been described as "the all-black version of The Jazz Singer".

== Plot summary ==
Concert violinist Arthur Williams and his manager Earl Wells are involved in a car accident in which Arthur's fingers are paralyzed. Instead of playing at concerts he becomes a music teacher. He favors his student Dickie Morley's classical musical preferences over his own son John's, which tends towards modern swing.

Williams' daughter Grace is romantically interested in a man named Gus, and they both work for the same company that makes hair products, which is owned by a James Stilton. Stilton's son, Sam, is attracted to Grace and is jealous of the attention she gives Gus. As a result, Sam refuses to give Grace an advance when she needs to pay for her father's appointment at a doctor that specializes in neurology, Dr. Charles Matson. The doctor promises Grace that she can pay the fee of $1,000 later, when her brother John has raised the money.

Sam goes on to frame Gus for something he did not do, and when Gus finds out, both he and Grace quit their jobs at the Stilton company. Fortunately, Johnny is a big success at the Miller Café when he is playing swing.

An angry Arthur chastises his son for playing such, in his view, awful music, and punishes him by making him play the violin until he faints. Soon after, Grace tells her father that Johnny only played at the club so that they could pay for the neurologist and support themselves since she is currently between jobs. Arthur feels guilt over how he treated his son.

Johnny and Grace go on to enter a music contest broadcast on the radio. At first it looks like their performance will be stopped when two strings on his violin, but then he gets the idea to play swing, since there are enough strings for that. The rest of the radio musicians all start playing the same way, and the performance is a success. When his son wins the contest, Arthur realizes his talent, and starts to regain sensitivity enough in his fingers to applause his son. Later it turns out that Dickie had sabotaged the violin before the contest, for which he apologizes. Arthur continues his career as a violinist.

== Cast ==
- Clarence Muse as Arthur Williams
- Sybil Lewis as Grace "Gracie" Williams
- William Washington as John "Johnny" Williams
- Tommie Moore as Mary
- Matthew "Stymie" Beard as Dickey Morley
- Pete Webster as Gus Herbert
- Edward Thompson as Sam Stilton
- Buck Woods as Fred Stilton
- Darby Jones as Stringbeans Johnson
- Jess Lee Brooks as Dr. Charles Matson
- Earle Morris as Earl Wells
- Elliot Carpenter as Musician

== Soundtrack ==
- The Stevens Sisters – "Kentucky Babe" (Music by Adam Geibel, lyrics by Richard Buck)
- Played by Tommie Moore on piano and William Washington on violin – "Humoresque in G-flat Major, Op. 101" (music by Antonín Dvořák)
