= Edward Thompson (actor) =

American actor

Edward Thompson (1898–1960) was an actor in the United States. He appeared in several films with African American casts. He worked on films with his wife Evelyn Preer, Spencer Williams, and other prominent African American actors including in Al Christie productions. He played in various theater productions as an actor, including in a musical dancing role in Darktown Follies.

He was born James Edward Thompson. He married fellow actor Evelyn Preer. Her second husband, they were both with the Lafayette Players in Chicago. They married February 4, 1924, in Williamson County, Tennessee, Tennessee (while in Nashville). The couple had a daughter in 1932.

Thompson starred in the 1929 Al Christie film Oft in the Silly Night, as Temus Robinson.

== Filmography ==
- The Spider's Web (1926) as Martinez
- The Melancholy Dame (1929) as Permanent Williams.
- Framing of the Shrew (1929) as Privacy Robson.
- Brown Gravy (1929)
- The Lady Fare (1929)
- Oft in the Silly Night (1929) as Temus Robinson
- The Widow's Bite (1929)
- Georgia Rose (1930) as Bob.
- Gangsters on the Loose (1937) as Police Lt. Lester.
- The Duke is Tops (1938) as Ferdie Fenton.
- Life Goes On (1938) as Bob Weston.
- While Thousands Cheer (1940) as Ransom, Coach Harding.
- Double Deal (1939) as Dude Markey
- Mystery in Swing (1940) as Capt. Hall.
- Broken Strings (1940) as Sam Stilton.
- Am I Guilty? (1940) Lawyer (as Eddie Thompson).
- Lady Luck (1942) as Second Ghost.
- Four Shall Die (1940) as Sgt. Adams.
