= Jess Lee Brooks =

American actor (1894–1944)

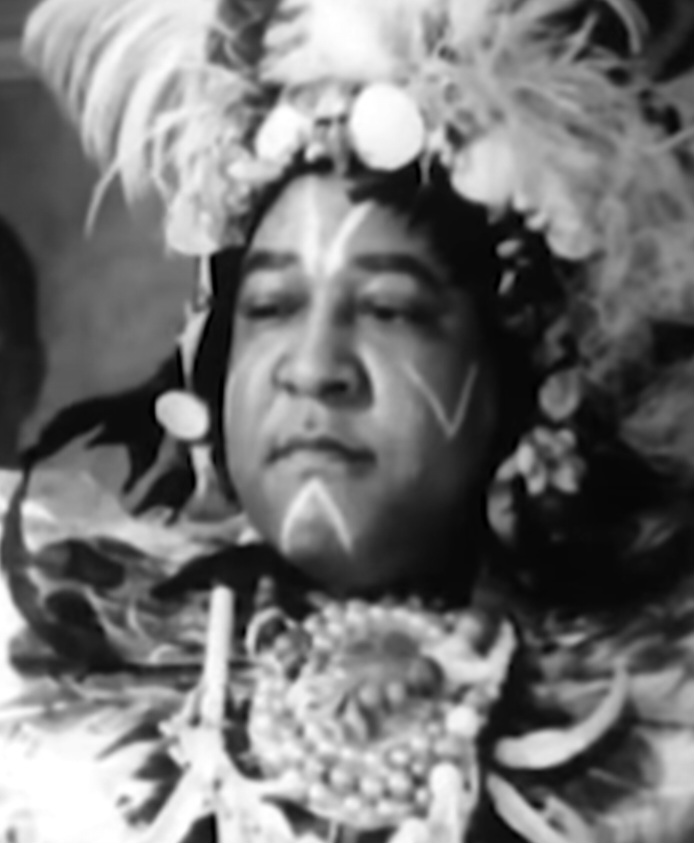
- Brooks in Jungle Siren (1942)
- Born: June 9, 1894; Jefferson, Texas, U.S.
- Died: December 12, 1944 (aged 50); Hollywood, Los Angeles, California, U.S.
- Resting place: Evergreen Cemetery
- Education: University of Kansas (BA); Northwestern University
- Occupations: Actor, singer
- Years active: 1930–1944
- Spouses: Rita Katherine Simpson (née Doran) (m. 1924–1937) Vesterée Lee Brooks (m. 1944)

Jess Lee Brooks (June 9, 1894 – December 12, 1944), also known as Jesse Brooks, was an American bass-baritone concert artist, and a film and stage actor. He played an African-American church preacher in the motion picture Sullivan's Travels, where he leads his congregation in singing "Go Down Moses".

== Early life and career ==
Born in Jefferson, Texas, and raised in Seattle, Brooks attended the University of Kansas and Northwestern University.

In March 1936, Brooks received glowing reviews for his portrayal of Haitian monarch Henri Christophe in the WPA production, Black Empire, which debuted at the Mayan Theater in Los Angeles. Two months later, the editorial page of Oklahoma's Black Dispatch featured scholar/activist William Pickens, giving the production and its star an unqualified thumbs up.

Look out, Broadway! Jess Brooks is a-coming. He is playing Christophe, king Henry the first of Haiti [...] The willpower of a black ruler trying to raise the estate of his ex-slave people is impressively portrayed. [...] It is no 'Emperor Jones' role; it is royally acted. Christophe was no fool and anything but a clown or a joker—and Brooks reproduces him.

Even Variety's Jack Hellman, in his otherwise lukewarm assessment of both play and production, singles out Brook's contribution.

Heavy dramatic fare too reminiscent of "Emperor Jones," but distinguished by a superb characterization by Jess Lee Brooks, one-time concert singer. Around his portrayal of the Black Napoleon the play takes its tempo. Once he's off stage, the piece lags. Opening night audience gave him five curtain calls, and deservedly so.

Exactly two weeks after Pickens' impassioned plug, New York's Amsterdam News reported that RKO Pictures had acquired the rights to ten short subjects scripted by George Randol, the first of which, Samson and Delilah, was to co-star Brooks and Edna Mae Harris, with music provided by William Grant Still and the Hall Johnson Choir. The film, later retitled That Man Samson, would not be released until May 28, 1937, almost two months after Brooks had completed work—cast as "a singing African prince"—on another musical comedy short, Zululand, (later retitled Little Pioneer), for his new employers, Warner Brothers-First National; the latter film reached the theaters about a month after Samson.

In the meantime, Brooks had long since made his screen debut portraying the police lieutenant in another George Randol project, the feature film Dark Manhattan, which had its lavish, "Hollywood style" world premiere on January 19, 1937, in the heart of L.A.'s Central Avenue Corridor.

== Personal life and death ==
From August 30, 1924 until at least 1937, Brooks was married to fellow concert artist, Rita Katherine Simpson (née Doran).

On Tuesday morning, December 12, 1944, Brooks suffered a fatal heart attack while en route to Paramount Studio, where he had a supporting role in The Lost Weekend. Police later found him slumped over the wheel of his parked car, at 326 North Van Ness Boulevard. NPB Hollywood correspondent Lawrence LaMar reported that the actor's widow, Vesterée, claimed that Brooks had had premonitions of his death for more than a week, and thus had made detailed plans, such as those regarding the undertaker to be employed and the manner of burial. His remains are interred at Evergreen Cemetery.

== Partial filmography ==
- Dark Manhattan (1937)
- That Man Samson (short) (1937) – Samson
- Little Pioneer (short) (1937) – Singing African prince
- Spirit of Youth (1938)
- Two-Gun Man from Harlem (1938)
- The Sun Never Sets (1939)
- Am I Guilty? (1940) – Dr. Fairchild (as Jesse Brooks)
- Four Shall Die (1940) – Bill Summers
- Sullivan's Travels (1941) – Black preacher (uncredited)
- Lucky Ghost (1942) – Door Man
- Jungle Siren (1942) – Chief Selangi
- Broken Strings (1942)
- Mr. & Mrs. North (1942) – Oscar
- Drums of the Congo (1942) – Chief Madjeduka
- Thank Your Lucky Stars (1943) – The Justice (uncredited)
- Girl Crazy (1943) – Bickets
- Wilson (1944) (uncredited) Simms, Georgia-born White House servant who welcomes ex-neighbor Ellen Wilson
- Son of Dracula (1943) (uncredited) – Steven
- The Lost Weekend (1945) – Hospital Patient (uncredited)
