= Octavus Roy Cohen =

American writer (1891–1959)

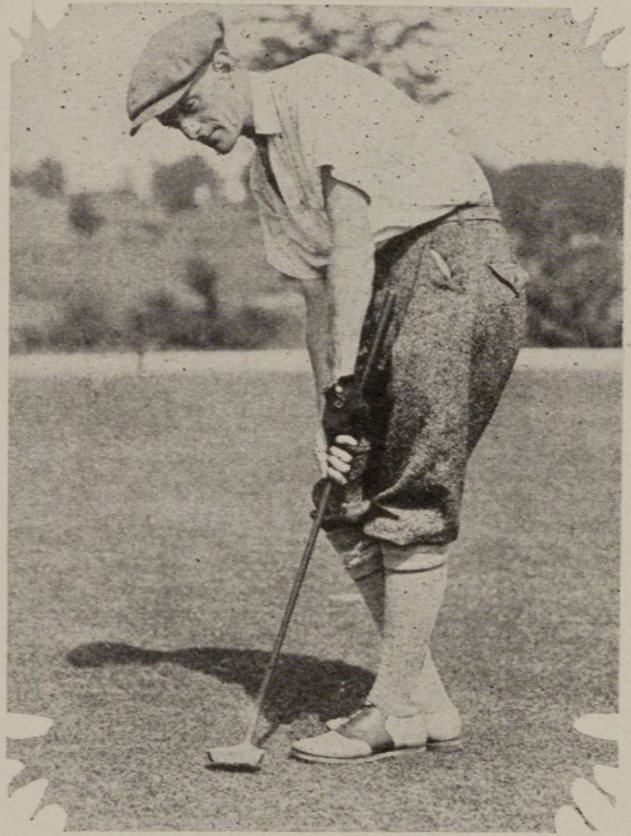
- Cohen at the East Lake Golf Club, 1925
- Born: June 26, 1891; Charleston, South Carolina, U.S.
- Died: January 6, 1959 (aged 67); Los Angeles, California, U.S.
- Resting place: Forest Lawn Memorial Park, Glendale, California, U.S.
- Education: Clemson College
- Occupations: Writer; actor
- Spouse: Inez Lopez (m. 1914; died 1953)
- Children: 1

Octavus Roy Cohen (1891–1959) was an early 20th-century American writer specializing in ethnic comedies. His dialect comedy stories about African Americans gained popularity after being published in the Saturday Evening Post and were adapted into a series of short films by Al Christie featuring actors Charles Olden, Spencer Williams Jr., Evelyn Preer, and Edward Thompson. His portrayals drew criticism from the likes of W. E. B. Du Bois, who complained about "the monstrosities he has created".

== Biography ==
=== Early life ===
Cohen was born on June 26, 1891, in Charleston, South Carolina, to Octavus and Rebecca Cohen (née Ottolengui). He pronounced his first name oc-tav'us, a as in have. Through his mother, he was the cousin of Rodrigues Ottolengui, who also wrote crime fiction.

He received his secondary education at the Porter Military Academy, now the Porter-Gaud School, and graduated in 1908. He went on to Clemson College (later renamed Clemson University) and graduated in 1911 with a degree in engineering.

=== Career ===
Between 1910 and 1912, he worked in the editorial departments of the Birmingham Ledger, the Charleston News and Courier, the Bayonne Times, and the Newark Morning Star.

He became popular as a result of his stories printed in The Saturday Evening Post which were about African-Americans. In 1913, he was admitted to the South Carolina bar and practiced law in Charleston for two years. Between 1917 and his death, he published 56 books, works that included humorous and detective novels, plays, and collections of short stories. He also composed successful Broadway plays and radio, film, and television scripts.

As a mark of his success, on March 20, 1923, Cohen bought the "Redin-Cohen" house, a Tudor Revival-style home in Birmingham, Alabama. He was known to host local writers and journalists to discuss fiction writing while in Birmingham.

He moved from Birmingham to Harlem, New York, in the late 1930s and then to Los Angeles to pursue a film career.

=== Personal life and death ===
He married Inez Lopez in October 1914 in Bessemer, Alabama. They had one son, Octavus Roy Cohen Jr.

His wife died in 1953. He died of a stroke on January 6, 1959, in Los Angeles and is buried at Forest Lawn Memorial Park in Glendale, California.

== Works ==
His most notable creation was "Florian Slappey", a fictional black detective who appeared both in print (in the Saturday Evening Post) and in a series of short films in the 1920s, These were "ethnic comedies" following the bumbling investigations of Slappey and his travels from Birmingham, Alabama, to Harlem, New York. They were later assembled into a stage play, Come Seven, with Slappey played by Earle Foxe, which ran for 72 performances. A second detective stage play, The Crimson Alibi, featured a white detective, David Carroll.

He wrote:

- Polished Ebony (1919)
- Gray Dusk (1920)
- Come Seven (1920)
- Highly Colored (1921)
- Midnight (1922)

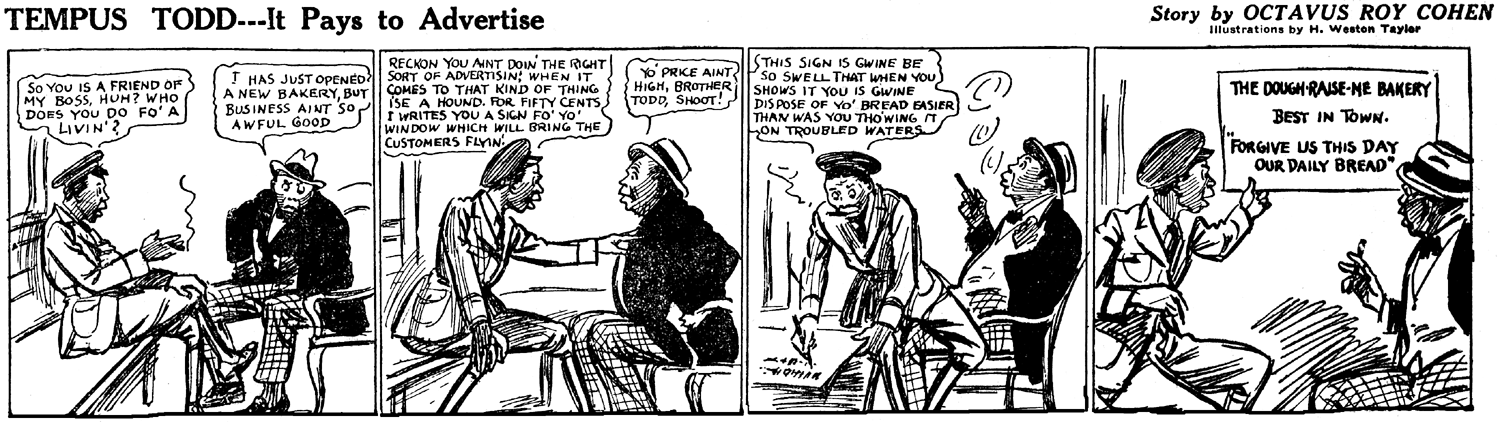
Installment of the short-lived comic strip Tempus Todd, which ran from April to September 1923. Here, Tempus and a bakery owner talk about advertising.

Cohen wrote several novels about detective David Carroll. One of these novels, The Crimson Alibi, was adapted for the stage by George Broadhurst. Cohen's character of Jim Hanvey, "a sort of backwoods Nero Wolfe", "one of the earliest private eyes", appeared in two films; Curtain at Eight (1933), based on his novel The Backstage Mystery, and Jim Hanvey, Detective (1937), based on his original story. "Hanvey made most of his appearances in short stories in The Saturday Evening Post, where much of... Cohen's other work was also published... Cohen created a few other detectives... one of the first black private eyes, Florian Slappey, although they're more famous now for their unflattering portrayal of blacks than their historical significance."

Jim Hanvey books by Cohen:

- Jim Hanvey, Detective (1923, short stories)
- Detours (1927, short stories, one featuring Hanvey)
- The May Day Mystery (1929)
- The Backstage Mystery (also published as Curtain at Eight) (1930)
- Star of Earth (1932)
- Scrambled Yeggs (1934, short stories)

=== Films ===
- The Lady Fare is a 1929 American comedy film adapted from a Cohen story.

Cohen was scriptwriter (or co-scriptwriter with Alfred A. Cohen) for six known films:

- The Eyes of Mystery (1918) directed by Tod Browning
- Melancholy Dame (1929) directed by Arvid Gillstrom, Florian Slappey played by Charles Olden
- Hot Biscuits
- The Widow's Bite
- Oft in the Silly Night
- Music Hath Harms (1929) directed by Walter Graham, Florian Slappey played by Harry Tracy
- The Framing of the Shrew (1929) directed by Arvid Gillstrom, Florian Slappey played by Charles Olden
- Transient Lady (1935) directed by Edward Buzzell
- They Met in a Taxi (1936) directed by Alfred E. Green
