= Corpus Earthling =

- The Outer Limits episode
- Episode no.: Season 1 Episode 9
- Directed by: Gerd Oswald
- Story by: Louis Charbonneau
- Teleplay by: Orin Borsten
- Cinematography by: Conrad Hall
- Production code: 16
- Original air date: November 18, 1963

Guest appearances
- Dr. Paul Cameron: Robert Culp; Laurie Cameron:Salome Jens; Dr. Jonas Temple: Barry Atwater (credited at G.B. Atwater)

Episode chronology
← Previous "The Human Factor"	Next → "Nightmare"

"Corpus Earthling" is an episode of the original The Outer Limits television show. It first aired on November 18, 1963, during the first season.

== Opening narration ==
Rocks: silent, inanimate objects torn from the Earth's ancient crust. Yielding up to man over the long centuries all that is known of the planet on which we live withholding from man forever their veiled secrets of the nature of matter and cosmic catastrophe, the secrets of other worlds in the vastness of the universe, of other forms of life, of strange organisms beyond the imagination of man.

== Plot ==
Intelligent, parasitic extraterrestrials that resemble Terran rocks, intent on enslaving the human race, find a hideout in geologist Dr. Jonas Temple's (Barry Atwater) lab. Although undetected by ordinary humans, physician Dr. Paul Cameron, who has a surgically implanted metal plate in his skull, is able to "hear" the alien "rocks" communicate with each other. Aware that he can hear them (while referring to Paul as "the listener"), they realize he is a threat, and compel him to kill himself by jumping from the lab window. At the last moment he is saved when his wife, Laurie, Dr. Temple's assistant, returns to the lab, breaking the aliens' mind control.

Thinking he is going insane, Paul takes an impulsive vacation to Mexico with Laurie to help clear his troubled mind. Dr. Temple, now controlled by one of the "rocks" after it enters his body, pursues them.

In Mexico, Laurie becomes possessed after Dr. Temple finds her alone in the remote desert cabin that she and Paul had rented, and is commanded by the aliens to possess her husband upon his return. Fighting for his life, Paul is forced to stab Temple, and shoot Laurie (though it is not clear that she dies), forcing the aliens to evacuate the bodies they inhabited, thus showing their true form –hideous, shiny-black, crab-like beings with two glowing eyes. He then starts a fire inside the cabin, where the aliens are presumably destroyed, while carrying Laurie's seemingly lifeless body away from the blaze.

== Closing narration ==
Two black crystalline rocks: unclassifiable. Objects on the border between the living and the nonliving. A reminder of the thin line that separates the animate from the inanimate. Something to ponder on. Something to stay the hand when it reaches out innocently for the whitened pebble, the veined stone, the dead unmoving rocks of our planet.

== Background ==
Adapted from Louis Charbonneau's novel Corpus Earthling, first published by Zenith Books in 1960. In the novel, Paul is an unmarried university instructor with amorous desires for Laurie, one of his students. He is a latent telepath who has been compelled, on at least three occasions, toward suicide by an alien force that calls him "the listener". The invaders were brought to Earth with the first geological samples from Mars (the story is set post 1990). Dr Temple, who diagnoses Paul as schizophrenic after he reveals he hears voices, is the first to be possessed when he touches the alien rocks with his tongue. At the end, after killing the aliens, Paul finds a telepathic girlfriend.

This was the second of three episodes to star Robert Culp (the other two were "The Architects of Fear" written by Meyer Dolinsky and "Demon with a Glass Hand" by Harlan Ellison). Culp indicated that of the three episodes, he felt the "talking rocks" episode was the one he liked least of The Outer Limits episodes he shot.

== Original air date ==
The original air date for the episode was four days prior to the assassination of President John F. Kennedy. The following episode, "Nightmare", would be delayed an extra week and would air on December 2, 1963.

== Cast ==
- Robert Culp – as Dr. Paul Cameron
- Salome Jens – as Laurie Cameron
- Barry Atwater – as Dr. Jonas Temple
- David Garner – as Ralph
- Ken Renard – as Caretaker
- Robert Johnson – as voice of Alien Rocks (uncredited)
