= A Name for Evil =

1973 film by Bernard Girard

- Directed by: Bernard Girard
- Written by: Bernard Girard
- Based on: A Name for Evil by Andrew Lytle
- Produced by: Reed Sherman
- Starring: Robert Culp; Samantha Eggar
- Cinematography: Reginald Morris
- Edited by: Maurice Wright
- Music by: Dominic Frontiere
- Production company: Penthouse Pictures
- Distributed by: Cinerama Releasing Corporation
- Release date: February 28, 1973 (San Francisco)
- Running time: 74 minutes
- Country: United States
- Language: English
- Budget: $1 million

A Name for Evil is a 1973 American horror film directed by Bernard Girard and starring Robert Culp and Samantha Eggar. An adaptation of the 1947 novel of the same name by Andrew Nelson Lytle, the film follows a man and his wife who relocate to his great-grandfather's country estate only to find themselves plagued by strange occurrences.

The film was originally intended by director Girard to be a psychological drama with supernatural elements, as well as a satire on contemporary affluence. Principal photography took place in Vancouver, British Columbia in late 1970. The film had a troubled production marked by funding issues that resulted in Metro-Goldwyn-Mayer dropping the project for distribution, and its stars Culp and Eggar suing the investors for ownership of the finished film.

Bob Guccione, founder of Penthouse magazine, eventually acquired rights to the film, after which reshoots occurred and it was significantly re-edited. Cinerama Releasing Corporation released the film in February 1973, premiering it in San Francisco, California.

== Cast ==
- Robert Culp as John Blake
- Samantha Eggar as Joanna Blake
- Sheila Sullivan as Luanna Baxter
- Mike Lane as Fats
- Sue Hathaway as Mary
- Ted Greenhalgh as Hugh

== Production ==
=== Development ===
A Name for Evil was adapted from the 1947 novel of the same name by Andrew Lytle. Producer Carl Hittleman had originally purchased rights to Lytle's novel in 1965 and planned to develop the film with Reed Sherman, who would co-star and produce. In 1966, it was reported that Art Weingarten had been appointed to write the screenplay. Sherman is credited on the film as a producer, though the extent of his involvement is unknown.

The film's original working title was The Grove. It was originally intended by director Bernard Girard to be a psychological drama and satire on modern affluence with elements of "paranormal paranoia."

Patrick O'Neal was originally cast in the lead role of John Blake, though the part was later re-cast with Robert Culp.

=== Filming ===
Principal photography took place in and around Vancouver, British Columbia, beginning on July 6, 1970, and was completed by the fall of that year. Portions of the film were shot in Deep Cove, while the house location was the historic Wigwam Inn.

== Release ==
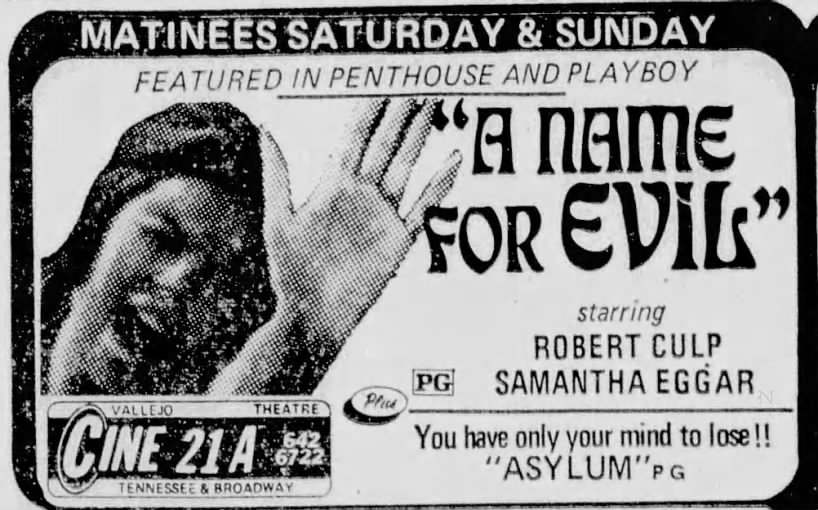
Newspaper advertisement in The Times-Herald, 1973

A Name for Evil was originally slated to be released by Metro-Goldwyn-Mayer, but the film was dropped by the studio following legal injunctions by its stars Culp and Eggar, who were not paid their promised salaries after the production ran out of funding. Eggar and Culp sued the project's investors, producers, and processing lab, seeking ownership of the finished film as compensation.

Bob Guccione, the founder of Penthouse magazine, had ventured into the film business in the early 1970s, and purchased the rights to the film. Under Guccione's supervision, reshoots occurred and the film was re-cut into what critic Marc Edward Heuck describes as "a baffling horror film that played the bottom of double bills." Girard's original cut ran approximately 84 minutes, though the version that was officially released ran only 74 minutes in length.

Cinerama Releasing Corporation distributed the film over two years after its completion, with advertisements running in Penthouse magazine to promote the film. It opened in the San Francisco Bay Area on February 28, 1973, before premiering in Los Angeles at the Baldwin Theater on April 4, 1973.

The 84-minute cut of the film was exhibited at a revival screening at the New Beverly Cinema in April 2017.

=== Home media ===
A Name for Evil was released on VHS in the U.S. by Paragon Video Productions in the 1984. Diamond Entertainment later issued a DVD edition in 2004.

== Reception ==
Anitra Earle of the San Francisco Chronicle panned the film as "outlandish... A Name for Evil is such an eclectic mess that it's interesting, in a way, if you have that kind of morbid taste in films that you enjoy wondering whatever made a director decide to do what he did." Earle did, however, praise the film's cinematography as "fresh and imaginative." The Arizona Republic's Phil Strasberg panned the film, writing that Culp and Eggar "are totally wasted in a ridiculous tale."

== See also ==
- List of American films of 1973
