= Beverly Long (actress) =

American actress (1933–2014)

- Long in The Green-Eyed Blonde (1957)
- Born: Beverly Powell Long; April 18, 1933; Manila, Philippines
- Died: May 8, 2014 (aged 81); Los Angeles, California, United States
- Education: Grossmont High School, 1950
- Occupation: Actress
- Years active: 1952–2009

Beverly Powell Long (April 18, 1933 – May 8, 2014) was an American film and television actress. Her credits include Rebel Without a Cause (1955), The Green-Eyed Blonde (1957), and Father Knows Best (1958–1960). She later worked as a casting director with her own company Beverly Long Casting.

== Biography ==
Beverly Powell Long was born in Manila, the Philippines, on April 18, 1933. Her father Roe was a submarine engineer for the U.S. Navy stationed at nearby Subic Bay Naval Base. Her family, including mother Thelma and older sister Dorothe, moved back to the US when she was a child and she grew up in La Mesa, California, a few miles east of San Diego. She graduated from Grossmont High School in June 1950 and began acting at San Diego's Globe Theatre, where she won a scholarship to the Geller Theatre Workshop in Los Angeles.

At 17 she moved into the Hollywood Studio Club, a residence for young women in the film industry where such actress hopefuls as Marilyn Monroe and Kim Novak were among her fellow residents.

Director Mabel Albertson cast her for the title role in a new play at the Players Ring Theatre, Susan Slept Here by Steve Fisher and Alex Gottlieb. The production launched Long's career. On television she became a series regular on "The Ruggles" and "Those Whiting Girls" and she did several guest spots on Father Knows Best as Betty's best friend Judy.

Among her minor credits, she filmed a Pepsi commercial with James Dean in 1950.

In early 1955 director Nicholas Ray cast Long as a member of the high school gang in Rebel Without a Cause, a groundbreaking, troubled-teens movie starring James Dean that was voted for inclusion in the Library of Congress National Film Registry in 1990. On the set she was one of several young cast members who explained gang behaviour to Ray. Many of her lines, originally in French to demonstrate her character's pretensions, were cut.

In January 1957 she appeared in an episode of DuPont Cavalcade Theatre on ABC. Long co-starred in Warner Bros.' The Green-Eyed Blonde in 1957 and in As Young as We Are for Paramount Pictures in 1958.

She was married to Robert Dorff from 1955 to 1971. She retired from acting in 1958 to start a family. She had two sons and a daughter. She married John Crawford in 1976; the marriage ended in divorce.

Beverly returned to show business in the early 1970s, first as a talent agent and later as a casting director. She founded Beverly Long & Associates in the 1980s and won numerous awards for her casting, including a Clio. Her casting credits include the films Swap Meet (1979) and When a Stranger Calls (1979), and a wide variety of commercial clients, including Hallmark Cards, Kraft Mayonnaise, Mars Bars, and United Airlines.

As late as 2000 she participated in reunions to celebrate Rebel Without a Cause.

Long retired in 2004 and lived in Studio City. She died after a brief hospital stay on May 8, 2014, and was buried in Forest Lawn Memorial Park.

== Filmography ==
Year	Title	Role	Notes
1953	Girls in the Night	Mary	Uncredited
1955	Rebel Without a Cause	Helen	
1957	Cavalcade of America	Dilly	1 episode
1957	The Green-Eyed Blonde	Ouisie	
1958	As Young as We Are	Marge	
2009	Super Capers	Marge	(final film role)
