= Robert Harland =

American film, stage and television actor (1935–2023)

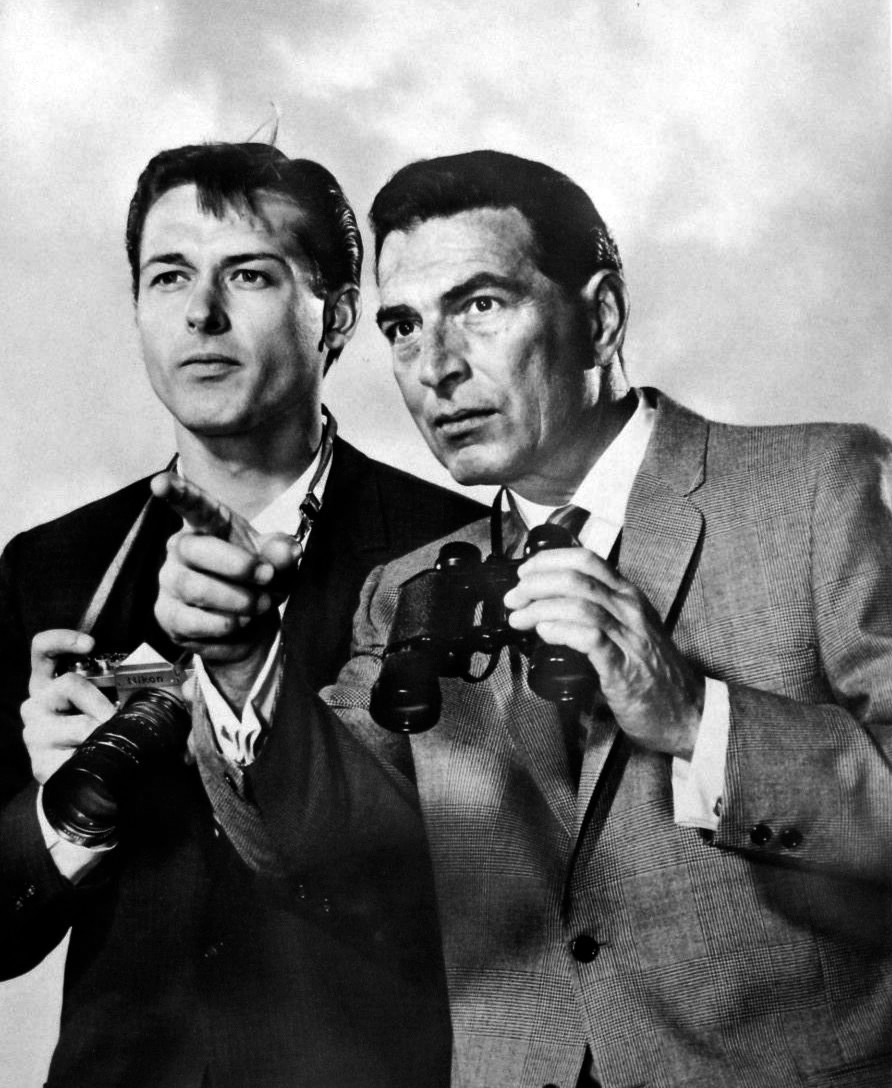
- Harland (left) with Stephen McNally in Target: The Corruptors!, 1961
- Born: Robert John Yurgatis; February 28, 1935; Chester, Pennsylvania, U.S.
- Died: December 21, 2023 (aged 88); Gloucester City, New Jersey, U.S.
- Occupations: Film, stage and television actor

Robert John Yurgatis (February 28, 1935 – December 21, 2023), was an American film, stage and television actor. He was best known for playing Jack Flood in the American crime drama television series Target: The Corruptors!.

== Life and career ==
Harland was born in Chester, Pennsylvania. He attended St. James High School for Boys, graduating in 1953. After graduating, he attended Columbia School of Broadcasting in Philadelphia, Pennsylvania, before working as a disc jockey and radio announcer in Wilmington, Delaware. He then studied at the American Academy of Dramatic Arts in Manhattan, New York, living in Greenwich Village, New York, and taking roles in the academy's stage productions.

In 1957, Harland played the lead role in a production of Bus Stop at the Robin Hood Playhouse in Arden, Delaware. He used the stage name Harland. He began his screen career in 1958, starring as Hank Moore in the film As Young as We Are, starring along with Pippa Scott. In the same year, he made his television debut in the syndicated anthology television series The Silent Service. In 1960, he played the recurring role of Deputy Billy Lordan in the NBC western television series Law of the Plainsman.

Later in his career, in 1961, Harland starred as Jack Flood in the ABC crime drama television series Target: The Corruptors!, starring along with Stephen McNally. After the series ended in 1962, he played the recurring role of Sgt. Older in the ABC police procedural television series The Rookies, and the recurring role of Colorado gubernatorial candidate James Rayford in the eighth season of the ABC soap opera television series Dynasty. He guest-starred in television programs including three episodes of Perry Mason, Outlaws, Petticoat Junction, Ben Casey, The Life and Legend of Wyatt Earp, Wagon Train, The Millionaire and Zane Grey Theatre.

Harland retired from acting in 1997, last appearing in the film The Rest of My Life.

== Death ==
Harland died on December 21, 2023, in Gloucester City, New Jersey, at the age of 88.
