= Bernard Girard =

American writer, producer, and director

- Born: Bernard Goldstein; February 22, 1918; Vallejo, California, United States
- Died: December 30, 1997 (aged 79); Woodland Hills, Los Angeles, California, United States
- Occupations: Writer, Producer, Director
- Years active: 1948 - 1975 (film)

Bernard Girard (February 22, 1918 – December 30, 1997) was an American screenwriter, producer and film director.

== Life and career ==
Bernard Girard was born as Bernard Goldstein in Solano County, California. A native of Vallejo, Girard served in the United States Army Air Forces during World War II. He was nominated for an Emmy at the 9th Primetime Emmy Awards for Best Public Service Series (You Are There). He directed the premier episode of the renowned 1955 television series Medic “White is the Color”. Girard died December 30, 1997, at age 79. Girard is survived by his wife, Linda, and three sons.

Girard's filmmaking career had a number of ups and downs. He was the original director on What Ever Happened to Aunt Alice? (1969), but producer Robert Aldrich replaced him with Lee H. Katzin. In 1979, Girard shot a movie starring the rock band The Runaways with Joan Jett called "We're All Crazy Now," which was unfinished when Jett became ill. The film was later completed, actually butchered, by director Alan Sacks, and released in 1980 as Du-beat-e-o.

== Selected filmography ==
- As You Were (1951)
- This Woman Is Dangerous (1952)
- Ride Out for Revenge (1957)
- The Green-Eyed Blonde (1957)
- As Young as We Are (1958)
- The Rebel Set (1959)
- Dead Heat on a Merry-Go-Round (1966)
- The Mad Room (1969)
- The Happiness Cage (1972)
- A Name for Evil (1973)
- Gone with the West (1975)
- We're All Crazy Now (1979) recut as Du-beat-e-o(1984)

== Bibliography ==
- Packer, Sharon. Neuroscience in Science Fiction Films. McFarland, 2014.
