= Ken Renard =

Actor

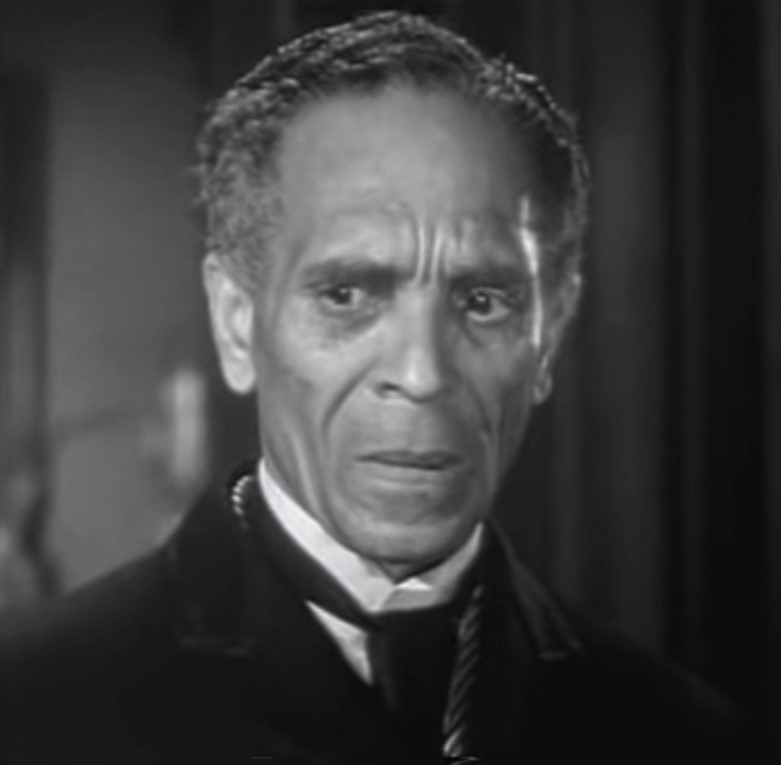
- Renard in The Return of Andrew Bentley, a 1961 episode of Thriller
- Born: Kenneth Fitzroy Renwick; 19 November 1905; Port of Spain, Trinidad
- Died: 16 November 1993 (aged 87); Los Angeles County, California, U.S.
- Occupation: Actor

Ken Renard (19 Novemnber 1905 – 16 November 1993) was an actor in the United States. He had roles in Strange Fruit on stage in 1945, the film True Grit (1969) and the television series Robert Montgomery Presents (1950–1957). He was born on November 19, 1905, in Port of Spain, Trinidad as Kenneth Fitzroy Renwick. He died on November 16, 1993, in Los Angeles County, California.

He portrayed Toussaint Louverture in the film Lydia Bailey. He appeared on the television show The Name of the Game (1968).

== Filmography ==
=== Film ===
- Sugar Hill Baby (1932? 1938?)
- Murder with Music (1941) as Bill Smith, using parts of the film Mistaken Identity
- Killer Diller (1948) as The Great Voodoo
- Lydia Bailey (1952) as Toussaint L'Ouverture (uncredited)
- Something of Value (1957) as Karanja, father of Kimani
- These Thousand Hills (1959) as Happy, the waiter (uncredited)
- Home From the Hill (1960) as Chauncey (Hunnicutt butler)
- Papa's Delicate Condition (1963) as Walter
- The Chase (1966) as Sam
- True Grit (1969) as Yarnell
- Double Indemnity (1973, TV Movie) as Porter
- Sparkle (1976) as Shimmy Dodson
- Treasure of Matecumbe (1976) as Customer
- The Farmer (1977) as Gumshoe
- Exorcist II: The Heretic (1977) as Abbot
- Pete's Dragon (1977) as African-American Townsman (uncredited)

=== Television ===
- The Posthumous Dead (1950)
- Thriller (1961) as Jacob Blount
- Sam Benedict (1962, Episode: "Maddon's Folly") as Bentley Coombs
- The Outer Limits (1963, Episode: "Corpus Earthling") as Caretaker
- The Virginian (1968, S8 E12: "Nora") as Grey Feather
- The Name of the Game (1968, Episode: "Ordeal") as William
- Gunsmoke (1975, Episode: "I Have Promises to Keep") as Tonkowa

Mannix The Huntdown 1967 Television
