= As Young as We Are =

1958 film

- Theatrical release poster
- Directed by: Bernard Girard
- Screenplay by: Meyer Dolinsky
- Story by: Meyer Dolinsky; William Alland
- Produced by: William Alland
- Starring: Robert Harland; Pippa Scott; Majel Barrett; Ty Hardin; Barry Atwater; Carla Hoffman
- Cinematography: Haskell B. Boggs
- Edited by: Everett Douglas
- Production company: Paramount Pictures
- Distributed by: Paramount Pictures
- Release date: September 1958
- Running time: 76 minutes
- Country: United States
- Language: English

As Young as We Are is a 1958 American drama film directed by Bernard Girard and written by Meyer Dolinsky. The film stars Robert Harland, Pippa Scott, Majel Barrett, Ty Hardin, Barry Atwater and Carla Hoffman. The film was released in September 1958, by Paramount Pictures.

== Plot ==
Kim Hutchins (Scott) and Joyce Goodwin (Barrett) are hired by Principal Paul Evans (Dyrenforth) reluctantly because they have no experience. When driving, Hutchins and Goodwin's car breaks down. A man (Harland) comes along to help them. Hutchins is attracted to the young man, but shocked when she finds he is one of her students. The student falls in love with Hutchins and kidnaps her. On their way to Las Vegas to get married, an accident happens. After everything is cleared up, Hutchins is allowed to teach again.

== Cast ==
- Robert Harland as Hank Moore
- Pippa Scott as Kim Hutchins
- Majel Barrett as Joyce Goodwin
- Ty Hardin as Roy Nielson
- Barry Atwater as Mr. Peterson
- Carla Hoffman as Nina
- Ellen Corby as Nettie McPherson
- Harold Dyrenforth as Mr. Paul Evans
- Ross Elliott as Bob
- Linda Watkins as Mrs. Hutchins
- Beverly Long as Marge
- Mack Williams as Doctor Alan Hutchins
