= Jigsaw John (TV series) =

Television series

- Genre: Crime drama
- Created by: Al Martinez
- Developed by: Robert Monroe; Everett Chambers
- Starring: Jack Warden; Pippa Scott; Alan Feinstein (actor)
- Theme music composer: Pete Rugolo
- Composers: Jack Urbont; Pete Rugolo
- Country of origin: United States
- Original language: English
- No. of seasons: 1
- No. of episodes: 15

Production
- Running time: 60 minutes
- Production company: MGM Television

Original release
- Network: NBC
- Release: February 2 – June 14, 1976

Jigsaw John is an American crime drama television series that aired on NBC from February 2 until June 14, 1976, based on the career of real-life Los Angeles Police Department (LAPD) robbery-homicide Detective "Jigsaw John" St. John. It was preceded, during the previous television season, by the TV movie They Only Come Out at Night.

== Premise ==
John St. John is an LAPD detective who solves murder cases.

== Cast ==
- Jack Warden as "Jigsaw" John St. John
- Alan Feinstein as Sam Donner
- Pippa Scott as Maggie Hearn

== Episodes ==
No.	Title	Directed by	Written by	Original release date
1	"Promise to Kill"	Harry Falk	James D. Buchanan and Arthur Rowe	February 2, 1976
John is targeted by an ex-con he sent to prison 11 years earlier.
2	"Sand Trap"	Fernando Lamas	Charles Larson	February 9, 1976
The skeleton of a woman from a case that closed 11 years ago is discovered.
3	"Too Much, Too Soon Blues"	Allen Reisner	Michael Wagner	February 16, 1976
"Jigsaw" investigates the murder of a rock star.
4	"Thicker Than Blood"	Harry Falk	Thom Cost Quintero	February 23, 1976
Two brothers are set to inherit a fortune. When one of them is murdered, the other one becomes a prime suspect.
5	"Dry Ice"	Paul Krasny	Brad Radnitz & James G. Hirsch	March 1, 1976
A security guard is killed during the robbery of a hotel.
6	"Follow the Yellow Brick Road"	Reza Badiyi	John D. F. Black	March 8, 1976
An aspiring actress is murdered.
7	"The Mourning Line"	Reza Badiyi	Ronald Austin & James D. Buchannon	March 15, 1976
An executive becomes a suspect when a bookie is murdered and John trains a new partner.
8	"The Death of the Party"	Charles S. Dubin	Al Martinez & James D. Buchanan	March 22, 1976
John investigates an apartment complex when a young woman is killed.
9	"Eclipse"	Jerry Jameson	Orville H. Hampton & James D. Buchanan	March 29, 1976
10	"The Executioner"	Reza Badiyi	James G. Hirsch	April 5, 1976
John investigates the death of a criminology professor who was responsible for a study program for prisoners.
11	"Runaway"	David Moessinger	Bud Freeman	April 12, 1976
An emotionally unstable teenager is the only witness to the murder of a missing woman.
12	"Plastique"	Reza Badiyi	Glen Olson & Rod Baker	April 19, 1976
A security-systems executive is threatened to be killed.
13	"Homicide is a Fine Art"	Reza Badiyi	Story by : Shimon Wincelberg; Teleplay by : Ronald Austin & James D. Buchanan and James G. Hirsch	May 31, 1976
"Jigsaw" investigates the murder of a well-liked Texan.
14	"Ole-Ole An Free"	Unknown	James D. Buchanan	June 7, 1976
John poses as an alcoholic when he investigates a nursing home.
15	"Homicide 96403: John Smith"	Bud Wiser	Robert Specht	June 14, 1976
A woman disappears when her boyfriend is murdered.
