= The Green-Eyed Blonde =

1957 film

- Theatrical release poster
- Directed by: Bernard Girard
- Written by: Sally Stubblefield (Credited); Dalton Trumbo
- Produced by: Martin Melcher
- Starring: Susan Oliver; Melinda Plowman; Beverly Long; Norma Jean Nilsson; Tommie Moore; Carla Merey
- Cinematography: Eddie Fitzgerald
- Edited by: Thomas Reilly
- Music by: Leith Stevens
- Production company: Arwin Productions
- Distributed by: Warner Bros. Pictures
- Release date: December 14, 1957
- Running time: 76 minutes
- Country: United States
- Language: English

The Green-Eyed Blonde is a 1957 American drama film directed by Bernard Girard and written in collaboration by Dalton Trumbo, a blacklisted Hollywood screenwriter; and his front Sally Stubblefield, who wrote the story that Trumbo then adapted for the screen. The film stars Susan Oliver, Melinda Plowman, Beverly Long, Norma Jean Nilsson, Tommie Moore and Carla Merey. The film was released by Warner Bros. Pictures on December 14, 1957.

== Plot ==
Maggie Wilson joins the staff of a California institution for wayward girls, run by the stern Mrs. Nichols. A new arrival, Betsy Abel, hates her mother and has a two-month-old baby of her own, refusing to identify the father.

"Greeneyes", one of the girls, is due to be released in a few weeks. Her boyfriend Cliff is a former drug addict, determined to stay clean. The girls at the institution bond, particularly when Betsy's mother visits, threatening to put the baby up for adoption unless Betsy names the father so he can pay for the baby's support. The mother is unaware her own boyfriend impregnated her daughter.

Betsy's mother has brought the baby to the school during her visit and has left it in the car. One of the girls takes the child and all the girls in the school band together to care for it in secret. They keep the baby hidden for 10 days, but Maggie finally finds the baby and agrees to let them keep it through Christmas, only three days away. The next day, however, on Maggie's day off, the baby is discovered by Mrs. Nichols, who has it taken away. As the baby is driven off to an orphanage, the girls start a full-scale riot and destroy the school. Greeneyes is given a six-month extension to her sentence, against Maggie's recommendation. Greeneyes escapes, but she and Cliff rob a store and, when they are chased by police, they are killed.

== Cast ==
- Susan Oliver as Phyllis "Greeneyes"
- Melinda Plowman as Betsy Abel
- Beverly Long as Ouisie
- Norma Jean Nilsson as Cuckoo
- Tommie Moore as Trixie Budlong
- Carla Merey as Joyce
- Sally Brophy as Margaret Wilson
- Jean Inness as Mrs. Nichols
- Olive Blakeney as Miss Vandingham
- Juanita Moore as Miss Randall
