= Robert Culp =

American actor (1930–2010)

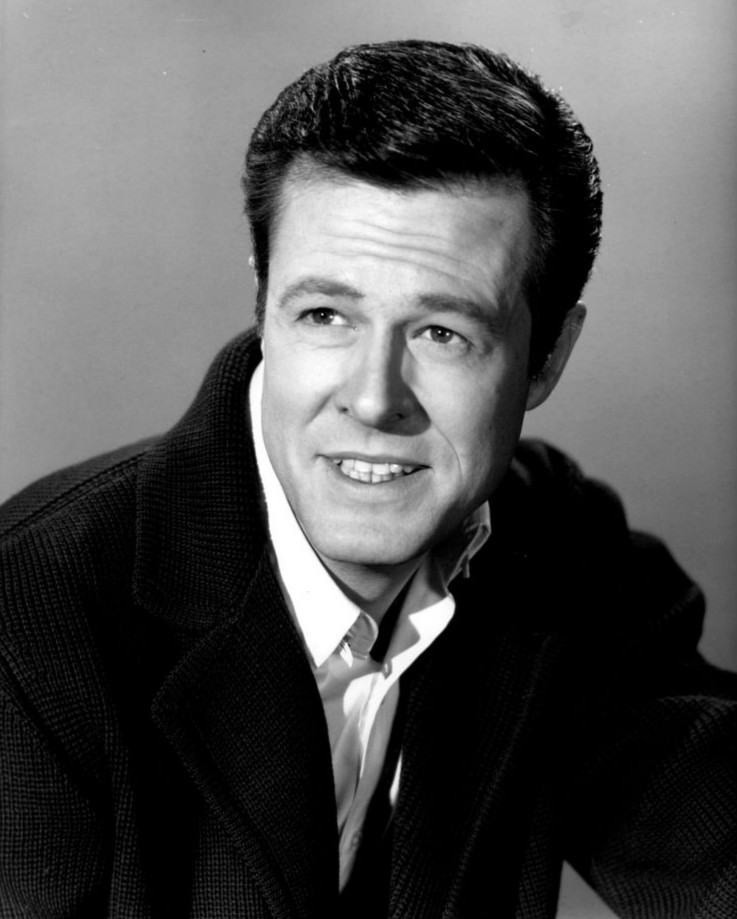
- Culp in a publicity photo in 1965
- Born: Robert Martin Culp; August 16, 1930; Oakland, California, U.S.
- Died: March 24, 2010 (aged 79); Los Angeles, California, U.S.
- Resting place: Sunset View Cemetery, El Cerrito, California
- Education: University of the Pacific; Washington University in St. Louis; San Francisco State University; University of Washington School of Drama
- Occupations: Actor; screenwriter
- Years active: 1953–2010
- Spouses: Elayne Carroll (m. 1951; div. 1956); Nancy Wilner (m. 1957; div. 1966); France Nuyen (m. 1967; div. 1970); Sheila Sullivan (m. 1971; div. 1976); Candace Faulkner (m. 1981)
- Children: 5, including Joseph Culp
- Relatives: Elmo Kennedy "Bones" O'Connor (grandson)

Robert Martin Culp (August 16, 1930 – March 24, 2010) was an American actor and screenwriter widely known for his work in television. Culp earned an international reputation for his role as Kelly Robinson on I Spy (1965–1968), the espionage television series in which he and co-star Bill Cosby played secret agents. Before this, he starred in the CBS/Four Star Western series Trackdown as Texas Ranger Hoby Gilman in 71 episodes from 1957 to 1959. The 1980s brought him back to television as FBI Agent Bill Maxwell on The Greatest American Hero. Later, he had a recurring role as Warren Whelan on Everybody Loves Raymond, and was a voice actor for various video games, including Half-Life 2. Culp gave hundreds of performances in a career spanning more than 50 years.

== Early life and education ==
Culp was born on August 16, 1930, in either Oakland, California, or Berkeley, California. He was the only child of Crozier Cordell Culp, an attorney, and his wife, Bethel Martin Culp (née Collins). He graduated from Berkeley High School, where he was a pole vaulter and took second place at the 1947 CIF California State Meet.

Culp attended the University of the Pacific in Stockton, California, and later Washington University in St. Louis, San Francisco State, and the University of Washington School of Drama, but never completed an academic degree. He also received acting training at HB Studio in New York City.

== Career ==
=== Television performances ===
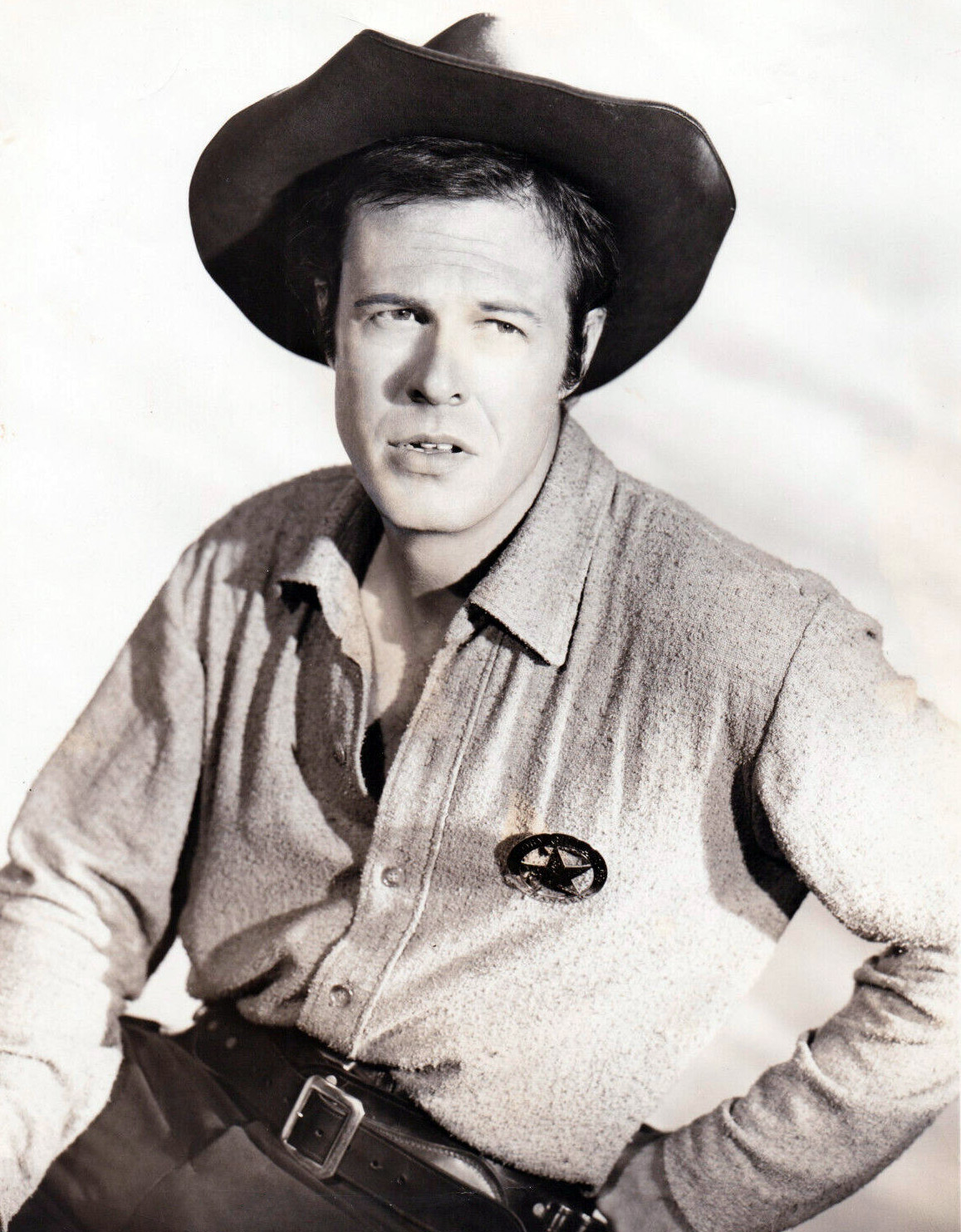
Culp as Ranger Gilman in the 1957–1959 TV Western Trackdown

Culp came to national attention early in his career as the star of the 1957–1959 CBS Western television series Trackdown, in which he played Texas Ranger Hoby Gilman, based in the town of Porter, Texas. It was one of Culp's many appearances in TV Westerns. The pilot for Trackdown was "Badge of Honor", a 1956 episode of Dick Powell's Zane Grey Theatre, in which Culp starred as Gilman.

In 1960, he appeared in two more episodes of Zane Grey Theatre, playing different roles in "Morning Incident" and "Calico Bait". After Trackdown ended in 1959 after two seasons, Culp continued to work in television, including a guest-starring role as Stewart Douglas in the 1960 episode "So Dim the Light" of CBS's anthology series The DuPont Show with June Allyson. In the summer of 1960, he guest-starred on David McLean's NBC Western series Tate.

He played Clay Horne in the series finale, "Cave-In", of the CBS Western Johnny Ringo, starring Don Durant. In 1961, Culp played the part of Craig Kern, a morphine-addicted soldier, in the episode "Incident on Top of the World" in the CBS series Rawhide. About this time, Culp was cast on the NBC anthology series, The Barbara Stanwyck Show and in the NBC Civil War drama, The Americans. Culp was cast as Captain Shark in a first-season episode of NBC's The Man from U.N.C.L.E. (1964). Some of his more memorable performances were in three episodes of the science-fiction anthology series on The Outer Limits (1963–1965), including the classic "Demon with a Glass Hand", written by Harlan Ellison. In the 1961 season, he guest-starred in an episode of NBC's Western Bonanza titled "Broken Ballad". In the 1961–1962 season, he guest-starred on ABC's crime drama Target: The Corruptors! and that network's The Rifleman. In the 1962–1963 season, he guest-starred in NBC's modern Western series Empire starring Richard Egan.

In 1964, Culp played Charlie Orwell, an alcoholic veterinarian, in an episode of The Virginian (NBC 1962–1971) titled "The Stallion". That same year, he appeared in yet another Western, Gunsmoke. In the series' episode "Hung High", he portrays an outlaw named Joe Costa, who attempts to frame Matt Dillon for lynching a prisoner who had killed the marshal's friend. In 1965, he was cast as Frank Melo in "The Tender Twigs" of James Franciscus's NBC education drama series, Mr. Novak.

Culp then played perhaps his most memorable character, American secret agent Kelly Robinson, who operated undercover as a touring tennis professional, for three years on the hit NBC series I Spy (1965–1968), with co-star Bill Cosby. Culp wrote the scripts for seven episodes, one of which he also directed and an episode earned him an Emmy nomination for writing. For all three years of the series, he was also nominated for an acting Emmy (Outstanding Performance by an Actor in a Leading Role in a Dramatic Series category), but lost each time to Cosby.

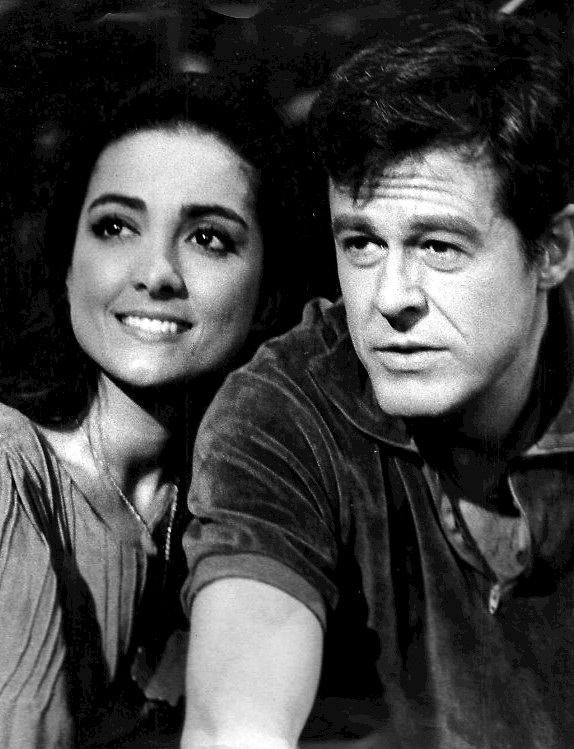
With Kamala Devi in I Spy, 1966

In 1968, Culp also made an uncredited cameo appearance as an inebriated Turkish waiter on Get Smart, the spy-spoof comedy series, in an I Spy parody episode titled "Die Spy". In this, secret agent Maxwell Smart played by Don Adams in effect assumes Culp's Kelly Robinson character, as he pretends to be an international table-tennis champion. The episode faithfully recreates the I Spy theme music, montage graphics, and back-and-forth banter between Robinson and Scott, with actor/comedian Stu Gilliam imitating Cosby.

In 1971, Culp, Peter Falk, Robert Wagner, and Darren McGavin each stepped in to take turns with Anthony Franciosa's rotation of NBC's series The Name of the Game after Franciosa was fired, alternating a lead role of the lavish, 90-minute show about the magazine business with Gene Barry and Robert Stack. Also in 1971, he portrayed an unemployed actor, the husband of ambitious Angie Dickinson, in the TV movie See the Man Run. Culp played the murderer in three Columbo episodes ("Death Lends a Hand" in 1971, "The Most Crucial Game" in 1972, "Double Exposure" in 1973) and also appeared in the 1990 episode "Columbo Goes to College" as the father of one of two young murderers. He also played the murderer in the pilot episode of Mrs. Columbo starring Kate Mulgrew in the title role.

In 1973, Culp almost took the male lead in the sci-fi television series Space: 1999. During negotiations with creator and executive producer Gerry Anderson, Culp expressed himself to be not only an asset as an actor, but also as a director and producer for the proposed series. The part instead went to Martin Landau.

Culp co-starred in The Greatest American Hero as tough veteran FBI Special Agent Bill Maxwell, who teams up with a high-school teacher who receives superpowers from extraterrestrials. He wrote and directed the second-season finale episode "Lilacs, Mr. Maxwell", with free rein to do the episode as he saw fit. The show lasted three years from 1981 to 1983. He reprised the role in the spin-off pilot The Greatest American Heroine. During that time, Culp was rumored to replace Larry Hagman as J. R. Ewing in Dallas. However, Culp firmly denied this, insisting he would never leave his role as Bill Maxwell.

Culp reunited with Cosby on The Cosby Show in the episode "Bald and Beautiful" (1987), playing Dr. Cliff Huxtable's old friend Scott Kelly. The name was a combination of their I Spy characters' names. In I Spy Returns (1994), a nostalgic television movie, Culp and Cosby reprised their roles as Robinson and Scott for the first time since 1968. Culp and Cosby reunited one last time on the television show Cosby in an episode entitled "My Spy" (1999), in which Cosby's character, Hilton Lucas, dreams he is Alexander Scott on a mission with Kelly Robinson.

Culp appeared on episodes of other television programs, including The Golden Girls where he played Simon, Blanche's beau, in the episode titled "Like the Beep Beep Beep of My Tom Tom" (1990), as well as Murder, She Wrote, Matlock, Who's the Boss?, Dr. Quinn, Medicine Woman, The Nanny, and Wings. From 1995 to 1996, he was the voice of the character Halcyon Renard in the Disney adventure cartoon Gargoyles. Culp also appeared on Walker, Texas Ranger as Lyle Pike in the episode "Trust No One" (1995).

From 1996 to 2004, Culp had a recurring role on Everybody Loves Raymond as Warren Whelan, the father of Debra Barone and father-in-law of Ray Barone. He played a CIA agent and the father of Dr. Jesse Travis on Diagnosis: Murder in the episode "Discards" (1997), along with Barbara Bain, Robert Vaughn, and Patrick Macnee. In 2007, he did a voice-over on the stop-motion sketch comedy Robot Chicken.

=== Film performances ===
Culp worked as an actor in many theatrical films, beginning with three in 1963: As naval officer John F. Kennedy's good friend Ensign George Ross in PT 109, as legendary gunslinger Wild Bill Hickok in The Raiders, and as the debonair fiancé of Jane Fonda in Sunday in New York.

He starred in Bob & Carol & Ted & Alice in 1969, with Natalie Wood. Another memorable role came as another gunslinger, Thomas Luther Price, in Hannie Caulder (1971) opposite Raquel Welch. A year later, Hickey & Boggs reunited him with Cosby for the first time since I Spy. Culp also directed this feature film, in which Cosby and he portray over-the-hill private eyes. In 1986, he had a primary role as General Woods in the comedy Combat Academy. Culp played the U.S. President in Alan J. Pakula's 1993 murder mystery, The Pelican Brief.

=== Other appearances ===
Culp appeared in the 1993 live action video game Voyeur as the game's villain, industrialist/politician Reed Hawke. He lent his voice to the digital character Dr. Wallace Breen, the prime antagonist in the 2004 computer game Half-Life 2. The video clip of "Guilty Conscience" features Culp as an erudite and detached narrator describing the scenes where Eminem and Dr. Dre rap lyrics against each other. He only appears in the music video. In the album version, the narrator is Mark Avery.

On November 9, 2007, on The O'Reilly Factor, host Bill O'Reilly interviewed Culp about the actor's career and awarded Culp the distinction "TV Icon of the Week".

=== Screenwriter ===
Culp wrote scripts for seven I Spy episodes, one of which he also directed. He later wrote and directed two episodes of The Greatest American Hero, including the series finale. Culp also wrote scripts for other television series, including Trackdown, a two-part episode from The Rifleman, and Cain's Hundred.

== Personal life ==
Culp was married five times: to Elayne Carroll (1951–1956), Nancy Ashe (1957–1966), French actress France Nuyen, whom he met when she guest-starred on I Spy (1967–1970), Sheila Sullivan (1971–1976), and Candace Faulkner (from 1981).

In addition to appearing in four episodes of I Spy, two of them written by Culp, in 1969 Nuyen also co-hosted the second episode of the TV comedy Turn-On with him, but the program was never shown, as the series was cancelled after its first airing.

Culp had three sons and a daughter with his second wife, and a daughter with his fifth wife. That daughter, producer Samantha Culp, married author Matthew Specktor in 2021.His son Joseph Culp is an actor and director; his son Jason Culp is a voice actor who has narrated many audiobooks. Culp's grandson, Elmo Kennedy O'Connor, is a rapper and performs under the alias Bones.

Culp's appearances on The Outer Limits led to a longtime friendship with Harlan Ellison who wrote for the series.

== Death ==
On March 24, 2010, Culp died at age 79 of a head injury sustained from a fall while walking near Runyon Canyon Park in Los Angeles; although Culp had apparently suffered a heart attack which caused the fall, it was the head injury that was fatal. He is buried at Sunset View Cemetery in El Cerrito. A memorial service was held at Grauman's Egyptian Theater in Los Angeles on April 10, 2010.

At the time of his death, Culp had just completed performing a supporting role as Blakesley in the film The Assignment. He was also working on several screenplays, including an adaptation of the story of Terry and the Pirates that had already been accepted for filming and was scheduled to start production in Hong Kong in 2012, with Culp directing. Terry and the Pirates had been Culp's favorite comic strip as a boy, and it was his longtime wish to make a film based on it.

== Selected filmography ==
- 1957 Alfred Hitchcock Presents (Season 2 Episode 33: "A Man Greatly Beloved") as Clarence
- 1958 TV pilot Now is Tomorrow by Richard Matheson as Captain Blair
- 1957–1959 Trackdown (TV series) (71 episodes) as Hoby Gilman
- 1957–1960 Dick Powell's Zane Grey Theatre (TV series) (3 episodes)
  - (Season 1 Episode 27: "Badge of Honor") (1957) as Hoby Gilman
  - (Season 4 Episode 26: "Calico Bait") (1960) as Deputy Sam Applegate
  - (Season 5 Episode 12: "Morning Incident") (1960) as Shad Hudson
- 1960 Outlaws (TV series) (Season 1 Episode 1: "Thirty a Month") as Sam Yadkin
- 1960 The Westerner (TV series) (Season 1 Episode 10: "Line Camp") as Shep Prescott
- 1960–1962 The Rifleman (TV series) (2 episodes)
  - (Season 2 Episode 19: "Hero") (1960) as Colly Vane
  - (Season 4 Episode 20: "The Man from Salinas") (1962) as Dave Foley
- 1961 Hennesey (TV series) (Season 2 Episode 15: "The Specialist") as Dr. Steven Gray
- 1961 Rawhide (TV series) (Season 3 Episode 12: "Incident at the Top of the World") as Craig Kern
- 1961 The Detectives Starring Robert Taylor (TV series) (Season 2 Episode 23: "Bad Apple") as Herbert Sanders
- 1961 87th Precinct (TV series) (Season 1 Episode 1: "The Floater") as Curt Donaldson
- 1961 Bonanza (TV series) (Season 3 Episode 6: "Broken Ballad") as Ed Payson
- 1961 Target: The Corruptors! (TV series) (Season 1 Episode 10: "To Wear a Badge") as Meeker
- 1963 Empire (TV series) (Season 1 Episode 18: "Where the Hawk is Wheeling") as Jared Mace
- 1963 PT 109 as Ensign George 'Barney' Ross
- 1963 Sunday in New York as Russ Wilson
- 1963 The Alfred Hitchcock Hour (Season 2 Episode 10: "Good-Bye, George") as Harry Lawrence
- 1963–1964 The Outer Limits (TV series) (3 episodes)
  - (Season 1 Episode 3: "The Architects of Fear") (1963) as Allen Leighton
  - (Season 1 Episode 9: "Corpus Earthling") (1963) as Dr. Paul Cameron
  - (Season 2 Episode 5: "Demon with a Glass Hand") (1964) as Trent
- 1964 Rhino! as Dr. Jim Hanlon
- 1964 The Man from U.N.C.L.E. (TV series) (Season 1 Episode 4: "The Shark Affair") as Captain Shark
- 1964 The Virginian (TV series) (Season 3 Episode 3: "The Stallion") as Charlie Orwell
- 1964 Gunsmoke (TV series) (Season 10 Episode 8: "Hung High") as Joe Costa
- 1965–1968 I Spy (TV series) (82 episodes) as Kelly Robinson / Chuang Tzu
- 1968 Get Smart (TV series) (Season 3 Episode 25: "Die, Spy") as Waiter (uncredited)
- 1969 Bob & Carol & Ted & Alice as Bob Sanders
- 1970 ITV Saturday Night Theatre (TV series) (Season 2 Episode 39: "Married Alive") as Colonel Peter Jardine
- 1970 The Name of the Game (TV series) (2 episodes) as Paul Tyler
  - (Season 3 Episode 3: "Cynthia is Alive and Living in Avalon")
  - (Season 3 Episode 8: "Little Bear Died Running")
- 1971 Hannie Caulder as Thomas Luther Price
- 1971 See the Man Run (TV movie) as Ben Taylor
- 1971–1990 Columbo (TV series) (4 episodes)
  - (Season 1 Episode 2: "Death Lends a Hand") (1971) as Investigator Brimmer
  - (Season 2 Episode 3: "The Most Crucial Game") (1972) as Paul Hanlon
  - (Season 3 Episode 4: "Double Exposure") (1973) as Dr. Bart Kepple
  - (Season 10 Episode 1: "Columbo Goes to College") (1990) as Jordan Rowe
- 1972 Hickey & Boggs (director) as Frank Boggs
- 1972 What's My Line? (TV series)
- 1973 A Cold Night's Death (TV movie) as Robert Jones
- 1973 A Name for Evil as John Blake
- 1973 Shaft (TV series) (Season 1 Episode 1: "The Enforcers") as Marshall Cunningham
- 1973 Outrage (TV movie) as Jim Kiler
- 1973 Match Game (TV series) as himself - Team Captain
- 1974 Houston, We've Got a Problem (TV movie) as Steve Bell
- 1974 The Castaway Cowboy as Calvin Bryson
- 1975 A Cry for Help (TV movie) as Harry Freeman
- 1975 Inside Out as Sly Wells
- 1975–1979 Police Story (TV series) (3 episodes)
  - (Season 2 Episode 14: "Year of the Dragon: Part 1") (1975) as Detective John Darrin
  - (Season 2 Episode 15: "Year of the Dragon: Part 2") (1975) as Detective John Darrin
  - (Season 6 Episode 1: "A Cry for Justice") as Sergeant Price
- 1976 Sky Riders as Jonas Bracken
- 1976 Breaking Point as Frank Sirrianni
- 1976 The Great Scout & Cathouse Thursday as Jack Colby
- 1976 Flood! (TV movie, Irwin Allen Production) as Steve Brannigan
- 1976 Silver Streak as FBI Agent (uncredited)
- 1977 Spectre (TV movie) as William Sebastian
- 1979 Hot Rod (TV movie) as T. L. Munn
- 1979 Goldengirl as Steve Esselton
- 1980 The Dream Merchants (TV mini-series) (2 episodes) (Episode 1 and Episode 2) as Henry Farnum
- 1981–1983 The Greatest American Hero (TV series) (44 episodes) as Bill Maxwell
- 1983 National Lampoon's Movie Madness as Paul Everest (segment "Success Wanters")
- 1985 Turk 182 as Mayor Tyler
- 1986 Murder, She Wrote (TV series) (Season 2 Episode 12: "Murder by Appointment Only") as Norman Amberson
- 1986 The Gladiator (TV movie) as Lieutenant Frank Mason
- 1986 The Blue Lightning (TV movie) as Lester Mclnally
- 1986 Combat High as General Woods
- 1987 The Cosby Show (TV series) (Season 3 Episode 23: "Bald and Beautiful") as Scott Kelly
- 1987 Matlock (TV series) (2 episodes) as Robert Irwin
  - (Season 2 Episode 5: "The Power Brokers: Part 1")
  - (Season 2 Episode 6: "The Power Brokers: Part 2")
- 1987 Highway to Heaven (TV series) (Season 3 Episode 21: "Parent's Day") as Ronald James
- 1987 Big Bad Mama II as Daryl Pearson
- 1989 Pucker Up and Bark Like a Dog as Gregor
- 1989 Who's the Boss? (TV Series) (Season 6 Episode 12: "Gambling Jag") as Jason
- 1990 The Golden Girls (TV series) (Season 5 Episode 17: "Like the Beep Beep Beep of the Tom Tom") as Simon
- 1991 Timebomb as Mr. Phillips
- 1993 The Pelican Brief as The President of The United States
- 1994 The Nanny (TV series) (Season 1 Episode 20: "Ode the Barbra Joan") as Stewart Babcock
- 1994 Wings (TV series) (Season 6 Episode 10: "The Wrong Stuff") as 'Ace' Galvin
- 1995 Panther as Charles Garry
- 1995 Xtro 3: Watch the Skies as Major Guardino
- 1995 Walker, Texas Ranger (TV series) (Season 3 Episode 16: "Trust No One") as Lyle Pike
- 1996 Spy Hard as Businessman
- 1996–2004 Everybody Loves Raymond (TV series) (11 episodes) as Warren Whelan
- 1997 Most Wanted as Dr. Donald Bickhart
- 1998 Conan the Adventurer (TV series) (Season 1 Episode 14: "Red Sonja") as King Vog
- 1998 Holding the Baby (TV series) (Season 1 Episode 3: "Guess Who's Not Coming to Dinner")
- 1998 Wanted as Father Patrick
- 1998–1999 The Secret Files of the Spy Dogs (TV series) (13 episodes) as Agent Three (voice)
- 1999 Unconditional Love as Karl Thomassen
- 1999 "Guilty Conscience" by Eminem (music video) as narrator
- 2000 Innocents as Judge Winston
- 2000 Newsbreak as Judge McNamara
- 2000 Chicago Hope (TV series) (Season 6 Episode 18: "Devoted Attachment") as Benjamin Quinn
- 2000 Running Mates (TV movie) as Senator Parker Gable
- 2001 Farewell, My Love as Michael Reilly
- 2001 Hunger as Chief
- 2003 The Dead Zone (TV series) (Season 2 Episode 9: "The Man Who Never Was") as Jeffrey Grissom
- 2004 The Almost Guys as The Colonel
- 2004 Half-Life 2 (video game) as Dr. Wallace Breen (voice)
- 2005 Santa's Slay as Grandpa Yuleson
- 2006 Half-Life 2: Episode One (video game) as Dr. Wallace Breen (voice)
- 2007 Robot Chicken (TV series) (Season 3 Episode 7: "Yancy the Yo-Yo Boy") as Bill Maxwell / Sheriff of Nottingham (voice)
- 2010 The Assignment as Blakesley (final film role)
