= Target: The Corruptors! =

American crime drama TV series

- Logo of Target: The Corruptors Marino, 1961
- Genre: Crime drama
- Created by: Lester Velie
- Written by: Harry Essex; Harry Kleiner; Christopher Knopf; Dick Nelson; Lester Pine; Les Ralston; Adrian Spies; Palmer Thompson
- Directed by: William Conrad; Walter Doniger; Arthur Hiller; Józef Lejtes; Don Medford; John Peyser
- Starring: Stephen McNally; Robert Harland; Harold J. Stone
- Theme music composer: Rudy Schrager
- Country of origin: United States
- Original language: English
- No. of seasons: 1
- No. of episodes: 35

Production
- Executive producers: Leonard J. Ackerman; John H. Burrows
- Producers: Mort Abrahams; Leonard J. Ackerman; John H. Burrows; Everett Chambers; Joseph Dackow; Vincent M. Fennelly; Stanley Kallis; Don Medford
- Cinematography: Charles Burke; George E. Diskant; Gilbert Warrenton
- Camera setup: Single-camera
- Running time: 48 mins.
- Production companies: Four Star Television; Velie-Burrows-Ackerman Productions

Original release
- Network: ABC
- Release: September 29, 1961 – June 8, 1962

Target: The Corruptors! is an American crime drama series starring Stephen McNally that aired on ABC from September 29, 1961 to September 21, 1962, from 10 to 11 p.m. on Fridays. The Navy Motion Picture Service also made some episodes available on 16 mm film for showing aboard ship to personnel of the United States Navy. The series's title in syndication was Expose.

== Plot ==
Paul Marino is a newspaper columnist, and Jack Flood is his assistant. Together they investigate criminal activity and expose organized rackets and corruption. In each episode they probe a different type of illegal activity such as bookmaking, charity scams, prostitution, and protection rackets.

The New York Times wrote that the first episode "indicated that the stress here may be more on violence and sensationalism than on the social phenomenon under study."

Lester Velie, one of the series's creators, said that the program was an attempt to make a different kind of series for television, one that combined "the resources of investigative journalism with the drama of television". He added that involving viewers in contemporary situations that affected people's lives would be a unique approach for a dramatic series. After the show ended, Velie had no explanation for its cancellation by ABC, especially considering its high Nielsen ratings.

== Cast ==
=== Main cast ===
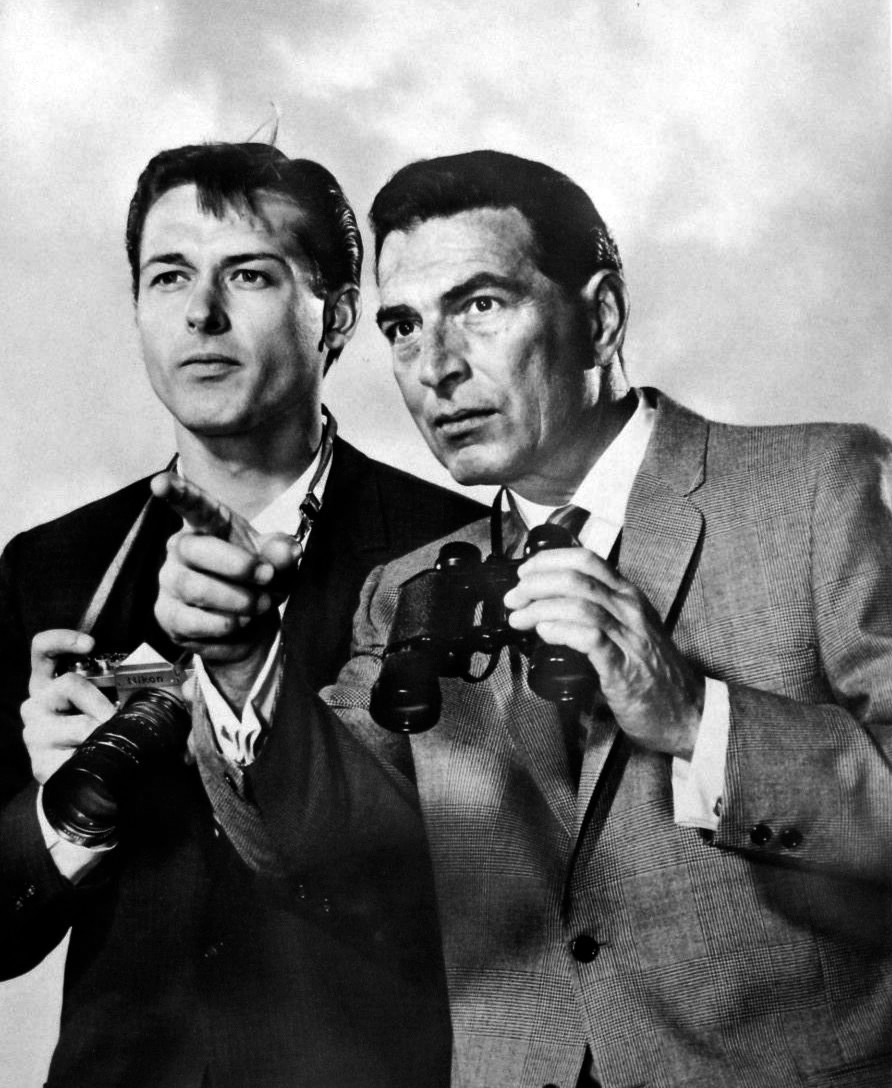
Robert Harland as Jack Flood and Stephen McNally as Paul Marino

- Stephen McNally as Paul Marino
- Robert Harland as Jack Flood
- Jo Helton as Rose Vaclavic (recurring role)
- Dennis Cross as Reicher (recurring role)

=== Guest stars ===
- Ed Asner
- Parley Baer
- Martin Balsam
- Ed Begley
- Robert Burton
- William Conrad
- Michael Constantine
- Wendell Corey
- Robert Culp
- Barbara Eden
- Jack Elam
- Peter Falk
- Felicia Farr
- Constance Ford
- Alan Hale, Jr.
- Rodolfo Hoyos Jr.
- David Janssen
- Brian Keith
- Ray Kellogg
- Jess Kirkpatrick
- Jack Klugman
- Shirley Knight
- Bethel Leslie
- Robert Loggia
- Frank Lovejoy
- Walter Matthau
- Vic Morrow
- Jeanette Nolan
- James Nusser
- Edmond O'Brien
- Dan O'Herlihy
- Warren Oates
- Suzanne Pleshette
- Gilman Rankin
- Hayden Rorke
- Gena Rowlands
- Penny Santon
- Simon Scott
- Robert F. Simon
- William Tannen
- Kelly Thordsen
- Robert Vaughn
- Virginia Vincent
- Jack Warden
- Keenan Wynn

== Production ==
The series was produced by Four Star Television. The producers were Leonard Ackerman and John Burrows. Gene Roddenberry wrote for at least one episode. Sydney Pollack directed the episode "The Wreckers".

In the opening episode, cameras used extreme closeups to show faces "in a way that projects them almost physically and uncomfortably into the living room."

== Senate hearing ==
Target: The Corruptors! was considered as part of an investigation by the Subcommittee to Investigate Juvenile Delinquency of the Committee on the Judiciary of the United States Senate. On July 28, 1961, a hearing focused on violence and crime on television, especially with regard to their depiction when many children were watching.

== Episodes ==
No.	Title	Directed by	Written by	Original release date
1	"The Million Dollar Dump"	Don Medford	Story by : Palmer Thompson; Teleplay by : Palmer Thompson & Don Brinkley & Christopher Knopf	September 29, 1961
2	"Pier 60"	Walter Doniger	Palmer Thompson	October 6, 1961
3	"The Platinum Highway"	Jules Bricken	Christopher Knopf	October 13, 1961
4	"The Invisible Government"	Robert Ellis Miller	Ellis Kadison	October 20, 1961
5	"The Poppy Vendor"	John Peyser	Les Pine	October 27, 1961
6	"Bite of a Tiger"	John Newland	David Karp	November 3, 1961
7	"Touch of Evil"	Irving Lerner	Luther Davis	November 10, 1961
8	"Mr. Megalomania"	Don Medford	Adrian Spies	November 17, 1961
9	"The Golden Carpet"	Josef Leytes	Story by : Ellis Marcus; Teleplay by : Ellis Marcus & Harold Callen	November 24, 1961
10	"To Wear a Badge"	Walter Doniger	Story by : Gene Roddenberry; Teleplay by : Harry Essex	December 1, 1961
11	"Silent Partner"	Don Medford	Story by : David Chandler & Shimon Wincelberg; Teleplay by : Shimon Wincelberg	December 8, 1961
12	"Prison Empire"	William Conrad	Harry Essex	December 15, 1961
13	"The Fix"	James Sheldon	Carey Wilber	December 22, 1961
14	"Quicksand"	Josef Leytes	Jack Curtis	December 29, 1961
15	"A Man is Waiting to Be Murdered"	John Peyser	Louis Lantz	January 5, 1962
16	"One for the Road"	Donald McDougall	Paul King	January 12, 1962
17	"Play it Blue"	William Conrad	Story by : Richard Landau; Teleplay by : Alexander Richards & Harry Essex	January 19, 1962
18	"Chase the Dragon"	Don Medford	Harry Kleiner	January 26, 1962
19	"The Middle Man"	David Alexander	Morton Fine & David Friedkin	February 2, 1962
20	"Viva Vegas"	Walter Doniger	Les Pine	February 9, 1962
21	"Fortress of Despair"	Arthur Hiller	Gilbert Ralston	February 16, 1962
22	"The Wrecker"	Sydney Pollack	Dick Nelson	March 2, 1962
23	"Babes in Wall Street"	William Conrad	Story by : Daniel Mainwaring; Teleplay by : Daniel Mainwaring & Harry Essex	March 9, 1962
24	"My Native Land"	William Conrad	Story by : Bruce Geller; Teleplay by : Jerry Sohl & Harry Essex	March 16, 1962
25	"The Malignant Hearts"	Don Medford	John Wry	March 23, 1962
26	"A Man's Castle"	William Conrad	Les Pine	March 30, 1962
27	"Journey into Mourning"	William Conrad	Christopher Knopf	April 13, 1962
28	"The Blind Goddess"	Harry Keller	Harry Kleiner	April 20, 1962
29	"A Book of Faces"	William Conrad	Dick Nelson	April 27, 1962
30	"License to Steal"	Thomas Carr	Joe Stone	May 4, 1962
31	"Yankee Dollar"	William Conrad	Max Ehrlich & Harry Essex	May 11, 1962
32	"The Organizers: Part 1"	Don Medford	Adrian Spies	May 18, 1962
33	"The Organizers: Part 2"	Unknown	Unknown	May 25, 1962
34	"Nobody Gets Hurt"	William Conrad	Ed Adamson	June 1, 1962
35	"Goodbye Children"	Lewis Allen	Les Pine	June 8, 1962
