= Tina Dupuy =

American political journalist

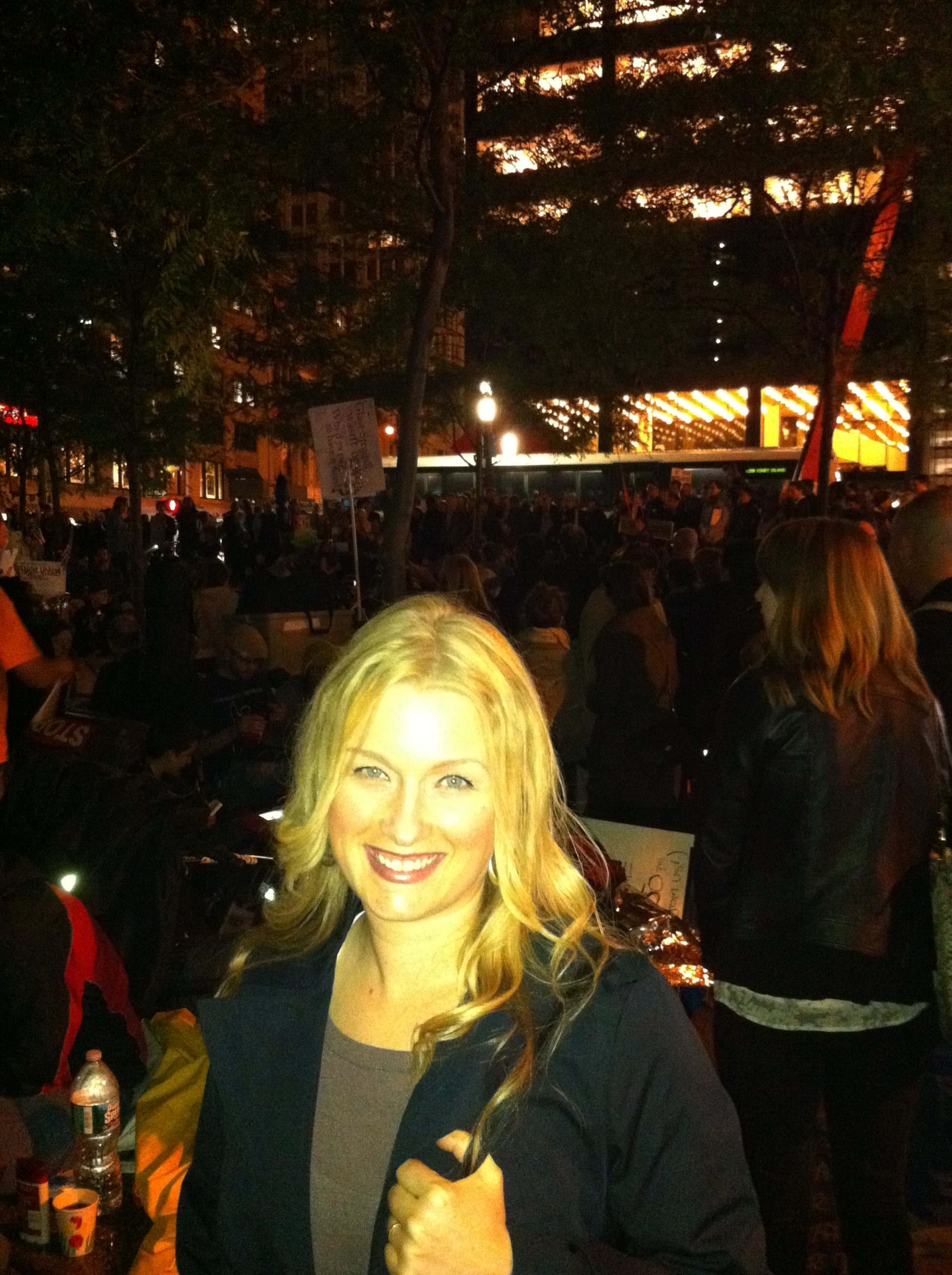
- Dupuy in October 2011 at Zuccotti Park covering Occupy Wall Street for The Atlantic
- Born: Denver, Colorado
- Occupation: Journalist
- Years active: 2005–present
- Agent: Jeff Silberman at Folio Lit
- Website: tinadupuy.com

Tina Dupuy is a nationally syndicated op-ed columnist, freelance investigative journalist and comedian. She formerly worked as communications director for Congressman Alan Grayson.

She freelances for Los Angeles Times, The Atlantic, Fast Company, LA Weekly, Newsday, Mother Jones, and Skeptic. Her weekly op-ed column is nationally syndicated through Daryl Cagle's website Cagle Cartoons. Dupuy's writing has also been published in books including a collection of short stories called What Was I Thinking? (St. Martin's Press, 2009) and the English textbook Exploring Language 13th Edition (Longman, 2011).

After The Tampa Tribune used an article of Dupuy's without paying for it in 2009, she created a YouTube video to shame the paper into paying $75 for the piece.

As a teenager, Dupuy was convinced that she was an alcoholic and joined Alcoholics Anonymous, and would eventually gain prominence for telling the story of her sobriety to AA audiences. Twenty years later, however, having drifted away from the organization, she began to question the interpretation she had been given of her life story, and decided the only way to know for sure whether she was an alcoholic was to have a drink and see what happened. She discussed the process that led to this conclusion in an interview for This American Life.

Dupuy has spoken openly about being born into the cult The Children of God and subsequently being raised in foster care in California. She created the podcast Cultish, in which she interviewed former members of cults and discussed her uncle Rick Dupuy's public defection.

In late 2017, Dupuy validated seven other female accusers in an effort to demonstrate a pattern of an abuse of power by the sitting U.S. Senator Al Franken.

Dupuy lives in Manhattan.

In April 2023, Dupuy's neighbor, Broadway actress Sheila Sullivan, then 85 years old, was given eviction papers after living in the same apartment for 40 years. Dupuy saved Sullivan's home. The story was written about in the New York Times by Michael Wilson.

In February, 2025, Dupuy was awarded the PEN America/Jean Stein Grant for Literary Oral History for her documentation of Sheila Sullivan’s life.
