= Pippa Scott =

American actress (1934–2025)

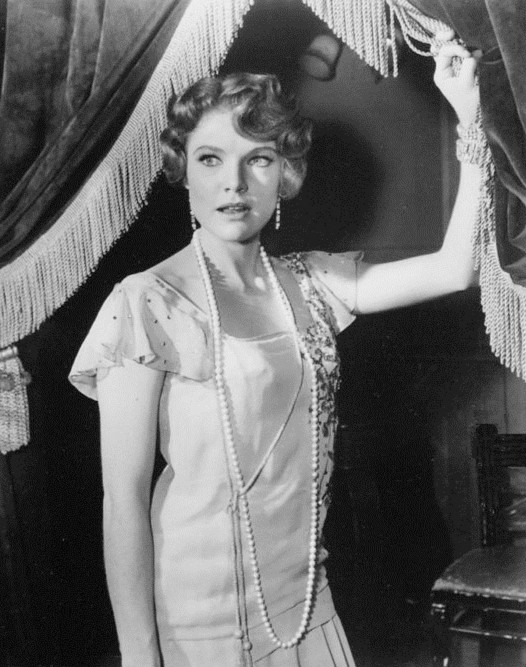
- Scott in The Twilight Zone (1960)
- Born: Philippa Scott; November 10, 1934; Los Angeles, California, U.S.
- Died: May 22, 2025 (aged 90); Santa Monica, California, U.S.
- Education: UCLA, Radcliffe
- Occupation: Actress
- Years active: 1956–1984, 2009–2013
- Spouse: Lee Rich (m. 1964; div. 1983)
- Partner(s): Lee Rich; 1996-2012 (his death)
- Children: 2
- Father: Allan Scott
- Relatives: Adrian Scott (uncle)

Philippa "Pippa" Scott (November 10, 1934 – May 22, 2025) was an American actress who appeared in film and television from the 1950s.

== Early life and education ==
Scott was born in Los Angeles, California. She was the daughter of actress Laura Straub and screenwriter Allan Scott; an uncle was the blacklisted screenwriter Adrian Scott.

In the 1970s, Scott was a student at California State Polytechnic University, Pomona, where she pursued a degree in landscape architecture.

== Career ==
=== Acting ===
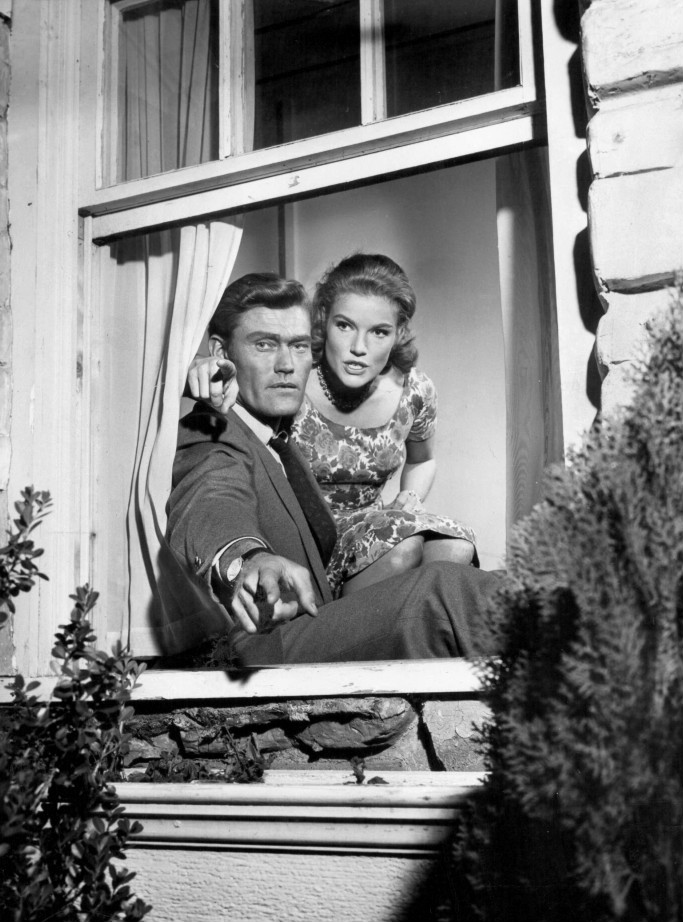
Chuck Connors and Scott in 1960

Scott attended Radcliffe and UCLA before studying at the Royal Academy of Dramatic Art in England. Shortly after her return to the United States, she won a Theatre World Award for her 1956 Broadway debut in Child of Fortune. Scott then quickly signed a contract with Warner Bros. and made her movie debut that same year as Lucy, a niece of John Wayne's character in John Ford's epic The Searchers.

Scott was cast in the 1958 film As Young as We Are in the role of a new high-school teacher who falls in love with the character Hank Moore, played by Robert Harland, who turns out to be a student. She appeared as Pegeen in the 1958 Warner Bros. film, Auntie Mame.

She appeared as Abigail in the 1959 episode of Maverick titled "Easy Mark" starring Jack Kelly as Bart Maverick. In the 1959–1960 CBS Television series Mr. Lucky, starring John Vivyan and Ross Martin, she had a recurring role as Maggie Shank-Rutherford. Around this time, she also appeared on the ABC-TV Western series, The Alaskans, starring Roger Moore.

Scott guest-starred on such series as The DuPont Show with June Allyson; The Twilight Zone in "The Trouble with Templeton" starring Brian Aherne and Sydney Pollack (in which she performed a bravura 1920s dance sequence); Thriller; F Troop; Have Gun - Will Travel with Richard Boone; Redigo; The Tall Man with Clu Gulager; The Dick Van Dyke Show; The Rat Patrol; Gomer Pyle - U.S.M.C.; and Gunsmoke (as a woman, taken by Native Americans during a raid, who during a year of captivity falls in love with a native suitor in the S7E10 “Indian Ford” in 1961).

In 1962–1963, she appeared in the first season of NBC's The Virginian in the recurring role of Molly Wood, publisher, editor, and reporter of The Medicine Bow Banner. She made two guest appearances on Perry Mason, starring Raymond Burr. In 1963, she played defendant Gwynn Elston in "The Case of the Bigamous Spouse"; in 1966, she played defendant Ethel Andrews in "The Case of the Fanciful Frail".

In 1964, she guest-starred with Eddie Albert and Claude Rains in the episode "A Time to Be Silent" of The Reporter. She guest-starred in "The Garden House", an episode of ABC's The Fugitive, starring David Janssen. Her last notable film roles were the wife of Dick Van Dyke's character in the comedy Cold Turkey (1971), and as Dabney Coleman's wife in the TV movie Bad Ronald (1974), although she sporadically played minor characters throughout the 1970s and '80s, including a 1971 guest spot in the episode "Didn't You Used to Be ... Wait ... Don't Tell Me" of The Mary Tyler Moore Show.

In 1972, Scott appeared in the educational short film Magical Disappearing Money, where she starred as a grocery consultant advising people about saving money by buying cheaper items, and how they can substitute for expensive items. The short was later featured on the RiffTrax website and YouTube channel.

She played an actress stranded in Virginia due to money problems in a 1973 episode of The Waltons. In 1973, she played a murder victim in Columbo: Requiem for a Falling Star. Her last regular TV role was as nursery-school teacher Maggie Hearn in the 15-episode 1976 NBC police drama Jigsaw John starring Jack Warden.

She returned to the big screen in 2011's Footprints, for which she was nominated for the Stockholm Krystal Award for Best Supporting Actress at the Method Fest Independent Film Festival.

=== Off-screen work in film ===
Scott produced, wrote the screenplay for, and directed King Leopold's Ghost (2006), a film based on the book of the same name by Adam Hochschild.

== Personal life and death ==
Scott married Lee Rich, a founding partner of Lorimar Productions, in 1964. They had two children together before they divorced in 1983, though they reconnected in 1996 and maintained a relationship until his death in 2012.

By the 1990s, Scott had become active in human-rights work, such as supporting the Commission of Experts formed under United Nations Security Council Resolution 780 in its research of the "widespread violations of international humanitarian law" committed during the Bosnian genocide.

Scott died of heart failure at her home in Santa Monica, California, on May 22, 2025, at the age of 90.

== Partial filmography ==
Year	Title	Role	Notes
1956	The Searchers	Lucy Edwards	
1958	As Young as We Are	Kim Hutchins	
1958	Auntie Mame	Pegeen Ryan	
1963	My Six Loves	Dianne Soper	
1964	Quick, Let's Get Married	Gina	Original title: "The Confession"
1966	For Pete's Sake!	Attendant's Wife	
1968	Petulia	May	
1969	Some Kind of a Nut	Doctor Sara	
1971	Cold Turkey	Natalie Brooks	
1972	Magical Disappearing Money	Grocery Witch	Educational short
1984	The Sound of Murder	Ilene Forbes	
2011	Footprints	Genevieve	
2013	Automotive	Helen	

== Television ==
Year	Title	Role	Notes
1955	Your Play Time	Vicky	Episode: "Speaking to Hannah"
1956	Camera Three		Episode: "The Victorian Era: Part 2"
1957	Producers' Showcase	Hannah Vestera	Episode: "Mayerling"
1959	General Electric Theater	Mary	Episode: "Robbie and His Mary"
1959	Maverick	Abigail Hamilton	Episode: "Easy Mark"
1959-60	Mr Lucky	Maggie	8 episodes
1959-1962	Adventures in Paradise	Various	4 episodes
1960	The DuPont Show with June Allyson	Sally Ainsworth	Episode: "Trial by Fear"
1960	The Alaskans	Ruth Coleman	Episode: "Sign of the Kodiak"
1960	The Aquanauts	Oga Danylo	Episode: "The Stowaway"
1960	The Twilight Zone	Laura Templeton	Episode: "The Trouble with Templeton"
1960	Hong Kong	Peggy Jackson	Episode: "When Strangers Meet"
1960-1961	Outlaws	Donna Pringle/Janet Holbrook	3 episodes
1961	Stagecoach West	Susan McLord	Episode: "Object: Patrimony"
1961	Thriller	Marcia Elizabeth Hunter	Episode: "Parasite Mansion"
1961	Have Gun - Will Travel	Kathy Rousseau	Episode: "Uneasy Grave"
1961, 1971	Gunsmoke	Mary Tabor/Sarah Mather	2 episodes
1962	The Tall Man	Anne Drake	Episode: "The Girl from Paradise"
1962	Dr. Kildare	Dr. Elizabeth Cullus	Episode: "The Search"
1962	Bus Stop	Betty Sloane	Episode: "Door Without a Key"
1962	Follow the Sun	Amy Ramsey	Episode: "Run, Clown, Run"
1962	The United States Steel Hour		2 episodes
1962	The Virginian	Molly Wood	6 episodes
1963-1966	Perry Mason	Ethel AndrewsGwen Elston	3 episodes
1964	The Fugitive	Carol Willard	Episode: "The Garden House"
1964	Wagon Train	Dorthea Gillford	Episode: "The Link Cheney Story"
1964	Gomer Pyle, U.S.M.C.	Captain "Iron Pants" Martin	Episode: "Captain Ironpants"
1964	The Reporter	Joan Cannon	Episode: "A Time to Be Silent"
1964-1965	Ben Casey	Various	3 episodes
1965	The Rogues	Jane Tyler	Episode: "The Golden Ocean"
1965	Kraft Suspense Theatre	Dr. Marianne Scott	Episode: "Nobody Will Ever Know"
1966	The Dick Van Dyke Show	Dorothy	Episode: "Buddy Sorrell: Man and Boy"
1966	Bob Hope Presents the Chrysler Theatre	Martha Harris/Catherine Rogers	2 episodes
1966	The Felony Squad	Elena Carter	Episode: "Flame Out"
1966	Insight	Jacqueline Sutton	Episode: "Trial by Fire"
1967	Tarzan	Diana Grayson	Episode: "Track of the Dinosaur"
1967	F Troop	Mrs. Molly Walker	Episode: "The Sergeant and the Kid"
1967	T.H.E. Cat		Episode: "The Turn the Other Cheek Brief"
1967	The Rat Patrol	Drucilla	Episode: "The Death Do Us Part Raid"
1967	I Spy	Bobbie	Episode: "Apollo"
1968	Judd, for the Defense	Jean Merritt	Episode: "The Worst of Both Worlds"
1968	Family Affair	Eileen Moran	Episode: "Family Portrait"
1969	The Outsider	Virginia Kirk	Episode: "The Secret of Mareno Bay"
1969	The Outcasts	Augusta Barnes	Episode: "The Town That Wouldn't"
1970	Lancer	Rebecca Brown	Episode: "Lamp in the Wilderness"
1971	Medical Center	Nancy Havers	Episode: "The Corrupted"
1971	Sarge	Dr. Windsor	Episode: "Identity Crisis"
1971	Arnie		Episode: "Something Old, Something New, Something Borrowed, Something Blew"
1971	The Mary Tyler Moore Show	Estelle Kamsen Proust	Episode: "Didn't You Used to Be...Wait...Don't Tell Me"
1971	Love, American Style	Kathy	Segment: "Love and the Black Limousine"
1971	Longstreet	Julia Woodley	Episode: "There Was a Crooked Man"
1971, 1975	Mannix	Barbara Brockway/Wanda Kerts	2 episodes
1972	Owen Marshall, Counselor at Law	Joan Price	Episode: "The Color of Respect"
1972	Mission: Impossible	Edith Thatcher	Episode: "Leona"
1972	The Rookies	Claudia Wyatt	Episode: "A Very Special Piece of Ground"
1973	The Waltons	Alvira Drummond	Episode: "The Actress"
1973	Columbo	Jean Davis	Episode: "Requiem for a Falling Star"
1973	Barnaby Jones	Janice Harley	Episode: "Fatal Flight"
1974	Cannon	Miriam Eckworth	Episode: "Bobby Loved Me"
1974	The Cowboys	Kate Tatum	Episode: "A Matter of Honor"
1974	Ironside	Crystal Mason	2 episodes
1974	The Streets of San Francisco	Edith Downing	Episode: "Once Chance to Live"
1974	Bad Ronald	Mrs Wood	TV movie
1975	Kolchak: The Night Stalker	Tillie Jones	Episode: "Legacy of Terror"
1975	Matt Helm	Phylis Hartley	Episode: "Double Jeopardy"
1975	This Is the Life	Stephanie	Episode: "Jeremy"
1976	Popi	Mrs. James	Episode: "Man's Best Amigo"
1976	Jigsaw John	Maggie Hearn	
1977	The Hardy Boys/Nancy Drew Mysteries	Janet Musante	Episode: "A Haunting We Will Go"
1984	Remington Steele	Emily Dumont	Episode: "Molten Steele"
