= June Whitley =

Canadian actress

June Whitley (born June Culbertson) was a Canadian actress who has performed on radio, television, and film.

== Early years ==
Whitley was born June Culbertson in Vancouver. She is the daughter of Mr. and Mrs. F. A. Culbertson. Her early acting experience came in the Vancouver Little Theatre and Theatre Under the Stars.

== Career ==
Whitley performed on Canadian Broadcasting Corporation radio programs before leaving in 1947. Her work for CBC included having featured roles on Stage Party and Vancouver Theatre. She moved to Hollywood, where she acted in films and on radio. From 1949 through 1953, she portrayed Margaret Anderson, the wife and mother on the radio version of Father Knows Best. She also appeared on other radio programs, including Suspense and The Mercury Theatre on the Air.

Whitley's television debut came on The Alan Young Show, and she became a regular on that program, Other TV programs on which Whitley appeared include Dragnet and Mr. and Mrs. North.

Whitley's first film was One Sunday Afternoon. She also appeared in A Steak for Connie in a supporting role and dubbed its Spanish version. That experience led to her dubbing other films. Her other film appearances included Confidentially Connie, Easy to Love, and Bright Victory.

== Personal life ==
She married journalist Bill Whitley in 1943.
