= Nightmare (1963 The Outer Limits) =

- The Outer Limits episode
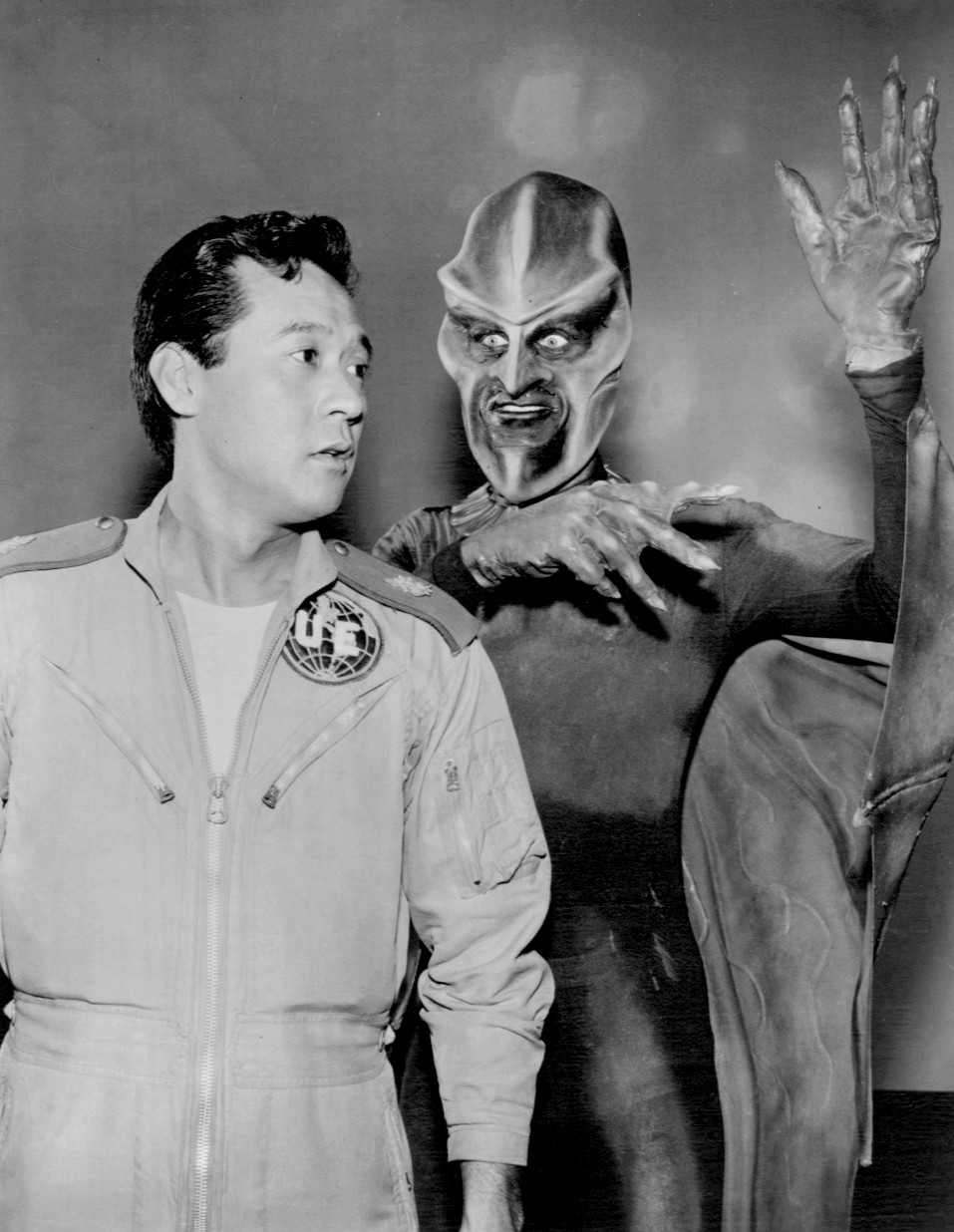
- James Shigeta as Major Jong, John Anderson as the Ebonite Interrogator
- Episode no.: Season 1 Episode 10
- Directed by: John Erman
- Written by: Joseph Stefano
- Cinematography by: John M. Nickolaus
- Production code: 15
- Original air date: December 2, 1963

Guest appearances
- James Shigeta; Ed Nelson; Martin Sheen; Bill Gunn; David Frankham; John Anderson

Episode chronology
← Previous "Corpus Earthling"	Next → "It Crawled Out of the Woodwork"

"Nightmare" is an episode of the original The Outer Limits television show. It first aired on December 2, 1963, during the first season.

== Premise ==
A group of space troopers are psychologically tortured in an alien prisoner-of-war camp.

== Plot ==
In response to an unprovoked nuclear attack from the planet Ebon, a group of soldiers–representing Unified Earth–is sent to fight the enemy on their alien world. Captured en route to Ebon, the soldiers undergo physical and psychological torture and interrogation at the hands of the Ebonites, who possess the ability to control physical abilities and senses. The prisoners become suspicious of each other when their captors claim they have received cooperation in obtaining military secrets, which is further complicated by each one's past and ethnic origins, along with the unexpected appearance of high-ranking Earth officers among the hostile aliens. The Earthmen are subjected to various interactive images of relatives and friends which have been implanted in their minds during questioning, allowing them to feel a false sense of security, or surfacing deeply hidden emotional conflicts. In the end, it is revealed that all of this is a military "game", organized by the Earth officers to test their troops' loyalty and valor under intense interrogation and psychological stress. The Earth-Ebon war itself is a fake, as the Ebonites' initial bombardment was unintentional and for which they had apologized. Unexpected accidents and deaths having occurred during the test, the Ebonites –who are, in actuality, a peaceful and honorable alien civilization– ultimately demand that such an immoral and inhuman experiment should end at once. Nevertheless they fail to prevent one last man from being killed, one of the conspiring Earth officers thought to be an illusion created by the Ebonites to trick the captives into revealing more information.

== Closing narration ==
The exploration of human behavior under simulated conditions of stress is a commonplace component of the machinery called war. So long as Man anticipates and prepares for combat, be it with neighboring nations or with our neighbors in space, these unreal games must be played, and there are only real men to play them. According to established military procedure, the results of the Ebon maneuvers will be recorded in books and fed into computers for the edification and enlightenment of all the strategists of the future. Perhaps they will learn something.

== Original air date and reception ==
Originally scheduled to air on November 25, 1963, this episode was delayed until December 2 due to television coverage of the state funeral of President John F. Kennedy. When the episode did air (in December) it was one of the most watched television episodes aired at the time, and the most-watched television broadcast of any show that week in every television media market in Maine, Wyoming, Alabama, South Carolina and Tennessee as well as in every media market in Georgia outside of Atlanta. Science fiction writers Harlan Ellison and Robert A. Heinlein both said they believed it was the best episode of the original season of The Outer Limits.

== Cast ==
- Ed Nelson – as Col. Luke Stone
- James Shigeta – as Maj. Jong
- Martin Sheen – as Pvt. Arthur Dix
- Sasha Harden – as Lt. Esra Krug
- Bill Gunn – as Pvt. James P. Willowmore
- David Frankham – as Capt. Terence Ralph Brookman
- John Anderson – as the Ebonite Interrogator
- Whit Bissell – as the General
- Bernard Kates – as Dr. Whorf
- Willard Sage – as Chief of Staff
- Ben Wright – as Gen. Benton
- Martin Brandt – as Krug's Grandfather
- Lisa Mann – as Krug's Governess
- Lillian Adams – as Dix's Mother
- Paul Stader – as Ebonite Guard (uncredited)
