= Sheila Sullivan =

American actress (born 1937)

Sheila Rae Sullivan (born August 1, 1937 in Renton, Washington) is a Broadway actress and singer.

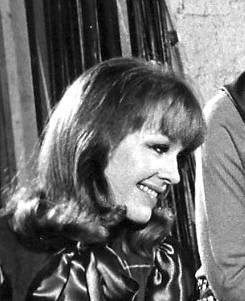
Sheila Sullivan in "Play It Again Sam"

In 1957, Sullivan was a Tropicana girl at the Tropicana Hotel and Casino then run by mobster Johnny Roselli. Sullivan performed as a chorus girl with Eddie Fisher opening night. In 1958 she wrote a letter to the head of publicity at Convair, Ned Root, and volunteered to man history's first spaceship. Instead of sending her to the moon, like she wanted, Ned Root made her his wife.

In 1964, Sullivan was the understudy for Paula Wayne in Golden Boy with Sammy Davis Jr. The Tony-winning musical included Broadway's first interracial kiss. The billboard outside the Majestic Theater featuring Davis (a Black man) and Wayne (a white woman) was riddled with bullets because of it. On March 25, 1965, Sullivan arrived in Montgomery, Alabama with her cast members in an effort to support Martin Luther King Jr. for the third March to Montgomery. After two days of extreme weather conditions, no sleep, and tumult, Sullivan was still wearing heels when she marched over the Edmund Pettus Bridge. The next day, Golden Boy's leading lady, Wayne, called in sick for the first time. Sullivan's Broadway debut was as Wayne's replacement for the lead's love interest Lorna Moon, mere hours after her participation in the Selma march.

The producer of Golden Boy, Hilly Elkins, was dating Sullivan. One night Elkins stormed into the apartment Sullivan shared with Corky Hale, violently attacked Sullivan banging her head into the floor. It was her neighbor Gloria Steinem who called the police and saved Sullivan's life.

Sullivan's second husband was actor Robert Culp. She appeared with her husband in several films including Hickey & Boggs (1972), A Name For Evil (1973), Houston, We've Got a Problem (1974) and Give Me Liberty (1974).

In April 2023, living in her small Upper West Side one-room apartment for more than 40 years, Sullivan was served eviction papers. With the help of her neighbor, journalist Tina Dupuy, the problem was found, stopping the eviction: a city agency that had been subsidizing her rent, for which she still qualified, had stopped paying its share after a request for the current status had been lost and not satisfied.
