= Meyer Dolinsky =

American screenwriter

Meyer Dolinsky (October 13, 1923 – February 29, 1984), aka Mike Dolinsky (sometimes credited as "Michael Adams" or "Mike Adams"), was an American screenwriter. Before transitioning to the screen, he wrote radio scripts.

Meyer Dolinsky was born in Chicago, Illinois, the son of Hyman Dolinsky (1891–1977) and Lillian Dolinsky (née Milkman 1897–1975). He taught at Westchester High School in Los Angeles, California. He died in Los Angeles.

== Books ==
- Mind One (1972), Dell Books, ISBN 0-86007-079-4

== Radio scripts ==
Series	Episode Title	Date
The Whistler	"Seven Steps To Murder"	2 March 1947
The Whistler	"Ambassador of Death"	16 June 1947
The Whistler	"Shakedown"	16 January 1949
The Whistler	"Returned with the Spray"	23 April 1950
The Whistler	"The Doctor's Wife"	28 October 1951
Escape	"A Source of Irritation"	5 July 1953
Escape	"Elementals"	10 October 1953
Suspense	"Elementals"	12 June 1960

== Filmography ==
=== Films ===
Year	Film	Credit	Notes
1955	The First Mintmaster	Written By	
1955	The Touch of Steel	Written By	
1957	Hot Rod Rumble	Written By	
1958	As Young as We Are	Screenplay By, Story By	Co-Wrote Story with "William Alland"
1972	The Manhunter	Screenplay By	Based on the novel by "Wade Miller"
1977	SST: Death Flight	Screenplay By	Co-Wrote Screenplay with "Robert L. Joseph". Based on a story by "Guerdon Trueblood"
1978	The Fifth Floor	Written By	

=== Television ===
Year	TV Series	Credit	Notes
1956	Dr. Hudson's Secret Journal	Writer	1 Episode
1956–57	Science Fiction Theatre	Writer	2 Episodes
1959	World of Giants	Writer	2 Episodes
1959–60	Men into Space	Writer	3 Episodes
1960-61	The DuPont Show with June Allyson	Writer	3 Episodes
1960-61	Lock-Up	Writer	4 Episodes
1961	The Detectives Starring Robert Taylor	Writer	1 Episode
1962	Adventures in Paradise	Writer	1 Episode
1962	Laramie	Writer	1 Episode
1962	Stoney Burke	Writer	1 Episode
1963	Bonanza	Writer	1 Episode
1963	The Greatest Show on Earth	Writer	1 Episode
1963–64	The Outer Limits	Writer	3 Episodes
1963–65	Mr. Novak	Writer	5 Episodes
1964	Ben Casey	Writer	1 Episode
1964	The Farmer's Daughter	Writer	3 Episodes
1964	Wagon Train	Writer	1 Episode
1965	Dr. Kildare	Writer	4 Episodes
1965	12 O'Clock High	Writer	1 Episode
1966	Please Don't Eat the Daisies	Writer	1 Episode
1966	Daktari	Writer	1 Episode
1967	The Invaders	Writer	2 Episodes
1967	Judd for the Defense	Writer	1 Episode
1968	Star Trek	Writer	1 Episode
1969	Mission: Impossible	Writer	1 Episode
1969–73	Hawaii Five-O	Writer	6 Episodes
1970	Storefront Lawyers	Writer	1 Episode
1970	Then Came Bronson	Writer	1 Episode
1972–74	Cannon	Writer	5 Episodes
1975	Marcus Welby, M.D.	Writer	1 Episode
1976	Harry-O	Writer	1 Episode
1979	Big Shamus, Little Shamus	Writer	1 Episode
