= Father Knows Best =

American television program (1954–1960)

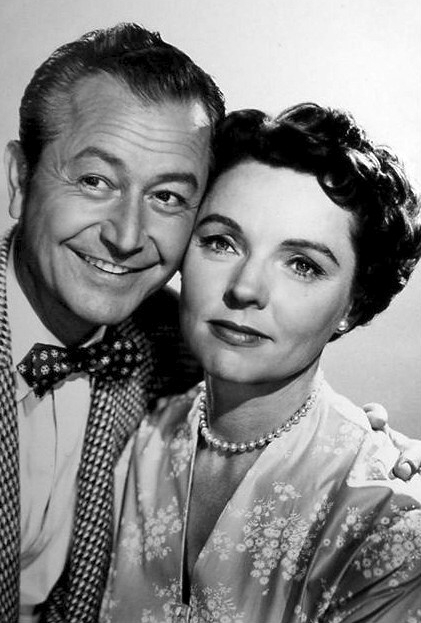
- Robert Young and Jane Wyatt as Jim and Margaret Anderson
- Genre: Sitcom
- Created by: Ed James
- Directed by: Peter Tewksbury
- Starring: Robert Young; Jane Wyatt; Elinor Donahue; Billy Gray; Lauren Chapin; June Whitley; Jean Vander Pyl; Eleanor Audley; Rhoda Williams; Ted Donaldson; Norma Jean Nilsson
- Country of origin: United States
- Original language: English
- No. of seasons: 6
- No. of episodes: 203 (list of episodes)

Production
- Producers: Murray Bolen; Ken Burton; Fran Van Hartesfeldt
- Running time: 26 minutes
- Production companies: Rodney-Young Productions; Screen Gems

Original release
- Network: CBS (1954–1955, 1958–1960); NBC (1955–1958)
- Release: October 3, 1954 – May 23, 1960

Father Knows Best is an American sitcom starring Robert Young, Jane Wyatt, Elinor Donahue, Billy Gray and Lauren Chapin. The series, which began on radio in 1949, aired as a television show for six seasons and 203 episodes. Created by Ed James, Father Knows Best follows the lives of the Andersons, a middle-class family living in the town of Springfield. The state in which Springfield is located is never specified, but it is generally accepted to be located in the Midwestern United States.

The television series debuted on CBS in October 1954. It ran for one season and was canceled by CBS but picked up by NBC, where it remained for three seasons. After cancellation by NBC in 1958, the series returned to CBS, where it aired until May 1960.

== Radio ==
The episode from the radio version, "A Carnival In Town"

The series began on August 25, 1949, on NBC Radio. Set in the Midwest, it starred Robert Young as the General Insurance agent Jim Anderson. His wife Margaret was first portrayed by June Whitley and later by Jean Vander Pyl. The Anderson children were Betty (Rhoda Williams), Bud (Ted Donaldson) and Kathy (Norma Jean Nilsson). Others in the cast were Eleanor Audley, Herb Vigran, and Sam Edwards. Sponsored through most of its run by General Foods, the series was heard Thursday evenings on NBC until March 25, 1954.

On the radio program, the character of Jim differs from the later television character. The radio Jim is far more sarcastic and shows he really rules over his family. Jim also calls his children names, something common on radio but lost in the TV series. For example, Jim says, "What a bunch of stupid children I have." Margaret is portrayed as a paragon of solid reason and patience, unless the plot calls for her to act a bit off; for example, in a Halloween episode, Margaret cannot understand how a table floats in the air. But that is a rare exception.

Betty, on radio, is portrayed as a status-seeking, boy-crazy teenage girl. To her, every little thing is "the worst thing that could ever happen." Bud, on radio, is portrayed as an "all-American" boy who always seems to need "just a bit more" money, though he receives $1.25 (nearly $16.50 in 2025) per week in allowance. Bud is expected to always answer the phone, which he hates. He is also shown as a somewhat dim boy who takes everything literally; for example, Jim might say, "Go jump in the lake," to which Bud would reply, "Okay, Dad; which lake should I go jump into?" He also uses the phrase "Holy Cow!" to express displeasure. On radio, Kathy often is portrayed as a source of irritation. She whines, cries and complains about her status in the family. She often is a source of money for her brother and sister, although she is in hock several years on her own allowance.

In an interview published in the magazine Films of the Golden Age (Fall 2015), Young revealed about the radio program: "I never quite liked it because it had to have laughs. And I wanted a warm relationship show ... When we moved to TV I suggested an entirely new cast and different perspective."

== Television series ==
The May 27, 1954, episode of The Ford Television Theatre show was called "Keep It in the Family." This 26-minute episode stars Robert Young as Jim Warren, head of the Warren family. With him was wife Grace (Ellen Drew), older daughter Peggy (Sally Fraser), younger daughter Patty (Tina Thompson) and son Jeff (Gordon Gebert). Developed by Young and his partner Eugene Rodney, it was intended as a pilot for a Father Knows Best television series. In the episode, Peggy dreams of making it as an actress, but a talent scout who has raised her hopes just wants people for his acting school.

Of the radio cast, only Robert Young remained when the series moved to CBS television:

- James "Jim" Anderson Sr.: Robert Young
- Margaret Anderson: Jane Wyatt
- Betty "Princess" Anderson: Elinor Donahue
- James "Bud" Anderson Jr.: Billy Gray
- Kathy "Kitten" Anderson: Lauren Chapin

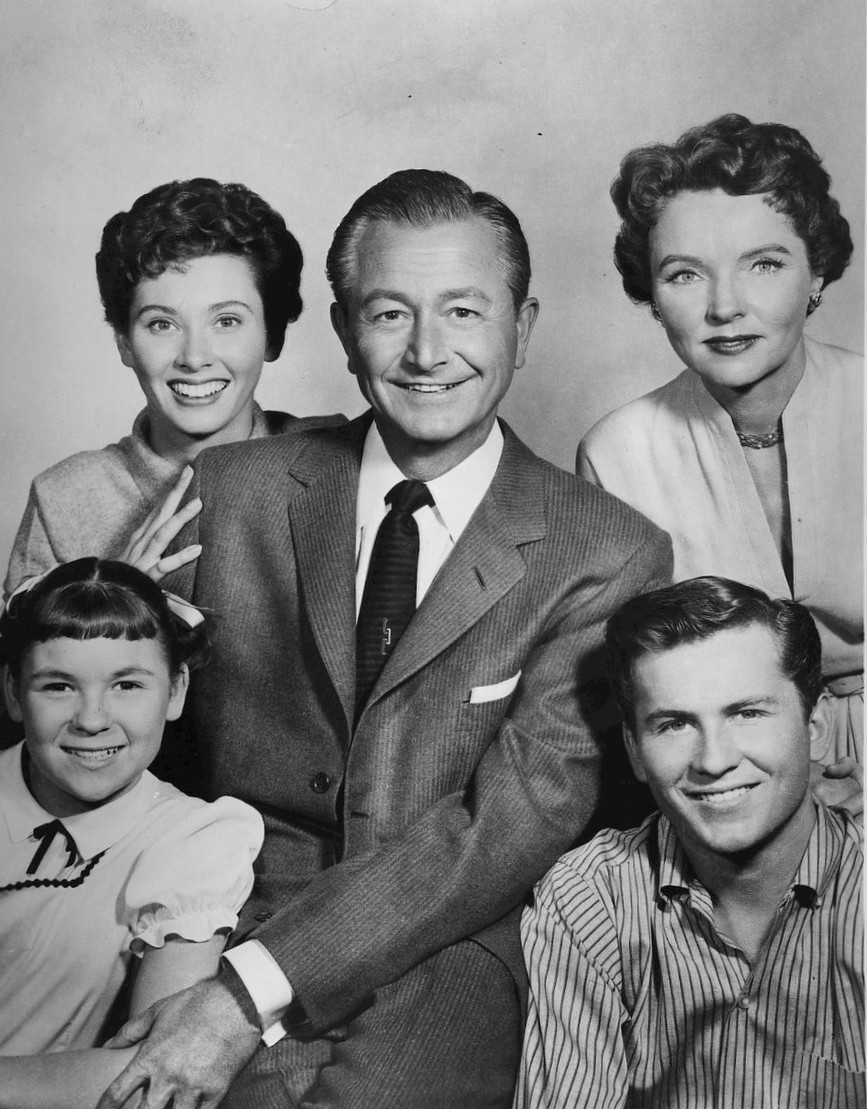
The Andersons – top from left: Elinor Donahue, Robert Young, Jane Wyatt – bottom: Lauren Chapin, Billy Gray

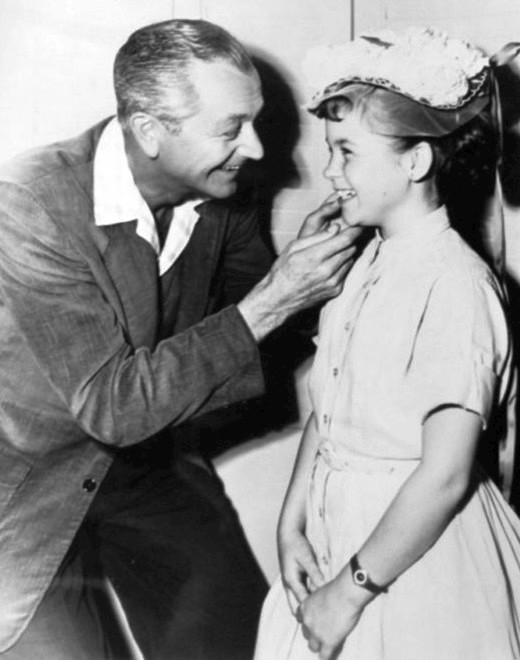
Jim with daughter Kathy, 1957

The series premiered on October 3, 1954, on CBS, where it aired Sundays at 10 p.m. (ET). Lorillard's Kent cigarettes sponsored the show in its first season. After 13 episodes the sponsor decided not to renew it when its 26-week run ended. An article in the trade publication Billboard noted the program's cost (approximately $30,000 per week), the weakness of Honestly, Celeste! (its lead-in for most of the first 13 weeks), and reduction of sales of cigarettes because of a cancer scare.

Scott Paper Company became the primary sponsor when the series moved to NBC in the fall of 1955, where it aired Wednesdays at 8:30 p.m. (ET) for the next three seasons. Scott Paper remained as sponsor even after the show returned to CBS in September 1958, where it aired Mondays at 8:30 p.m. (ET) for the last two seasons, with Lever Brothers as an alternate sponsor from 1957 through 1960. A total of 203 episodes were produced, running until September 17, 1960, and appearing on all three of the television networks of the time, including prime-time repeats from September 1960 through April 1963.

As before, the character of Margaret was portrayed as a voice of reason, and Jim's character was that of a thoughtful father who offered sage advice in response to his children's problems. A responsible man, he loved his wife and children and would do whatever he could to give them a better life. Jim was a salesman and manager of the General Insurance Company in Springfield, while Margaret was a housewife. Their home was located at 607 Maple Avenue. One history of the series characterized the Andersons as "truly an idealized family, the sort that viewers could relate to and emulate." As the two eldest children aged from teenager to young adult, Betty (1956) and Bud (1959) graduated from high school and attended Springfield Junior College.

Vivi Janiss played the part of Myrtle Davis in 11 sporadic episodes from 1954 to 1959.

Father Knows Best had become so ingrained in American pop culture as an idyllic presentation of family life that in 1959, the U.S. Department of the Treasury commissioned a special 30-minute episode of the show titled "24 Hours in Tyrant Land". Never aired on television, the episode—distributed to schools, churches and civic groups—promoted the purchase of savings bonds. The episode was later included on the Season 1 DVD.

Young left the series in 1960 at the height of the show's popularity to work on other projects, but reruns continued to air in primetime for another three years, on CBS from 1960 to 1962 and on ABC from 1962 to 1963. Following that, reruns were shown on ABC-TV in the early afternoon for several years.

On November 22, 1963, at 1:42 p.m. EST during a rerun of the third-season episode "Man About Town" on several ABC affiliates, mostly in the Mountain Time Zone (WABC-TV in New York was airing a local repeat of The Ann Sothern Show), ABC News broke into the program with the first bulletin of the news of the assassination of President Kennedy in Dallas, Texas.

The façade of the Anderson house depicted in the series' opening credits is the same structure used as Mr. George Wilson's home in the television series Dennis the Menace and again, in remodeled form, as Captain/Major Anthony Nelson's residence in I Dream of Jeannie. Originally built in 1941 during the production of a series of Blondie movies, this theatrical property continued to serve for many more years as part of the backlot of Columbia Pictures (now Warner Brothers Ranch in Burbank, California). The house can also be seen in both its familiar Father Knows Best style and later renovated variations in episodes of Hazel, Bewitched, The Monkees, The Partridge Family and in numerous other television comedies and dramas.

=== 1977 reunion films ===
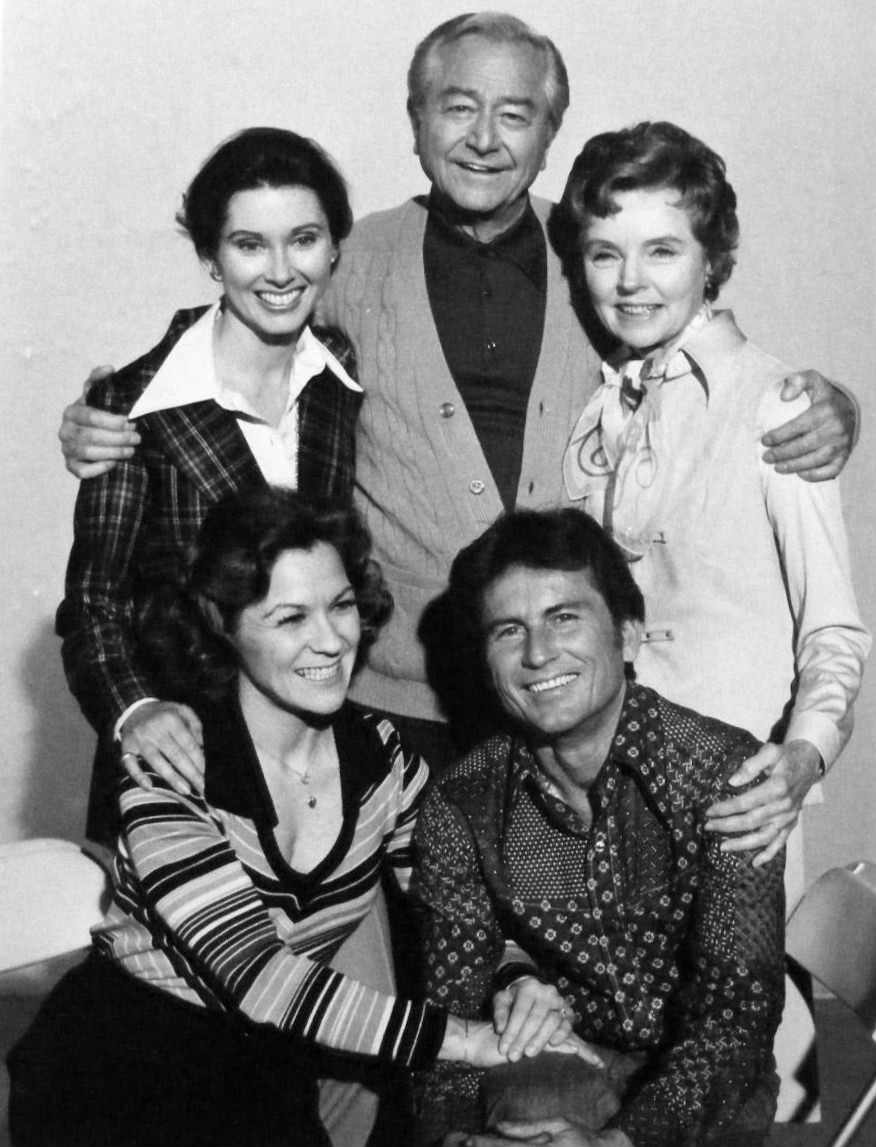
Cast photo from Father Knows Best Reunion. Standing, from left: Elinor Donahue, Robert Young and Jane Wyatt. Seated: Lauren Chapin and Billy Gray.

The TV cast reunited for a pair of TV films on NBC: Father Knows Best Reunion on May 15, 1977, and Father Knows Best: Home for Christmas on December 18, 1977. In the 17 years since the series had ended, the characters of Betty and Bud had both married and had families of their own. Betty was the widowed mother of two girls, Jenny (Cari Anne Warder) and Ellen (Kyle Richards), while Bud and his wife Jean (Susan Adams) were the parents of a son, Robert "Robby" (Christopher Gardner). Kathy had become engaged to a doctor, Jason Harper (Hal England).

== Home media ==
Shout! Factory has released all six seasons of Father Knows Best on DVD in Region 1. Season 5 and 6 were released as Shout! Select titles, available exclusively through their online store. Season 5 was re-released on April 11, 2017. Season 6 was re-released on July 18, 2017.

In Region 4, Madman Entertainment has released the first two seasons on DVD in Australia.

DVD name	Ep#	Release date
Season One	26	April 1, 2008
Season Two	37	November 11, 2008
Season Three	37	June 9, 2009
Season Four	33	March 23, 2010
Season Five	38	August 17, 2010†; April 11, 2017 (re-release)
Season Six	32	April 19, 2011†; July 18, 2017 (re-release)

† – Shout! Factory Exclusives title, sold exclusively through Shout's online store

== Homages ==
- In a September 2010 episode of the CBS daytime television series The Young and the Restless, newlyweds Billy and Victoria Abbott (portrayed by Billy Miller and Amelia Heinle, respectively) buy a house (exterior located on old Columbia Movie Ranch that was actually used in Father Knows Best and I Dream of Jeannie) that replicates the interior of the Anderson home on a sound stage. They watch Father Knows Best on DVD and often call each other "Jim" and "Margaret." At her wedding, which takes place in the house, Victoria chooses a 1950s-style white dress. Judge Anderson, the minister who marries the couple, was played by Donahue.
- The town of Springfield in The Simpsons is named after the Springfield in Father Knows Best.

== Nielsen ratings ==
The series finished in the Nielsen ratings at No. 25 for the 1957–1958 season, No. 14 for 1958–1959 and No. 6 for 1959–1960.

== Syndication ==
Father Knows Best aired in the 1980s on Superstation WTBS and from 1986 to 1993 on The Family Channel. The show also aired on TV Land from 1998 to 1999 and 2002–2004. Reruns of Father Knows Best have aired on Antenna TV as part of that channel's regular programming schedule from January 3, 2011 to December 31, 2025, and it also aired weekday afternoons on digital subchannel ME-TOO in Chicago. Father Knows Best previously broadcast weekday mornings on FETV, GAC Family (now Great American Family) and GAC Living (now Great American Living). It is also available for free streaming on the Vudu and Amazon Prime Video services.

== Film adaptation ==
In March 1994, Larry McMurtry and Diana Ossana were developing a dramatic adaptation of Father Knows Best for Universal Pictures. In July 2000, it was reported Paramount Pictures and Nickelodeon Movies were developing a new adaptation of the series that would be more light-hearted in comparison to McMurtry and Ossana's attempt. The plot for the project involving a child entering his father in a "father of the year" contest which the father would discover he won because his son lied about several aspects on the application. The father would initially be determined to tell the truth, until he falls in love with the woman officiating the contest forcing him to adhere to his son's lies and play the role of the "perfect father". Bob Hilgenberg and Rob Muir had written the draft as a possible vehicle for Tim Allen.
