= Imaging Blackness =

Conceptualization of Black people in media

Imaging Blackness is the complex process of expressing, recognizing, or assigning specific ideas or values in the depiction of Black people. This depiction can appear in various forms of media: film, television, and literature. More specifically, in film, Black people have been imaged and captured since the medium's dawn.

== Origin of term ==
"Imaging Blackness" is a term Audrey T. McCluskey first used in her 2007 book Imaging Blackness: Race and Racial Representation in Film Poster Art.

== Historical overview ==
From the beginning of modern cinema, images of African Americans have played a central role in the West's cinematic imagination. These negative images have promoted a demeaning and undignified image of African Americans as a general group. However, simultaneously, film has enabled African Americans to convey their creativity and originality, despite some intentions of White people to confine Black humanity or use the African American race as a scapegoat.

The beginning of Black presence in American film started with the concept of "blackface". Instead of hiring Black actors to play Black characters, White actors would paint their faces black and accentuate their lips by covering them with bright red lipstick. Their outer appearance reflected White society's curiosity around Blackness. The concept of Blackness was initially used to ridicule African Americans, showing an imagined White superiority to Black people, but over time society became attracted to the controversial concept. Consequently, blackface became a popular fad in American culture.

== Poster art ==
In the 1890s a new form of visual representation was introduced to American and international audiences. The high literacy rate at the beginning of the twentieth century caused the creation of advertising for newly animated films. Early advertising took the form of vividly colored crates or switchboards used to promote an upcoming film. Seen as a way to preview a story with visual highlights, these advertisements enticed viewers and attracted audiences to movie theatres. This concept gave rise to the modern-day movie poster. The invention of the movie poster itself is attributed to a Frenchman named Jules Chéret. He used a printing process called stone lithography to create his posters. As film technology progressed, the need for more movie posters grew, and the format became standardized to promote every new movie. The General Film Company standardized the film poster size at 27 x 41, allowing it to fit within the glass casing outside theatres. This was called the "one sheet" poster. These posters included texts and images supplied by the movie production company. A constant dispute among associates in the production company was whether to showcase star actors on their movie posters. The producer's objective was to sell the movie through advertising. On the other hand, the stars demanded that the posters reflect them and their talents. Movie studios hired illustrators to create artistic, inventive posters, constantly seeking ways to appeal to the widest audience. During the pre-television era of the 1950s, poster art became the typical medium for movie advertising, featuring a desirable image of a movie star alongside text or other images that explained part of the movie's story.

The portrayal of Black Americans on these movie posters was very different from that of White Americans. American posters tended to marginalize Black presence and limit romantic images between African Americans. However, foreign posters showcased African Americans more and highlighted their romantic roles.

Early American films focused on racial imagery. Some films made for Black audiences by White producers exhibited extreme racial stereotypes and caricatures. The "hero" of these films was often a White male of upper-class status. For instance, a poster for the Norman Studio-produced film Regeneration (1923) previewed the movie but also reflected a societal stereotype. It showed a light-skinned White woman fearing the advance of an intimidating dark-skinned man. This implied the threat of rape, which negatively portrayed the African-American man as an inherently malicious and predatory individual. These posters spoke to and perpetuated a social fear of Black people among White communities, and specifically a fear of Black male sexuality encroaching on the imagined purity of White women, and this dynamic and stereotype (sometimes referred to as "Mandingo") would continue on in various forms into the 21st century.

Yet some studios created posters to counter negative images of African Americans. Some showed Black men as hardworking, which was atypical of Hollywood's defined image of the African-American male.

In later decades, poster images reflected social issues presented by "message films". "These included 'passing' in Lost Boundaries (1949), interracial romance in Island in the Sun (1957), and Jungle Fever (1991), and the youthful experience of racial prejudice in The Learning Tree (1969)." These images differed from earlier negative portrayals of African Americans. The new representation of African Americans on film posters showed social, controversial figures, which created an inquisitive, yet uncomfortable society. By the 1960s, during the Civil Rights Movement, the first African-American Hollywood movie star, Sidney Poitier, emerged. The inoffensive posters of his movies, such as Lilies of the Field (1963), depicted him as harmless and, further, as a protector of others. Thereafter, White society became more accepting to non-violent, optimistic images of African Americans.

During Spike Lee's filmmaking career, topics such as race and sex were presented provocatively in poster art. He wanted the posters to be as "racy" as his films. He hired graphic artists such as Art Sims, who specialized in specifically marketing Black films. Among controversial posters he created was the film poster of Jungle Fever, a 1991 movie about an interracial love affair. The first version of the poster had the actors Wesley Snipes and Annabella Sciorra sucking each other's fingers. This image was rejected because it was seen as too sexual and was replaced by the image of the couple interlocking fingers while holding hands. Another Lee film, Bamboozled, was promoted with a poster of a graphical satire. When the film was released in 2000, many newspapers, including The New York Times, rejected the advertising as too offensive. Ironically, the film itself exposes and retells the history of African-American treatment and portrayal in American entertainment.

"Film posters illustrate the artistic and thematic range of racial representation in the American film industry. They present a history that is preserved and partially documented by a clash of art and commerce. As such, these posters are imbued with a broad array of social meanings that continue to engage us."

== Action/crime ==
The 1970s began with a revolutionary representation of African Americans. Beginning with Melvin Van Peebles's film Sweet Sweetback's Baadasssss Song (1971), in which a Black man fights back against racial injustice, Hollywood began portraying powerful Black men as heroes in action films. The Flying Ace (1926) claimed the title as the "greatest airline thriller ever filmed". It inspired many African-American aviators to fly and form aviation clubs. Odds Against Tomorrow (1959) is noted as one of the last film noirs and was directed by Robert Wise. It is one of the first films to address White racism towards African Americans.

Regardless, some Black action films also created controversy because they were based on negative stereotypical representations of African Americans. African American actors were primarily directed by Whites, so their characters usually appeared and acted in the stereotypical ways in which Whites viewed African Americans.

== Comedy ==
Comedy has helped advance the careers of individual African Americans, while also often mocking their demeanor or appearance. In the American tradition of minstrelsy, White men painted their faces and falsely portrayed African-American culture. "Black people and black life was the joke." The White stage performers suggested their superiority over African Americans by using minstrel shows as a daily mockery of their former position in society. Even the representation of African-American children as pickaninnies became the humor for White audiences. Because of the subjugation of African Americans through comic films, comedy became an extremely sensitive topic, especially for independent race films intended for Black audiences. There was much confusion on how to provide a comic performance for the audience while not ridiculing the African-American race. In the 1930s, African-American film directors produced comedy films of the same context; however. They mocked African Americans and because of this their black audiences diminished. Frustrated, race filmmakers sought to create a more complex character for African Americans and wanted to positively portray African-American culture. Comedy films became one way African Americans entered the movie industry, even though their early performances were degrading. Yet, some African Americans overshadowed and outperformed white actors, showing new talent on stage. Early independent Black comedy films popular among African Americans told stories about Black life and culture, revealing the aptitude of Black comedians. In the late 1900s, Black comedies thrived and became especially popular. Bill Cosby and Sidney Poitier became a comic duo in Uptown Saturday Night (1974), attracting Black audiences from across the country. Richard Pryor: Live in Concert (1979), starring Richard Pryor, who became the most popular African American comedian in Hollywood, changed the industry. He set the path for other African-American comedians such as modern-day Eddie Murphy, The Wayans Brothers, Martin Lawrence, Chris Rock, Chris Tucker, and Bernie Mac.

== Documentary ==
Only in the late 1900s did African-American life in the United States become a topic of interest to White society. Documentary films gave African Americans a chance to voice their opinions about the injustices they felt. These films also showed detailed insight to African American lives that were not known to society. William Greaves became a famous filmmaker after his television documentary on the lives of African Americans in the United States, called Black Journal. His other documentaries on prominent figures like Booker T. Washington and Malcolm X show how documentaries can serve as historical sources. Greaves intended to capture the struggles and triumphs of African Americans through a realistic approach. His view filled a void in Hollywood's representation of African Americans. He concentrated on issues specific to African-American communities, such as gender differences, racial hierarchies, and family relationships. Documentaries were used as a powerful method to portray African Americans as complex individuals, explaining significant events in their lives.

== Drama ==
The "separate cinema" of race films directed for Black audiences used the drama genre to combat the popular, accepted view of African Americans. The Lincoln Motion Picture Company, established in 1915, was the first Black film company to produce films that portrayed positive qualities in their depictions of African-American life. African-American filmmakers used dramatic works to uplift Black morale, inspire African Americans and represent Black life in an encouraging way. In earlier dramatic films in Hollywood, African-American characters would commonly be seen as being disposable to whites. They would either have to sacrifice their lives or their families for the triumph or success of Whites. The underlying message told by Hollywood was the importance and dominance of white life over the lives of African Americans. However, in the 1900s, independent films including Daughters of the Dust (1991), Beloved (1998), and Bamboozled (2000) showed the history of African Americans in the United States, the challenges they faced, and the benefits they gained from overcoming racial injustice. These films show how dramatic films can serve as a tool for African Americans to envision and hope for a better future.

== Musical ==
"Several cultural critics claim that, in U.S. culture, music is one of the few arenas within blacks are allowed greatness. This phenomenon is clearly evident in the inception of the all-black cast musical in the Hollywood film tradition, in musicals in race films from the late 1920s and 1930s, and in contemporary culture". The earliest sound films, Hearts of Dixie (1929) and Hallelujah! (1929) allowed African Americans to perform and showcase their supposed "natural abilities" for song and dance. Unlike earlier Hollywood musicals in which Whites performed in blackface, these musicals featured all-Black casts playing Black roles. Hollywood studios constructed all-Black cast musicals designed for White audiences. Even though these films confirmed society's belief of the Negro as the bottom of the social hierarchy, musicals gave African Americans an opportunity to add to the limited role of "Blackness" labeled by whites.

In Hollywood musicals, African Americans were prominently used for white amusement. Even all-Black cast musicals were intended for white audiences. Contrasting the "separate cinema", where race films were shown to Black audiences throughout the South. These films developed a narrative that demonstrated the strengths of African-American performers. These race films also provided African Americans with the opportunity to play lead roles rather than the limited Hollywood roles of servants, maids, or clowns. The existence of the musical genre in both Hollywood and race films generated a segregated society. This segregation allowed audiences to see the discrepancies between Hollywood and independent race films.

== Mystery/thriller ==
"Mystery/thriller films allowed both black- and white-owned race film production companies the opportunity to showcase a wide range of black characters in roles such as doctors, attorneys, judges, bankers, and policemen, depictions that went against the grain of the limited roles mainstream Hollywood films afforded black characters". Black characters were able to transform their mediocre roles as a "spooked servant" into central elements of the film. For instance, in the 1940s, Stepin Fetchit and Mantan Moreland played unforgettable roles in the Charlie Chan mysteries, and their characters even became more popular than Chan himself. Contemporary mystery/thriller films cast African Americans like Eddie Murphy, Morgan Freeman, and Denzel Washington in leading roles.

== Western ==
During the early 1900s, Western movies became Hollywood's most popular genre. Herb Jeffries noticed the interest in and appeal of white singing cowboys on screen and the lack of African Americans cast in those roles. This is despite the fact that about one-third of all cowboys that settled in the West were African Americans. These cowboys escaped slavery and were often offered safe houses with various Native American tribes. The first Black cowboy, Jeff Kincaid, made his first film appearance in Harlem on the Prairie (1937). Despite segregation laws, the film was nationally distributed to both Black and white theatres across the country. Its success inspired many similar films and improved perceptions of African Americans in broader society. In the film The Bronze Buckaroo (1939), the first Black Western full-length musical, the African-American cowboy acts as the lead hero, saving the damsel in distress and then slowly riding off into the sunset.

== Blaxploitation ==
"An examination of Black action films produced both independently by African Americans and by major Hollywood studios during the Black film explosion of the 1960s and 1970s raises important questions about the African-American film experience of visuality and identity formation, and the ways in which the look and the gaze of the African American are inextricably linked to a culture of oppression". Experts claimed that films could link youth fantasies to visual depictions on film because of the lack of nationalistic culture in society. The African-American audience often struggled to separate their existence from the visual imagination shown in Hollywood films. Adult audiences and older adolescents from middle-class families could view films in the intended fictional context. Coming from comfortable homes where their needs were met, they regarded films as mere fiction. In contrast, poor African Americans were susceptible to idolizing Hollywood films. The low-income adolescents who did not have a comfortable lifestyle or positive role-models viewed fictional films as reality. Discussions of the "Blaxploitation" films include "assumptions about the relation of an African American spectatorship to Hollywood in general often rely on the notion that Black spectatorship is either degraded, infantile, or polluted by the outside forces to which it is subjugated". Blaxploitation films provided a counter-narrative to the idea of white supremacy and the traditional portrayals of African Americans in Hollywood cinema. The Blaxploitation narrative of "ghetto despair" illustrated African Americans' response to the Black Power era. In addition, Blaxploitation films introduced and developed a concept of masculinity that Hollywood films lacked. Hollywood films had a wide-ranging view of males from "the placid, asexual Sidney Poitier model to the plantation Sambo or the comical Stepin Fetchit". Blaxploitation films' depiction of the destructive inner-city lives of African Americans and the hyper-masculine male character both countered and enforced the growing urban African American criminality of the 1960s. The release of the movie Shaft (1971) featured an African-American detective who used his Harlem street smarts to help him win a war waged against a street mob. The director, Gordon Parks, cast an African American in the lead, authoritative role. He also employed many African Americans, giving them roles from screenwriter to extras. Including African Americans in the film and during the filmmaking process added a more realistic urban feel. Including African Americans in filmmaking made a notable impact and set the precedent for future directors. The genre of Blaxploitation affected Hollywood's vision of African Americans as well as the existing political hierarchy in which they were placed in the United States. The rise of Blaxploitation films helped define African Americans in the post-Civil Rights era in the United States.

By creating the Blaxploitation genre, audiences could see new representations of Black Power. Since the majority of African-American movie-goers were adolescents, it was determined that horror and action movies sold best to these "ethnic" audiences. Between 1966 and 1975, around seventy Black action films were made either by Hollywood studios or first-time African-American production companies. These action films varied in quality, ranging from creative narratives to low-budget productions. Because African Americans became a focus of mainstream entertainment in the 1960s and 1970s, the Blaxploitation era created a visual tradition that challenged the historical stigma surrounding African Americans. These films also revealed the limitations and lack of opportunities African Americans were given in society during the post-segregation period.

However, critics such as Clayton Riley from The New York Times argued that Blaxploitation films provided an overly simplistic view of African Americans, which could have had detrimental effects, potentially making African Americans more submissive to societal injustice.

== See also ==
- African-American culture

== Bibliography ==
- Kisch, John, and Edward Mapp. A Separate Cinema: Fifty Years of Black-cast Posters. New York: Farrar, Straus, and Giroux, 1992. Print.
- Locke, Brian. Racial Stigma on the Hollywood Screen from World War II to the Present: the Orientalist Buddy Film. New York, NY: Palgrave Macmillan, 2009. Print.
- McCluskey, Audrey T. Imaging Blackness: Race and Racial Representation in Film Poster Art. Bloomington: Indiana University Press, 2007. Print.
- Ongiri, Amy Abugo. Spectacular Blackness: The Cultural Politics of the Black Power Movement and the Search for a Black Aesthetic. Charlottesville: University of Virginia, 2010. Print.
