= Murray's Dude Ranch =

Former Black-owned dude ranch

Coordinates: 34.5573°N 117.2074°W

Murray's Dude Ranch, Apple Valley, California

Murray's Ranch, sometimes called the Overall Wearing Dude Ranch, was a guest ranch in Bell Mountain, California from the 1920s until the 1960s. The ranch was located at the northwest corner of Waalew Road and Dale Evans Parkway in Apple Valley, just outside the city limits of Victorville. It was owned by African Americans and catered primarily to an African American clientele. It also served as the set for a number of "all-black cast" western movies including groundbreaking Western musical Harlem on the Prairie (1937).

== History ==
The 40-acre (160,000 m^{2}) site was purchased for $100 in 1926. The ranch was founded by husband and wife Nolie B. and Lela Murray, both of whom ran successful businesses in Los Angeles, California, and were prominent members of the city's Black community. The Murrays ran the ranch in part as a retreat for underprivileged African-American children. Operated for nearly 20 years as a dude ranch with a pool, several small houses, tennis courts, a ball field, and riding stables, the ranch was used by entertainment personalities and by ordinary families. It was open to all who could afford to come. Murray's was a recreational favorite for Blacks, and a marker in the history of Black recreation. In the 1920s, when Murray's Dude Ranch opened, widespread segregation practices limited Black Californians' access to most private and public recreational facilities. Resorts, hotels, nightclubs, and even public parks in many California communities were closed to Black patrons. For nearly half of the 20th century, recreational activities of the Black community were carried out in separate facilities. Apple Valley was once well known for the guest ranches that flourished there from about World War I to the mid-1950s. Black-owned resorts were established in the first two decades of the 20th century, including Lake Elsinore in Riverside County, and Val Verde in Los Angeles County.

Films shot on location at Murray's Dude Ranch were four "all-black cast" westerns, starring Herbert Jeffries as a black singing cowboy, made in the late 1930s. Harlem on the Prairie (1937), Two-Gun Man from Harlem (1938), The Bronze Buckaroo (1939), and Harlem Rides the Range (1939) featured songs by Jefferies and the Four Tones, his backing vocal group.

Murray's hosted about 100 people each week during the height of the season, from May to September. The visitors from this period included Lena Horne, Kate Smith, Joe Louis, Hedda Hopper, Freddie Bartholomew, Hattie McDaniel, Clark Gable and Louise Beavers. In 1955, thirty-five acres of the forty acre ranch were purchased for $65,000 by one of the most famous black celebrities of all, the world-renowned singer and actress Pearl Bailey, who for nearly a decade spent her days as an Apple Valley housewife when she could get away from the demands of her career in films and entertainment. Bailey and her husband, Louie Bellson, renamed the property the "Lazy B" and installed modern conveniences like a telephone and updated lighting. Nolie Murray continued to reside on the remaining 5 acres of the original ranch, operating a small hotel, until his death in 1958. Bailey sold the ranch in the mid-1960s. In 1988 the old buildings, not worth salvaging, were burned for a training session of the Apple Valley Fire Department.

== See also ==
- African American resorts
