= Lela Murray =

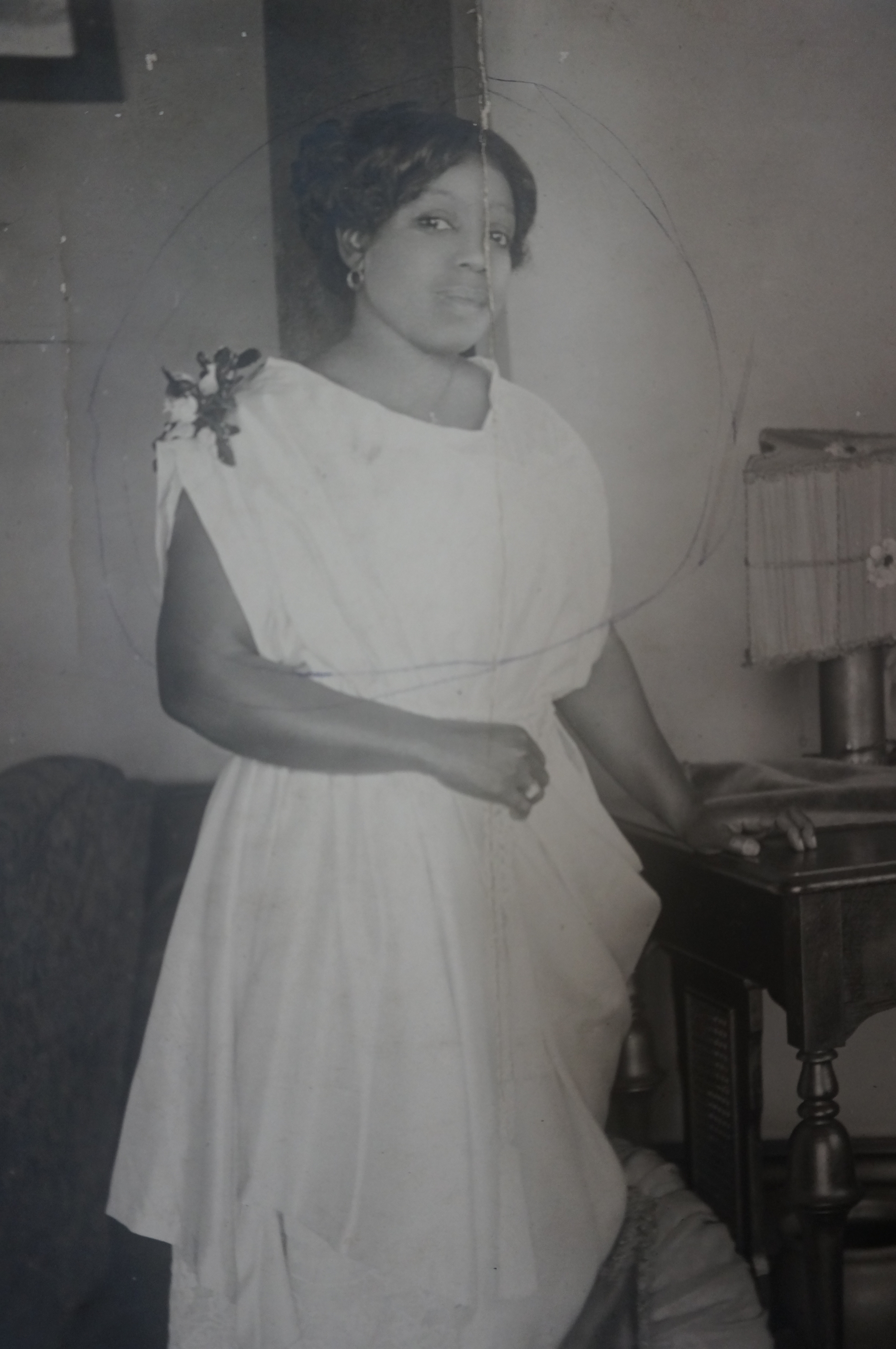
- Born: Lela Campbell; June 12, 1887; Hopkinsville, Kentucky
- Died: March 18, 1949 (aged 61); Bell Mountain, California
- Spouse: Nolie B. Murray

Lela Murray (June 12, 1887 – March 18, 1949) was a prominent black businesswoman, community leader, and advocate for civil rights in Los Angeles during the first half of the 20th century. She co-founded Murray's Ranch, billed by the press as "the only Negro dude ranch in the world," in Bell Mountain, California, providing a place of recreation and leisure to people of color during a period of racial segregation and anti-black sentiment in the United States.

== Early life ==
Lela Murray (Campbell) was born in 1887 in Hopkinsville, Kentucky. She was the daughter of Isaac Newton and Susie Campbell, freed slaves who became teachers in Christian County's segregated schools. Isaac Newton would go on to be elected Kentucky's first black magistrate, but after charges of fraud fueled by racism in the region, would relocate his family to Kansas.

In 1894, Lela moved with her family to San Diego, California, where she experienced multiple family tragedies. Her father suffered a stroke that left him partially paralyzed and prone to mood swings. He began to drink heavily. Her brother contracted pneumonia and died on Christmas morning of 1903. Later, in the midst of a bitter divorce, Isaac Newton murdered his wife Susie in front of his two daughters. Isaac Newton was sent to prison and died seven years later in the San Quentin penitentiary.

Following the murder of their mother, Lela and her sister, Vivian, went to live with distant relatives in Utah. The sisters later returned to California, settling in Los Angeles. Lela thrived in Los Angeles, becoming an active member of Philips Temple CME Church, volunteering for the black Y.W.C.A., and supporting many clubs and organizations devoted to the advancement of black Angelenos. In 1913, she married Nolie Murray, an up-and-coming businessman in the Los Angeles black community.

== Murray’s Ranch ==
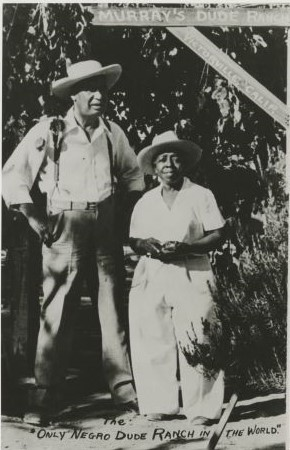
Nolie and Lela Murray at Murray's Ranch.

By the 1920s, Nolie and Lela Murray were both successful Los Angeles business owners. Nolie was the co-proprietor of a bail-bond business, and Lela owned a popular clothing and dry goods store. Concerns for Lela's developing respiratory complaints, however, caused them to consider establishing a homestead in the desert. They turned their attention to Bell Mountain, a black homesteading community near Victorville, California, where years ago, in 1915, they had filed a previous claim but had been unable to prove up due to business obligations in the city.

In 1928, they purchased 40 acres of land from Robert and Mary Cook at Bell Mountain, where they established Murray's Ranch. In 1937, after years of entertaining friends on the property, Lela and Nolie opened the ranch to the public. It was advertised as the first and “only dude ranch owned and operated by Negroes in America”, and was billed by the press as "the only negro dude ranch in the world". The ranch was consistently featured in the Los Angeles newspaper, California Eagle, the editor of which, Charlotta Bass, was a close friend of Lela's and often stayed at the ranch.

Murray's Ranch was opened in an era when similar white-only dude ranches were becoming popular throughout the desert surrounding Los Angeles. Murray's Ranch allowed middle and upper class African Americans access to the same style of recreation as their white counterparts in a time of increasing segregation and Jim Crow law. Activities hosted at the ranch included riding, hunting, golfing, swimming in a modern pool, or just dressing up and “playing cowboy.” Lela herself was noted to have given up her city clothes in favor of western wear while on the ranch, including a ten-gallon hat.

The ranch was visited by the elites of Los Angeles’ black community, including celebrities like Lena Horne, Joe Louis, and Herb Jeffries, the latter of whom starred in movies shot on location at Murray's Ranch. Lela also hosted Easter Sunrise services attended by members of Los Angeles’ most influential black churches. As an active member of the Bell Mountain Improvement Association, Lela supported the modernization of the community's roads and infrastructure as well as the construction of Bell Mountain's new community center. During World War II, in response to the fact that the USO club in Victorville accepted only white soldiers, Lela presented Murray's Ranch as an alternative USO club for servicemen of all races. The ranch was the only place in all of Victorville where visiting family members of black servicemen could find accommodations.

== Death ==
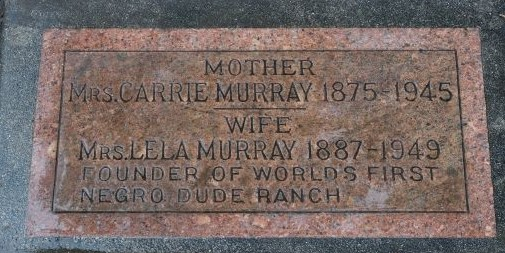
Lela Murray's Grave Marker at Evergreen Cemetery in Los Angeles

After two years of declining health, Lela Murray was admitted to San Bernardino hospital and died on March 18, 1949. Her life was honored with two memorial services – one in Victorville and one in Los Angeles. In her eulogy, Reverend Orene Phelps compared Mrs. Murray to “a desert flower” – something beautiful and unexpected that had somehow managed to flourish in a hard, dry land. Lela Murray's body lies at Evergreen Cemetery in Los Angeles, California.
