= Consuelo Harris =

American actress and dancer (1910–2000)

- Born: Consuela Harris; 11 January 1910; Washington, D.C., U.S.
- Died: 28 May 2000 (aged 90); Teaneck, New Jersey, U.S.
- Other names: Queen of the Nightclub; Connie Harris
- Occupations: Actress; dancer
- Years active: 1930–1943
- Spouse(s): Eddie Barefield (m. 1938; died 1991) Alfred G. Lowery (m. 1921, divorced)
- Children: 2

Consuelo Harris (also spelled Consuela Harris and credited professionally as Connie Harris; January 11, 1910 – May 28, 2000) was an American actress and dancer in the Swing Era of the 1930s. Billed in contemporary entertainment press as the "Queen of the Nightclub", she was known for her work as a specialty "shake" and "snake" dancer on both the East and West Coasts, performing at venues such as the Cotton Club in Harlem and Sebastian's Cotton Club in Culver City, California.

In addition to her stage and cabaret work, Harris appeared in approximately 35 Hollywood and independent films before retiring from the screen in 1943. She is best remembered on film for her featured dance routines in director Oscar Micheaux's race films Swing! (1938), God's Step Children (1938), and Birthright (1939), as well as her acting role as Carolina Clayburn in the musical Western Harlem on the Prairie (1937).

== Early life ==
Consuelo was born on January 11, 1910, in Washington, D.C.. She was of African American and Native American descent and grew up alongside her brother, Maceo Yulan.

== Career ==
=== Nightclub and stage work ===
During the 1930s, Harris established herself as a prominent solo dancer and "chorine" (chorus and specialty performer) in New York nightclubs and musical revues. Contemporary newspaper accounts and dance historians noted her flexibility, rhythmic footwork, and theatrical storytelling style, which distinguished her from conventional chorus dancers of the period.

Harris specialized in "shake" dancing and the "snake dance"—a vernacular jazz style characterized by undulating torso isolations and spinal flexibility. She headlined at major venues in New York, including Harlem's Cotton Club, and later became a featured attraction on the West Coast at Sebastian's Cotton Club in Culver City, California. Throughout her cabaret career, she appeared on bills alongside leading Swing Era bandleaders and musicians, including Duke Ellington, Louis Armstrong, and Andy Kirk.

=== Film ===
Harris appeared in roughly 35 motion pictures during the 1930s, including 23 productions directed by Cecil B. DeMille. Much of her early work in mainstream Hollywood studio releases consisted of appearances in dance ensembles and musical numbers, including The Sign of the Cross (1932), Devil and the Deep (1932), You Can't Have Everything (1937), New Faces of 1937 (1937), and Vogues of 1938 (1937).

In 1937, billed as Connie Harris, she appeared in a credited acting role as Carolina Clayburn in Sam Newfield's Harlem on the Prairie, starring Herb Jeffries.

Harris's most well known screen appearances were in independent race films directed by Oscar Micheaux. In 1938, she performed a solo routine to an arrangement of "Bugle Call Rag" in Micheaux's Swing! and an improvisational routine accompanied by the Leon Gross Orchestra playing Duke Ellington's "Mood Indigo" in God's Step Children. She also appeared in a dance sequence in Micheaux's Birthright (1939). Her surviving routines in Micheaux's films remain key visual records of 1930s vernacular jazz and cabaret dance styles.

Harris retired from acting and dancing around 1943 to focus on her family.

== Personal life ==
On June 9, 1927, Harris married Alfred G. Lowery in New York. They had one daughter, Dolores Consuelo Jackson, before divorcing.

Harris later married jazz saxophonist, clarinetist, and arranger Eddie Barefield, who performed and arranged for Duke Ellington, Cab Calloway, Ella Fitzgerald, and Benny Goodman. They had one daughter, Patricia Poindexter. Harris and Barefield resided in the Bronx, New York, for decades until Barefield's death in January 1991. Her grandson, Rod Daniels, also worked as an actor, appearing in a 1995 episode of the television series Homicide: Life on the Street.

== Death ==
Following her husband's death, Harris relocated to New Jersey and she died on May 28, 2000, in Teaneck, New Jersey at the age of 90.

== Filmography ==
=== Film ===
Year	Title	Role	Notes
1932	The Sign of the Cross	Dancer	
1932	Devil and the Deep	Dancer	
1937	You Can't Have Everything	Dancer	
1937	New Faces of 1937	Dancer in Peckin' Number	
1937	Vogues of 1938	Dancer	
1937	Harlem on the Prairie	Carolina Clayburn	Credited as Connie Harris
1938	Swing!	Miss Harris	Performs to "Bugle Call Rag"
1938	God's Step Children	Musical Dancer	Performs to "Mood Indigo"
1938	Birthright	Dancer	
