= Artie Young =

American actress (c. 1915–1989)

- Born: Artie Francis Young; February 24, 1915; Pasadena, California, U.S.
- Died: July 30, 1989
- Other names: Artie Brandon, Artie Brandon Reed, Artie Brandon Young Reed, Artie Young Davis, Artie Davis
- Spouse(s): Eddie Brandon (divorced), Leonard Reed (divorced)

Artie Francis Young (February 24, 1915 – July 30, 1989) was an African-American dancer, and actress of theater and film in the 1930s and 1940s. Her film work includes soundies. Young was considered one of the prettiest girls from Harlem in the 1940s. She went by many name variations, including Artie Brandon, Artie Brandon Young Reed, and Artie Young Davis.

== Biography ==
Artie Francis Young was born in c. 1916 in Pasadena, California.

The beginning of 1939 saw Young performing as the primary female interest in two films alongside the lead Herb Jeffries, Harlem Rides the Range and The Bronze Buckaroo. While performing with the Swing Mikado company in August of 1939, Young and her fellow performers were denied service at a cocktail lounge in Los Angeles due to being African American. Her group filed a lawsuit against the cocktail lounge location and the suit was settled in October of 1940. She was a cast member and dancer in Duke Ellington's revue Jump For Joy (1941), a socially significant show for its outspokenness on racial matters of the time.

By 1945, Young had temporarily stopped performing in theatre and was working as a checkroom attendant at the nightclub Shepp's Playhouse in the Bronzeville neighborhood of Los Angeles (now Little Tokyo). In May 1946, she was in "Don't Go Home Yet" and was dance partners with Foster Johnson, they performed at the Finale Club in San Francisco. By July 1946, Young was back in New York City performing in "Zanzibar".

== Theater ==
- The Mikado - In Swing (1939)
- Jump for Joy (1941)
- Zanzibar (1946)

== Filmography ==
- Life Goes On (1938) as Alice
- Harlem Rides the Range (1939)
- The Bronze Buckaroo (1939)
- The Walls Keep Talking (1942), a soundie
- Cabin in the Sky (1943)
- Stormy Weather (1943)

== Personal life ==
Young was married to fellow actor Eddie Brandon, though she filed for divorce against her husband in September of 1938 for "cruelty and incompatibility". She remarried in August of 1943 to producer Leonard Reed, though she filed for divorce against Reed in August of 1945 citing "mental cruelty".
