= Harlem Rides the Range =

1939 American Western race film

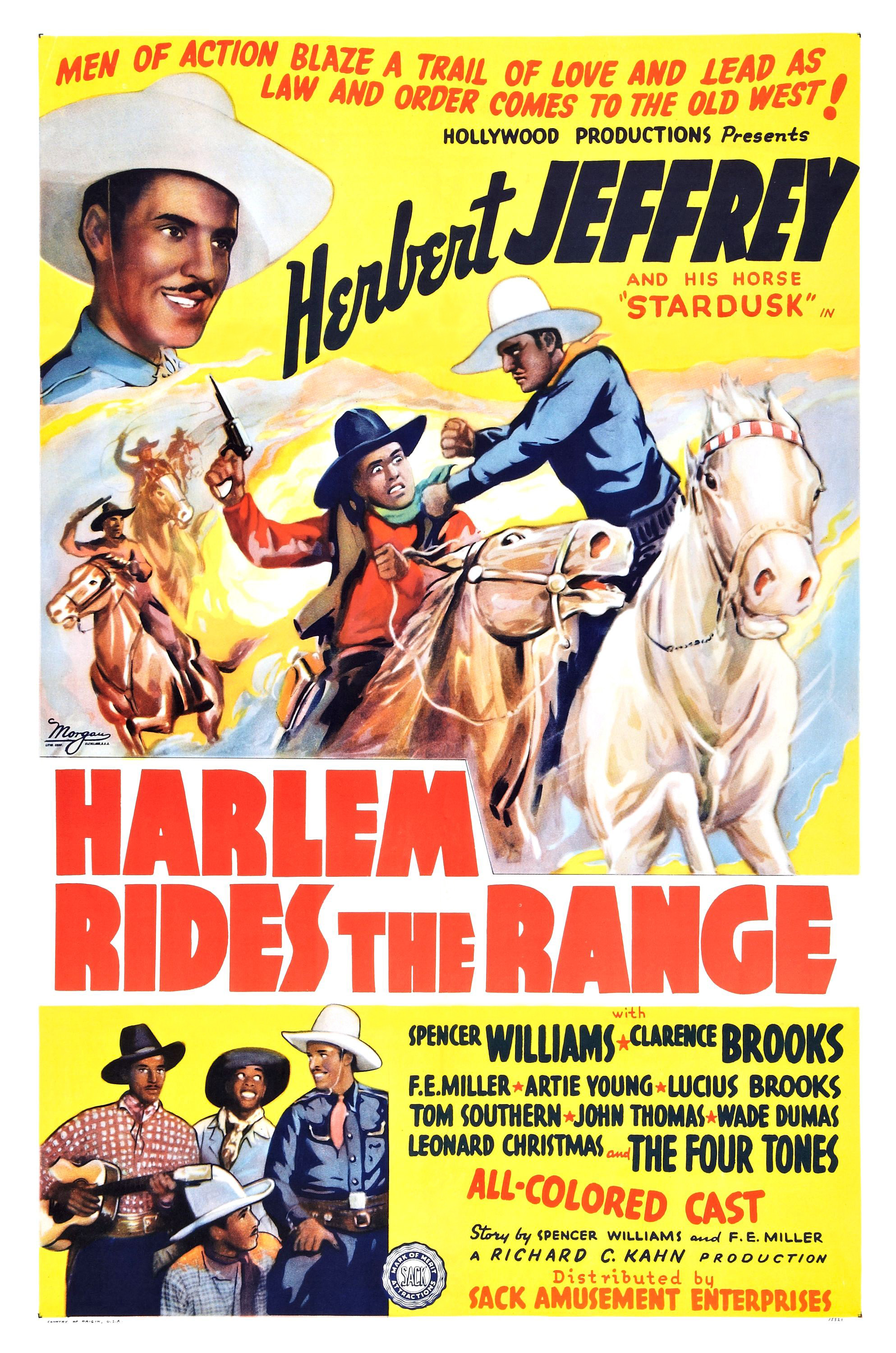
- Film poster
- Directed by: Richard C. Kahn
- Screenplay by: F.E. Miller; Spencer Williams
- Story by: Spencer Williams
- Produced by: Richard C. Kahn; Alfred N. Sack
- Starring: Herbert Jeffries; Spencer Williams; Clarence Brooks
- Cinematography: Roland Price; Clark Ramsey
- Music by: Lew Porter
- Distributed by: Sack Amusement Enterprises
- Release date: February 1, 1939
- Running time: 56 minutes
- Country: United States
- Language: English

Harlem Rides the Range is a 1939 American Western race film directed by Richard C. Kahn. It followed the groundbreaking 1937 Western musical film Harlem on the Prairie.

== Plot ==
Bob Blake (Herb Jeffries) and his sidekick Dusty (Lucius Brooks) are two cowboys riding across the countryside in search of adventure. They come across a ranch where it appears a murder has taken place but they find the victim of the crime, Jim Dennison (Leonard Christmas), still alive. Dennison is hiding in fear of his life after what had taken place at the ranch. Bob sees a picture of the rancher's daughter Margaret (Artie Young) and falls in love at first sight; he cannot stop talking about how beautiful the girl in the picture is. Bob drops a glove when he leaves the ranch, which causes problems later.

The villain, Bradley (Clarence Brooks), wants to seize the ranch after terrorizing Dennison. Bob sets out to save Margaret and narrowly escapes a plot to frame him for the murder of one of the ranch foremen, Jim Connors (Tom Southern). Bradley uses Bob's dropped glove as part of the frameup. Bob is sent to jail, but is able to escape and tries to find Margaret. After a fight, Bob saves Margaret and they enjoy the romantic moment Bob had imagined when he first saw her picture. The ranch is saved; the story ends with Bob and Margaret together at last, and Bradley put in his place.

== Cast ==
- Herb Jeffries as Bob Blake
- Lucius Brooks as Dusty
- F.E. Miller as Slim Perkins the Cook
- Clarence Brooks as Bradley
- Spencer Williams as Mr. Watson
- Tom Southern as Jim Connors (Watson's foreman)
- Artie Young as Miss Margaret Dennison
- Leonard Christmas as Jim Dennison
- Wade Dumas as Dog City Sheriff
- John Thomas as Cactus, Watson Cowboy
- The Four Tones as Singing Group

== Set ==
Sets for all-black movies (especially Westerns) were difficult to come by; Harlem Rides the Range (and other Herb Jeffries films) were shot at the 40-acre (16 ha) Murray's Dude Ranch in Apple Valley, California. Originally established to give urban youth and their families the western experience, the ranch fell on hard times during the Great Depression and had become an interracial dude ranch which catered to film stars as well as ordinary families. The ranch's renewed popularity again enabled the Murrays to return to their original mission of helping inner city youth.

== Soundtrack ==
- Herb Jeffries and The Four Tones - "I'm a Happy Cowboy"
- Herb Jeffries and The Four Tones - "Prairie Flower"
