= Henry Norman =

Henry Norman may refer to:

- Sir Henry Norman, 1st Baronet (1858–1939), English journalist and Liberal politician
- Nigel Norman (Sir Henry Nigel St Valery Norman, 2nd Baronet, 1897–1943), consulting civil engineer and Royal Air Force officer
- Henry C. Norman (1850–1913), photographer based in Natchez, Mississippi, see Norman Studio
- Henry Norman (cricketer) (1801–1867), English cricketer
- Sir Henry Wylie Norman (1826–1904), Indian Army officer and colonial administrator
