= Walter Wanger's Vogues of 1938 =

Vogues of 1938
- Theatrical poster
- Directed by: Irving Cummings; Charles Kerr (assistant)
- Written by: Bella Spewack; Sam Spewack
- Produced by: Walter Wanger
- Starring: Warner Baxter; Joan Bennett
- Cinematography: Ray Rennahan
- Edited by: Otho Lovering; Dorothy Spencer
- Music by: Victor Young (uncredited)
- Production company: Walter Wanger Productions
- Distributed by: United Artists
- Release date: August 12, 1937 (Radio City Music Hall)
- Running time: 109 minutres
- Country: United States
- Language: English
- Budget: $1,048,435
- Box office: $1,089,956

Walter Wanger's Vogues of 1938 (also known by its shortened form, Vogues of 1938) is a 1937 musical comedy film produced by Walter Wanger and distributed by United Artists. It was directed by Irving Cummings, written by Bella and Sam Spewack, and starred Warner Baxter and Joan Bennett. It was filmed in New York City in Technicolor.

It was nominated for two Academy Awards for Best Art Direction (Alexander Toluboff), and Best Original Song (Sammy Fain (music) and Lew Brown (lyrics)) for the song That Old Feeling sung by Virginia Verrill.

== Plot ==
A successful fashion designer's life, beset at home by his shrewish wife and at work by his competitors, becomes even more complicated when one of his customers, a bride-to-be, jilts her wealthy husband and comes to him looking for a job—and possibly romance.

== Cast ==
- Warner Baxter as George Curson
- Joan Bennett as Wendy Van Klettering
- Helen Vinson as Mary Curson
- Mischa Auer as Prince Muratov
- Alan Mowbray as Henry Morgan
- Jerome Cowan as Mr. W. Brockton
- Alma Kruger as Sophie Miller
- Gonzalo Meroño as Richard Steward
- Consuelo Harris as Dancer
- Also, a young Penny Singleton, then known as Dorothy McNulty. Singleton went on to star in the series of "Blondie" movies and the voice of Jane in the "Jetsons" cartoons.

== Reception ==
The film reported an ultimate loss of $256,207.
