= Buzzy Rides the Range =

1940 film

- Directed by: Richard C. Kahn
- Written by: E.G. Robertson
- Produced by: Richard L'Estrange
- Starring: Robert 'Buzz' Henry; Dave O'Brien; Claire Rochelle
- Cinematography: Clark Ramsey
- Edited by: Adrian Weiss
- Music by: Bob Fite
- Production company: Ellkay Productions
- Distributed by: Arthur Ziehm Distributors
- Release date: December 30, 1940
- Running time: 60 minutes
- Country: United States
- Language: English

Buzzy Rides the Range is a 1940 American western film directed by Richard C. Kahn and starring Robert 'Buzz' Henry, Dave O'Brien and Claire Rochelle. It was produced as a second feature with shooting take place in studios in Phoenix, Arizona. It was rereleased in 1948 by Astor Pictures under the alternative title of Western Terror.

It was followed by a sequel Buzzy and the Phantom Pinto in 1941.

== Plot ==
After a spate of cattle rustling in the area Myra, the owner of the Harding ranch, sends for a Marshal's assistance. He decides to go undercover by posing as an injured gold prospector and with the help of her younger brother Buzz, he proves that the leader of the rustlers is in fact her neighboring ranch owners.

== Cast ==
- Robert 'Buzz' Henry as Buzzy Harding
- Dave O'Brien as Ken Blair
- Claire Rochelle as Myra Harding
- George Morrell as Dude Bates
- George Eldredge as Fred Ames
- Frank Merlo as Henchman Mesa
- Don Kelly as Henchman Deck
- Blue Rex as Rex, Buzzy's Horse
- Phil Arnold as Peewee - Ranchhand

== Bibliography ==
- Pitts, Michael R. Western Movies: A Guide to 5,105 Feature Films. McFarland, 2012.
