= Eddie Barefield =

American jazz saxophonist and clarinetist (1909–1991)

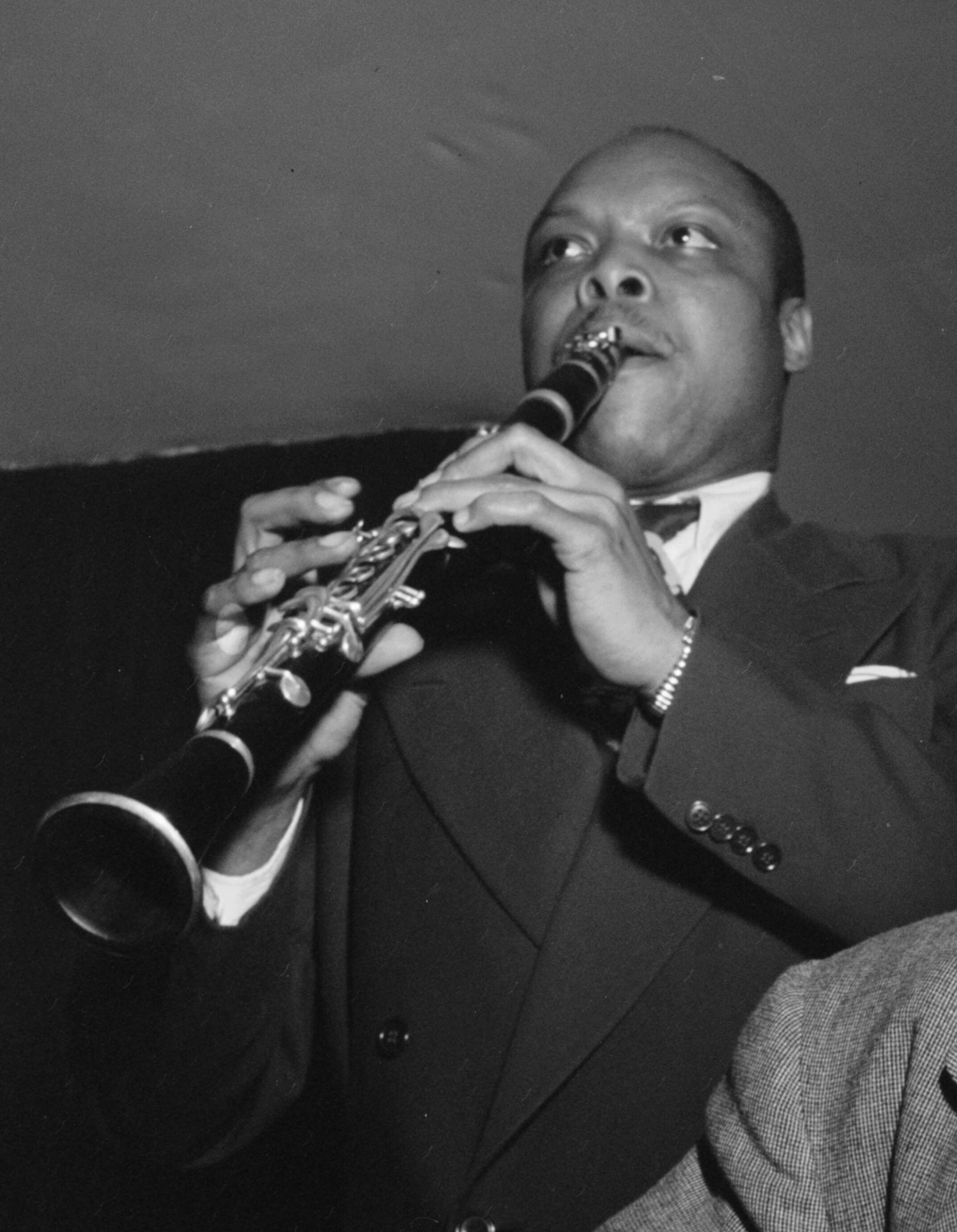
- Barefield c. 1947

Background information
- Born: Edward Emanuel Barefield; December 12, 1909; Scandia, Iowa, U.S.
- Died: January 4, 1991 (aged 81) New York City, U. S.
- Genre: Jazz
- Occupations: Musician, arranger, conductor
- Instruments: Saxophone, clarinet

Edward Emanuel Barefield (December 12, 1909 – January 4, 1991) was an American jazz saxophonist, clarinetist and arranger most noteworthy for his work with Louis Armstrong, Cab Calloway, Ella Fitzgerald, and Duke Ellington. Barefield's musical career included work as an arranger of the ABC Orchestra and for the "Endorsed by Dorsey: program on WOR. He also appeared in several films. He married performer Connie Harris.

== Biography ==
Barefield was born in Scandia, Iowa, on December 12, 1909. He grew up in Des Moines. His father was a coal miner, boxer, baseball player, and guitarist, and his mother was a pianist. Barefield began playing the saxophone at the age of twelve. His mother bought him the instrument as a Christmas gift, and he took it apart to see how it worked.

He started playing throughout the Midwest, and gained his first major big-band experience with the Bennie Moten orchestra of 1932 (which later metamorphosed into the Count Basie Orchestra). This opportunity led to work with Zach Whyte's band. When he was 24, he was offered a position in Cab Calloway's orchestra in 1933. Barefield arranged and wrote music for Calloway for over 40 years. Barfield conducted the orchestra for Ella Fitzgerald after Chick Webb died in 1939. In addition, Barefield performed with McKinney's Cotton Pickers, Les Hite, Fletcher Henderson, Don Redman, and Benny Carter.

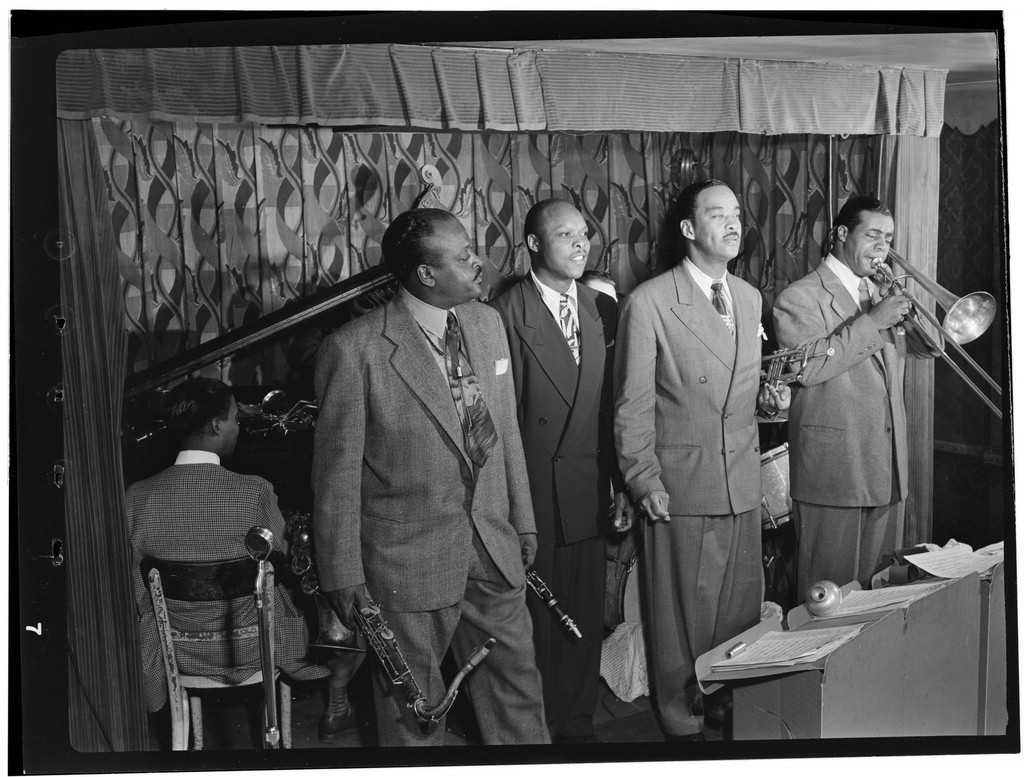
Ben Webster, Eddie Barefield, Buck Clayton, Benny Morton, Famous Door NYC, c. October 1947. Photography by William P. Gottlieb

After the era of big bands ended, Barefield continued to work by conducting shows, free-lancing, and playing in Europe at the jazz festival in Nice. Barefield was the musical director for the original Broadway production of Streetcar Named Desire in 1947. He spent a decade in the band of the Ringling Brothers and Barnum & Bailey Circus, and composed and arranged for Benny Goodman, Glenn Miller, Paul Whiteman, and Jimmy Dorsey. Later in his life, Barefield worked with the Illinois Jacquet big band.

Barefield also appeared in films, including Cab Calloway's Hi-De-Ho (1934), Al Jolson's The Singing Kid (1936), Every Day's a Holiday (1937), and The Night They Raided Minsky's (1968).

Barefield lived in the Bronx with his wife Connie Harris, a dancer who is in 35 films.

Barefield died of a heart attack at Mount Sinai Hospital in New York on January 4, 1991. He was survived by his wife and daughter, Patricia Poindexter.

== Discography ==
=== Albums ===
- 1974: Eddie Barefield (RCA)
- 1977: The Indestructible Eddie Barefield (Famous Door)
- 1982: Jazz (Comprehensive Video Supply Corporation)

==== Appearances ====
- 1971: L' Aventure Du Jazz – Musique Du Film (Jazz Odyssey)
- 1975: Swing Today Volume Three (RCA)

== See also ==
- List of Jazz Arrangers
