= Lucius Brooks =

American musician and actor

Lucius "Dusty" Holcey Brooks (1911–1999) was a musician, recording artist, and actor in American films. An African American, he portrayed a comedic sidekick in several Western films with African American casts. He performed as part of the Four Tones in several films. He also recorded numerous songs with the Four Tones.

In 1949, he recorded on Kangaroo Records.

He was a memberof the American Federation of Musicians.

== Discography ==
- "Play Jackpot" / "Thank You for the Lies" Memo
- "Tears And Wine" / "Heaven Or Fire" Dusty Brooks And His Tones, Sun records
- "Old Man River"

== Filmography ==
- Harlem on the Prairie (1937) as Musician (The Four Tones)
- Harlem Rides the Range (1939) as Rusty
- The Bronze Buckaroo (1939) as Dusty
- You'll Never Get Rich (1941) performing "Since I Kissed My Baby Goodbye" with the Four Tones and Fred Astaire
