= Richard C. Kahn =

American film director (1897–1960)

Richard C. Kahn (January 26, 1897 – January 28, 1960) was an American film director, screenwriter, and producer known for his B movies of the 1930s and early 1940s. Though white, he often worked with an all-black cast.

He was born in New Orleans, Louisiana. His feature films include Secret Menace (1931), The Third Sex (1934), Two-Gun Man from Harlem (1938), The Bronze Buckaroo (1939), Harlem Rides the Range (1939), Son of Ingagi (1940), Buzzy Rides the Range (1940), Buzzy and the Phantom Pinto (1941) and Guns Don't Argue (1957) (with Bill Karn). In 1955 he directed an episode of Grand Ole Opry, and in 1958 he directed two episodes of Sky King, "Rodeo Decathlon" and "The Brain and the Brawn".

He produced three Herbert Jeffrey films.

Kahn died in 1960 in Hollywood, California.

== Selected filmography ==
- Secret Menace (1931)
- Son of Ingagi (1940)
- Buzzy Rides the Range (1940)
- Buzzy and the Phantom Pinto (1941)
