= Bell Mountain, California =

Unincorporated community in California, United States

Coordinates: 34°37′27″N 117°12′25″W

Bell Mountain is an unincorporated community in the Victor Valley region of the Mojave Desert, within San Bernardino County, southern California.

It is north of Apple Valley, east of Interstate 15, and 8 miles (13 km) northeast of Victorville. The town lies at 3,082 feet above sea level on Dale Evans Parkway.

A post office was established in the community in 1953 but it was discontinued three years later.

== History ==
The rural community of Bell Mountain was founded in 1904 when a group of black homesteaders from Los Angeles began settling on government land around Victorville, California. Most of the Bell Mountain homesteaders were southerners who had migrated west in stages during the late nineteenth and early twentieth centuries, eventually arriving in California and at Bell Mountain. Their goal was to become landowners and to create a prosperous, “all-black” agricultural community in the desert outskirts of Los Angeles. These homesteaders included Nolie and Lela Murray, notable entrepreneurs from the Los Angeles black community who would go on to establish Murray's Dude Ranch at Bell Mountain in the 1930s.
