= Phil Arnold =

American actor (1909–1968)

- Arnold in Second Chorus
- Born: September 15, 1909; Hackensack, New Jersey, U.S.
- Died: May 9, 1968 (aged 58); Hollywood, California, U.S.
- Occupations: Film, television actor
- Years active: 1939–1968

Phil Arnold (born Philip Aronoff Arnold; September 15, 1909 – May 9, 1968) was an American screen, stage, television, and vaudeville actor and dancer. He appeared in approximately 150 films and television shows between 1939 and 1968.

== Career ==
Arnold is familiar to modern viewers for his roles in several Three Stooges films such as Pardon My Backfire, Sing a Song of Six Pants, Tricky Dicks and The Three Stooges Go Around the World in a Daze. Probably his best-known role was off-camera, as the voice of Peeping Tom in The Ghost Talks and as Sir Tom in its remake Creeps.

Arnold demonstrated his unique singing and dancing ability as a blackface minstrel in the early part of Yes Sir, Mr. Bones (1951 film) as "Benny," demonstrating the passing artform to the youngster at the "Show Boat Rest Inn."

Arnold also made appearances in such films as Yes Sir, Mr. Bones, Good Times, Blackbeard's Ghost, The Adventures of Bullwhip Griffin, Hold On!, Zebra in the Kitchen and Robin and the 7 Hoods. His television work includes The Twilight Zone, Cowboy G-Men, Maverick, I Love Lucy, Adventures of Superman and Bewitched.

== Death ==
Arnold died of a heart attack on May 9, 1968, aged 58.

== Partial filmography ==
- Buzzy Rides the Range (1940)
- Buzzy and the Phantom Pinto (1941)
- Dr. Broadway as a newsboy (uncredited) (1942)
- Killer at Large (1947)
- Deadline (1948)
- Yes Sir, Mr. Bones (1951)
- The Big Chase (1954)
- The Court-Martial of Billy Mitchell (1955)
- Official Detective TV series, episode "Armored Attack" as Barnett (1957)
- Colgate Theatre TV series, episode "Adventures of a Model" as Photographer (1958)
- The Incredible Mr. Limpet (1964) as Short Fishman (uncredited)
