= Buzzy and the Phantom Pinto =

1941 film

- Directed by: Richard C. Kahn
- Written by: E.G. Robertson
- Produced by: Richard L'Estrange
- Starring: Robert 'Buzz' Henry; Dave O'Brien; Dorothy Short
- Cinematography: Clark Ramsey
- Edited by: Adrian Weiss
- Production company: Ellkay Productions
- Distributed by: Independent Film Corporation
- Release date: May 5, 1941
- Running time: 55 minutes
- Country: United States
- Language: English

Buzzy and the Phantom Pinto is a 1941 American Western film directed by Richard C. Kahn and starring Robert 'Buzz' Henry, Dave O'Brien and Dorothy Short. It was the sequel to Buzzy Rides the Range, intended to be the beginning of a series although only two films were ever made.

== Cast ==
- Robert 'Buzz' Henry as Buzzy Wade
- Dave O'Brien as Jim Dana
- Dorothy Short as Ruth Wade
- George Morrell as Dude Bates
- Sven Hugo Borg as Kurt F. Henck
- Milburn Morante as Timothy Wade
- Frank Merlo as Miller
- Harry Norman as Hadley
- Don Kelly as Lucas
- Phil Arnold as The Stranger

== Bibliography ==
- Pitts, Michael R. Western Movies: A Guide to 5,105 Feature Films. McFarland, 2012.
