= Devil and the Deep =

1932 film

- Theatrical release poster
- Directed by: Marion Gering
- Screenplay by: Benn W. Levy
- Story by: Harry Hervey
- Based on: Sirenes et Tritons by Maurice Larrouy
- Starring: Tallulah Bankhead; Gary Cooper; Charles Laughton; Cary Grant
- Cinematography: Charles Lang
- Edited by: Otho Lovering
- Music by: Herman Hand; Rudolph G. Kopp; John Leipold
- Production company: Paramount Pictures
- Distributed by: Paramount Pictures
- Release date: August 12, 1932 (USA)
- Running time: 78 minutes
- Country: United States
- Language: English

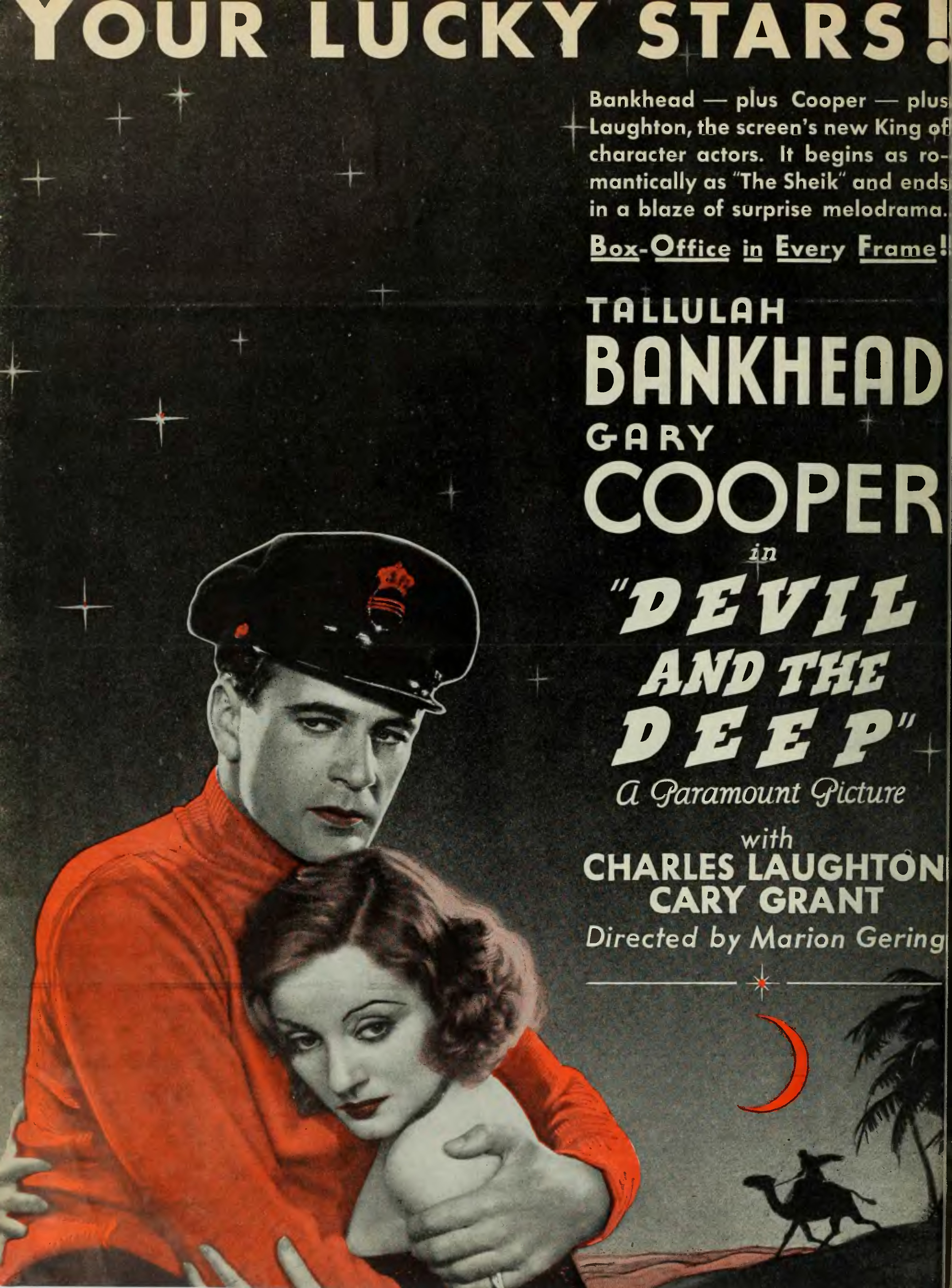
Devil and the Deep, 1932 ad in The Film Daily featuring Gary Cooper and Tallulah Bankhead

Devil and the Deep is a 1932 American pre-Code drama film directed by Marion Gering, based on Maurice Larrouy's novel (Sirenes et Tritons), and starring Tallulah Bankhead, Gary Cooper, Charles Laughton and Cary Grant. It follows a naval commander who has alienated his wife due to his insane jealousy over every man she speaks to. After his obsessive behavior drives her to the arms of a handsome lieutenant, tragic drama ensues.

== Plot ==
Charles Sturm is a naval commander whose jealousy and abuse makes life miserable for his wife Diana. His suspicions fall on his own subordinate, Lieutenant Jaeckel. Although his suspicions are baseless, Sturm has Jaeckel transferred. After Charles falls into another fit of paranoid rage and strikes Diana, she wanders off into the streets during a festival and soon encounters another officer, who turns out to be Jaeckel's replacement, Lieutenant Sempter. Learning of their affair, which this time is real, not imagined, Charles plots a terrible revenge.

On the night Commander Sturm's submarine is to sail, Diana goes aboard to warn Sempter of Sturm's dangerous frame of mind. But when Sturm arrives, he immediately orders the sub out to sea before Diana can return to shore. In the busy channel outside the harbor, Sturm deliberately maneuvers into the path of an oncoming ship, which rams and sinks the sub. Several compartments are flooded, but the crews are able to get out in time.

Trapped on the bottom, the survivors gather in the control room; Sempter and Sturm square off, asserting command, while Diana exposes Sturm's madness. Sempter takes control and organizes the crew's escape. In a detailed and substantially accurate technical sequence, Diana and the crew exit through the sub's escape trunk using Momsen lungs, and are rescued at the surface. Refusing to leave the ship, Sturm stays behind and lapses into raving insanity; he opens a watertight door to let in the sea, laughing maniacally as the water rises.

Afterwards, cleared of most charges by a court martial, Sempter encounters Diana again in a shop on the street. Soon it begins to rain, and they depart in a cab together.

== Cast ==
- Tallulah Bankhead as Diana Sturm
- Gary Cooper as Lieutenant Sempter
- Charles Laughton as Commander Charles Sturm
- Cary Grant as Lieutenant Jaeckel
- Paul Porcasi as Hassan
- Juliette Compton as Mrs. Planet
- Henry Kolker as Hutton
- Dorothy Christy as Mrs. Crimp
- Arthur Hoyt as Mr. Planet
- Gordon Westcott as Lieutenant Toll
- Consuelo Harris as Dancer
- James Dugan as Condover

== Production ==
This is the only film featuring both Gary Cooper and Cary Grant as the movie's leading men but they never appear together onscreen. However, in the following year's film version of Alice in Wonderland, Grant played the Mock Turtle and Cooper played the White Knight, having their only movie scene together (of sorts) as the entire cast appears in the tea party scene (including W.C. Fields as Humpty Dumpty).

== Reception ==
The film was generally well received by critics. David Fairweather of Theatre World stated: "This picture is, in my opinion, the best dramatic talkie we have yet seen. It is unabashed melodrama at times, but Charles Laughton's magnificent acting disarms criticism of the more violently sensational incidents". He further added "Tallulah Bankhead has better opportunities than of late as the distrait wife, but she is overshadowed by Laughton's amazing performance". Michael Orme of The Illustrated London News thought that the film was "generally thoughtful", but felt that Gering has over-staged certain scenes. He further praised Laughton: "To say that Mr. Charles Laughton succeeds in making this frankly melodramatic premise convincing is to pay the highest possible tribute to the uncanny way in which his personality and his acting dominate the film, even when he is absent from the screen."

== Sources ==
- Deschner, Donald (1973). The Complete Films of Cary Grant. Citadel Press. ISBN 0-8065-0376-9.
