= The Secret Menace =

1931 directed by Richard C. Kahn

- Directed by: Richard C. Kahn
- Written by: Richard C. Kahn
- Starring: Glenn Tryon; Virginia Brown Faire; Arthur Stone
- Cinematography: Bert Baldridge
- Edited by: Arthur A. Brooks
- Production company: Cardinal Productions
- Distributed by: Imperial Distributing Corp.
- Release date: December 28, 1931 (US)
- Running time: 59 minutes
- Country: United States
- Language: English

The Secret Menace is a 1931 American Western film written and directed by Richard C. Kahn. The film stars Glenn Tryon, Virginia Brown Faire, and Arthur Stone.

== Cast ==
- Glenn Tryon
- Virginia Brown Faire
- Arthur Stone
- Margaret Mann
- Ed Cecil
- John Elliott
- Jules Cowles
- Pat Harmon
- Joe Savage
- Charles Balda
- Vera McGinnis
