= Harlem on the Prairie =

1937 American race film

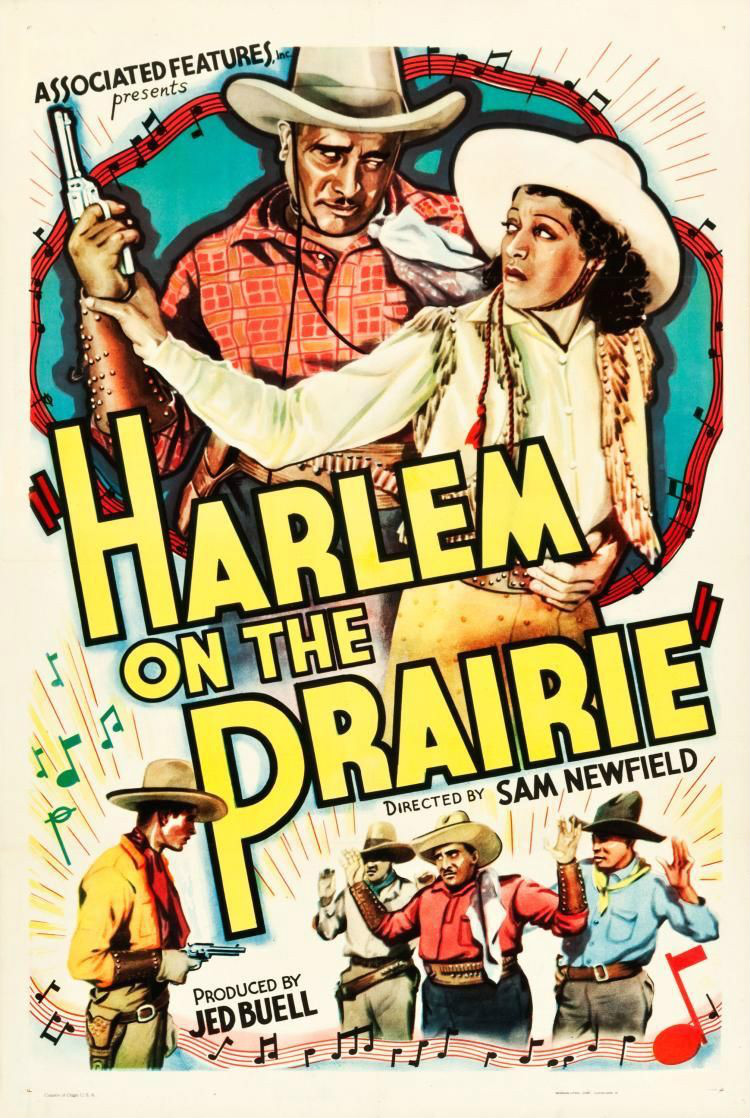
- Harlem on the Prairie Movie Poster
- Directed by: Sam Newfield; Jed Buell (co-director)
- Written by: Flournoy E. Miller; Fred Myton
- Produced by: Jed Buell
- Starring: Herbert Jeffrey; Spencer Williams; Connie Harris; Mantan Moreland; George Randol
- Cinematography: William Hyer
- Edited by: Robert Jahns
- Music by: Lew Porter
- Production company: Associated Features
- Distributed by: Sack Amusements
- Release date: December 9, 1937
- Running time: 57 minutes
- Country: United States
- Language: English
- Budget: $50,000

Harlem on the Prairie (1937) is an American race movie, billed as the first "all-colored" Western musical. The movie reminded audiences that there were black cowboys and corrected a popular Hollywood image of an all-white Old West.

It was produced by Associated Features, which was organized in 1937. The picture premiered at the Paramount Theatre in Los Angeles and was first shown in New York City at the Rialto Theatre on Broadway. The company had offices at 937 N. Sycamore Ave., Hollywood, California, and the officers of the company were Jed Buell, president; Bert Sternbach, vice president; and Sabin W. Carr, secretary-treasurer.

Harlem on the Prairie was filmed on location at the Walker Ranch in Newhall, California, and the Iverson Ranch, Chatsworth, California. President and chief producer Jed Buell spent less than $50,000 on this picture.

== Plot summary ==
Doc Clayburn returns with his medicine show and young daughter Carolina to the country where 20 years before he had been a rider with an outlaw gang and assisted in a gold robbery; the gold, which was hidden when all but Doc were killed in a fight with a posse, has never been recovered. When Doc is on his way to retrieve it and wipe out the memory of those early days, his caravan, which was trailed by a rival gang, is attacked and he is mortally wounded. Just before he dies, he gives a map of the gold cache to Jeff Kincaid, a younger rider he entrusts with the plan of finding the gold and restoring it to its rightful owners. In doing this, Jeff encounters the heavies, and Mistletoe and Crawfish supply the comedy relief.

== Cast ==
- Herbert Jeffrey as Jeff Kincaid
- Spencer Williamsas Doc Clayburn
- Connie Harris as Carolina, Doc's daughter
- George Randol as Sheriff
- Maceo Bruce Sheffield as Wolf Cain
- Mantan Moreland as Mistletoe
- Flournoy E. Miller as Crawfish (is credited with some of the writing)
- Lucius Brooks as Musician (as The Four Tones)
- Leon Buck as Musician (as The Four Tones)
- Ira Hardin as Musician (as The Four Tones)
- Rudolph Hunter as Musician (as The Four Tones)

== Background ==
The film combines all the typical elements of a good old-fashioned western. Melodrama, comedy, romance, action, and suspense are woven together as the characters strive to complete the old man's last wish and search for the gold. Somewhere within all of the riding, shooting and fighting bad guys Kincaid and his pistol-toting back-up group, The Four Tones, manage to sing both the title song, "Harlem on the Prairie", and the once-popular hit "Romance in the Rain". The film's hero, Herbert Jeffrey, who at the time was a popular singer with Earl "Fatha" Hines Band, initially conceived of making an all-black cowboy picture. He intended to distribute the film to the hundreds of movie houses across the South that catered exclusively to black audiences, as the strict racial segregation in effect in the South at the time forbade blacks and whites from being in the same theater at the same time. However, with the help of Gene Autry, another well-known screen cowboy, Jeffrey made a deal with Dallas-based Sack Amusements for national distribution.

The film was so successful that Sack Amusements executive Richard C. Kahn approached Jeffrey about continuing the saga of the black cowboy. Since rights to the original character of Jeff Kincaid were tied up with the original producer, Jed Buell, Kahn and Jeffrey created the character of Bob Blake and introduced his trusty horse Stardusk. The first film produced through this new partnership was Two-Gun Man from Harlem (1938).

A 1940 newspaper credited the film with holding the largest box-office profits of any all-African-American film.
