= The Bronze Buckaroo =

1939 film by Richard C. Kahn

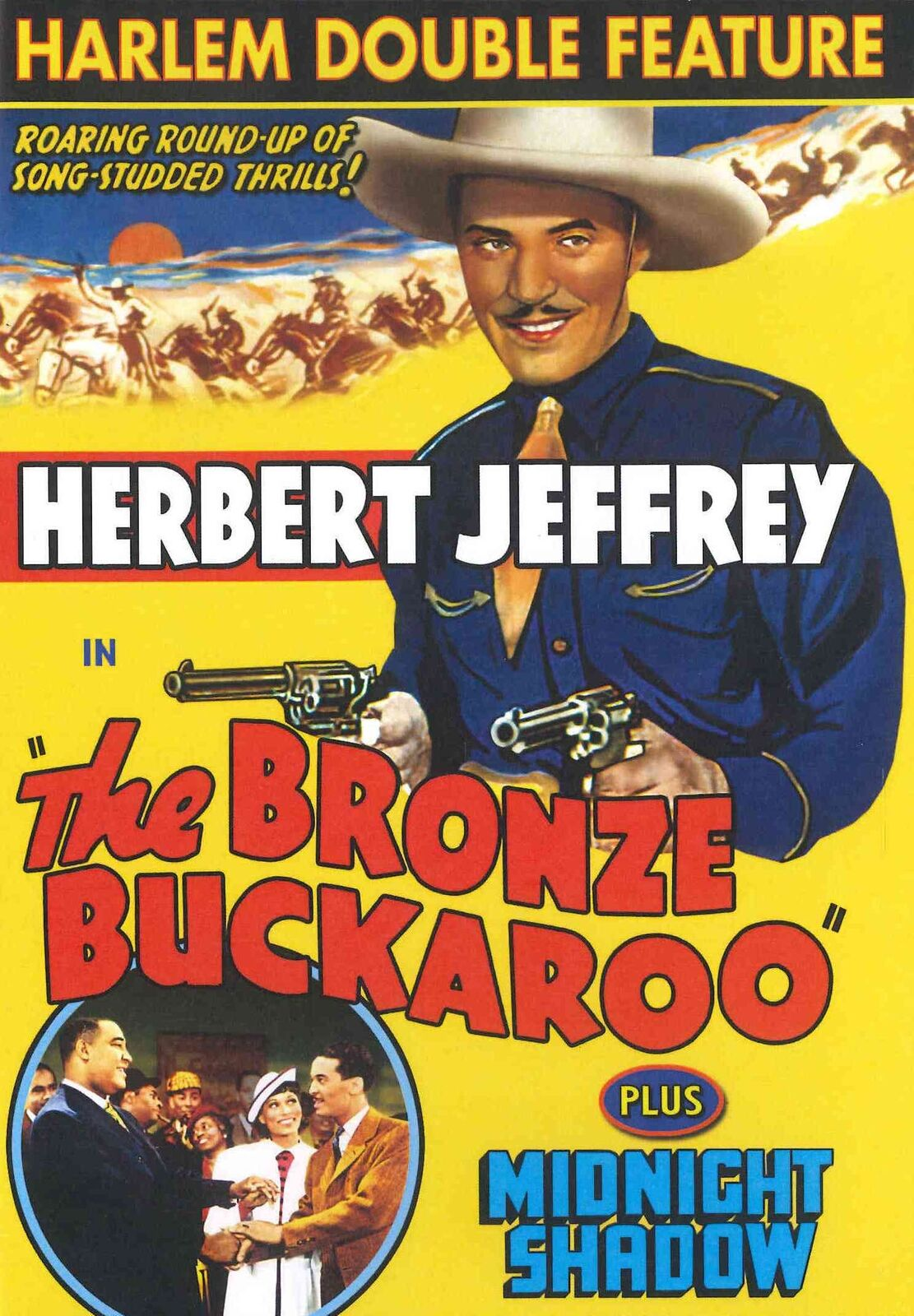
- Theatrical release poster
- Directed by: Richard C. Kahn
- Written by: Richard C. Kahn (original story); Richard C. Kahn (screenplay)
- Produced by: Richard C. Kahn; Jed Buell
- Starring: See below
- Cinematography: Roland Price; Clark Ramsey
- Music by: Lew Porter
- Production company: Hollywood Productions
- Distributed by: Sack Amusements
- Release date: January 1, 1939
- Running time: 58 minutes
- Country: United States
- Language: English

The Bronze Buckaroo (1939) by Richard C. Kahn

The Bronze Buckaroo is a 1939 American Western race film directed by Richard C. Kahn. The Bronze Buckaroo stars Black cowboy singer Herb Jeffries, here billed as Herbert Jeffrey.

== Plot ==
Cowboy Bob Blake receives a letter from his friend Joe Jackson, asking for help. Blake and his men travel to Jackson's ranch, only to discover from Jackson's sister Betty that Joe has been missing for three weeks. Meanwhile, Jackson's ranch hand (Slim Perkins) is learning to use ventriloquism to make the farm animals talk, and tries to convince the gullible Dusty to buy a talking mule.

Blake discovers that Jackson is being held by a local land grabbing rancher, Buck Thorne, who (with his partner Pete) has discovered gold on Jackson's ranch. They killed Joe's and Betty's father, and are trying to force Joe to deed the land over to Thorne. Blake develops a plan to rescue Jackson from where he is being held above the saloon, but runs into trouble. Betty sends Blake's men into the saloon as backup and is kidnapped by Thorne, who then threatens to kill Betty and Joe if they do not sign the deed. While Dusty rides for the sheriff, Blake and his men backtrack Betty's horse (who arrived home riderless). A gun battle ensues, with the sheriff arriving in the nick of time. The villains are hauled off to jail, and Blake rides into the sunset with Betty.

== Cast ==
- Herb Jeffries as Bob Blake
- Artie Young as Betty Jackson
- Rollie Hardin as Joe Jackson
- Clarence Brooks as Buck Thorne
- F. E. Miller as Slim Perkins
- Lucius Brooks as Dusty
- Spencer Williams as Pete
- Lee Calmes as Lee
- Earle Morris as Bartender
- The Four Tones as Singing Quartet

== Soundtrack ==
- Herb Jeffries - "I'm a Happy Cowboy"
- The patrons - "Almost Time for Roundup"
- Herb Jeffries and The Four Tones - "Got the Payday Blues"
- The Four Tones - "Get Along Mule"
