= Norman Studio =

Photography business based in Natchez, Mississippi

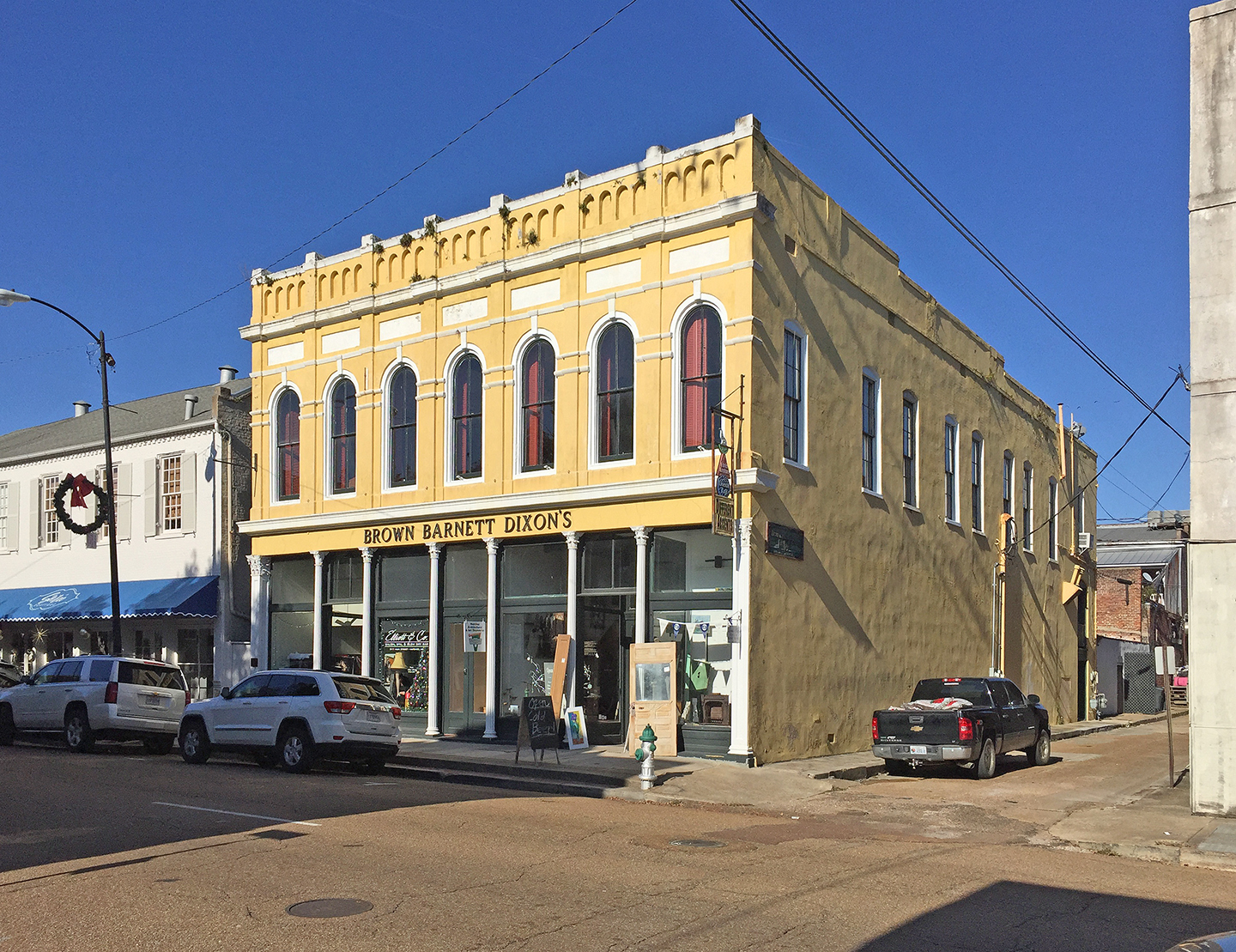
The Norman Studio was located on the second floor of this brick building at 511—15 Main Street in downtown Natchez, Mississippi.

The Norman Studio in photography refers to the family business run principally by photographers Henry C. Norman (1850–1913) and his son Earl Norman (1888–1951) in Natchez, Mississippi (United States) between 1876 and 1951, which produced around 75,000 images documenting many significant types of events and subjects in the various small towns along the lower Mississippi River. Its output remains one of the most valuable and comprehensive visual collections documenting Southern American life during the late nineteenth and early twentieth centuries.

In particular, the Norman Studio's work in Natchez documents the continuous growth and development of one of Mississippi's most prosperous cities during the periods of Reconstruction, the Gilded Age and the American Progressive Era, and to a lesser extent the Jazz Age and Great Depression. The surviving Norman Studio photographs currently reside in the Lower Mississippi Valley Collection of the libraries of Louisiana State University.

== History ==
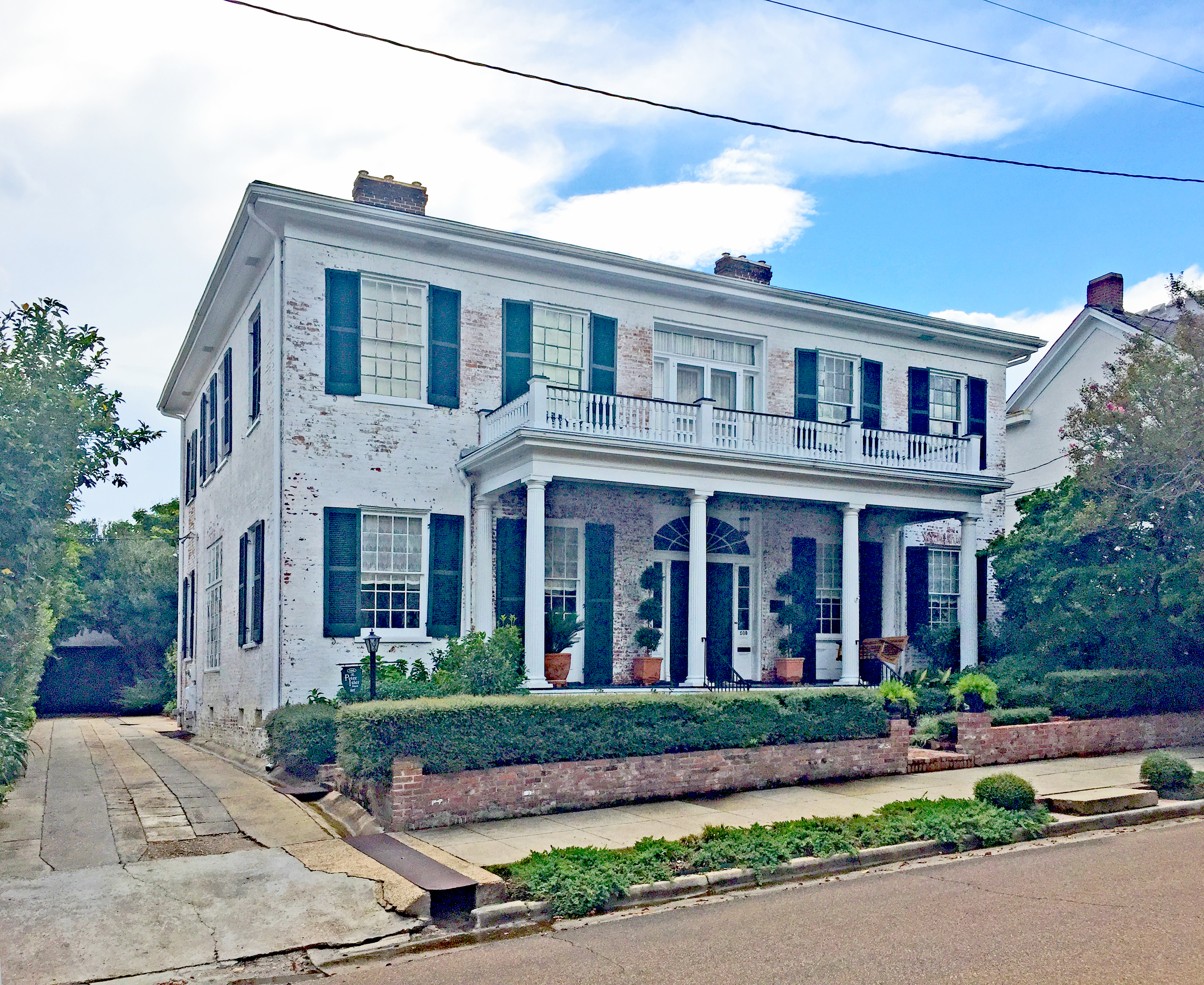
Henry C. Norman lived in this Natchez house, originally the residence of Peter Isler, one of the first printers in Mississippi, built about 1817. The front porch is a later addition to the Federal-style structure.

The Norman Studio's history dates to before the American Civil War. It was founded by local Natchez photographer Henry D. Gurney and his brother Marsh, who were two of the first photographers permanently based in Mississippi, having been operating in Natchez since 1851—a mere twelve years after the medium itself had even been invented in France by Louis Daguerre. The two men had come to Natchez from Massachusetts and quickly prospered, with Henry reporting an income of $100,000 in 1860, although Marsh died from a yellow fever epidemic in 1858. The physical fabric of Natchez, serendipitously, survived the American Civil War of 1861—65 virtually unscathed, unlike most urban centers in the American South. It was probably such fortune that drew the twenty-year-old Henry C. Norman to the city by steamboat in 1870 from Louisville, Kentucky, where he and his mother had moved from Georgia, following the death of Norman's father, Joshua, in 1865. Norman found a job working in Gurney's studio, and when the latter retired in 1876, Norman bought out the business, including Gurney's equipment.

Henry Norman soon set about becoming one of the most prolific and sought-after photographers in the lower Mississippi Valley. With the assistance of his wife Clara, he established his studio in downtown Natchez (commonly called the "On-Top-Of-The-Hill" district) on the second floor of a handsome brick building on Main Street with a cast-iron ground floor storefront. Norman's skill handling a camera meant that he was called upon over the next thirty-five years to document large numbers of people and events in the area, among both the white and African-American citizenry. He was well known for his portraiture, but Norman was not merely a studio man or a simple toiler at the disposal of every person who called. He frequently took his camera out with him to produce candid images of people in the streets or hard at work, along with children at play or resting in the grass on the bluffs high above the Mississippi River; the effects of inclement weather such as the floods that sometimes plagued the low-lying towns and the Natchez wharf; various industrial plants and complexes scattered around Natchez; and exciting daily events, such as the arrival of trains at the Yazoo and Mississippi Valley Railroad station from Baton Rouge or Vicksburg and beyond; or visits by dignitaries, including the 1909 stop in Natchez by then-President of the United States William Howard Taft. Norman's equipment of choice was a Kodak Century camera.

Henry and Clara Norman had three sons, all of whom eventually became photographers. Only the youngest, Earl, born in 1888, stayed to work with his father, and at only 25 years of age he inherited the studio when Henry died at age 62 in July 1913. For the next thirty-eight years, Earl continued upon the foundations that his father had built, until his own death in 1951.

== Preservation ==
Upon Earl Norman's death, the glass negatives and resultant positives essentially sat around collecting dust for the better part of the next decade on a partially-enclosed brick patio, exposed to the elements, until they were all purchased, along with the remaining photography equipment, from his widow in 1960 by Thomas H. Gandy, a Natchez physician, and his wife Joan, both ardent local preservationists. This was a pivotal moment in the Norman Studio's history, because the Gandys were deeply involved in the campaigns to save much of Natchez's historic fabric and helped found and head the Historic Natchez Foundation, still the city's main organization dedicated to the preservation of the built and material environment.

The Gandys then began the arduous task of cleaning the items and determining which of them were still usable and viewable. Some twenty percent of the collection was discovered to be unusable from the start due to exposure, but the remaining four-fifths yielded an impressive cache of images. The Gandys cross-referenced many images such as portraits with dates in the Normans' appointment books, and in other cases enlisted the help of elderly Natchez residents to help identify some of the subjects. They then selected the best of the lot and published them in several books with accompanying commentary during the 1970s and 1980s, giving the balance of the collection to Louisiana State University, in Baton Rouge, and then donating the rest after the publication of the books. (Thomas Gandy was an alumnus of LSU.) As of 2018 the LSU libraries have scanned a relatively small but significant cross-section of the photographs and made them available for viewing online.

In addition, a permanent exhibition of a sampling of some 500 images from the Norman Studio remains on display at Stratton Chapel at Natchez's First Presbyterian Church, at the corner of Pearl and State streets. It is open to the public regularly.

== Scope of the Collection ==
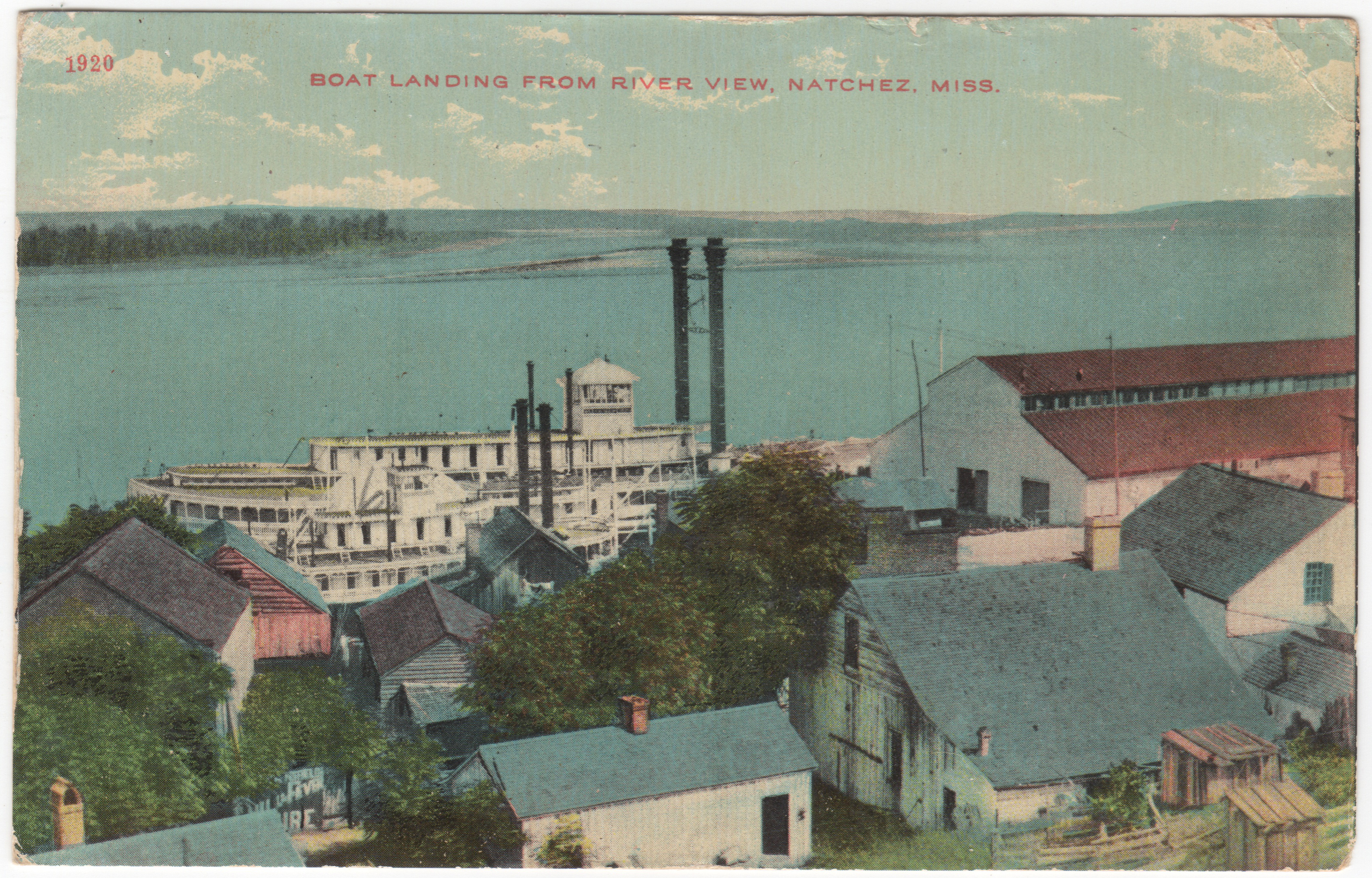
The grand boats of the celebrated Anchor Line were one of the Norman Studio's favorite subjects. Sometimes they could be captured on camera from a vantage point on the bluffs high above the Natchez landing, like the one seen here in this postcard.

The Normans and Gurneys documented all facets of life in and around Natchez and the region beyond. Their surviving output includes diverse subject matter, from panoramic views of the town taken from the steeple of St. Mary's (Catholic) Cathedral (now a minor basilica), to parties aboard barges and steamboats on the Mississippi River, to storefronts and architecture, to workers hauling harvested crops to market with draft animals, to local college baseball teams, to the disaster relief after periodic river floods, to hired laborers in nearby cotton fields, to ordinary street activity and gamblers playing card games.

Perhaps the most significant portions of the collection are the images of scores of steamboats that proved vital to the region's economic recovery in the decades of Reconstruction and the subsequent prosperity that sustained Natchez as one of Mississippi's most important cities well into the twentieth century. Despite their familiarity and importance to commerce in mid-continent America throughout the Victorian and Edwardian era, many of these vessels were never captured on negatives or film, and the Normans’ photographs remain, in some cases, the only surviving images of them, especially since steamboats were notoriously prone to natural or man-made disasters and might only last a few years or less.

The Norman Studio captured a great variety of steamboats that served the Natchez landing; these ranged from small family vessels that served local plantations and landings along the river to regional packet lines of two or three boats that made runs several times a week to cities such as Vicksburg, Greenville, Bayou Sara, and St. Joseph, Louisiana; and finally, the grand floating palaces of the biggest companies on the river like the Anchor Line and the Southern Transportation Company, operating regularly between New Orleans and St. Louis or Cincinnati. Henry C. Norman was often invited aboard the ships to photograph the lavish and humble cabins, dining rooms, decks, engine rooms, smokestacks, and crews. In the days before the construction of the Natchez-Vidalia Bridge in 1940, the Normans also documented the various ferryboats and tugs that regularly connected the twin towns on both banks of the Mississippi.

A similar charge might be made about much of the built environment of Natchez that has been subject to dramatic change during the twentieth century. Much of the surviving visual documentation of commercial and residential buildings in and around Natchez and farther afield lost to alterations, demolition, or disasters can be found in the Norman Studio's production. Included in this must also be the visual record of the former city of Bayou Sara, Louisiana, south of Natchez, abandoned in 1927 in favor of the higher ground of St. Francisville after repeated inundations such as that year's Great Mississippi Flood made habitation along the river's course impracticable.

== Photographic Methods ==
The Norman Studio was proficient in many types of photography as the medium evolved. They include:

- Daguerreotypes
- Ferrotypes
- Wet and dry glass-plate collodion negatives
- Film negatives

== Publications ==
- Gandy, Joan and Thomas H. Norman’s Natchez: An Early Photographer and his Town (Jackson: University Press of Mississippi, 1978).
- ________. Natchez Victorian Children: Photographic Portraits, 1865-1915 (Myrtle Beach: Myrtle Beach Press, 1981).
- ________. The Mississippi Steamboat Era in Historic Photographs: Natchez to New Orleans, 1870-1920 (New York: Dover, 1987).
- ________. Natchez Landmarks, Lifestyles, and Leisure (Mount Pleasant, SC: Arcadia, 1999).
- ________. Natchez City Streets Revisited (Mount Pleasant, SC: Arcadia, 1999).
