= Herb Jeffries =

American jazz singer and actor (1913–2014)

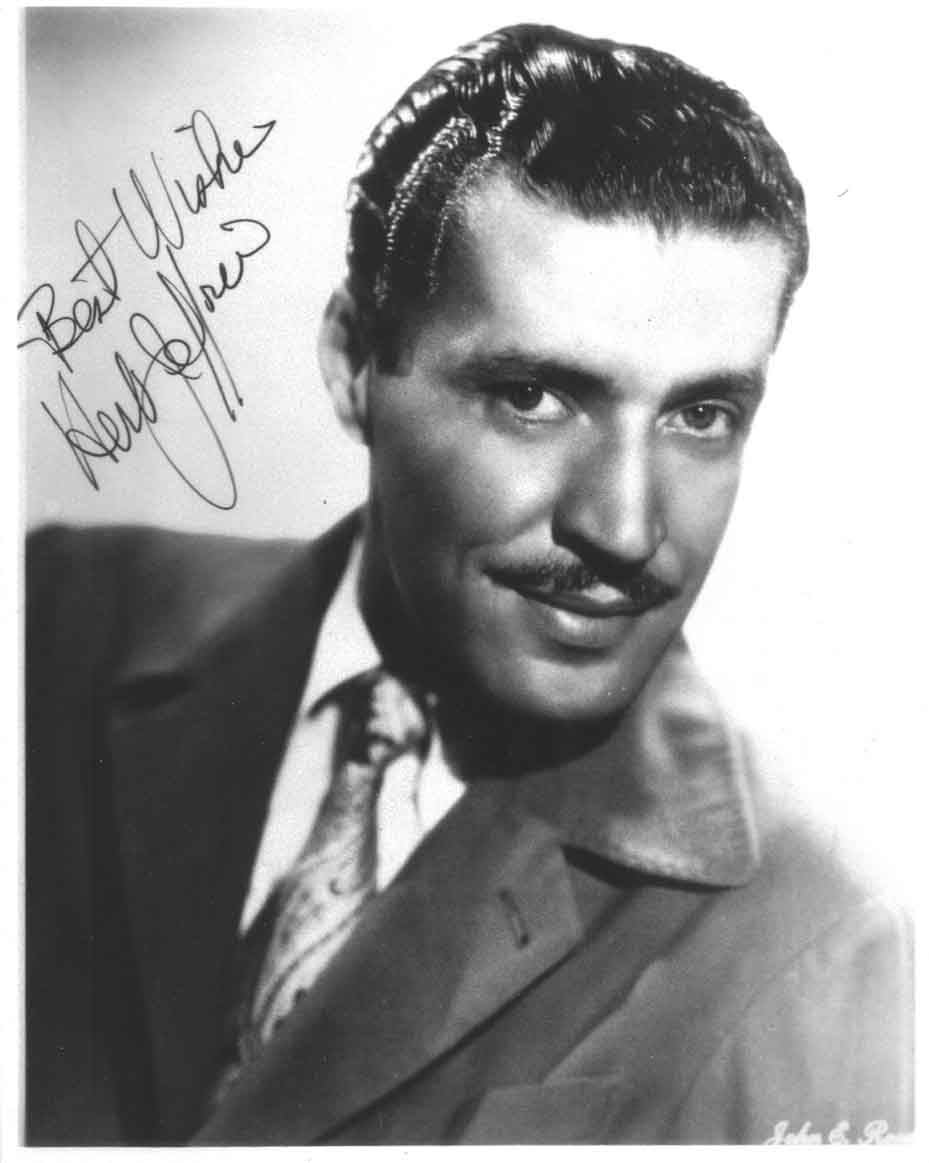
- Jeffries in 1944

Background information
- Also known as: Herbert Jeffrey; the Bronze Buckaroo; The Sepia Singing Cowboy
- Born: Umberto Alexander Valentino (alt. Umberto Alejandro Balentino) or Ballentino; September 24, 1913; Detroit, Michigan, US
- Died: May 25, 2014 (aged 100) West Hills, Los Angeles, California, US
- Genres: Jazz, popular
- Occupations: Singer, actor
- Years active: 1933–1995
- Label: Warner Bros.

Herb Jeffries (born Umberto Alexander Valentino; September 24, 1913 – May 25, 2014) was an American actor of film and television and popular music and jazz singer-songwriter, known for his baritone voice.

He starred in several low-budget "race" Western feature films aimed at black audiences, Harlem on the Prairie (1937), Two-Gun Man from Harlem (1938), Rhythm Rodeo (1938), The Bronze Buckaroo (1939) and Harlem Rides the Range (1939). He also acted in several other films and television shows. During his acting career he was usually billed as Herbert Jeffrey (sometimes "Herbert Jeffries" or "Herbert Jeffries, Sensational Singing Cowboy").

In the 1940s and 1950s Jeffries recorded for a number of labels, including RCA Victor, Exclusive, Coral, Decca, Bethlehem, Columbia, Mercury and Trend. His album Jamaica, recorded by RKO, is a concept album of self-composed calypso songs.

== Early life and ethnicity ==
Jeffries was born Umberto Alexander Valentino in Detroit to a white Irish mother who ran a rooming house. His father, whom he never knew, was of mixed French Canadian, Italian and Moorish roots. He also claimed that his paternal great-grandmother was an Ethiopian with the surname of Carey.

Firm evidence of Jeffries's race and age is hard to come by, but census documents from 1920 described him as mulatto and listed his father as a black man named Howard Jeffrey. Jeffries himself, late in life, said that Howard Jeffrey was his stepfather, and his biological father was Domenico Balentino, a Sicilian who died in World War I. Jeffries once described himself in an interview as "three-eighths Negro", claiming pride in an African-American heritage during a period when many light-skinned black performers were attempting "to pass" as all-white in an effort to broaden their commercial appeal. In marked contrast, Jeffries used make-up to darken his skin in order to pursue a career in jazz and to be seen as employable by the leading all-black musical ensembles of the day.

Much later in his career, Jeffries identified as white for economic or highly personal reasons. Jet reported that Jeffries identified as White and stated his "real" name as "Herbert Jeffrey Ball" on an application in order to marry Tempest Storm in 1959. Jeffries told the reporter for Jet:

... I'm not passing, I never have, I never will. For all these years I've been wavering about the color question on the blanks. Suddenly I decided to fill in the blank the way I look and feel. Look at my blue eyes, look at my brown hair, look at my color. What color do you see?" he demanded to know. "My mother was 100 per cent white," Jeffries said, his blue eyes glinting in the New York sun. "My father is Portuguese, Spanish, American Indian, and Negro. How in the hell can I identify myself as one race or another?"

Raised in Detroit, Jeffries grew up "a ghetto baby" in a mixed neighborhood without encountering severe racism as a child. In the aftermath of the Wall Street Crash of 1929, he dropped out of high school to earn a living as a singer. He showed great interest in singing during his formative teenage years and was often found hanging out with the Howard Buntz Orchestra at various Detroit ballrooms. Intensely musical from boyhood, he began performing in a local speakeasy, where he caught the attention of Louis Armstrong, who gave the teenager a note of recommendation for Erskine Tate at the Savoy Ballroom in Chicago. Knowing that Tate fronted an all-black band, Jeffries claimed to be a Creole and was offered a position as a featured singer three nights a week. Later he toured with Earl "Fatha" Hines's Orchestra in the Deep South.

A 2007 documentary short describes Jeffries as "assuming the identity of a man of color" early in his career. He is shown in Black/White & All That Jazz explaining that he was inspired by New Orleans-born musician Louis Armstrong to say falsely, at a job interview in Chicago, that he was "a Creole from Louisiana" when he was of Irish and Sicilian heritage, among other ethnic backgrounds.

== Music career ==
From Detroit, at the urging of Louis Armstrong, Jeffries moved to Chicago where he performed in various clubs. One of his first gigs was in a club allegedly owned by Al Capone. Jeffries began his career working with Erskine Tate and his Vendome Orchestra. Tate signed the 19-year-old Jeffries to a contract with his Orchestra at the Savoy Ballroom in Chicago. His break came during the 1933 Chicago World's Fair A Century of Progress International Exposition singing with the Earl Hines Orchestra on Hines' national broadcasts live from the Grand Terrace Cafe. His first recordings were with Hines in 1934, including "Just to be in Carolina". By 1940, he was singing with the Duke Ellington Orchestra and then recorded with him from 1940 to 1942. His 1940 recording of "Flamingo" with Ellington, released in 1941, sold more than 14 million copies in its day. His name had been Herbert Jeffrey, but the credits on the record mistakenly called him Jeffries, so he renamed himself to match the typo. During his time with the Duke Ellington Orchestra as a lead vocalist, Jeffries proved his talent as a mature singer, demonstrating his wide vocal range in such songs as "I Don't Know What Kind of Blues I've Got," "The Brownskin Gal," and "Jump for Joy" (all 1941). The 1944 single "My Little Brown Book" by Ellington and his Famous Orchestra, on which Jeffries provided vocals, reached No. 4 on Billboard R&B chart.

In his teens Jeffries developed a fine voice; initially he sang in higher registers. He started out his singing career as a lyrical tenor, but, on the advice of Duke Ellington's longtime music arranger, Billy Strayhorn, he lowered his range to mimic the vocal stylings of crooner Bing Crosby. Jeffries became a "silken, lusty baritone," according to music critic Jonny Whiteside.

In 1945, Jeffries had a hit on the Billboard R&B chart with "Left A Good Deal In Mobile" (No. 2), on which he was accompanied by pianist Joe Liggins and his band Honeydrippers. Then, he moved to Europe and performed there for many years, including at nightclubs he owned. He was back in America by the 1950s, recording jazz records again, including 1957 collection of ballads, Say It Isn't So.

In 1995, at age 81, he recorded The Bronze Buckaroo (Rides Again), a Nashville album of songs on the Warner Western label.

== Film career ==
Touring the Deep South with Hines, Jeffries was struck by the realities of segregation, as the Orchestra's playing was restricted to tobacco warehouses and black-only movie theatres. Watching young boys fill theatres to watch the latest western, Jeffries resolved to create a cowboy hero geared specifically for such an audience. A self-confessed western buff who had grown up watching the silent escapades of Tom Mix and Jack Holt, in the 1930s Jeffries set out to produce a low-budget western with an all-black cast. Though the silent era had seen a number of films starring only black actors, they had all but disappeared with the economic downturn and the arrival of the talkies, which proved too expensive for many of the "white independents" funding such projects. Jeffries's ambition was to produce sound cinema's "first all-Negro musical western". To fund his project, Jeffries approached a veteran B-movie producer named Jed Buell. Jeffries, having obtained finances, wrote his own songs for the film and hired Spencer Williams to appear with him. When Buell wanted to know of a likely candidate for the lead role, Jeffries nominated himself. Having grown up partly on his grandfather's farm, he had all the requisite horse-riding and roping skills, beside a fine singing voice, but Buell expressed concerns: Jeffries, whose mother was of Irish descent, was "not black enough". Eventually they went ahead, using make-up to darken the leading man's skin tone. Jeffries made his debut as a crooning cowboy with Harlem on the Prairie, which was considered the first black western following the inauguration of the talkies and the first sound Western with an all-black cast. The movie was shot in 1937 over five days at the Walker Movie Ranch in Newhall, CA, and the Iverson Movie Ranch in Chatsworth, CA, although later films in the series would be filmed at Murray's Dude Ranch in Apple Valley, California, with Jeffries performing all his own stunts. Though critical reception was mixed, the film received a write-up in Time magazine and grossed $50,000 in its first 12 months. Playing a singing cowboy in low-budget films, Jeffries became known as the "Bronze Buckaroo" by his fans. In a time of American racial segregation, such "race movies" played mostly in theaters catering to African-American audiences. The films include Harlem on the Prairie, The Bronze Buckaroo, Harlem Rides the Range and Two-Gun Man from Harlem.

Jeffries went on to star in another three musical westerns over the next two years. Jeffries starred as a singing cowboy, in several all-black Western films, in which he sang his own western compositions. In those films, Jeffries starred as cowboy Bob Blake, sang and performed his own stunts. Bob Blake was the good guy, with a thin mustache, who wore a white Stetson and rode a white horse named Stardusk. He went on to make other films, starring in the title role in Calypso Joe (1957), which co-starred Angie Dickinson. In 1969, he appeared in the long-running western TV series The Virginian (episode Stopover) in which he played a gunslinger who intimidated the town. In the 1970s he appeared on episodes of I Dream of Jeannie and (in 1969) Hawaii Five-0 [S1/Ep 17, "The Face of the Dragon" as Jardine] and was heard as the voice of football player "Freight Train" Jackson in the Hanna-Barbera Productions prime-time cartoon series Where's Huddles?. He later directed and produced Mundo depravados, a cult film starring his wife, Tempest Storm.

== Awards and honors ==
- Black Filmmakers Hall of Fame, 1979
- Hollywood Walk of Fame
- Palm Springs Walk of Stars, 1988
- Western Performers Hall of Fame, National Cowboy & Western Heritage Museum, 2004

== Personal life ==
His four marriages (including one to exotic dancer Tempest Storm) produced five children.

In 2007, while assembling material for the producers of a documentary film about him (A Colored Life), Jeffries found his birth certificate; this reminded him that he actually was born in 1913 and that he had misrepresented his age after he left home to look for a job.

In later years, he resided in Wichita, Kansas and Idyllwild, California. He died of heart failure at West Hills Hospital and Medical Center on May 25, 2014, at the age of 100. He was survived by his fifth wife, Savannah, three daughters, and two sons.

== Filmography ==
- Harlem on the Prairie (1937)
- Two-Gun Man from Harlem (1938)
- Harlem Rides the Range (1939)
- The Bronze Buckaroo (1939)
- Calypso Joe (1957)
- Chrome and Hot Leather (1971)
- Portrait of a Hitman (1979)
- Awake: The Life of Yogananda (2014)

== Discography ==
- All the World is New (Collaboration with composer Charles H. Beals,1947)
- Magenta Moods (Exclusive, 1950)
- Just Jeffries (Mercury, 1951)
- Flamingo (Coral, 1952)
- The Singing Prophet (Olympic, 1954)
- Jamaica (RKO, 1956)
- Say It Isn't So (Bethlehem, 1957)
- Herb Jeffries (Harmony, 1957)
- Devil Is a Woman (Golden Tone, 1957)
- Passion (Brunswick, 1957)
- I Remember the Bing (Dobre, 1978)
- I've Got the World on a String (Discovery, 1989)
- The Bronze Buckaroo (Rides Again) (Warner Western 1995)
- The Duke and I (2012)
