= Clarence Brooks (actor) =

American actor (1896–1969)

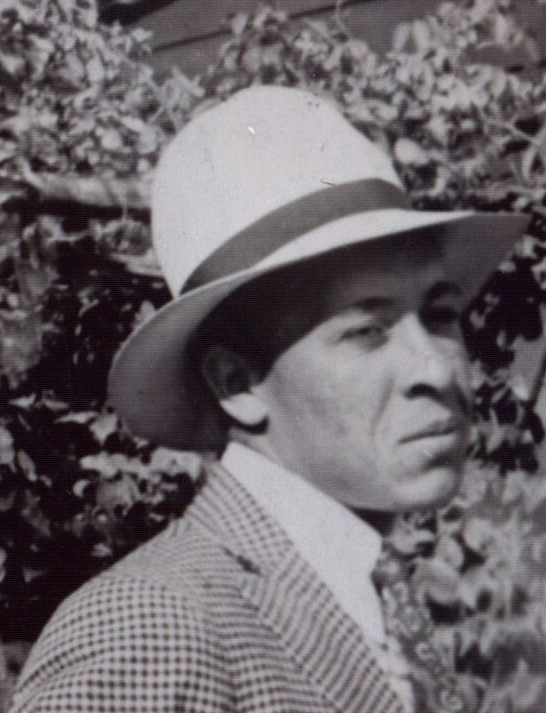
- Brooks, c. 1921
- Born: Clarence Ahart Brooks; 1896; United States
- Died: 1969 (aged 72–73); United States
- Occupation: Actor

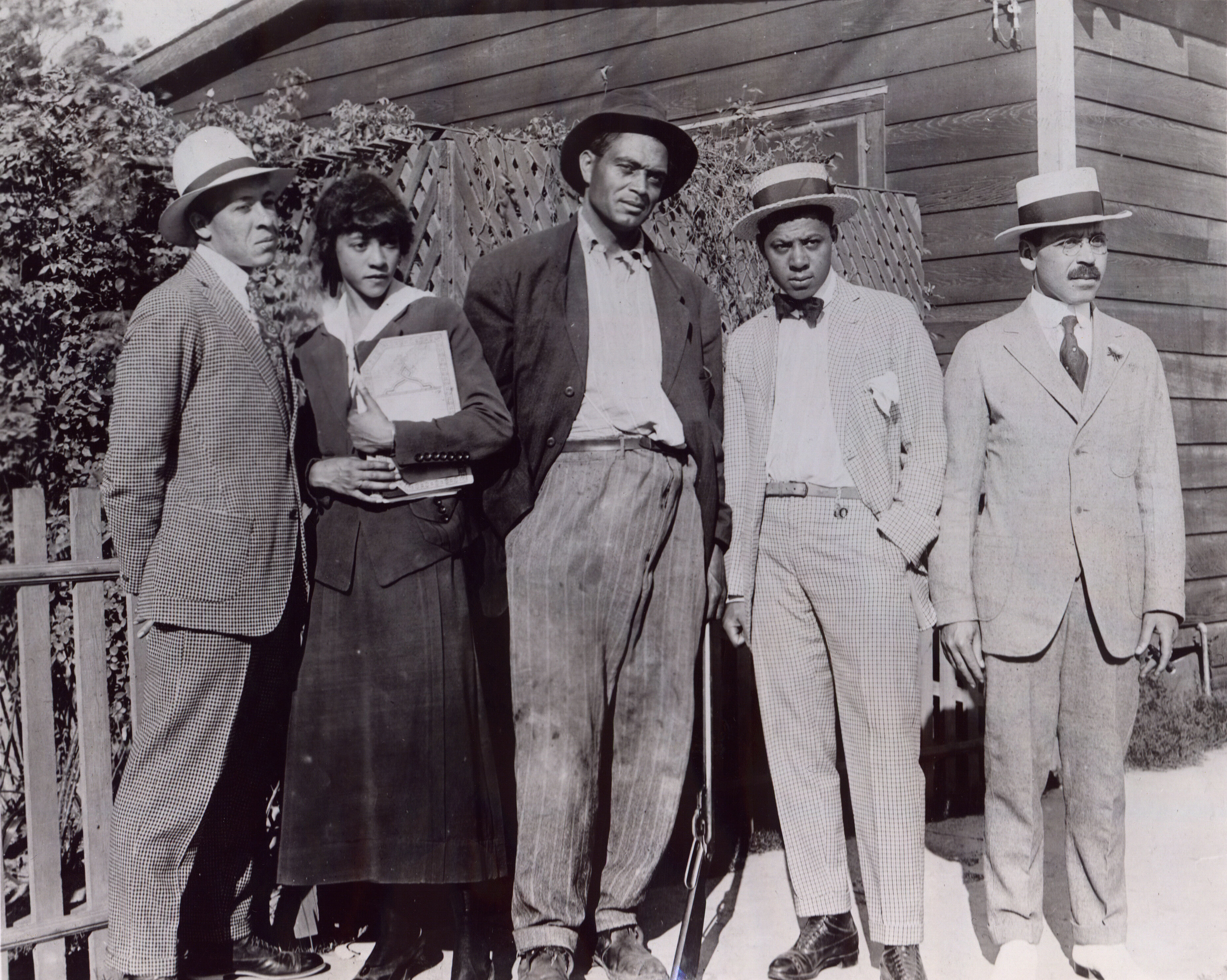
Lincoln Motion Picture Company staff, c. 1921. From left: Clarence A. Brooks (secretary), actress Beulah Hall, Noble Johnson (president), Dudley Brooks (assistant secretary), and Dr. James Smith (treasurer)

Clarence Ahart Brooks (also known as Clarence A. Brooks) (1896–1969) was an American actor. He appeared in numerous films including in starring roles. With Noble Johnson and James Thomas Smith he formed Lincoln Motion Picture Company in 1916. He starred in the 1921 film By Right of Birth.

He is featured in the 1989 documentary film That's Black Entertainment.

== Filmography ==
- The Realization of a Negro's Ambition (1916)
- The Trooper of Company K (1916)
- The Law of Nature (1916)
- A Man's Duty (1919)
- By Right of Birth (1921)
- Absent (1928)
- Georgia Rose (1930)
- Arrowsmith (1931)
- Murder in Harlem (1935), also released as Lem Hawkins' Confession
- Dark Manhattan (1937)
- Two-Gun Man from Harlem (1938)
- Harlem Rides the Range (1939)
- The Bronze Buckaroo (1939)
- Up Jumped the Devil (1941)
- Wild Women (1951)
