= A Man's Duty =

1919 film

- Directed by: Harry A. Gant
- Starring: Clarence A. Brooks
- Production company: Lincoln Motion Picture Company
- Release date: 1919
- Country: United States
- Language: English

A Man's Duty was a 1919 Lincoln Motion Picture Company film. It starred Clarence A. Brooks. It was advertised as featuring an "All Colored Cast". The film's story is about rivals fighting over a woman. Harry A. Gant directed.

Brooks debuted in the film company's first film, the 1916 short The Realization of a Negro's Ambition. He served as Secretary of the Lafayette Players. A Man's Duty was made after George Perry Johnson left the struggling film production company that endured loss of business due to World War I and Spanish flu.
