= By Right of Birth =

1921 film

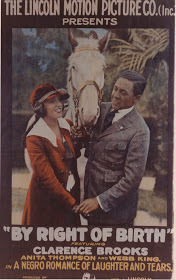
- Film poster
- Directed by: Harry Gant
- Screenplay by: Dora Mitchell story by George Perry Johnson
- Produced by: R.H. Updike
- Starring: Clarence Brooks; Noble Johnson; Beulah Hall Jones; Anita Thompson; Webb King; Beatrice George; Lester Bates; Lew Meehan
- Cinematography: Harry Gant
- Music by: John Spikes
- Production company: Lincoln Motion Picture Company
- Distributed by: Lincoln Motion Picture Co.
- Release date: June 22, 1921 (Los Angeles)
- Running time: 6 reels
- Country: United States
- Language: English

The film By Right of Birth premiered on June 22, 1921, in Los Angeles, California. This film was one of the few surviving films of the Lincoln Motion Picture Company, which is known as the first producer of race films and of such silent films as By Right of Birth. The company was founded in 1916 and in 1923 produced its last movie, The Heart of a Negro.

In 2022, associate professor Cara Caddoo from The Media School and the College of Arts and Sciences' Department of History at Indiana University Bloomington, while researching her newest book, found lost footage of Noble Johnson and Beulah Hall Jones from an early 1917 film, The Trooper of Troop K, spliced into By Right of Birth, another Lincoln Motion Picture Company film, released in 1921.

== Background ==
The film was directed by Harry Gant, who is also responsible for the films The Realization of a Negro's Ambition (1916) and Absent (1928). The story was by George Perry Johnson, both a writer and a member of the Lincoln Motion Picture Company executive board.

Surviving footage from By Right of Birth

Currently, only small pieces of this film still exist after being found by Earl Arnett is a basement at the University of California, Los Angeles. After almost 100 years since the creation of its 6 reels totaling 6,000 feet of film, only one four-minute clip of consecutive scenes from it is known. It was a silent movie; the music for it was created by John Spikes, who also wrote the song “Juanita” for the film.

== Plot ==
By Right of Birth is a film about a woman named Juanita Cooper, played by Anita Thompson. She had been raised by adoptive parents, Frank and Geraldine Cooper (played respectively by Lester Bates and Grace Ellenwood). She decides to search for her biological parents, with the help of the young attorney Manuel Romero (played by Lew Meehan), who has a secret crush on her. Manuel is trying to obtain land leases belonging to Freedmen in Oklahoma, specifically, black former slaves who had had American Indian owners, and the descendants of these slaves. The land that was allotted to these freemen is, unknown to them, rich in oil, and valuable to own. Manuel learns of a missing allottee named Helen Childers, the granddaughter of an old Indian woman by the name of Minnie Childers (played by Minnie Provost). Manuel forges her signature on a lease to get her rightful proceeds for himself instead. Geraldine Cooper and a detective “Pinky” Webb (played by Webb King) figure out through some research that Juanita is actually the same person as Helen Childers. The film ends with Juanita eventually finding her birth mother, Mother Agnes (played by Beatrice George), and inheriting a large sum of money, producing the film's happy ending in spite of villainous schemes; Romero, caught in his own lies, ends up dead because of it.

== Reviews ==
Audience reception of this film was positive, much like the other Lincoln Motion Picture Company’s films. The Sentinel commended the film by stating the film was “strikingly free of so many absurdities so often seen in colored productions” This film portrayed African Americans and Native Americans in a better light than most movies during the early 1900s. The Daily Herald also reviewed the film saying “[By Right of Birth is] free from racial propaganda such as has been characteristic in several similar productions attempted by other concerns”. By Right of Birth was only shown in colored movie theaters, because at the time blacks and whites were firmly separated.

== Significance ==
The film was a response to D.W. Griffith's 1915 film, The Birth of a Nation, which was about the American Civil War, and is infamous for its portrayal of the Ku Klux Klan as heroic; it also featured white male actors in blackface, often portrayed as hurting and harassing white women. The NAACP tried to get local film boards to ban the film, as well as providing education on the topics, but was largely unsuccessful, with many white Americans going to see the film and praising it. The Birth of a Nation is now preserved in the National Film Registry for historic education purposes.

There is a rumor that By Right of Birth almost cast a white man by the name of L.C. Shumway for the role of Manuel Romero. Records show he was paid for two weeks on set but he was never in the film. To cast a white man as the villain in a race film would be making a statement, which might have been something that the Lincoln Motion Picture Company was avoiding.
