= Law of nature =

Law of nature or laws of nature may refer to:

- Scientific law, statements based on experimental observations that describe some aspect of the world
- Natural law, any of a number of doctrines in moral, political, and legal theory
- Law of the jungle, the idea that in nature, the only "law" is to do whatever is needed for survival

== Media ==
- "Laws of Nature" (Agents of S.H.I.E.L.D.), episode of television series Agents of S.H.I.E.L.D.
- The Law of Nature (1917), a Lincoln Motion Picture Company film
- The Law of Nature (1919), an Arrow Film Corporation production

== See also ==
- "Rules of Nature", song in Metal Gear Rising: Revengeance
- Natural law (disambiguation)
- Crime against nature (disambiguation)
