= Clarence Brooks =

Clarence Brooks may refer to:

- Clarence Brooks (American football) (1951–2016), American football coach
- Clarence Brooks (actor) (1896–1969), American actor
