= The Trooper of Troop K =

Trooper of Troop K
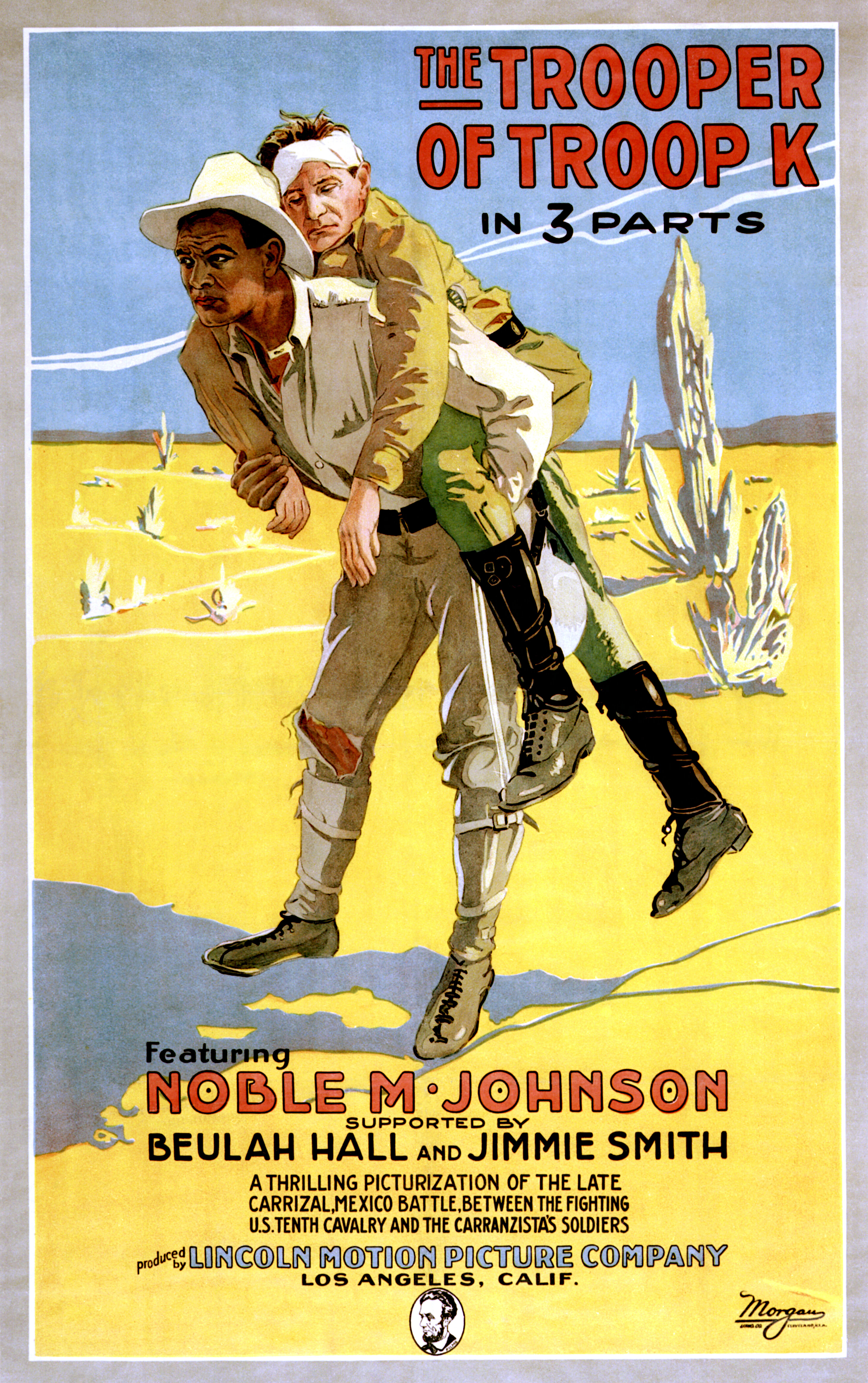
- Film poster
- Directed by: Harry Gant
- Starring: Noble Johnson; Jimmie Smith; Beulah Hall Jones
- Production company: Lincoln Motion Picture Company
- Distributed by: Lincoln Motion Picture Company
- Release date: 1917
- Running time: 3 reels
- Country: United States
- Language: English

The Trooper of Troop K is a Lincoln Motion Picture Company film produced in 1917, directed by Harry A. Gant and starring Noble Johnson. It was the production company's second film.

Set at the Battle of Carrizal, the film contains a battle scene with hundreds of extras, depicting African American U.S. soldiers fighting Mexican soldiers.

The film originally consisted of 3 reels of 35 mm movie film. Most of this is now lost film. The small portion that survives is earliest extant fragment of Black-produced cinema.

== Synopsis ==
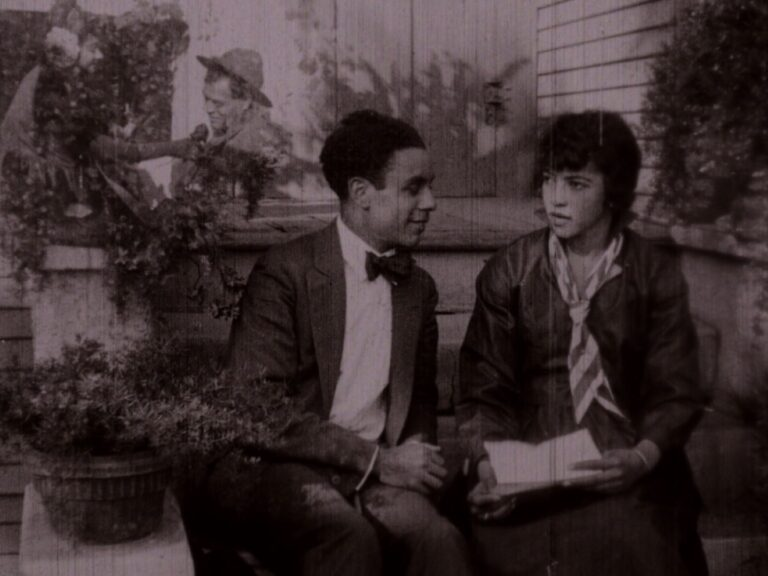
A frame from the small portion of the film that still exists. Hall and Smith are in the foreground; Noble in the upper-left iris shot was the key to the film's rediscovery in 2022.

Joe (Noble Johnson) is fond of Clara (Beulah Hall) but his inept romantic gestures do not impress her. Jimmy (Jimmie Smith) reacts with disgust to Joe's antics, and competes with Joe to win the affections of Clara. Joe joins the army because Clara suggests this will help Joe clean up his act.

The army captain is delighted by Joe's kind-hearted nature and his skill with horses. Joe and other soldiers are dispatched to Mexico, and fight in the Battle of Carrizal. The soldiers behave heroically against the superior firing power of Mexican Gatling guns. Joe saves the life of the white commanding officer of the 10th Cavalry Regiment.

Reading of Joe's heroism in the newspaper, Clara dismisses Jimmie's criticisms of Joe. She welcomes Joe home "with open arms".

== Filming and distribution ==
The battle scene had a cast of 300, including Mexican cowboys and former troopers of the 9th and 10th Cavalry. This was a major undertaking for the young film industry of the time.

The film was initially successful; the Lincoln Motion Picture Company created multiple print runs of the film to meet demand. Like most early Black documentaries or docudrama, the film had no means of distribution after its initial run and was largely forgotten.

== Rediscovery ==
The Trooper of Troop K was considered to be a wholly lost film until 2022, when a 15-second clip was rediscovered embedded within another film by the same company, By Right of Birth (1921). The rediscovery was possible because a film scholar identified Noble Johnson's face in a brief iris shot inset as a special effect in one corner of the film. Johnson had left the Lincoln Motion Picture Company in 1918, indicating the clip was older than 1921.
