= R. E. Irish =

American cinematographer

- Born: Robert Edison Irish; December 17, 1882; Chicago, Illinois, USA
- Died: May 14, 1962 (aged 79); Los Angeles, California, USA
- Other names: Roy Irish
- Occupation: Cinematographer

R. E. Irish (born Robert Irish) was an American cinematographer who worked in Hollywood during the earlier part of the silent era.

== Biography ==
Robert (sometimes called Roy) was born in Chicago, Illinois, to Fred Irish and Ella Schutt. After his father's death, he and his mother moved out to Los Angeles during the 1910s, where Robert began a career as a cinematographer when motion pictures were in their infancy. He collaborated with director Robert Z. Leonard early on. He also owned his own photography studio.

== Selected filmography ==
- The Tiger's Coat (1920)
- The Reckoning Day (1918)
- The Empty Cab (1918)
- The Sudden Gentleman (1917)
- The Stainless Barrier (1917)
- Some Boy (1917)
- The Book Agent (1917)
- The Saintly Sinner (1917)
- The Terror (1917)
- Love Aflame (1917)
- Fighting for Love (1917)
- The Eagle's Wings (1916)
- Little Eve Edgarton (1916)
- The Crippled Hand (1916)
- Judge Not; or The Woman of Mona Diggings (1915)
- The Broken Coin (1915)
