= Crime against nature (disambiguation) =

Crime(s) against nature may refer to:

- Crime against nature, a form of sexual behavior that is not considered natural and is seen as a punishable offense in some jurisdictions
- Crimes Against Nature (1990 book), a book about lesbian parenting by Minnie Bruce Pratt (1946–2023)
- Crimes Against Nature (2004 book), a political book by Robert F. Kennedy Jr. (born 1954)
  - "Crimes Against Nature", the title of a letter by Robert F. Kennedy Jr. published in the December 11, 2003 issue of Rolling Stone magazine

== See also ==
- Law of nature (disambiguation)
- Natural law (disambiguation)
