= Jack Mulhall =

American actor (1887–1979)

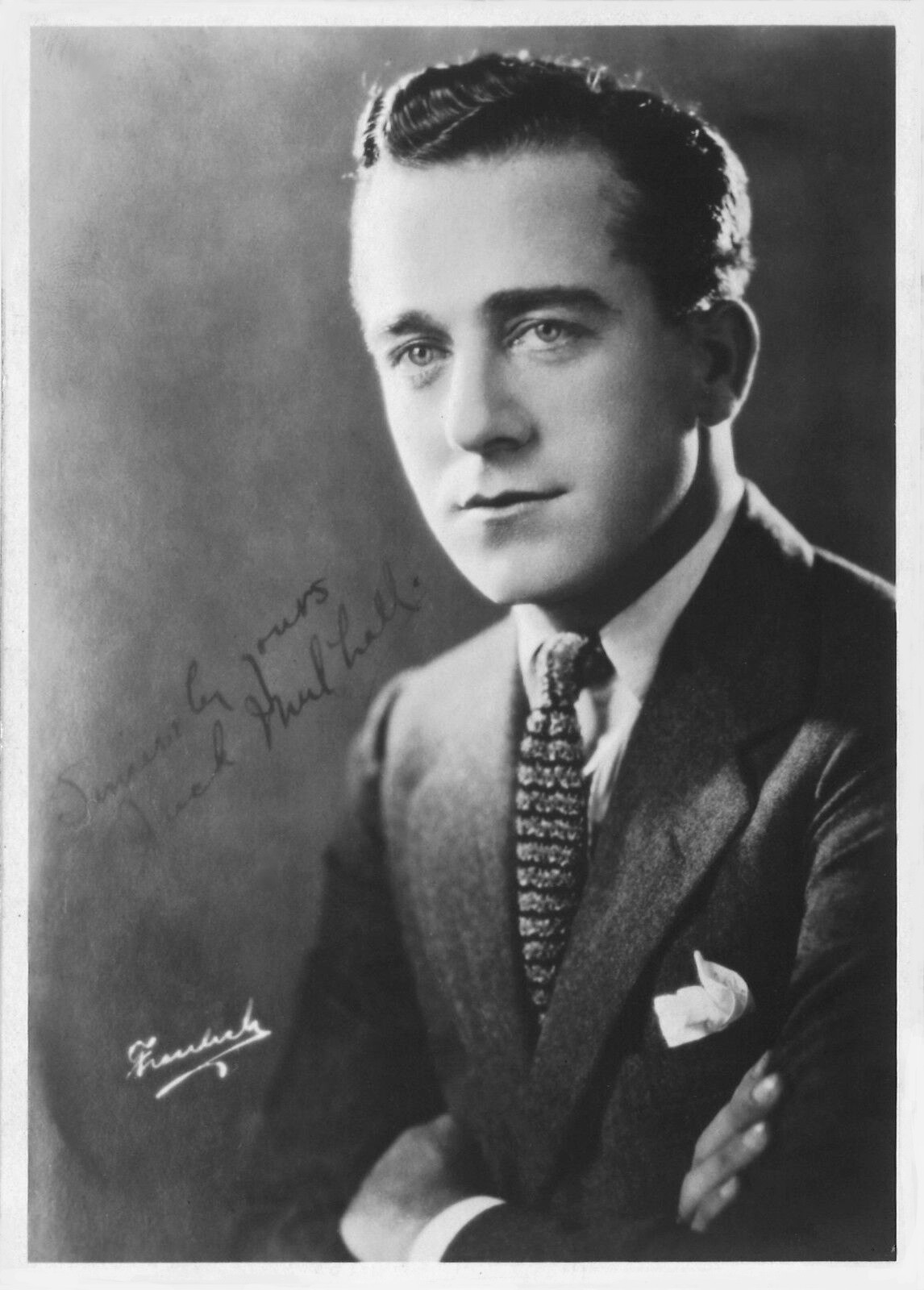
- Mulhall, c. 1920
- Born: John Joseph Francis Mulhall; October 7, 1887; Wappingers Falls, New York, US
- Died: June 1, 1979 (aged 91); Woodland Hills, Los Angeles, California, US
- Occupation: Actor
- Years active: 1901–1979
- Spouse(s): Laura Mulhall (divorced; 1 child); Bertha Vuillot (her death); Evelyn Mulhall (m.1924)

Signature
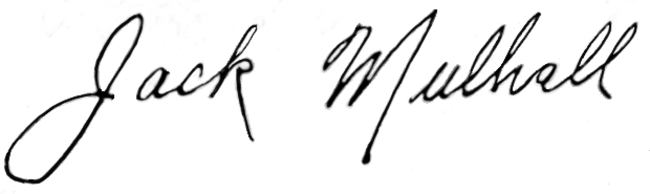

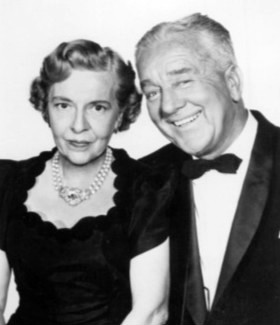
Mulhall with actress Madge Kennedy in an episode of Goodyear Theater, 1959.

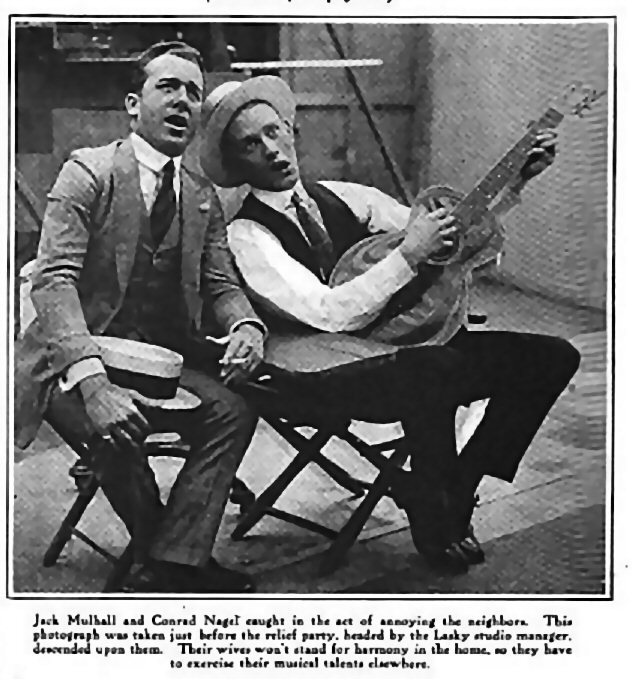
Jack Mulhall (left) singing offstage with Conrad Nagel (c. 1920)

John Joseph Francis Mulhall (October 7, 1887 – June 1, 1979) was an American actor whose film career began in the silent film era. He attained film stardom during the late 1910s and 1920s. While he successfully transitioned to sound films, he was often relegated to small supporting roles in his later career. Overall, he appeared in over 430 films in a career spanning 50 years.

== Early years ==
Mulhall was born in Wappingers Falls, New York. He was one of six children born to an Irish father and a Scottish mother. He began helping with carnival acts when he was 14 years old.

== Career ==
Before acting in films, Mulhall worked in legitimate theater, musical comedy, and vaudeville. He also worked as a model for magazine illustrators. His first film appearance (other than as an extra) was in The Fugitive (1910).

During the silent era, Mulhall was a popular screen player, particularly in the 1920s, and he starred in such films as The Social Buccaneer, The Mad Whirl and We Moderns. Some of his more prominent mid-career roles were in The Three Musketeers (1933), Burn 'Em Up Barnes (1934) and The Clutching Hand (1936). He last appeared in a film in 1959 (The Atomic Submarine).

In the late 1940s, Mulhall joined Blackouts, a stage revue produced by Ken Murray. After that production ended in 1949, he went on to appear on television programs in the 1950s. His last television appearance was on 77 Sunset Strip.

After he left acting, Mulhall worked for the Screen Actors Guild as a contract negotiator until 1974.

== Personal life ==
During the peak of his success in films, Mulhall bought "large land holdings in what is now Sherman Oaks in the San Fernando Valley." However, losses in the Great Depression wiped out his fortune.

Mulhall's first wife was Bertha Vuillot, who died soon after they wed. His second wife, Laura Brunton, committed suicide in 1921. Later in 1921, he married Evelyn Winans. They remained married until his death in 1979.

== Death ==
In 1979, Mulhall died from congestive heart failure at the Motion Picture & Television Country House and Hospital in Woodland Hills, California. He was 91. He was buried in Holy Cross Cemetery in Culver City, California.

== Recognition ==
For his contributions to the motion picture industry, Mulhall received a star on the Hollywood Walk of Fame at 1724 Vine Street. It was dedicated on February 8, 1960.

== Filmography ==
1910

- The Fugitive (Short) as New Boy Friend
- Sunshine Sue (Short) as Piano Store Employee
- A Child's Stratagem (Short) as In Office

1913

- The House of Discord (Short)

1914

- Strongheart (Short) as In Stadium Crowd
- Who's Looney Now? (Short)
- The Fall of Muscle-Bound Hicks (Short) as Harry
- They Called It 'Baby' (Short) as 1st Policeman
- The Broken Rose (Short) as Dick Guild as an Adult
- All for Business (Short) as The Broker's Secretary
- A Better Understanding (Short) as The Young Composer
- Blacksmith Ben (Short)
- Little Miss Make-Believe (Short) as The Bachelor
- For Her People (Short) as The Young Art Student
- The Suffering of Susan (Short) as Pupil

1915

- All for the Boy (Short) as The Boy
- The Gang's New Member (Short) as The Cub Reporter
- Their Divorce Suit (Short) as The Husband
- Rose o' the Shore (Short) as Rose's 1st Suitor
- His Brother's Keeper (Short) as Jack, 2nd Brother
- The Bridge Across (Short) as The Northern Boy
- The Girl and the Matinee Idol (Short) as The Girl's Suitor
- One Hundred Dollars (Short) as Billy Harvey, the Husband
- When Hearts Are Young (Short) as Jack Prentice
- His Poor Little Girl (Short) as The Poor Girl's Sweetheart
- A Much-Needed Lesson (Short) as The Young Husband
- The Little Scapegoat (Short) as Jack, the Bachelor
- Bobby's Bargain (Short) as Bobby's Father
- His Ward's Scheme (Short) as The Ward's Sweetheart
- The Girl Hater (Short) as John Morgan, Ralph's Son
- Love's Melody (Short) as The Young Actor
- The Little Runaways (Short) as Mr. Hilton
- A Letter to Daddy (Short) as Young Townsend
- The Fixer (Short) as Jack
- The Little Slavey (Short) as The Crook's Young Pal
- His Last Wish (Short) as McGraw - the Doctor's Son
- The Need of Money (Short) as The Young Laborer
- Dora (Short) as William Allen
- At the Road's End (Short) as The Boy
- A Kentucky Episode (Short) as Jack Benson
- The Girl Who Didn't Forget (Short) as The Grocery Clerk
- Arline's Chauffeur (Short) as The Chauffeur
- Harvest (Short)
- The Sheriff's Trap (Short) as The Widow's Son
- Woman Without a Soul (Short) as Clifton
- Her Stepchildren (Short) as Frank
- The Tides of Retribution (Short) as Jim Carpenter
- Père Goriot as Eugene

1916

- The Avenging Shot (Short)
- The Skating Rink (Short)
- Stronger Than Woman's Will (Short)
- The Chain of Evidence (Short)
- The Iron Will (Short) as Kalamon
- The Guilt of Stephen Eldridge (Short) as Douglas Gordon
- The Mystery of Orcival (Short) as M. Plantat, Justice of the Peace
- The Rejuvenation of Aunt Mary (Short) as Clover
- Alias Jimmy Barton (Short) as Chester Randolph
- The Man Who Called After Dark (Short) as Robert Whitmore
- Celeste (Short) as The Tourist
- A Spring Chicken (Short) as Farmer Chickweed
- Merry Mary (Short) as Brannigan - the Lunatic
- The Crimson Yoke (Short) as Casimir
- The Whirlpool of Destiny as George Bell
- Wanted: A Home as Dr. Prine
- The Place Beyond the Winds as Dick Travers
- The Eyes of Love (Short) as Robert
- The Price of Silence as Ralph Kelton

1917

- Fighting for Love as Jim
- Love Aflame as Jack Calvert
- The Terror as Chuck Connelly
- The Saintly Sinner as George Barnes
- Mr. Dolan of New York as Jimmy Dolan
- Her Primitive Man (Short) as Wadsworth
- The Hero of the Hour as Billy Brooks
- The Gunman's Gospel (Short) as Harry Donovan
- The Flame of Youth as Jimmy Gordon
- Three Women of France (Short) as Raoul Renfret
- High Speed as 'Speed' Cannon
- The Midnight Man as Bob Moore
- Sirens of the Sea as Gerald Waldron

1918

- The Grand Passion as Jack Ripley
- The Flames of Chance as Harry Ledyard
- Madame Spy as Robert Wesley
- Wild Youth as Orlando Guise
- The Whispering Chorus as Priest (uncredited)
- The Brass Bullet as Jack James
- Danger, Go Slow as Jimmy, the Eel

1919

- Don't Change Your Husband as Member of Gambling Club (uncredited)
- Creaking Stairs as Fred Millard
- Whom the Gods Would Destroy as Jack Randall
- Fools and Their Money as Richard Tompkins
- The Solitary Sin as Bob
- A Favor To A Friend as Robert Garrison
- The Spite Bride as Rodney Dolson
- The Merry-Go-Round as Jack Hamilton
- Should a Woman Tell? as Albert Tuley

1920

- All of a Sudden Peggy as Honorable Jimmy Keppel
- Miss Hobbs as Percy Hackett
- The Hope as Harold, Lord Ingestre
- You Never Can Tell as Prince

1921

- The Off-Shore Pirate as Toby Moreland
- The Little Clown as Dick Beverley
- Two Weeks with Pay as J. Livingston Smith
- The Ne'er to Return Road (Short) as The Stranger
- Molly O' as Dr. John S. Bryant
- Sleeping Acres (Short)

1922

- The Fourteenth Lover as Richard Hardy
- Turn To The Right as Joe Bascom
- Midnight as Jack Dart
- The Sleepwalker as Phillip Carruthers
- Flesh and Blood as Ted Burton
- Dusk to Dawn as Philip Randall
- The White and Yellow (Short) as Charley Le Grant
- The Channel Raiders (Short) as Charley Le Grant
- Broad Daylight as Joel Morgan
- The Forgotten Law as Victor Jarnette
- Pirates of the Deep (Short) as Charley Le Grant
- The Law of the Sea (Short) as Charley Le Grant
- The Siege of the Lancashire Queen (Short) as Charley Le Grant
- Heroes of the Street as Howard Lane

1923

- Dangerous Waters (Short) as Charley Le Grant
- The Social Buccaneer as Jack Norton
- The Yellow Handkerchief (Short) as Charley Le Grant
- The Wolves of the Waterfront (Short) as Charley Le Grant
- Within the Law as Richard Gilder, his son
- Dulcy as Gordon Smith
- The Call of the Wild as John Thornton
- The Bad Man as Gilbert Jones
- The Marriage Market as Roland Carruthers
- The Drums of Jeopardy as Jerome Hawksley

1924

- The Goldfish as Jimmy Wetherby
- Into the Net as Robert 'Bob' Clayton
- The Breath of Scandal as Bill Wallace
- The Folly of Vanity as Robert (modern sequence)

1925

- Three Keys as Jack Millington
- The Mad Whirl as Jack Herrington
- Friendly Enemies as William Pfeiffer
- She Wolves as Lucien 'D'Artois
- Wild West as Jimmy Whitehawk
- Classified as Lloyd Whiting
- We Moderns as John Ashler
- Joanna as John Wilmore

1926

- Pleasures of the Rich as Dick Clayton
- The Far Cry as Frank Clayton
- The Dixie Merchant as Jimmy Pickett
- Silence as Arthur Lawrence
- Sweet Daddies as Jimmy O'Brien
- Subway Sadie as Herb McCarthy
- God Gave Me Twenty Cents as Steve Doren
- Just Another Blonde as Jimmy O'Connor

1927

- Orchids and Ermine as Richard Tabor
- See You in Jail as Jerry Marsden
- The Poor Nut as John 'Jack' Miller
- Smile, Brother, Smile as Jack Lowery
- The Crystal Cup as Geoffrey Pelham
- Man Crazy as Jeffery Pell

1928

- Ladies' Night in a Turkish Bath as 'Speed' Dawson
- Lady Be Good as Jack
- The Butter and Egg Man as Peter Jones
- Waterfront as Jack Dowling
- Naughty Baby as Terry Vandeveer

1929

- Children of the Ritz as Dewey Haines
- Two Weeks Off as Dave Pickett
- Twin Beds as Danny Brown
- Dark Streets as Pat McGlone / Danny McGlone
- The Show of Shows as Performer in '$20 Bet' Sketch and 'Bicycle Built for Two' Number

1930

- Second Choice as Owen Mallery
- In the Next Room as James Godfrey
- The Golden Calf as Philip Homer
- Murder Will Out as Leonard Staunton
- Showgirl in Hollywood as Jimmie Doyle
- The Fall Guy as Johnny Quinlan
- Road to Paradise as George Wells
- For the Love o' Lil as Wyn Huntley
- Reaching for the Moon as Jimmy Carrington

1931

- Lover Come Back as Tom Evans
- Night Beat as Johnny Molinas

1932

- Sally of the Subway as Grand Duke Ludwig of Saxe-Thalberg
- Murder at Dawn as Danny
- Sinister Hands as Detective Captain Herbert Devlin
- Love Bound as Richard 'Dick' Randolph, posing as Dick Rowland
- Passport to Paradise as Bob
- Hell's Headquarters as Ross King

1933

- The Three Musketeers (Serial) as Clancy
- Curtain at Eight as Carey Weldon
- Secret Sinners as Jeff Gilbert
- The Mystery Squadron as Henry 'Hank' Davis

1934

- Many Happy Returns as Actor
- Burn 'Em Up Barnes as 'Burn-'em-Up' Barnes
- Whom the Gods Destroy as Godfrey Elliot (uncredited)
- The Old Fashioned Way as Dick Bronson
- The Notorious Sophie Lang as Jewelry Clerk
- The Human Side as Actor (uncredited)
- Cleopatra as Roman Greeting Antony (uncredited)
- Evelyn Prentice as Gregory (uncredited)
- It's a Gift as Butler (uncredited)
- Broadway Bill (uncredited)
- Bandits and Ballads (Short)
- Behold My Wife as Reporter at Train (uncredited)
- One Hour Late as Whittaker (uncredited)

1935

- The Woman in Red as Mr. Crozier, Seated Guest on Yacht (uncredited)
- I've Been Around as Minor Role
- Mississippi as Duelist (uncredited)
- Straight from the Heart as Reporter (uncredited)
- George White's 1935 Scandals as Theater Ticket Seller (uncredited)
- Wig-Wag (Short) as Jack Winchell
- Roaring Roads as Donald McDowell
- The Fighting Lady as George Davis
- Reckless as Paul's Restrainer in Bar (uncredited)
- Love in Bloom as Beggar (uncredited)
- The Informer as Man at Wake (uncredited)
- The Headline Woman as Police Sergeant Blair
- People Will Talk as Sam Baxter (uncredited)
- What Price Crime? as Hopkins
- Paris in Spring as George, Cafe Simone Doorman
- Chinatown Squad as Desk Clerk, St. Francis Hotel (uncredited)
- Pickled Peppers (Short)
- The Glass Key (uncredited)
- Love Me Forever as Gambler (scenes deleted)
- Men Without Names as Reporter (uncredited)
- Lady Tubbs as Stevens - Hotel Clerk (uncredited)
- Here's to Romance as Secretary (uncredited)
- Here Comes the Band as Soldier (scenes deleted)
- Page Miss Glory as Reporter (uncredited)
- Two for Tonight as Gordon's Doctor (uncredited)
- The Gay Deception as Bank Teller (uncredited)
- The Big Broadcast of 1936 as Radio Executive (uncredited)
- His Night Out as Salesman
- The Last Days of Pompeii as Citizen of Pompeii (uncredited)
- Your Uncle Dudley as Advertising Man (uncredited)
- Skull and Crown as Ed
- The Shadow of Silk Lennox as Ferguson, alias 'Fingers' Farley

1936

- Custer's Last Stand as Lieutenant Cook
- Strike Me Pink as Stagedoor Johnny (uncredited)
- Anything Goes as Purser (uncredited)
- A Face in the Fog as Reardon
- Klondike Annie as Officer (uncredited)
- Preview Murder Mystery as Jack Rawlins
- Wife vs. Secretary as Howard, Party Guest (uncredited)
- The Clutching Hand as Craig Kennedy
- The Country Beyond as Mountie (uncredited)
- Thirteen Hours by Air as Horace Lander, Reservations Clerk
- One Rainy Afternoon as Ice Rink Announcer (uncredited)
- Show Boat as Race Fan (uncredited)
- Undersea Kingdom (Serial) as Lieutenant Andrews [Chs. 1, 12]
- The Rogues Tavern as Bill
- The Last Outlaw as Card Player (uncredited)
- The Crime of Dr. Forbes as Pinkey (uncredited)
- Kelly of the Secret Service as George Lesserman
- Charlie Chan at the Race Track as Second Purser (uncredited)
- Hollywood Boulevard as Jack Mulhall, Actor at Trocadero Bar
- Straight from the Shoulder as Reporter (uncredited)
- Wives Never Know as Scout (uncredited)
- Murder with Pictures as Girard Henchman (uncredited)
- The Big Broadcast of 1937 as Clerk
- Wedding Present as Reporter (uncredited)
- Libeled Lady as Barker (uncredited)
- Without Orders as Jake, the Airport Guard (uncredited)
- Under Your Spell as Court Clerk (uncredited)
- Beloved Enemy as Casey

1937

- Secret Valley as Lawyer James Parker
- Love Is News as Yacht Salesman (uncredited)
- History Is Made at Night as Waiter (uncredited)
- Internes Can't Take Money as First Mug (uncredited)
- Wings Over Honolulu as Officer (uncredited)
- Armored Car as Manny (uncredited)
- Dangerous Holiday as Police Sergeant
- Born Reckless as Kane's Co-Driver (uncredited)
- Topper as Irate Nightclub Patron (uncredited)
- The Toast of New York as Broker (uncredited)
- One Hundred Men and a Girl as Rudolph
- The Boss Didn't Say Good Morning (Short) as John Jones (uncredited)
- Framing Youth (Short) as Radio Announcer
- Sky Racket as Henchman Meggs
- Radio Patrol (Serial) as Desk Sergeant
- Music for Madame as Wedding Guest (uncredited)
- Saturday's Heroes as Hotel Desk Clerk (uncredited)
- Amateur Crook as Jan Jaffin
- Tim Tyler's Luck (Serial) as Sergeant Gates

1938

- The Spy Ring as Captain Tex Randolph
- Of Human Hearts as Soldier Holding Pilgrim the Horse (uncredited)
- Mad About Music as Reporter (uncredited)
- Flash Gordon's Trip to Mars (Serial) as Bomber Captain [Chs. 4-5, 13]
- Outlaws of Sonora as Dr. George Martin
- You and Me as First Floorwalker (uncredited)
- Held for Ransom as Morrison
- Crime Ring as Detective Brady (uncredited)
- The Chaser as Joe, Brandon Henchman
- The Gladiator as Spectator at Wrestling Match (uncredited)
- Swing That Cheer as Manager (uncredited)
- Young Dr. Kildare as Intern (uncredited)
- The Storm as Harry Blake, Wireless Operator
- Sharpshooters as Photographer (uncredited)
- While New York Sleeps as Reporter (uncredited)

1939

- Dodge City (uncredited)
- Scouts to the Rescue (Serial) as Scoutmaster Hale [Ch. 1]
- Home on the Prairie as Dr. Sommers
- Made for Each Other as Rock Springs Radio Operator (uncredited)
- Three Smart Girls Grow Up as Butler (uncredited)
- Buck Rogers (Serial) as Captain Rankin
- Outlaws' Paradise as Prison Warden
- It's a Wonderful World as Reporter with Vivian (uncredited)
- 6000 Enemies as Prisoner O'Toole (uncredited)
- First Love as Terry
- Joe and Ethel Turp Call on the President as Policeman (uncredited)
- Judge Hardy and Son as Interne (uncredited)

1940

- That Inferior Feeling (Short) as Bank Teller (uncredited)
- Broadway Melody of 1940 as George (uncredited)
- The Heckler (Short) (voice, uncredited)
- Black Friday as Bartender
- Strange Cargo as Dunning (uncredited)
- Grandpa Goes to Town (uncredited)
- A Failure at Fifty (Short) as Partner (uncredited)
- I Love You Again as Worker saying 'Seventy Hours . . .' (uncredited)
- Comin' Round the Mountain as Salesman (uncredited)
- The Golden Fleecing as Reporter (uncredited)
- Strike Up the Band as Man Phoning in Contest Winner (uncredited)
- Dulcy as Businessman in Meeting (uncredited)
- A Little Bit of Heaven as Policeman (uncredited)
- Third Finger, Left Hand as Niagara Falls Guide (uncredited)
- The Quarterback as Doctor (uncredited)
- The Son of Monte Cristo as Schmidt
- Mysterious Doctor Satan (Serial) as Police Chief Rand [Chs. 1, 4, 13]

1941

- Cheers for Miss Bishop as Professor Carter
- Caught in the Act (uncredited)
- Buck Privates as Medical Examiner (uncredited)
- Back Street as Mr. White (uncredited)
- Ride, Kelly, Ride as Jockey Agent (uncredited)
- Las Vegas Nights (Serial) as Croupier (uncredited)
- Adventures of Captain Marvel as James Howell [Ch. 1]
- Federal Fugitives
- Invisible Ghost as Tim
- The Spider Returns (Serial) as Detective Farrell [Chs. 13, 14, 15] (uncredited)
- Love Crazy as Court Clerk (uncredited)
- In the Navy as Lieutenant Scott (uncredited)
- Desperate Cargo as Jim Halsey
- Bowery Blitzkrieg as Officer Sherrill
- Saddle Mountain Roundup as Freeman
- Dangerous Lady as Jones, the Hotel Clerk
- Unexpected Uncle as Policeman at Kathleen's Apartment (uncredited)
- It Started with Eve as Nightclub Photographer (uncredited)
- Sea Raiders (Serial) as 'Dolphin' Radioman [Chs. 1-2] (uncredited)
- International Lady as Desk Clerk
- Hard Guy as Tex Cassidy
- Appointment for Love as Reporter (uncredited)
- I Killed That Man as Collins
- Harvard, Here I Come! as Reporter (uncredited)
- Dick Tracy vs. Crime Inc. (Serial) as Jim Wilson

1942

- Freckles Comes Home (scenes deleted)
- Treat 'Em Rough as Waiter
- Man from Headquarters as Whalen, Reporter
- Mr. Wise Guy as Jim Barnes
- The Dawn Express as Chief Agent James Curtis
- Gang Busters (Serial) as Richards, Police Lab Technician [Chs. 9, 11] (uncredited)
- A Gentleman After Dark as Desk clerk
- So's Your Aunt Emma as Burns
- Top Sergeant as Captain Ordering Bridge Blown Up (uncredited)
- Wake Island as Dr. Parkman (uncredited)
- Between Us Girls as Nightclub Waiter (uncredited)
- The Glass Key as Lynch (uncredited)
- Sin Town as Hanson
- Foreign Agent as Steve, Editor
- The Forest Rangers as Lookout (uncredited)
- 'Neath Brooklyn Bridge as Sergeant
- Queen of Broadway as Bookie

1943

- Silent Witness as Police Officer Jed Kelly
- Kid Dynamite as Clancy, Second Abductor
- The Amazing Mrs. Holliday as Reporter (uncredited)
- The Ape Man as Reporter
- Idaho as Board Member (uncredited)
- I Escaped from the Gestapo as Police Dispatcher (uncredited)
- Cowboy in Manhattan as Headwaiter
- Colt Comrades as Postmaster (uncredited)
- Hers to Hold as Officer (uncredited)
- The Falcon in Danger as Casino Manager (uncredited)
- Ghosts on the Loose as Lieutenant
- Swing Shift Maisie as Doctor (uncredited)
- The Kansan as Walter (uncredited)
- Corvette K-225 as Officer (uncredited)
- Hi'ya, Sailor as Police Lieutenant
- Whistling in Brooklyn as Reporter (uncredited)
- Wedtime Stories

1944

- Lady in the Dark as Photographer (uncredited)
- Gambler's Choice as Harry (uncredited)
- South of Dixie as Newspaper Photographer
- Babes on Swing Street as Cop (uncredited)
- National Barn Dance as Radio Man (uncredited)
- A Wave, a WAC and a Marine as Bartender
- An American Romance as Customer (uncredited)
- My Buddy as Announcer at Convicts' Show (uncredited)
- Bowery Champs as Sergeant Ryan (uncredited)

1945

- The Man Who Walked Alone as Policeman #1
- Dillinger as Police Officer (uncredited)
- The Phantom of 42nd Street as Lieutenant Walsh
- Flame of Barbary Coast as Gambler (uncredited)

1946

- The Searching Wind as Reporter (uncredited)
- Deadline for Murder as 2nd Player (uncredited)
- Monsieur Beaucaire as Guard (uncredited)
- 'Neath Canadian Skies (Short) as Inspector
- North of the Border (Short) as Inspector Swanson

1948

- Lulu Belle as Policeman (uncredited)

1949

- You're My Everything as Suitor in 'Flaming Flappers' (uncredited)
- Sky Liner as Colonel Hanson
- My Friend Irma as Photographer (uncredited)

1952

- Chained for Life as Dr. Thompson
- Blackhawk (Serial) as Defense Council Member [Chs. 7-8] (uncredited)
- Just for You as Major (uncredited)
- Ellis in Freedomland as Male Model

1955

- Tennessee's Partner as Townsman (uncredited)
- The Man with the Golden Arm as Turnkey (uncredited)

1956

- The She Creature as Lombardi's Lawyer
- Calling Homicide as Deputy Pierson (uncredited)
- Around the World in 80 Days as Minor Role (uncredited)
- Alfred Hitchcock Presents (Season 1 Episode 30: "Never Again") as Bar Patron

1957

- Up in Smoke as Police Clerk

1958

- In the Money (scenes deleted)
- I Married a Woman as Old Cop (uncredited)
- Alfred Hitchcock Presents (Season 4 Episode 2: "Don't Interrupt") as Conductor

1959

- The Atomic Submarine as Justin Murdock (final film role)
