= Absent (1928 film) =

1928 film

- Directed by: Harry A. Gant
- Starring: Clarence Brooks; George Reed; Virgil Owens
- Cinematography: Harry A. Gant
- Production company: Rosebud Film Corp.
- Release date: August 28, 1928 (Los Angeles)
- Running time: 5 reels
- Country: United States
- Language: Silent (English intertitles)

Absent is a 1928 American silent drama film starring Clarence Brooks. It was directed by Harry Gant. The film is about a veteran with memory loss who finds employment at a mining camp, aids his hosts, and finds new purpose. It was produced by Rosebud Film Corporation. It was followed on by Brooks in Georgia Rose.

== Cast ==
- Clarence Brooks as Soldier
- George Reed as Miner
- Virgil Owens as Villain
- Rosa Lee Lincoln
- Floyd Shackeford

== Reception ==
A write-up published in the Pittsburgh Courier gave the film a rave review after a preview showing. Henry Jones wrote that Brooks "covered himself with glory" with what Jones described as his best performance up to that time.

== Preservation ==
With no prints of Absent located in any film archives, it is a lost film.
