= Harry A. Gant =

American filmmaker (1881–1967)

- Born: February 11, 1881; United States
- Died: July 26, 1967 (aged 86); United States
- Occupation(s): Film director, cinematographer

Harry Arthur Gant (February 11, 1881 - July 26, 1967) was a cinematographer and film director whose work includes African American films. He directed for the Lincoln Motion Picture Company. He was the only white person at the film company.

Gant joined the Lincoln Motion Picture Company after meeting Noble Johnson on a Universal Pictures set. Gant worked at the film company while also continuing to work for a major studio. He was also a stockholder in the fledgling film company. UCLA has a photograph of Gant and Johnson.

== Filmography ==
- Behind the Lines (1916), cinematographer
- The Secret of the Swamp (1916), cinematographer
- The Realization of a Negro's Ambition (1916), director
- The Trooper of Troop K (1916), director
- A Man's Duty (1919), director
- By Right of Birth (1921), director
