= Fighting Back (1917 film) =

1917 film

- Directed by: Raymond Wells
- Written by: Alan James; Harold Shumate
- Starring: William Desmond; Claire McDowell; Jack Richardson
- Cinematography: Pliny Horne
- Production company: Triangle Film Corporation
- Distributed by: Triangle Distributing
- Release date: November 4, 1917
- Running time: 50 minutes
- Country: United States
- Languages: Silent; English intertitles

Fighting Back is a 1917 American silent Western film directed by Raymond Wells and starring William Desmond, Claire McDowell and Jack Richardson.

== Cast ==
- William Desmond as The Weakling
- Claire McDowell as The Fury
- Jack Richardson as China-Mex
- Curley Baldwin as Alama Sam
- Pete Morrison as Mournful Pete
- William Ellingford as James Newton
- Tom Guise as Col. Hampton
- Thornton Edwards as Tony
- Josie Sedgwick as Dance-Hall Girl

== Preservation ==
With no holdings located in archives, Fighting Back is considered a lost film.

== Bibliography ==
- Rainey, Buck. Sweethearts of the Sage: Biographies and Filmographies of 258 actresses appearing in Western movies. McFarland & Company, 1992.
