= The Saintly Sinner =

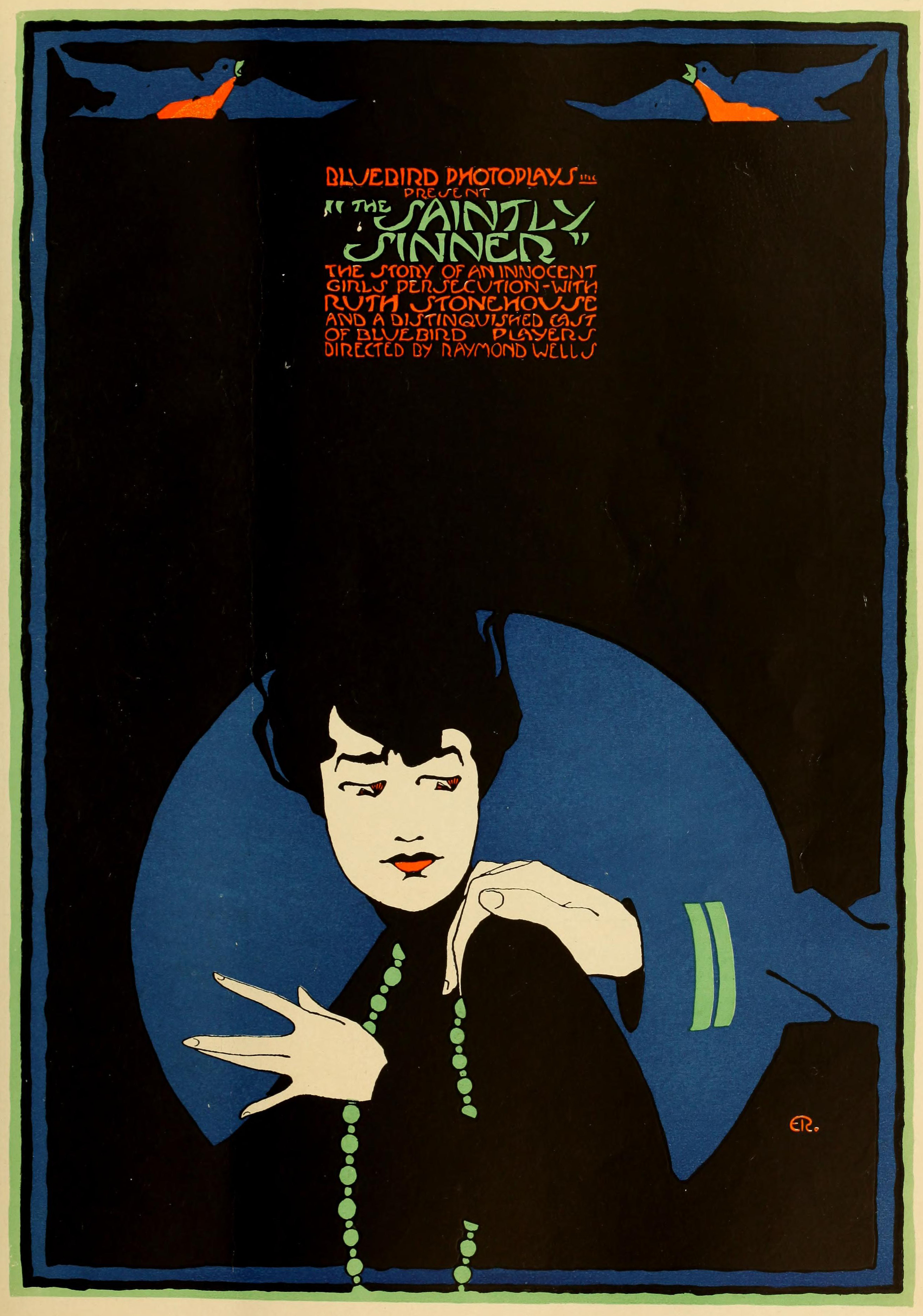
- Directed by: Raymond Wells
- Written by: L.H. Hutton; Eugene B. Lewis
- Starring: Ruth Stonehouse; Jack Mulhall; Alida Hayman
- Cinematography: R.E. Irish
- Production company: Universal Pictures
- Distributed by: Universal Pictures
- Release date: February 26, 1917
- Running time: 50 minutes
- Country: United States
- Languages: Silent; English intertitles

The Saintly Sinner is a 1917 American silent crime drama film directed by Raymond Wells and starring Ruth Stonehouse, Jack Mulhall and Alida Hayman.

== Cast ==
- Ruth Stonehouse as Jane Lee
- Jack Mulhall as George Barnes
- Alida Hayman as Bess Murphy
- Dorothy Drake as Mrs. Carrington
- Henry Devries as John Brock
- Raymond Whitaker as Richard White
- Fred Montague as Governor Barnes
- T.D. Crittenden as Jane's Father

== Bibliography ==
- Robert B. Connelly. The Silents: Silent Feature Films, 1910-36, Volume 40, Issue 2. December Press, 1998.
