= The Fugitive (1910 film) =

1910 film directed by D. W. Griffith

- PLAY film; runtime 00:16:58
- Directed by: D. W. Griffith
- Written by: John MacDonagh
- Starring: Kate Bruce; Edward Dillon
- Cinematography: G. W. Bitzer
- Production company: Biograph Company
- Distributed by: Biograph Company
- Release date: November 7, 1910
- Running time: 17 minutes
- Country: United States
- Language: Silent (English intertitles)

The Fugitive is a 1910 American drama film directed by D. W. Griffith and produced and distributed by the Biograph Company. Prints of the film survive at the Library of Congress, the George Eastman Museum and Film Preservation Associates. The script was by John MacDonagh, who would later fight in the Easter Rising under the command of his brother, Thomas MacDonagh, one of the signatories of the Proclamation of the Irish Republic.

== Plot ==
Two soldiers, both named John, each bid farewell to his mother and fiancée to go fight in the war, one as a Confederate private and the other as a Union corporal. Corporal John leads a small foraging party, but is ambushed by a larger group of Confederates, including the other John. When the Union troops retreat, Corporal John becomes separated from the others. The two Johns encounter each other in the woods. Both fire their weapons, and the Confederate is killed. The Union soldier flees as the rest of the Confederates arrive.

By chance, the Union soldier seeks refuge in the home of his fallen enemy's family. He begs the mother for help. She orders him to leave at first, but when the Confederate soldiers come near, she hides him. The Confederates enter the house and, after looking around, deposit the body of her dead son. After they leave, she realizes who killed him. She tells the Union soldier to go, but when the Confederates return, she thinks of his mother and hides him again. The Union soldier is able to rejoin his side.

After the war ends, he returns to his family. The Confederate son's former fiancée introduces her new beau to the Confederate mother.

== Cast ==
- Kate Bruce as Confederate mother
- Edward Dillon as John, Confederate son
- Clara T. Bracy as Union mother
- Edwin August as John, Union son
- Dorothy West as Confederate son's fiancée
- Lucy Cotton as Union son's fiancée
- Jack Mulhall as New boyfriend

== See also ==
- List of American films of 1910
- D. W. Griffith filmography
