= Mr. Dolan of New York =

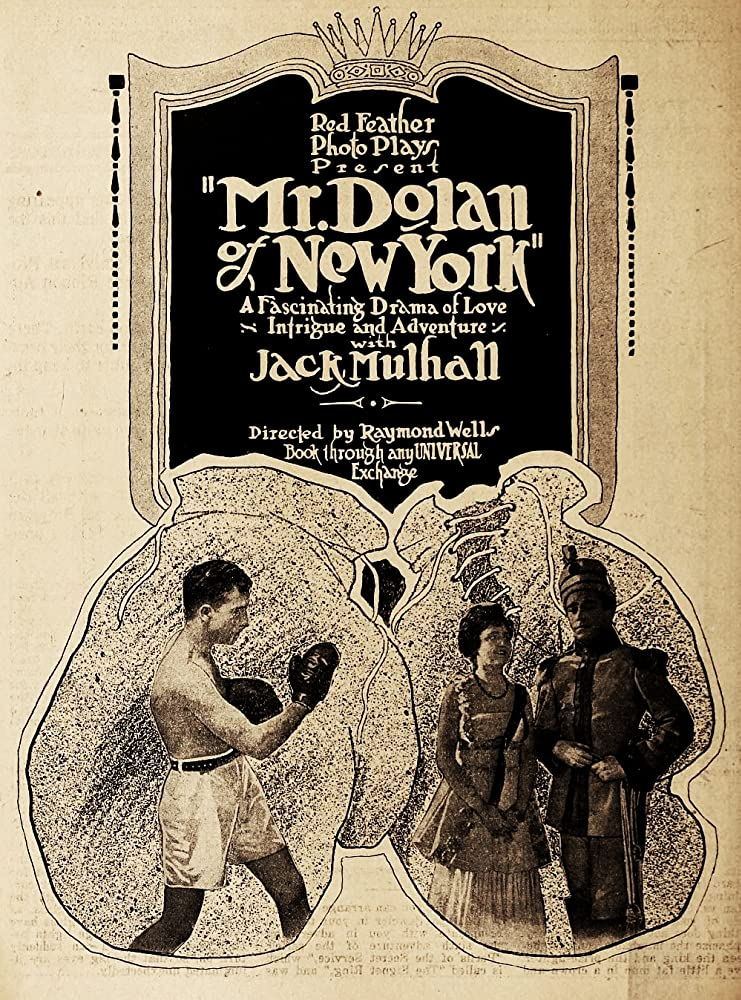
- Directed by: Raymond Wells
- Written by: Fred Myton; Raymond Wells
- Starring: Jack Mulhall; Noble Johnson; Julia Ray
- Cinematography: George W. Scott
- Production company: Red Feather Photoplays
- Distributed by: Universal Film Manufacturing Company
- Release date: April 9, 1917
- Running time: 50 minutes
- Country: United States
- Language: Silent (English intertitles)

Mr. Dolan of New York is a 1917 American silent drama film directed by Raymond Wells and starring Jack Mulhall, Noble Johnson and Julia Ray. It was shot at Universal City.

== Cast ==
- Jack Mulhall as Jimmy Dolan
- Noble Johnson as Thomas Jefferson Jones
- Julia Ray as Alicia
- Albert MacQuarrie as Count Conrad
- Harry Mann as The King
- Ernest Shields as Prince Frederick
- Francis McDonald as 'Spider' Flynn
- Grace McLean as Mlle. D'Orsay

== Bibliography ==
- Robert B. Connelly. The Silents: Silent Feature Films, 1910-36, Volume 40, Issue 2. December Press, 1998.
