= Natural law (disambiguation) =

Natural law is law that exists independently of the positive law of a given political order, society or nation-state.

Natural law may also refer to:

- "Natural Law" (Star Trek: Voyager), a Star Trek: Voyager episode
- Natural-law argument, an argument for the existence of God
- Natural Law Party, a trans-national union of political parties, with national branches in over 80 countries
  - Natural Law Party of Canada
  - Natural Law Party (Ireland)
  - Natural Law Party of Israel
  - Natural Law Party of New Zealand
  - Natural Law Party of Ontario
  - Natural Law Party of Quebec
  - Natural Law Party (Trinidad and Tobago)
  - Natural Law Party (United States)
- Scientific law, statements based on experimental observations that describe some aspect of the world

== See also ==
- Law of nature (disambiguation)
- Crime against nature (disambiguation)
- The Law of Nature (disambiguation)
