= Fighting for Love (1917 film) =

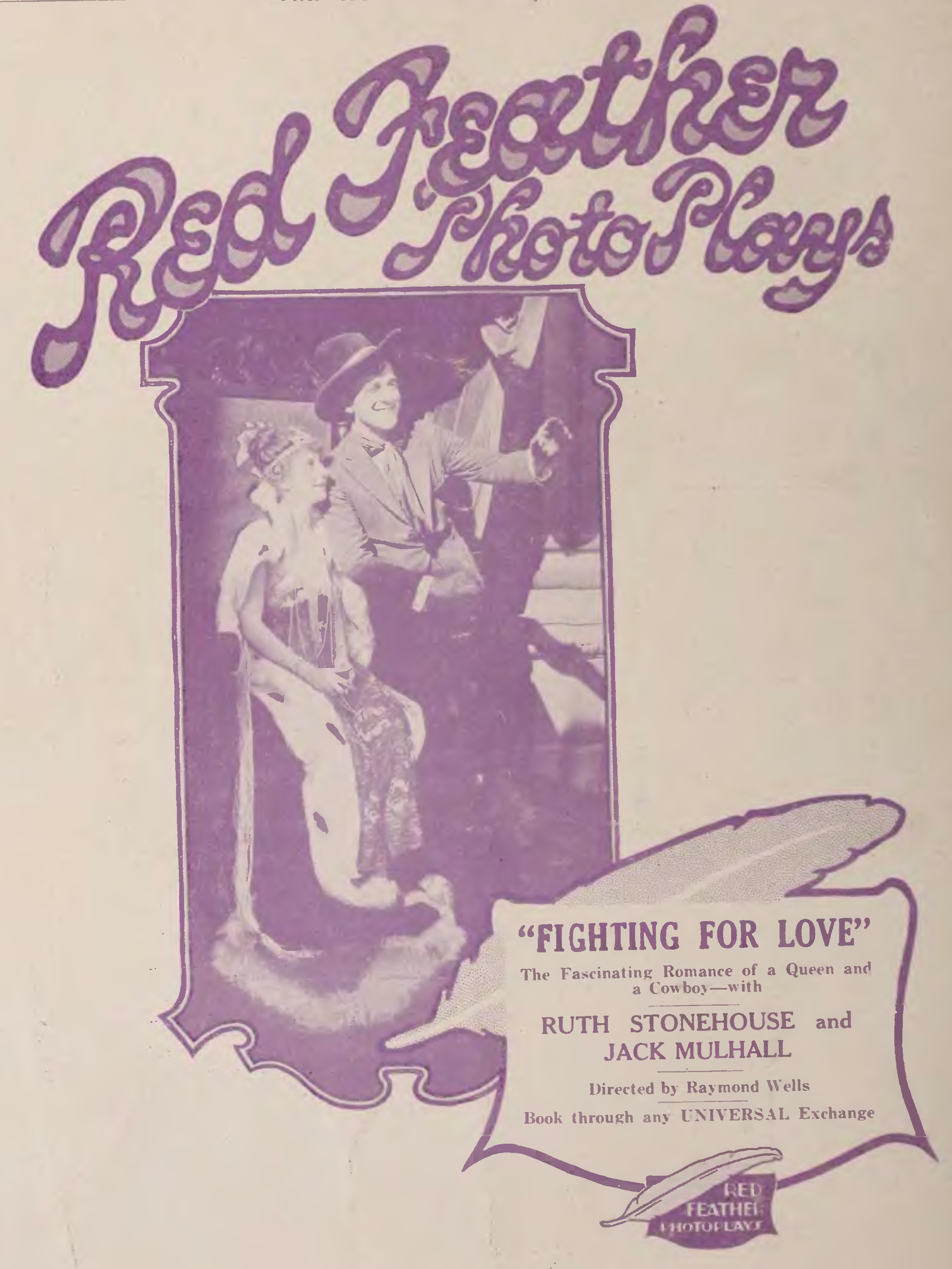
- Directed by: Raymond Wells
- Written by: Fred Myton; Raymond Wells
- Starring: Ruth Stonehouse; Jack Mulhall; Jean Hersholt
- Production company: Red Feather Photoplays
- Distributed by: Universal Pictures
- Release date: January 8, 1917
- Running time: 50 minutes
- Country: United States
- Languages: Silent; English intertitles

Fighting for Love is a 1917 American silent comedy drama film directed by Raymond Wells and starring Ruth Stonehouse, Jack Mulhall and Jean Hersholt. It was shot at Universal City.

== Plot ==
In adjoining kingdoms rule Sylvia, beloved of her people, and Ferdinand, who is forced to exact homage from his subjects. He spends his life in riotous living. One day the two meet, and straightway Ferdinand decides that he will marry the queen, sending his prime minister with the proposal. But she refuses it. He delivers the ultimatum that unless she consents to his proposal within a certain space of time, he will declare war.

In America, two cowboys, Jim and Johnny Little Bear, discover a rich mine and decide to spend some money traveling. The two start out. It happens that during their travels they stop near the kingdom of Sylvia, and Jim, wishing to see a real queen, makes bold to climb the wall. He sees a beautiful lady, who is none other than Sylvia herself, but he thinks her one of the court ladies. She finally confides the predicament of the queen, and he tells her that he will come to the assistance of the great lady. He wires to Bill, one of the cowboys, and tells him to come on with the whole gang. When he rides to the palace to tell the lady, he finds that she is the queen. Meantime, Ferdinand's favorite, seeing that her reign is coming to an end, tries to hold him, but he refuses to have more to do with her. Both sides prepare for battle. Ferdinand, with his army, attacks Sylvia's force before the cowboys arrive, and they are being forced to retreat when Bill arrives and saves the day. The favorite is killed when she tries to slay Sylvia.

Jim explains to the boys that he is in love with Sylvia, and they finally persuade him to ask her hand in marriage. But Sylvia kindly explains that though she loves him, the dictates of custom compel her to marry royalty. Bill and the boys, seeing that Jim is taking this keenly, leave him in the palace and after a time return, telling him that they have captured the whole of Sylvia's forces, and that now he is the king. Sylvia is informed of this and with queenly dignity places her crown upon Jim's head, and so accepts his proposal of marriage.

== Cast ==
- Ruth Stonehouse as Sylvia
- Jack Mulhall as Jim
- Jean Hersholt as Ferdinand
- Noble Johnson as Johnny Little Bear
- J.F. Briscoe as Bill Guard
- Ruby Marshall as King's Favorite

== Bibliography ==
- Robert B. Connelly. The Silents: Silent Feature Films, 1910-36, Volume 40, Issue 2. December Press, 1998.
