= Raymond Wells =

American actor

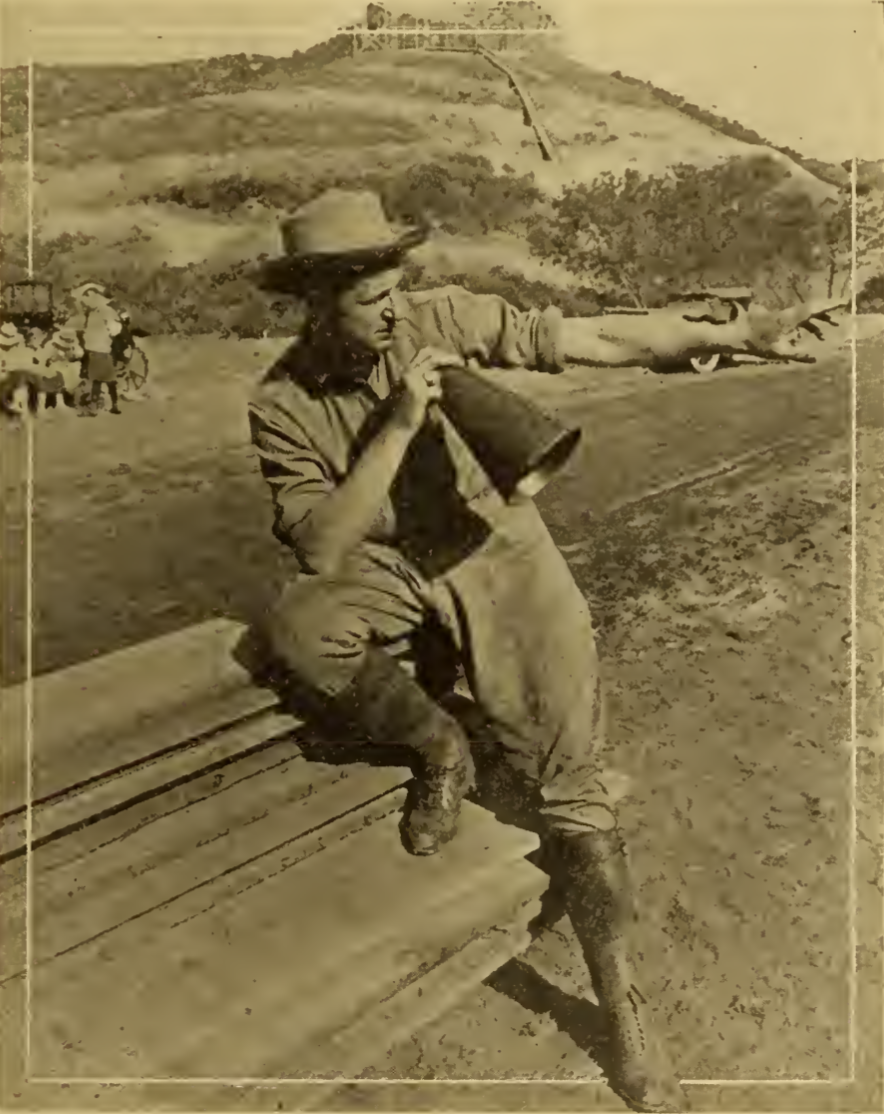
- Wells in 1916
- Born: October 14, 1880; Anna, Illinois, United States
- Died: August 9, 1941 (aged 60); Los Angeles, California, United States
- Occupations: Actor, Writer, Director
- Years active: 1915–1933 (film)

Raymond Wells (1880–1941) was an American actor, screenwriter, and film director of the silent era. He is sometimes credited as Raymond B. Wells.

== Partial filmography ==
- Old Heidelberg (1915) (actor)
- The Sable Lorcha (1915) (actor)
- Kinkaid, Gambler (1916)
- Sunshine Dad (1916)
- The Hero of the Hour (1917)
- Love Aflame (1917)
- Fighting Back (1917)
- Fanatics (1917)
- The Saintly Sinner (1917)
- The Terror (1917)
- Fighting for Love (1917)
- Mr. Dolan of New York (1917)
- The Hand at the Window (1918)
- The Yankee Señor (1926) (actor)
- The Unknown Cavalier (1926)
- The Thrill Seekers (1927)
- Trails of Adventure (1933)
- Contraband (1933)

== Bibliography ==
- Goble, Alan. The Complete Index to Literary Sources in Film. Walter de Gruyter, 1999.
