= The Terror (1917 film) =

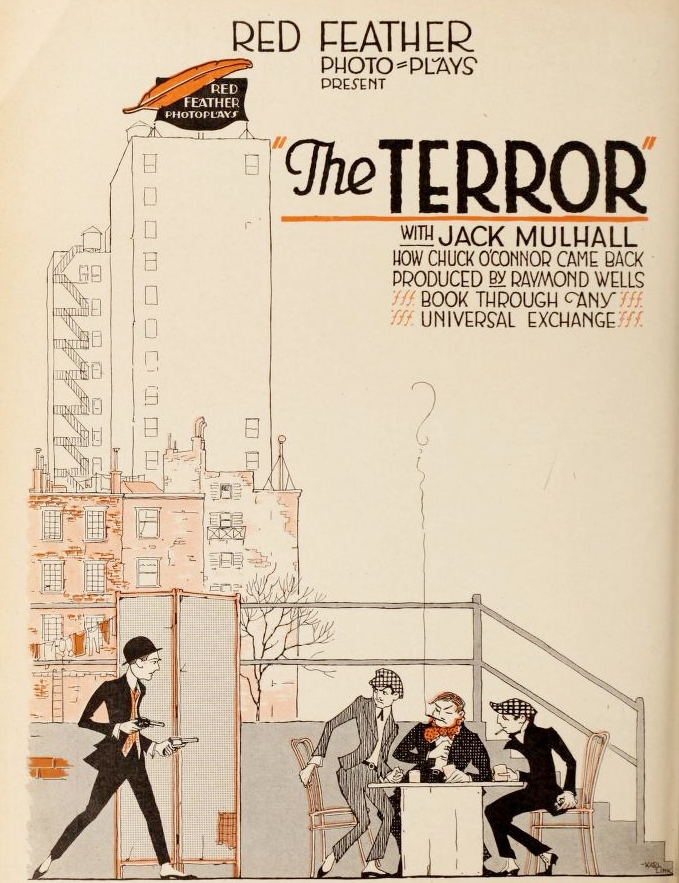
- Directed by: Raymond Wells
- Written by: Fred Myton; Raymond Wells
- Starring: Jack Mulhall; Grace MacLaren; Virginia Lee
- Cinematography: R.E. Irish
- Production company: Universal Pictures
- Distributed by: Universal Pictures
- Release date: February 12, 1917
- Running time: 50 minutes
- Country: United States
- Languages: Silent; English intertitles

The Terror is a lost 1917 American silent crime drama film directed by Raymond Wells and starring Jack Mulhall, Grace MacLaren and Virginia Lee.

== Cast ==
- Jack Mulhall as Chuck Connelly
- Grace MacLaren as Maggie Connelly
- Virginia Lee as Annie Mangan
- Malcolm Blevins as Jim Canford
- Hugh Hoffman as Jerome Travers
- Noble Johnson as Mike Tregurtha
- Jean Hersholt as Jimm, the Dope
- Evelyn Selbie as Mrs. Connelly

== Preservation ==
With no holdings located in archives, The Terror is considered a lost film.

== Bibliography ==
- Robert B. Connelly. The Silents: Silent Feature Films, 1910-36, Volume 40, Issue 2. December Press, 1998.
