= The Hero of the Hour =

1917 film

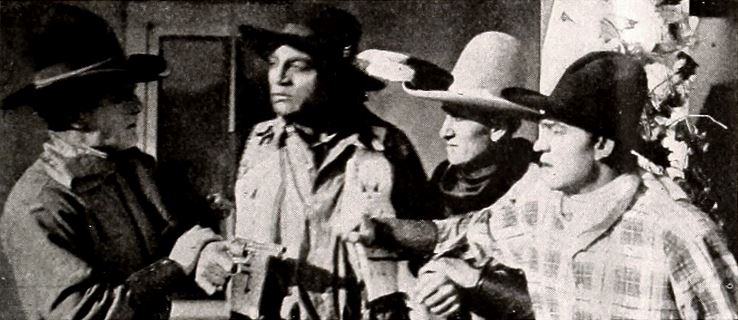
- Film still
- Directed by: Raymond Wells
- Written by: Eugene B. Lewis
- Story by: Raymond Wells
- Starring: Jack Mulhall; Wadsworth Harris; Fritzi Ridgeway
- Distributed by: Universal Film Manufacturing Company
- Release date: April 23, 1917
- Country: United States
- Languages: Silent; English intertitles

The Hero of the Hour is a 1917 American silent Western film directed by Raymond Wells. It stars Jack Mulhall, Wadsworth Harris, and Fritzi Ridgeway.

== Cast ==
- Jack Mulhall as Billy Brooks
- Wadsworth Harris as Brooks Sr.
- Fritzi Ridgeway as Mildred
- Eugene Owen as Nebeker
- Fred Burns as Foreman
- Millard K. Wilson as The Mexican
- Grace McLean as Juanita
- Noble Johnson as the Native American
