= Beulah Hall Jones =

African American actress

- Born: July 28, 1902; San Antonio, Texas, U.S.
- Died: October 8, 1952 (aged 50); Los Angeles, California, U.S.
- Other name: Beulah Hall Wyndon
- Occupation: Actress
- Spouse: Emmit E. Wyndon (m. 1929–1952)

Beulah Hall Jones (also credited as Beulah Hall) was an African American actress known for such films as The Realization of a Negro's Ambition, The Trooper of Troop K, Cameo Kirby, director John Ford's The Prisoner of Shark Island and her final film role as Daisy in Drums Along the Mohawk, also directed by John Ford.

Jones was also known for her work with the Lincoln Motion Picture Company, one of the first African American run and owned film production companies.

In 2022, associate professor Cara Caddoo from The Media School and the College of Arts and Sciences' Department of History at Indiana University Bloomington, while researching her newest book, found lost footage of Jones from an early 1917 film she had acted in, The Trooper of Troop K, spliced into another Lincoln Motion Picture Company film, By Right of Birth, released in 1921.

Jones was married to Emmit E. Wyndon.

Jones died October 8, 1952 at age 50 in Los Angeles, California.
