= Love Aflame =

1917 American film

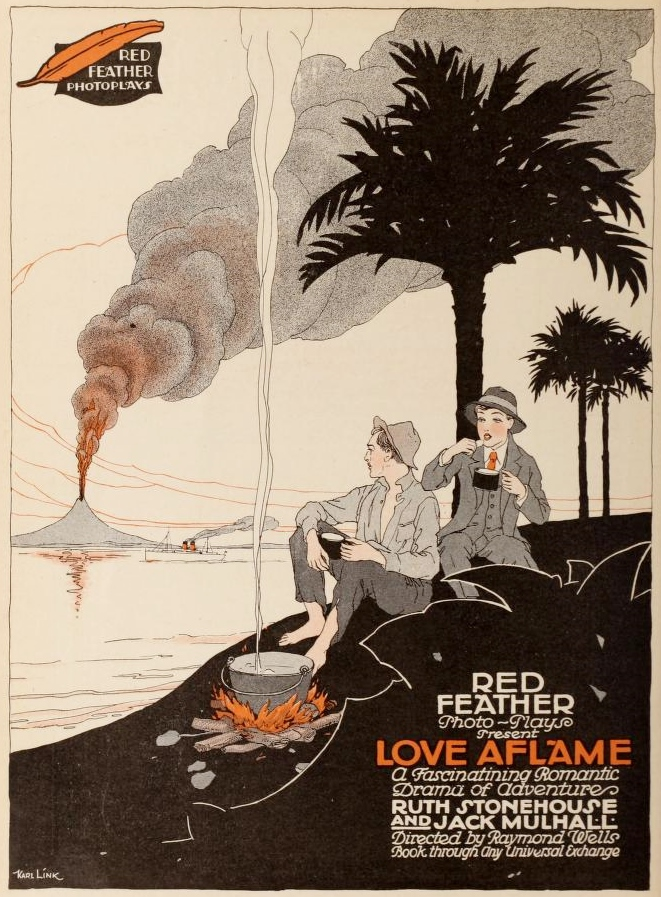
- Directed by: James Vincent; Raymond Wells
- Written by: James R. Garey; Mary Murillo; Fred Myton; Raymond Wells
- Starring: Ruth Stonehouse; Stuart Holmes; Jack Mulhall
- Cinematography: René Guissart
- Edited by: Alfred DeGaetano
- Production company: Universal Pictures
- Distributed by: Universal Pictures
- Release date: January 29, 1917
- Running time: 50 minutes
- Country: United States
- Languages: Silent; English intertitles

Love Aflame is a 1917 American silent comedy drama film directed by James Vincent and Raymond Wells and starring Ruth Stonehouse and Stuart Holmes and Jack Mulhall. Prints and/or fragments were found in the Dawson Film Find in 1978.

== Cast ==
- Ruth Stonehouse as Betty Mason
- Stuart Holmes as George Howard
- Jack Mulhall as Jack Calvert
- Jean Hersholt as Reginald
- Kenneth Hunter as Robert Sterling
- Madeleine Le Nard as Rita Lawson
- Raymond Whitaker as Mr. Mason
- Noble Johnson as Cannibal King
- Jane Lee as Willie Sterling
- Fronzie Gunn as His Favorite
- Katherine Lee as Myrtle Sterling
- Nita White as Martha

== Bibliography ==
- Robert B. Connelly. The Silents: Silent Feature Films, 1910-36, Volume 40, Issue 2. December Press, 1998.
