= The Law of Nature (1917 film) =

1917 film by Noble Johnson

The Law of Nature is a 1917 American film produced by Noble Johnson of Lincoln Motion Picture Company and featuring an African American cast.

The plot features a woman leaving her rancher husband and children to revisit the glamorous East where she used to live. After being humiliated, alone, and ill, she realizes "her folly and the inevitable consequences of her violation of “Nature’s Law”." She returns west and rejoins her family.

It was advertised with "The World's Greatest Negro Star in "The Law of Nature" a tremendously powerful story with a wholesome moral" for a one night showing at the Alhambra Theatre in Omaha, Nebraska. It played Chicago's Washington Theater where it was praised by owner Chester Paul.

Noble Johnson was born in Missouri and grew up in Colorado Springs and traveled with his father, racehorse owner and trainer Perry J. Johnson. Noble Johnson met ranchers and worked in stables, ranches, and for mining companies, experiences that helped develop him into the stuntman and filmmaker he became.

== Cast ==
- Noble M. Johnson
- Albertine Pickens
- Clarence A. Brooks
- Estelle Everett
- Stebeno Clements
- Frank White
- Elsworth Saunders
- Sallie Richardson
