= Crimes Against Nature (2004 book) =

2004 non-fiction book by Robert F. Kennedy Jr.

- Author: Robert F. Kennedy Jr.
- Subject: Environmentalism
- Genre: Non-fiction
- Publication date: 3 August 2004
- Pages: 256
- ISBN: 978-0-06-074687-2

Crimes Against Nature: How George W. Bush and His Corporate Pals Are Plundering the Country and Hijacking Our Democracy is a 2004 book by Robert F. Kennedy Jr. about George W. Bush.

== Publication ==
Crimes Against Nature was written by Waterkeeper Alliance founder Robert F. Kennedy Jr. and published by HarperCollins.

== Synopsis ==
In the book, Kennedy is fiercely critical of George W. Bush, accusing him of undermining democracy and damaging the environment. The book's criticism includes the lobbying efforts of American oil company Halliburton, and Bush's appointment of Gale Norton to the role of Interior Secretary.

The book focuses on the fossil fuel industry, the American beef industry and lumber industry, documenting carbon dioxide output and poisoning from mercury and arsenic.

== Critical reception ==
Publishers Weekly noted that Kennedy is critical of Bush and others for using fear to drive the change they want, but that Kennedy himself also uses fear in the book to drive the change he seeks. The review praises Kennedy for making a passionate case.

== See also ==
- Presidency of George W. Bush
- Environmental impact of the petroleum industry
- Irony
