= George Perry Johnson =

American film producer, writer and newsreel producer

George Perry Johnson (October 29, 1885 - October 17, 1977) was a film producer, writer, and newsreel producer in the United States. He produced Lincoln Motion Picture Company films with his brother Noble Johnson and later produced newsreels for African American audiences.

He graduated from the Hampton Institute in Virginia in 1904. He moved to Tulsa, Oklahoma and established The Tulsa Guide newspaper in 1906. In 1913 he moved to Omaha, Nebraska and worked at the U.S. Post Office. He later settled in Los Angeles and worked as a writer, producer, and distributor for the Lincoln Motion Picture Company during its existence from 1916 until 1923 while also working for the post office. After the film company closed he established the Pacific Coast News Bureau in 1923. It lasted until 1927.

== Filmography ==
- By Right of Birth (1921), story author
