= Lincoln Motion Picture Company =

Defunct African American film production company

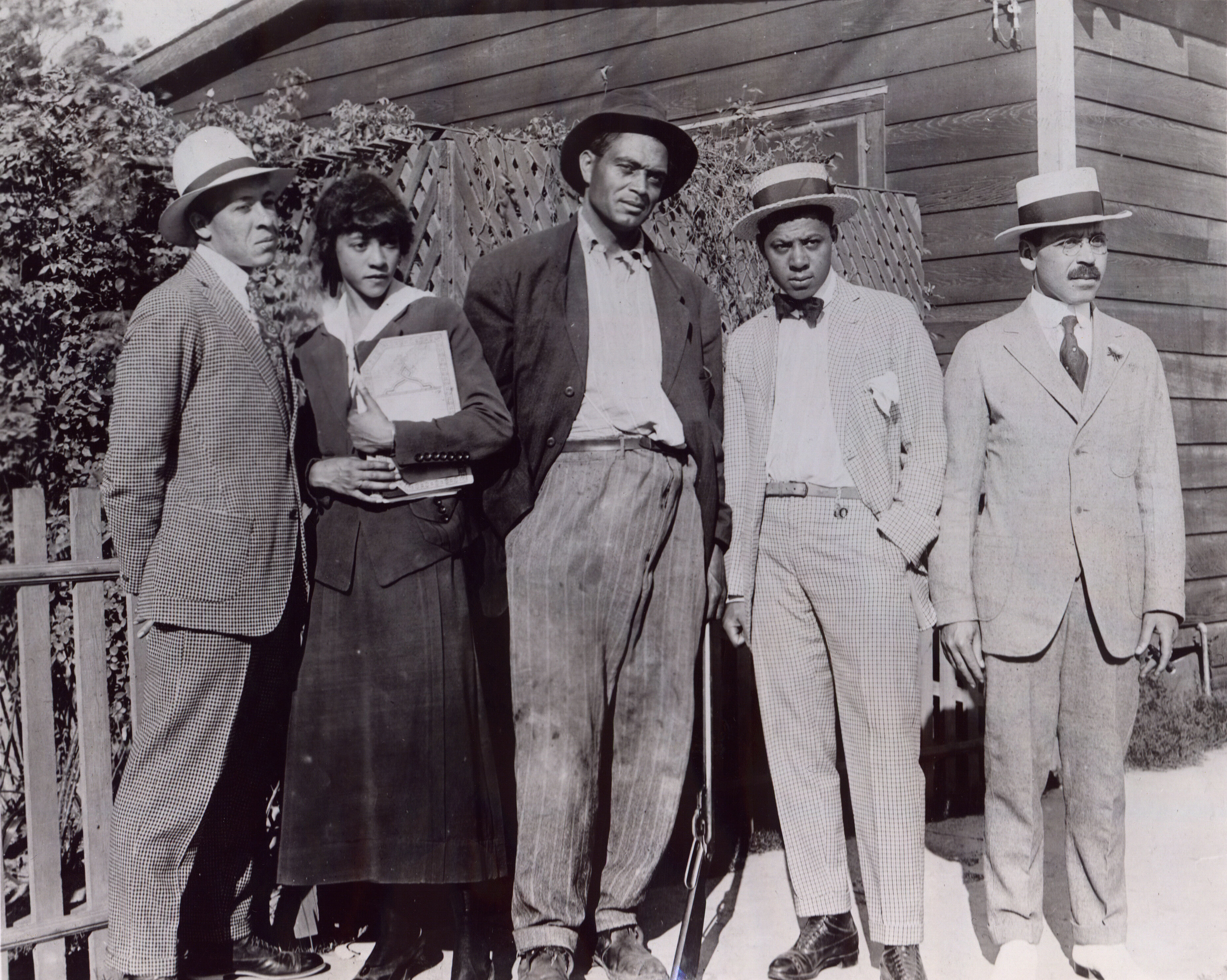
- Lincoln Motion Picture Company staff, c. 1921. From left Clarence A. Brooks (secretary), actress Beulah Hall Jones, Noble Johnson (president), Dudley Brooks (assistant secretary) and Dr. James Smith (treasurer)
- Company type: Production company
- Industry: Film
- Founded: 1916 in Omaha, Nebraska
- Founder: Noble Johnson; George Perry Johnson
- Defunct: 1921
- Headquarters: United States

The Lincoln Motion Picture Company was an American film production company founded in 1916 by Noble Johnson and George Perry Johnson. Noble Johnson was president of the company, and the secretary was actor Clarence A. Brooks. Dr. James T. Smith was treasurer, and Dudley A. Brooks was the assistant secretary. The company is known as the first producer of race movies. Established in Omaha, Nebraska, the company relocated to Los Angeles the following year. It remained in operation until 1921, closing shortly after announcing a final project, The Heart of a Negro. The point of the creation of Lincoln's was to eliminate the stereotypical roles of "slapstick comedy" in Hollywood at the time for Black actors and actresses. The "best advertised and most widely known Race Corporation in the world" is the famous slogan for the company.

== Background ==
In the first two decades of the 20th century, African American audiences were ignored by film studios. Because African American audiences were ignored, there was a high demand for films geared to catering to black audiences. Thus bringing about the need for black motion picture production companies.

The Lincoln Motion Picture Company is considered the first all-Black movie production company, building a reputation for making films that showcased African American talent in the film industry. The company made and distributed only five films. The first film that was created and produced by the Lincoln Motion Picture Company was The Realization of a Negro's Ambition (1916). This was the first film that would portray and show the Black middle class. These films were limited to African American audiences in churches, schools, and "Colored Only" theaters, despite the Johnson brothers wanting a wider audience. Unfortunately, production expenses and low sales halted future films to be made and distributed. Noble left his position as president to become an actor at Universal Pictures, with Dr. James T. Smith taking over the position. Speculation tells that the films that starred Johnson were released by the company at this time were commercially more successful than the white owned Universal Studios. The Lincoln Motion Picture Company lasted until 1921.

Although the Lincoln Motion Picture Company did not last long, it was influential in the African American community. This company inspired the movement of more ethnic movie companies.

== Founding and mission ==
Scholars note that the company’s founders, Noble Johnson and George Perry Johnson, intentionally sought to challenge racist depictions of African Americans by producing films that emphasized ambition, respectability, and social mobility.

Early Lincoln films were part of an emerging movement of race cinema that circulated within segregated venues and community institutions, providing Black audiences with rare access to onscreen portrayals that reflected their own aspirations.

== Production operations ==
After relocating to Los Angeles, the company continued producing films that highlighted Black professionals, families, and soldiers—images that countered the limited roles available to African American performers in mainstream productions.

However, the company faced structural challenges, including restricted distribution networks and difficulty securing financing. These factors were part of broader inequalities affecting early Black filmmakers in the silent film era.

== Unreleased projects ==
The Lincoln Motion Picture Company had future plans to release a film titled The Heart of a Negro. The film never saw the light of day due to the company's closure.

== Closure ==
The company closed after briefly relocating to Los Angeles, canceling the film due to the studio's general failure to operate. The Lincoln Motion Picture group faced many problems over the course of its five-year run; some notable issues include a lack of funding, the complete absence of a multi-ethnic audience, production expense, minimal sales, and segregation making it almost impossible to show the film in a general theater as the film was panned in "Whites Only" screenings if not outright banned entirely.

== Films and themes ==
The themes found in Lincoln’s filmography reflected the company’s commitment to depicting African American life with depth and dignity. Scholars describe these films as early examples of narrative cinema shaped by African American creative control, offering alternatives to dominant representations found in white-owned studios.

Film historian Jacqueline Stewart argues that the company’s storytelling strategies anticipated later cultural movements by foregrounding Black modernity and mobility.

== Filmography ==
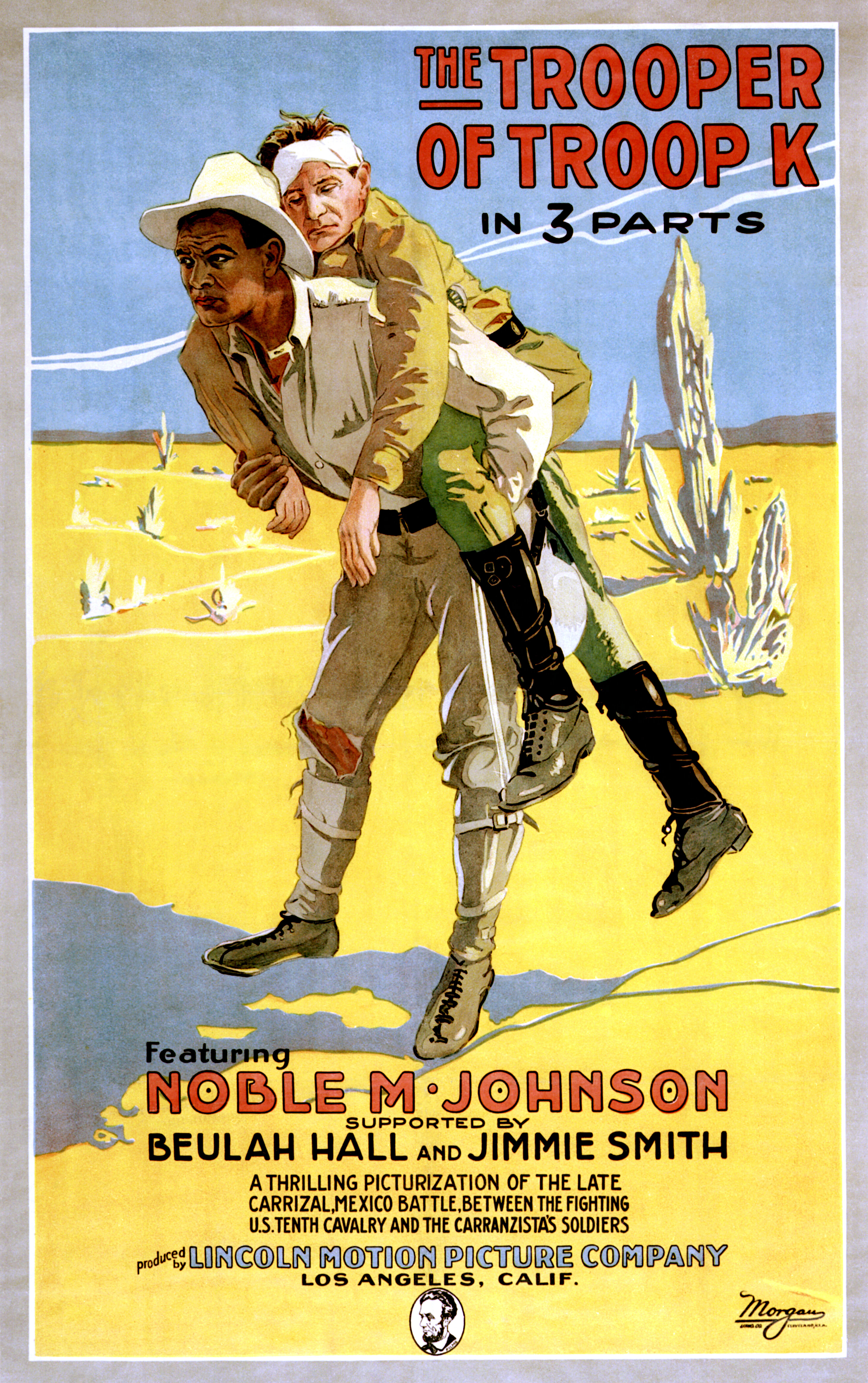
Movie poster of The Trooper of Troop K

- The Realization of a Negro's Ambition (1916)
- The Law of Nature (1916)
- The Trooper of Company K (1917)
- A Man's Duty (1919)
- By Right of Birth (1921)

== Legacy and cultural impact ==
Although short-lived, the Lincoln Motion Picture Company is recognized for its significant contribution to early African American cinema. Scholars credit the company with pioneering new cinematic possibilities by centering Black perspectives, middle-class identities, and community values at a moment when Black representation in film was severely restricted.

The studio’s influence can be traced in later African American filmmaking traditions and in the expanded opportunities created by independent Black filmmakers in the decades that followed.

== See also ==
- African Americans in Omaha, Nebraska
- Oscar Micheaux
