= The Realization of a Negro's Ambition =

1916 film

- Directed by: Harry A. Gant
- Starring: Noble Johnson; Bessie Baker; Lottie Boles; Beulah Hall Jones; Clarence Brooks; A. Burns; Gertrude Christmas
- Production company: Lincoln Motion Picture Company
- Release date: 1916
- Country: United States
- Language: English

The Realization of a Negro's Ambition is a 1916 American silent short film that is now lost. The film was directed by Harry A. Gant for the Los Angeles–based "Negro Firm" Lincoln Motion Picture Company; this two-reel film was the production company's first production and it boasted an "all star Negro cast".

== Premise ==
An African-American man leaves his home to find success in the oil business. When he rescues the daughter of a wealthy oilman, he is given the opportunity to be the head of an expedition. He later becomes wealthy and returns home, where he marries his high school sweetheart.

== See also ==
- List of lost films
