= Noble Johnson =

American actor (1881–1978)

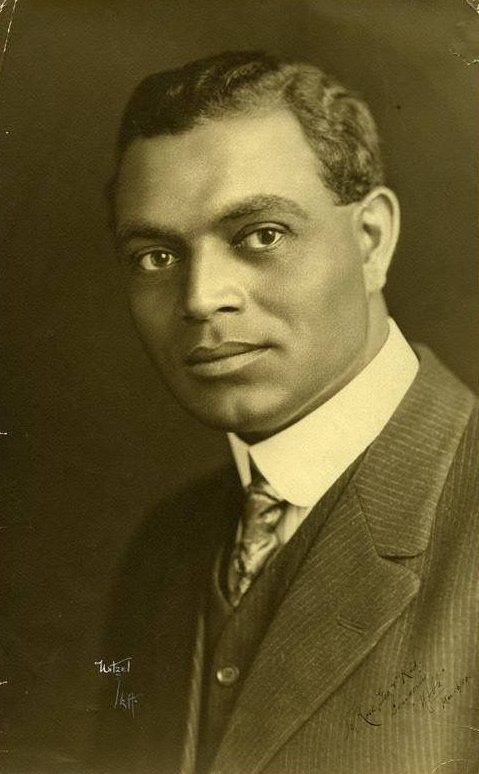
- Johnson in 1915
- Born: April 18, 1881; Marshall, Missouri, U.S.
- Died: January 9, 1978 (aged 96); Yucaipa, California, U.S.
- Resting place: Eternal Valley Memorial Park, Newhall, California
- Other name: Mark Noble
- Years active: 1915–1950
- Spouse(s): Ruth Thornton (m. 1912; div. 19??); Gladys Blackwell
- Relatives: George Perry Johnson (brother)

Noble Johnson (April 18, 1881 – January 9, 1978), later known as Mark Noble, was an American actor and film producer. He appeared in films such as The Mummy (1932), The Most Dangerous Game (1932), King Kong (1933) and Son of Kong (1933). He founded Lincoln Motion Picture Company.

== Biography ==
Johnson was born in 1881 in Marshall, Missouri. He was of African-American ancestry. Shortly after his birth, the family moved to Colorado Springs, Colorado. At age fifteen, Johnson left school to help his father, a horse trader, with work. In 1909, Johnson entered the film industry. Standing 6'2" and weighing 215 pounds, Johnson had an impressive physique that made him in demand as a character actor and bit player. In the silent era, he assumed a wide variety of characters of different races due to his lighter complexion. While Johnson was cast as black characters in many films, he also played Native American, Arab, and Asian parts.

Noble was good friends with fellow actor Lon Chaney, his schoolmate in Colorado. He was also an entrepreneur, founding his own studio, Lincoln Motion Picture Company, in 1916 in Omaha, Nebraska, with his younger brother George Perry Johnson. The Lincoln Motion Picture Company was an African-American film company (apart from director Harry A. Gant) that produced what were called "race films", movies made for the African-American audience, which was largely ignored by the "mainstream" film industry, and was the first to produce movies portraying African-Americans as real people instead of as racist caricatures (Johnson was followed into the race film business by Oscar Micheaux and others). Johnson, who served as president of the company and was its primary asset as a star actor, helped support the studio by acting in other companies' productions such as 20,000 Leagues Under the Sea (1916), and investing his pay from those films in Lincoln. The Lincoln Motion Picture Company moved to Los Angeles in 1917.

Lincoln's first picture was The Realization of a Negro's Ambition (1916). For four years, Johnson managed to keep Lincoln a going concern, primarily through his extraordinary commitment to African-American filmmaking. However, he reluctantly resigned as president in 1920 because he could no longer continue his double business life, maintaining a demanding career in Hollywood films while trying to run a studio.

In the 1920s, Johnson was a very busy character actor, appearing in silent films such as The Four Horsemen of the Apocalypse (1921) with Rudolph Valentino, Cecil B. DeMille's original The Ten Commandments (1923), The Thief of Bagdad (1924), Dante's Inferno (1924) and When a Man Loves (1927). He made the transition to sound films, appearing in The Mysterious Dr. Fu Manchu (1929) as Li Po, in Moby Dick (1930) as Queequeg to John Barrymore's Captain Ahab, and in the Boris Karloff film The Mummy (1932) as "the Nubian". He was also the Native Chief on Skull Island in the classic King Kong (1933) (and its sequel The Son of Kong, 1933) and appeared in Frank Capra's classic Lost Horizon (1937) as one of the porters. One of his later films was John Ford's She Wore a Yellow Ribbon (1949), in which he played Native American Chief Red Shirt. He retired from the movie industry in 1950.

Johnson died of natural causes on January 9, 1978, in Yucaipa, California. He is buried in the Garden of Peace at Eternal Valley Memorial Park in Newhall, California.

== Selected filmography ==
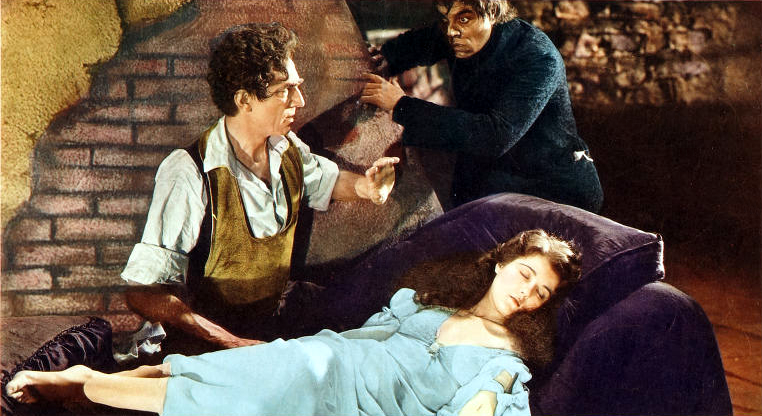
Noble Johnson with Bela Lugosi and Sidney Fox in Murders in the Rue Morgue, 1932

- Intolerance (1916) as Babylonian Soldier (uncredited)
- Kinkaid, Gambler (1916) as Romero Valdez
- 20,000 Leagues Under the Sea (1916) (uncredited)
- Fighting for Love (1917) as Johnny Little Bear
- Love Aflame (1917) as Cannibal King
- The Terror (1917) as Mike Tregurtha
- Mr. Dolan of New York (1917) as Thomas Jefferson Jones
- The Hero of the Hour (1917) as Native American
- The Red Ace (1917) as Little Bear
- Bull's Eye (1917) as Sweeney Bodin
- The Law of Nature (1917)
- The Lure of the Circus (1918) as Silent Andy
- The Midnight Man (1919) as Spike
- Lightning Bryce (1919) as Dopey Sam's Henchman (Episode #5) / Arnold's Butler (Episodes #12 & #13) (uncredited)
- Under Crimson Skies (1920) as Baltimore Bucko
- The Adorable Savage (1920) as Ratu Madri
- Sunset Sprague (1920) as The Crow
- The Leopard Woman (1920) as Chaké - Madame's Slave
- The Four Horsemen of the Apocalypse (1921) as Conquest (uncredited)
- The Wallop (1921) as Espinol
- The Bronze Bell (1921) as Chatterji
- Serenade (1921) as Capt. Ramirez
- The Adventures of Robinson Crusoe (1922) as Friday
- Tracks (1922) as Leon Serrano
- The Loaded Door (1922) as Blackie Lopez
- Captain Fly-by-Night (1922) as Indian (uncredited)
- Drums of Fate (1923) as Native King
- Haunted Valley (1923)
- Burning Words (1923) as Bad Pierre
- The Ten Commandments (1923) as The Bronze Man (Prologue)
- A Man's Mate (1924) as Lion
- The Thief of Bagdad (1924) as The Indian Prince
- The Midnight Express (1924) as Deputy Sheriff
- Little Robinson Crusoe (1924) as Marimba, Cannibal Chief
- Dante's Inferno (1924) as Devil Whipping Woman (uncredited)
- The Navigator (1924) as Cannibal Chief (uncredited)
- The Dancers (1925) as Ponfilo
- Adventure (1925) as Googomy
- Ben-Hur: A Tale of the Christ (1925) as Crowd Member (uncredited)
- The Gold Hunters (1925) as Wabigoon
- Hands Up! (1926) as Sitting Bull
- The Law of the Snow Country (1926) as Martell
- The Flaming Frontier (1926) as Chief Sitting Bull
- Aloma of the South Seas (1926)
- The Lady of the Harem (1926) as Tax Collector
- When a Man Loves (1927) as Aggressive Apache (uncredited)
- Red Clay (1927) as Chief Bear Paw
- The King of Kings (1927) as Charioteer
- Vanity (1927) as Bimbo, Ship's Cook
- Topsy and Eva (1927) as Uncle Tom
- Soft Cushions (1927) as The Captain of the Guard
- The Gateway of the Moon (1928) as Soriano
- Something Always Happens (1928) as The Thing
- Why Sailors Go Wrong (1928) as Native (uncredited)
- The Yellow Cameo (1928) as Smoke Dawson
- Manhattan Knights (1928) as Doc Mellis
- The Black Ace (1928)
- Yellow Contraband (1928) as Li Wong Foo
- Noah's Ark (1928) as Slave Broker
- Sal of Singapore (1928) as Erickson's 1st Mate
- Redskin (1929) as Pueblo Jim
- Black Waters (1929) as Jeelo
- The Four Feathers (1929) as Ahmed
- The Mysterious Dr. Fu Manchu (1929) as Li Po
- Mamba (1930) as Hassim (uncredited)
- Moby Dick (1930) as Queequeg
- Renegades (1930) as Youssef (uncredited)
- Kismet (1930) (uncredited)
- Son of India (1931) as Guard (uncredited)
- East of Borneo (1931) as Osman
- Safe in Hell (1931) as Bobo, Caribbean Policeman
- Murders in the Rue Morgue (1932) as Janos The Black One
- Mystery Ranch (1932) as Mudo, Henchman
- The Most Dangerous Game (1932) as Ivan
- The Mummy (1932) as The Nubian
- Nagana (1933) as Head Boatman
- White Woman (1933) as Native Chief (uncredited)
- King Kong (1933) as Native Chief
- Roman Scandals (1933) as Torturer (uncredited)
- Son of Kong (1933) as Native Chief (uncredited)
- Massacre (1934) as Indian Leader (uncredited)
- Murder in Trinidad (1934) as Queechie
- Kid Millions (1934) as Attendant (uncredited)
- The Lives of a Bengal Lancer (1935) as Ram Singh
- She (1935) as Amahaggar Chief (uncredited)
- Dante's Inferno (1935) as Devil (uncredited)
- Escape from Devil's Island (1935) as Bisco
- My American Wife (1936) as Native American Nation Leader (uncredited)
- Mummy's Boys (1936) as Tattoo Artist (uncredited)
- The Plainsman (1936) as Native American #1 with Painted Horse (uncredited)
- Lost Horizon (1937) as Leader of Porters on return journey (uncredited)
- Wee Willie Winkie (1937) as Sikh Policeman (uncredited)
- Conquest (1937) as Roustan (uncredited)
- Four Men and a Prayer (1938) as Native (uncredited)
- Mysterious Mr. Moto (1938) as Native Sergeant (uncredited)
- Hawk of the Wilderness (1938) as Mokuyi
- Frontier Pony Express (1939) as Luke Johnson, outlaw gang leader
- Juarez (1939) as Gen. Regules (uncredited)
- Union Pacific (1939) as Native American Shooting Piano (uncredited)
- Tropic Fury (1939) as Hannibal, Slave-Driver
- Drums Along the Mohawk (1939) as Indian (uncredited)
- Allegheny Uprising (1939) as Captured Delaware Native American (uncredited)
- Green Hell (1940) as Hostile, Tribe Chief (uncredited)
- The Ghost Breakers (1940) as The Zombie
- The Ranger and the Lady (1940) as Lobo
- North West Mounted Police (1940) as Indian (uncredited)
- Seven Sinners (1940) as Irate Russian (uncredited)
- Road to Zanzibar (1941) as Chief
- Hurry, Charlie, Hurry (1941) as Chief Poison Arrow
- Aloma of the South Seas (1941) as Moukali
- Shut My Big Mouth (1942) as Chief Standing Bull
- The Mad Doctor of Market Street (1942) as Native Chief Elan
- Jungle Book (1942) as Sikh
- Ten Gentlemen from West Point (1942) as Tecumseh
- Danger in the Pacific (1942) as Native Chief (uncredited)
- Night in New Orleans (1942) as Carney
- Thank Your Lucky Stars (1943) as Charlie the Indian (uncredited)
- The Desert Song (1943) as Abdel Rahmen (uncredited)
- A Game of Death (1945) as Carib
- Angel on My Shoulder (1946) as Trustee in Hell (uncredited)
- Plainsman and the Lady (1946) as Wassao
- Hard Boiled Mahoney (1947) as Hasson
- Slave Girl (1947) as Native Guard (uncredited)
- Along the Oregon Trail (1947) as Indian Chief (uncredited)
- Unconquered (1947) as Tall Ottawa Shot at Gilded Beaver (uncredited)
- The Gallant Legion (1948) as Chief Black Eagle (uncredited)
- Dream Girl (1948) as Bartender (uncredited)
- She Wore a Yellow Ribbon (1949) as Chief Red Shirt
- Rock Island Trail (1950) as Bent Creek
- North of the Great Divide (1950) as Nagura, Oseka Chief (final film role)
